= Brooch =

Large ornament with a pin fastening

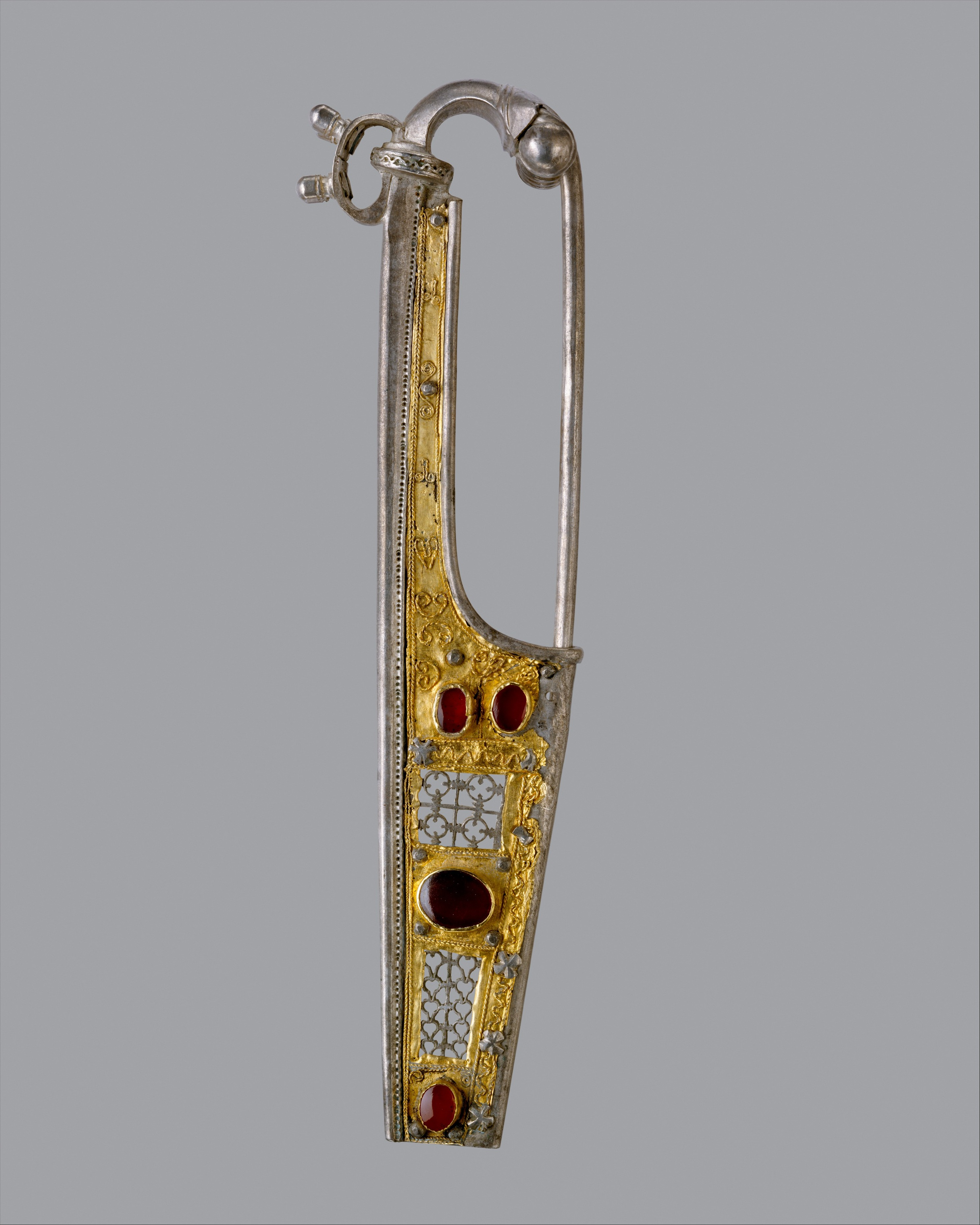
Wing Brooch, 2nd century AD, Metropolitan Museum of Art

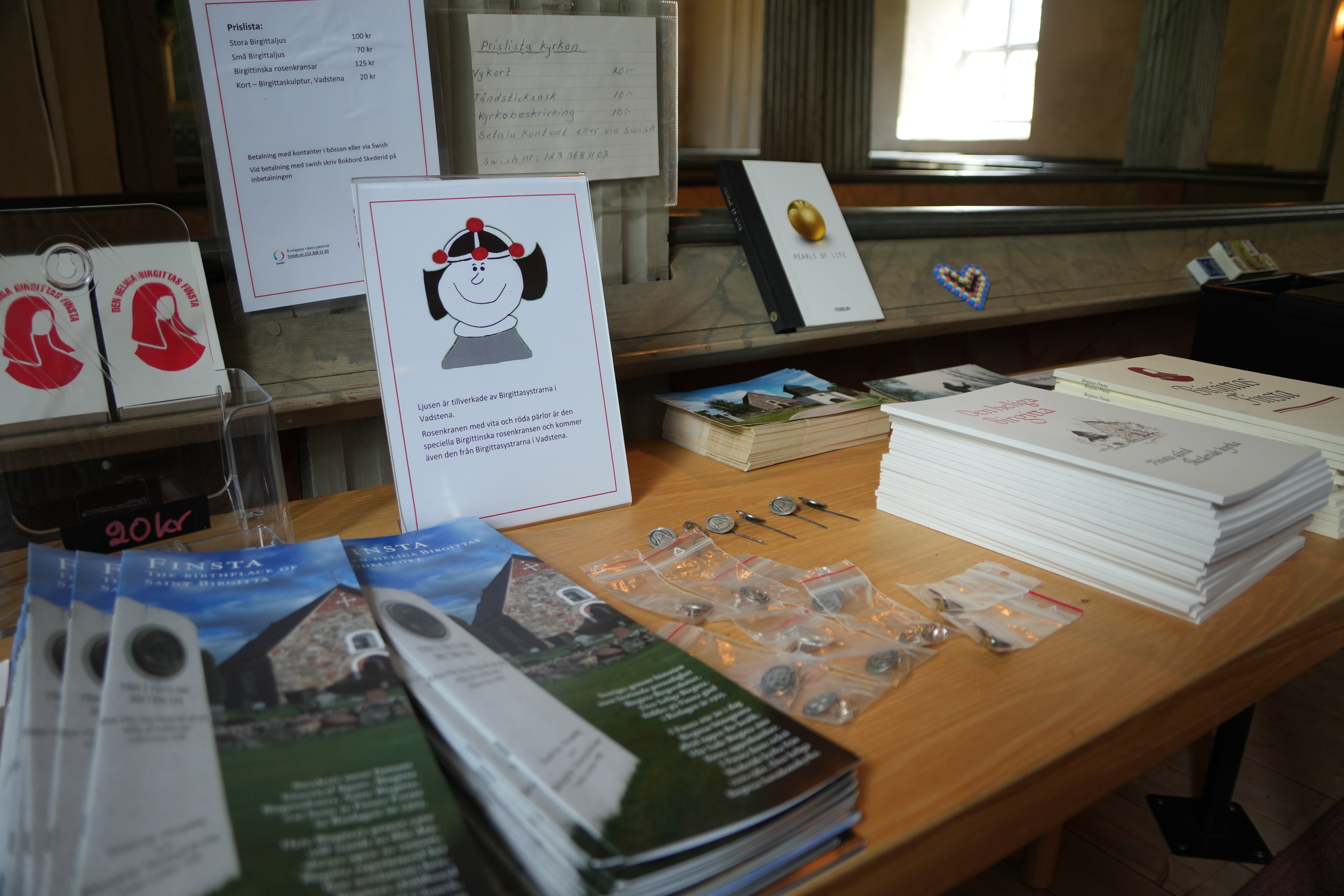
A table at Skederid Evangelical-Lutheran Church with Christian literature, as well as brooches of Saint Bridget of Sweden

A brooch (/ˈbroʊtʃ/, also US: /ˈbruːtʃ/) is a decorative jewellery item, or the insignia of a fraternal order, designed to be attached to garments, often to fasten them together. It is usually made of metal, often silver or gold or some other material. Brooches are frequently decorated with enamel or with gemstones and may be solely for ornament or serve a practical function as a clothes fastener. The earliest known brooches are from the Bronze Age. As fashions in brooches changed rather quickly, they are important chronological indicators. In archaeology, ancient European brooches are usually referred to by the Latin term fibula. One example is the Tara Brooch.

A stomacher can consist of one or more elements. If it consists of one element, it can be best described as a large and elaborate brooch to be worn at the top of the bodice, in the centre of the neckline.

In the 20th century, brooches were traditionally worn by women, while lapel pins were worn by men. At present, the use of lapel pins is not limited to men.

== Ancient brooches ==
Brooches from antiquity and before the Middle Ages are often called fibulae (singular: fibula), especially in continental European contexts. British archaeologists tend to distinguish between bowed fibulae and flatter brooches, even in antiquity. They were necessary as clothes fasteners, but also often highly decorative, and important markers of social status for both men and women, from the Bronze Age onwards. In Europe, during the Iron Age, metalworking technology had advanced dramatically. The newer techniques of casting, metal bar-twisting and wire making were the basis for many new objects, including the fibula. In Europe, Celtic craftsmen were creating fibulae decorated in red enamel and coral inlay, as early as 400 BC.

The earliest manufacture of brooches in Great Britain was during the period from 600 to 150 BC. The most common brooch forms during this period were the bow, the plate and in smaller quantities, the penannular brooch. Iron Age brooches found in Britain are typically cast in one piece, with the majority made in copper alloy or iron. Prior to the late Iron Age, gold and silver were rarely used to make jewellery.

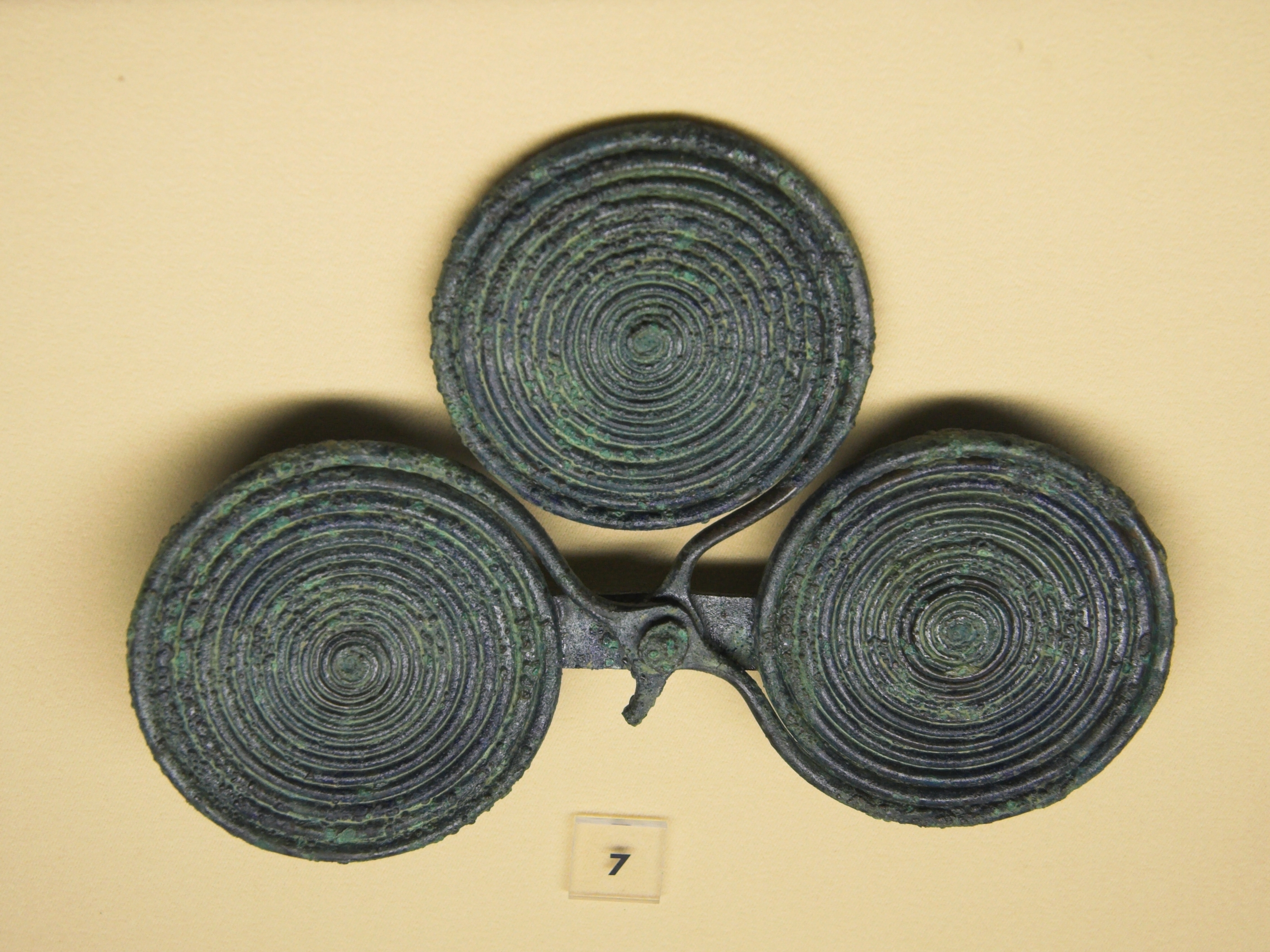
Bronze Age brooch

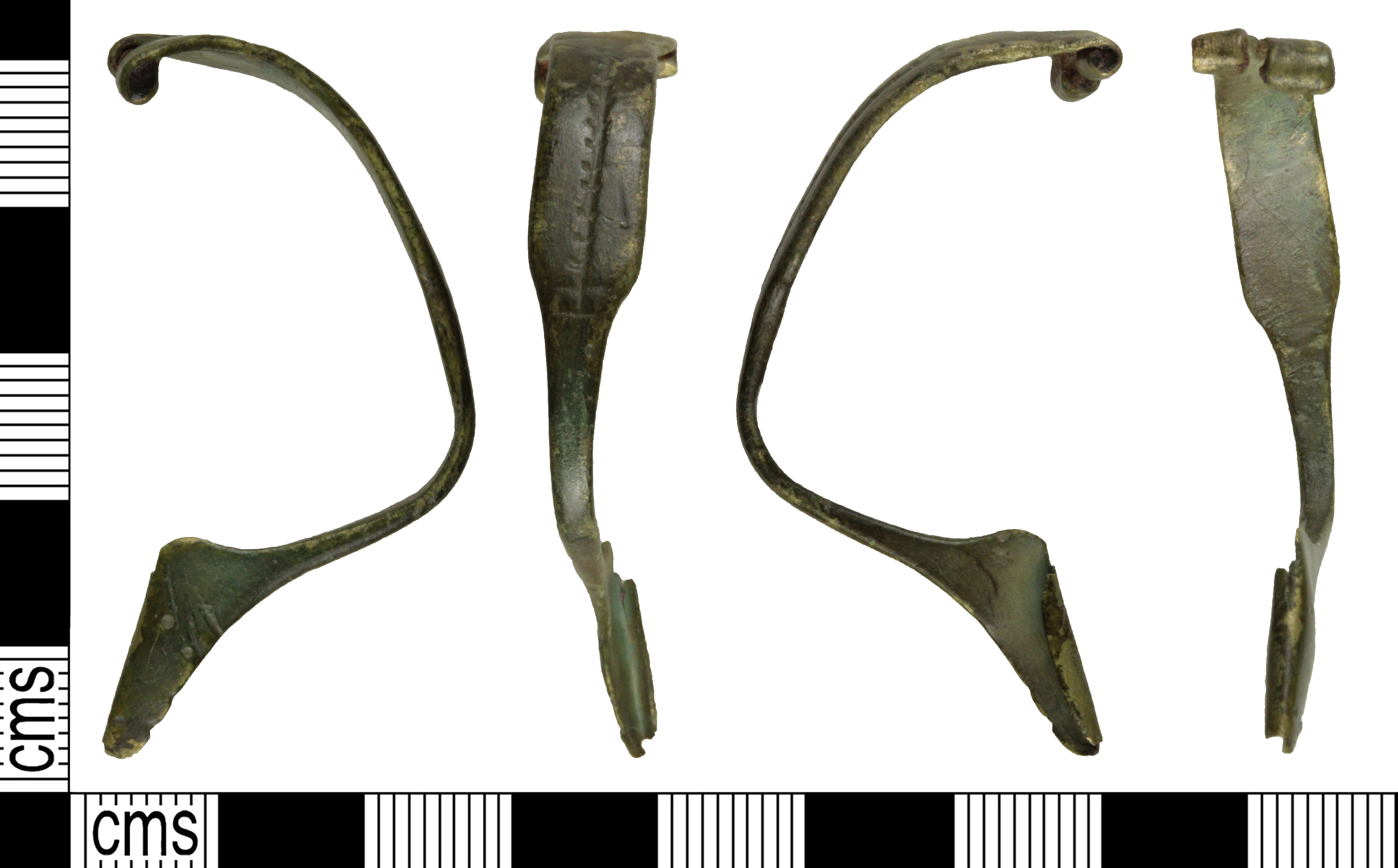
Bow brooch, Iron Age

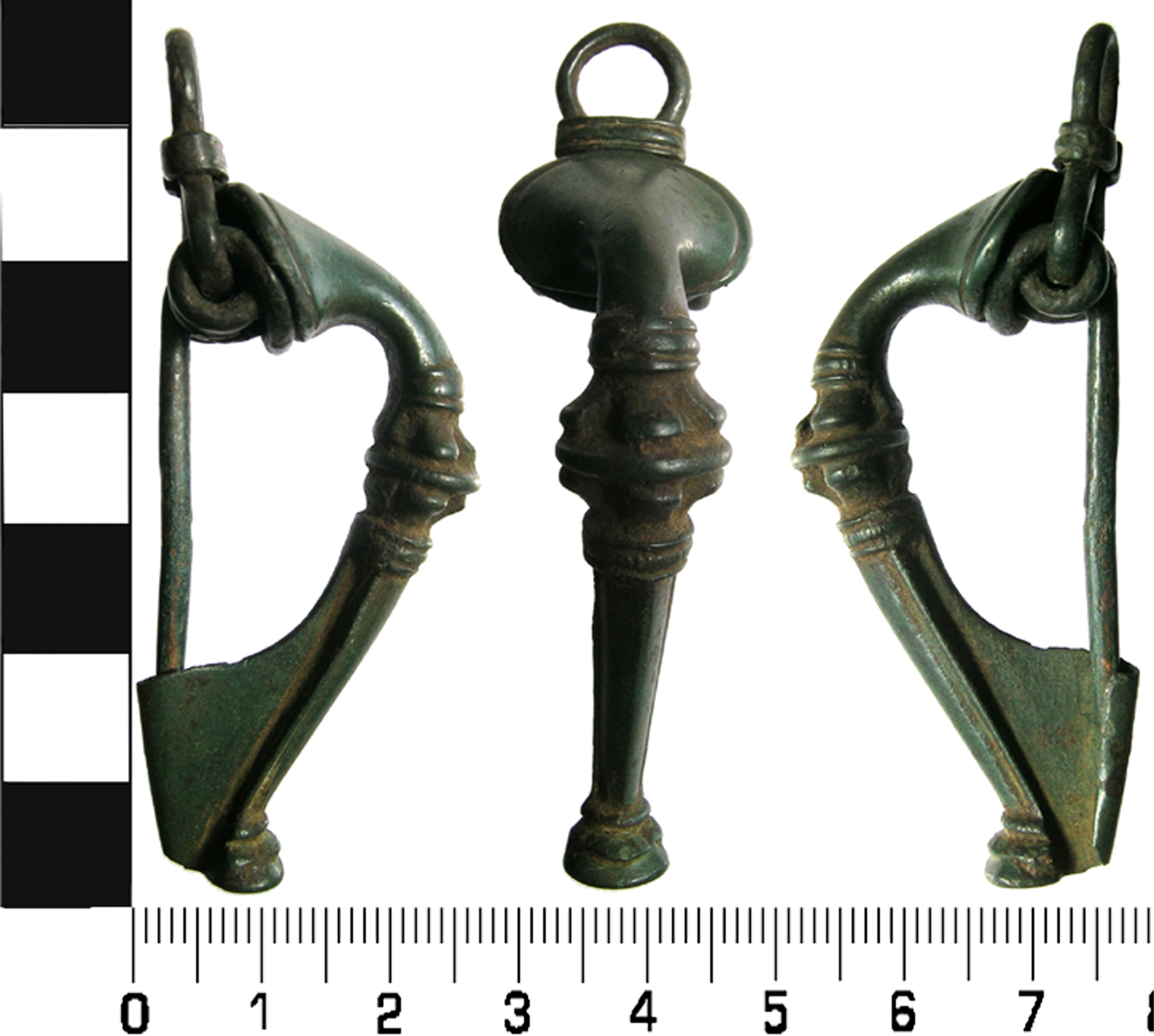
Trumpet brooch, Iron Age

== Medieval brooches ==
=== Migration period ===
The distinctive metalwork that was created by the Germanic peoples from the fourth through the eighth centuries belong to the art movement known as Migration period art. During the 5th and 6th centuries, five Germanic tribes migrated to and occupied four different areas of Europe and England after the collapse of the Roman Empire. The tribes were the Visigoths who settled in Spain, the Ostrogoths in Eastern Germany and Austria, the Franks in West Germany, the Lombards in Northern Italy and the Anglo-Saxons in England. Because the tribes were closely linked by their origins, and their jewellery techniques were strikingly similar, the work of these people was first referred to as Barbarian art. This art style is now called Migration period art.

Brooches dating from this period were developed from a combination of Late Roman and new Germanic art forms, designs and technology. Metalworkers throughout western Europe created some of the most colourful, lively and technically superior jewellery ever seen. The brooches of this era display techniques from Roman art: repoussé, filigree, granulation, enamelling, openwork and inlay, but it is inlay that the Migration period artists are famous for. Their passion for colour makes their jewellery stand out. Colour is the primary feature of Migration period jewellery. The precious stone most often used in brooches was the almandine, a burgundy variety of garnet, found in Europe and India. According to J. Anderson Black, "designers would cover the entire surface of an object with the tiny geometric shapes of precious stones or enamel which were then polished flat until they were flush with the cloisonné settings, giving the appearance of a tiny stained glass window."

Brooch designs were many and varied: geometric decoration, intricate patterns, abstract designs from nature, bird motifs and running scrolls. Zoomorphic ornamentation was a common element during this period, in Anglo-Saxon England as well as in Europe. Intertwined beasts were a signature feature of these lively, intricately decorated brooches. Bow shaped, S-shaped, radiate-headed and decorated disc brooches were the most common brooch styles during the Migration Period, which spanned the 5th through the 7th centuries.

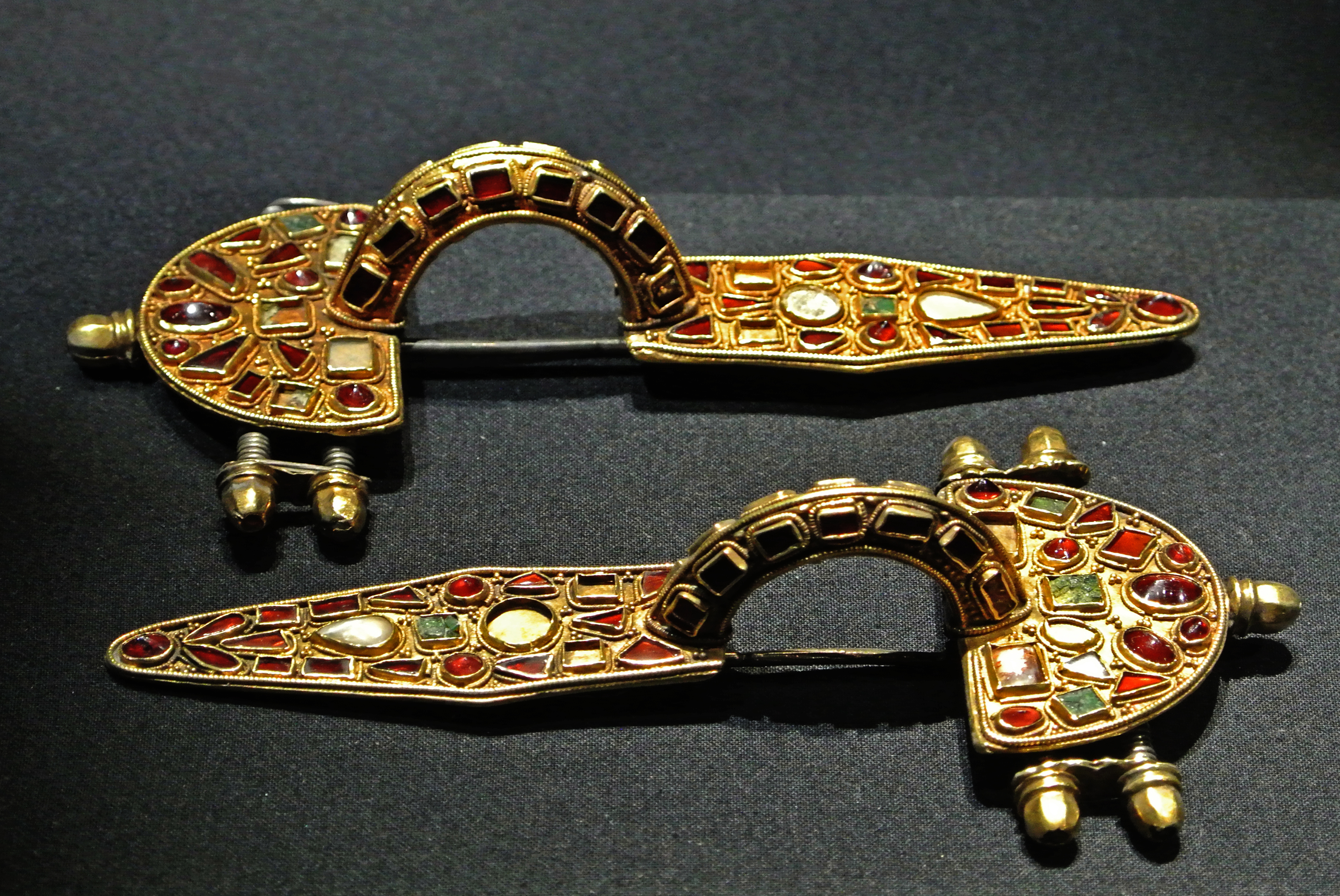
East Germanic bow brooches

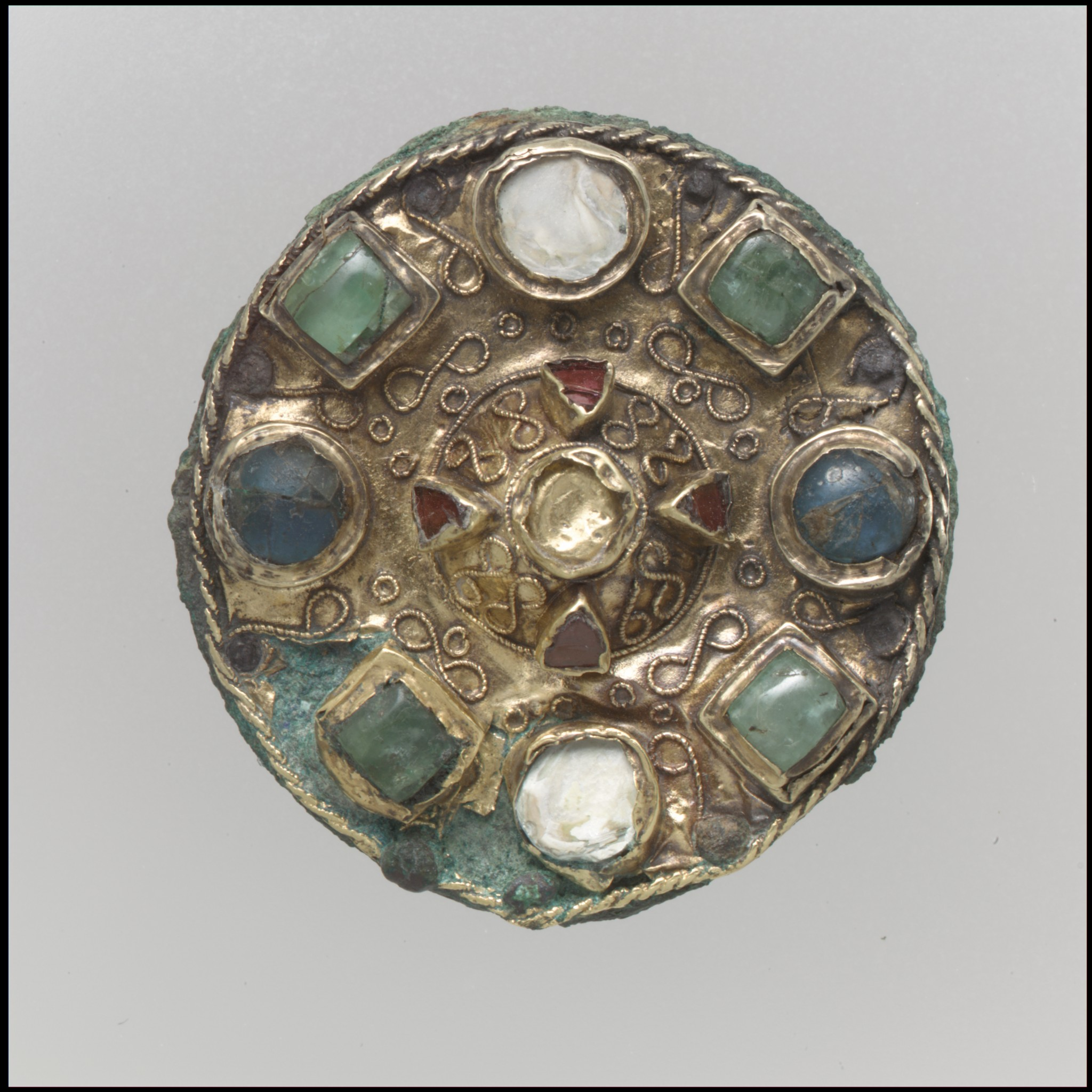
Frankish disc brooch

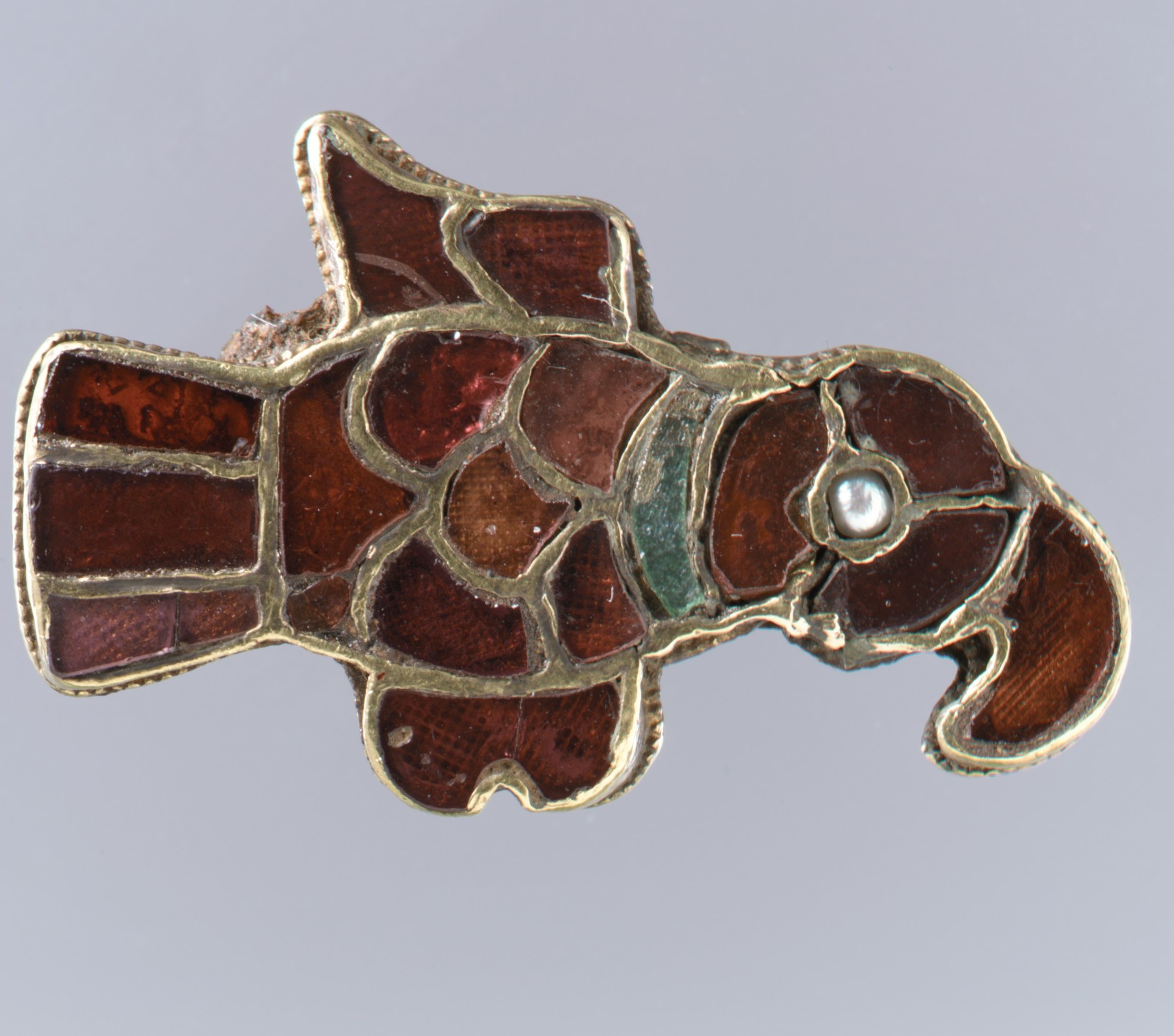
Frankish bird brooch

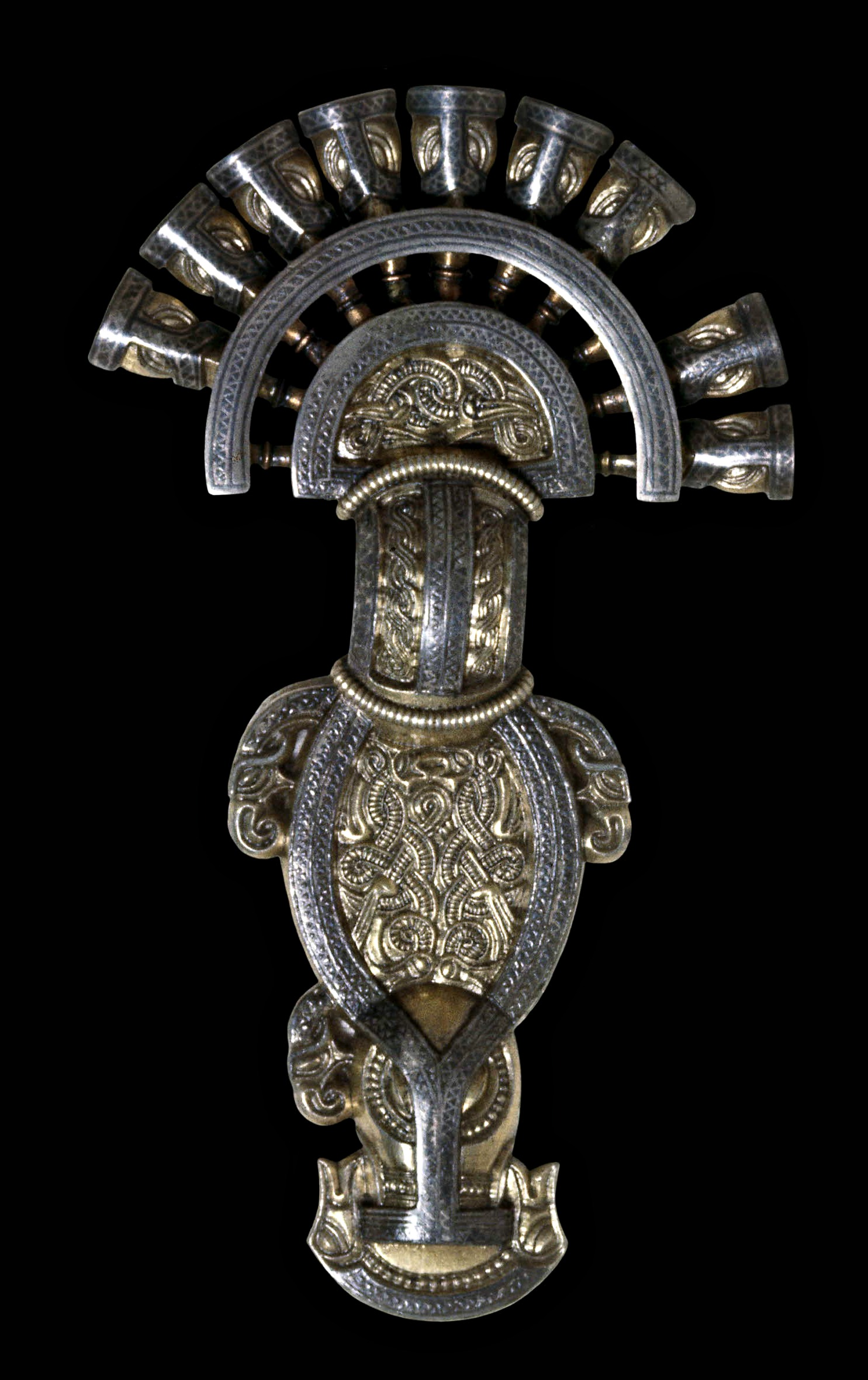
Lombardic brooch

=== Anglo-Saxon ===
The majority of brooches found in early Anglo-Saxon England were Continental styles that had migrated from Europe and Scandinavia. The long brooch style was most commonly found in 5th- and 6th-century England. Circular brooches first appeared in England in the middle of the 5th century. During the 6th century, craftsmen from Kent began manufacturing brooches using their own distinctive styles and techniques. The circular form was the preferred brooch type by the end of the 6th century. During the 7th century, all brooches in England were in decline. They reappeared in the 8th century and continued to be fashionable through the end of the Anglo-Saxon era.

Brooch styles were predominantly circular by the middle to late Anglo-Saxon era. During this time period, the preferred styles were the annular and jewelled (Kentish) disc brooch styles. The circular forms can be divided generally into enamelled and non-enamelled styles. A few non-circular style were fashionable during the 8th to 11th centuries. The ansate, the safety-pin, the strip and a few other styles can be included in this group. Ansate brooches were traditional brooches from Europe migrated to England and became fashionable in the late Anglo-Saxon period. Safety-pin brooches, more abundant in the early Anglo-Saxon period, became more uncommon by the 7th century, and by the 8th century evolved into the strip brooch. Miscellaneous brooches during this time period include the bird, the ottonian, the rectangle and the cross motif.

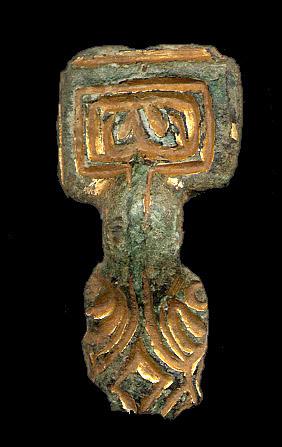
Square-headed brooch

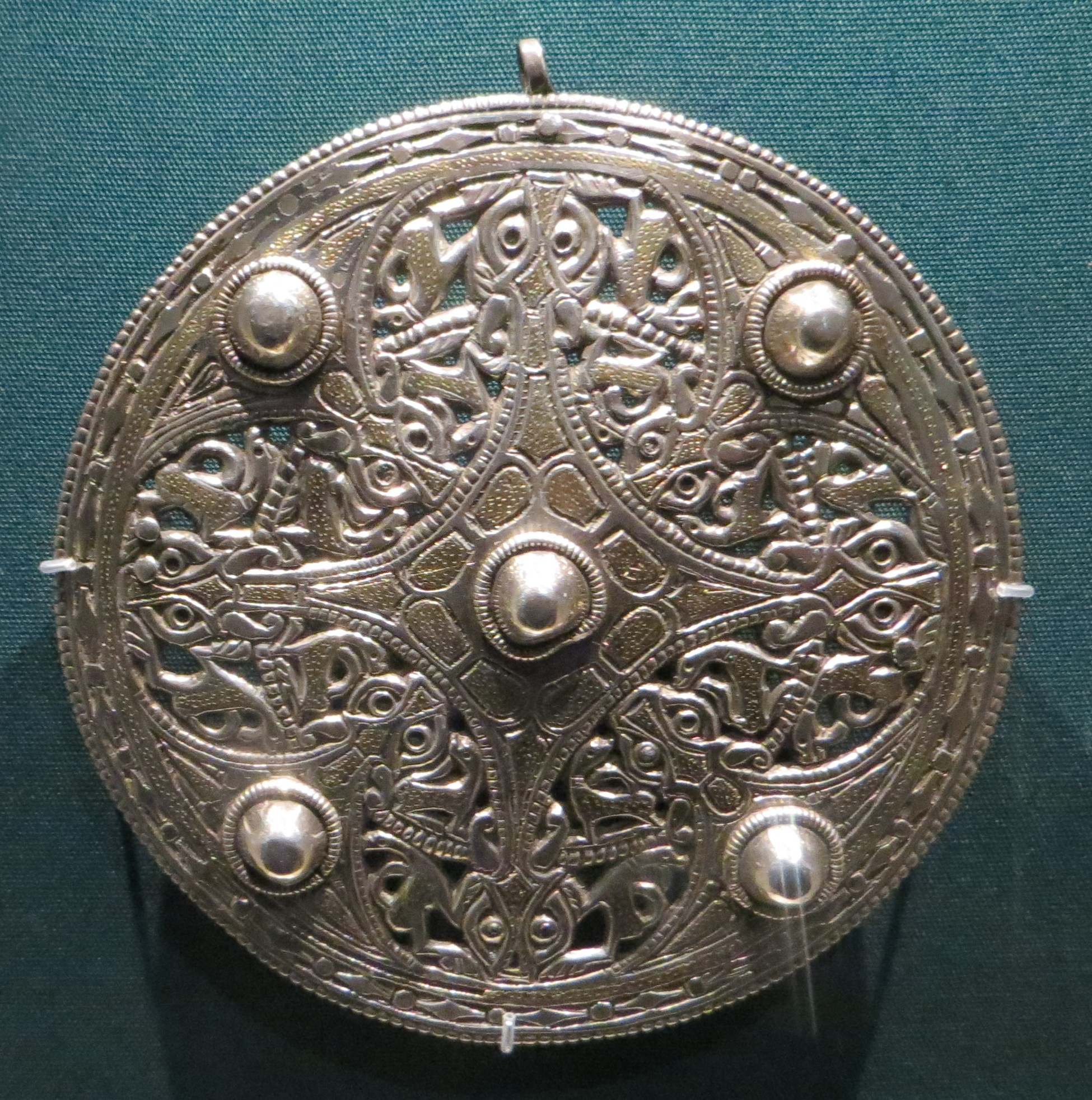
Strickland Brooch

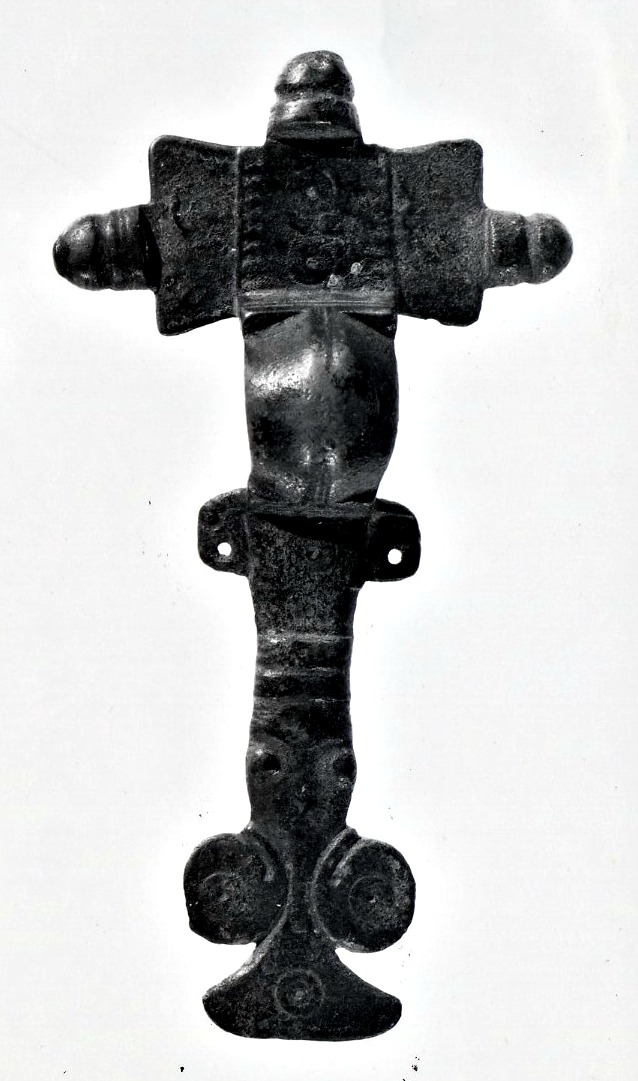
Cruciform brooch

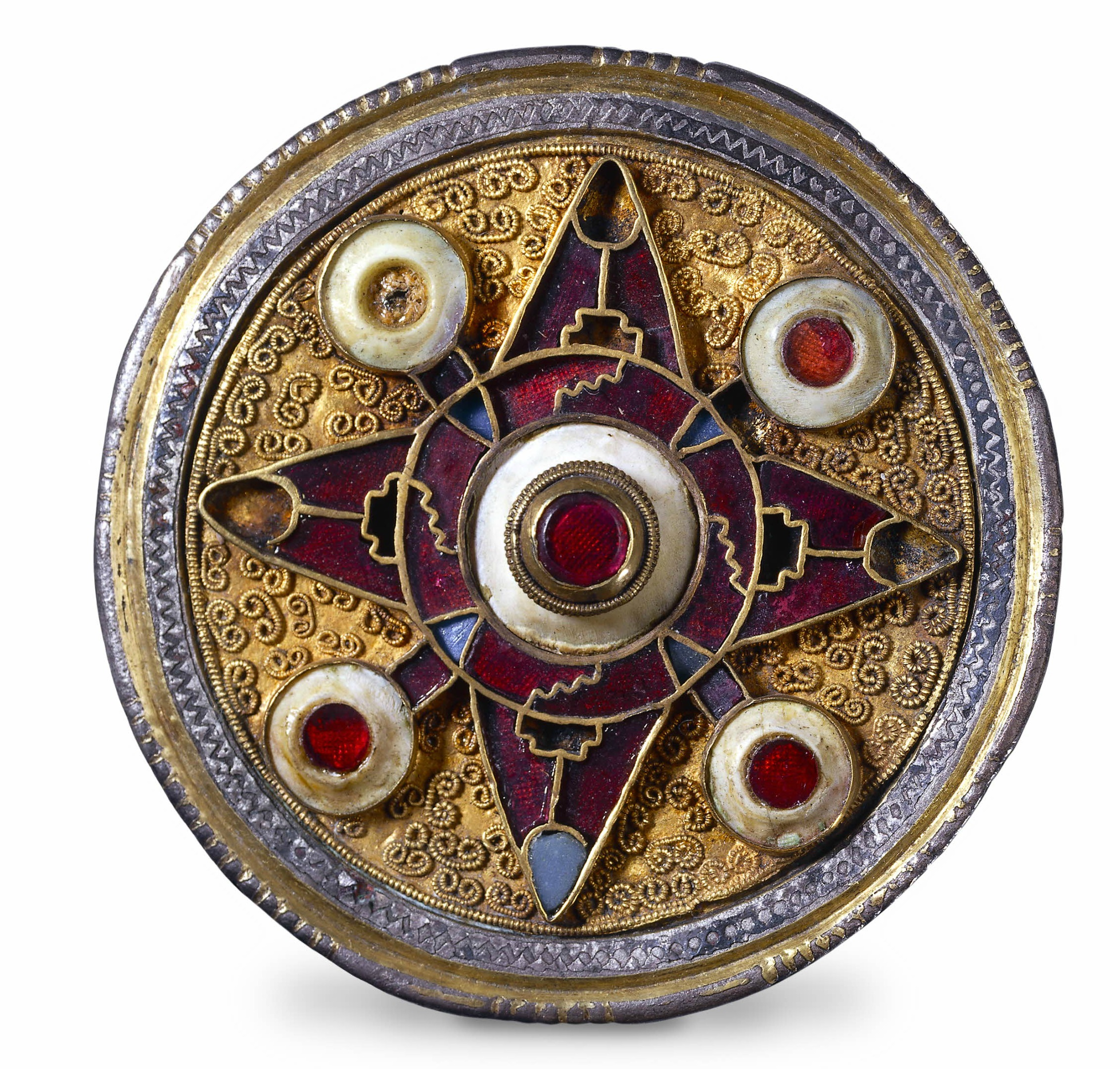
Plated disc brooch

=== Celtic ===
Celtic brooches represent a distinct tradition of elaborately decorated penannular and pseudo-penannular brooch types developed in Early Medieval Ireland and Scotland. Techniques, styles and materials used by the Celts were different from Anglo-Saxon craftsmen. Certain attributes of Celtic jewellery, such as inlaid millefiori glass and curvilinear styles have more in common with ancient brooches than contemporary Anglo-Saxon jewellery. The jewellery of Celtic artisans is renowned for its inventiveness, complexity of design and craftsmanship. The Tara Brooch is a well-known example of a Celtic brooch.

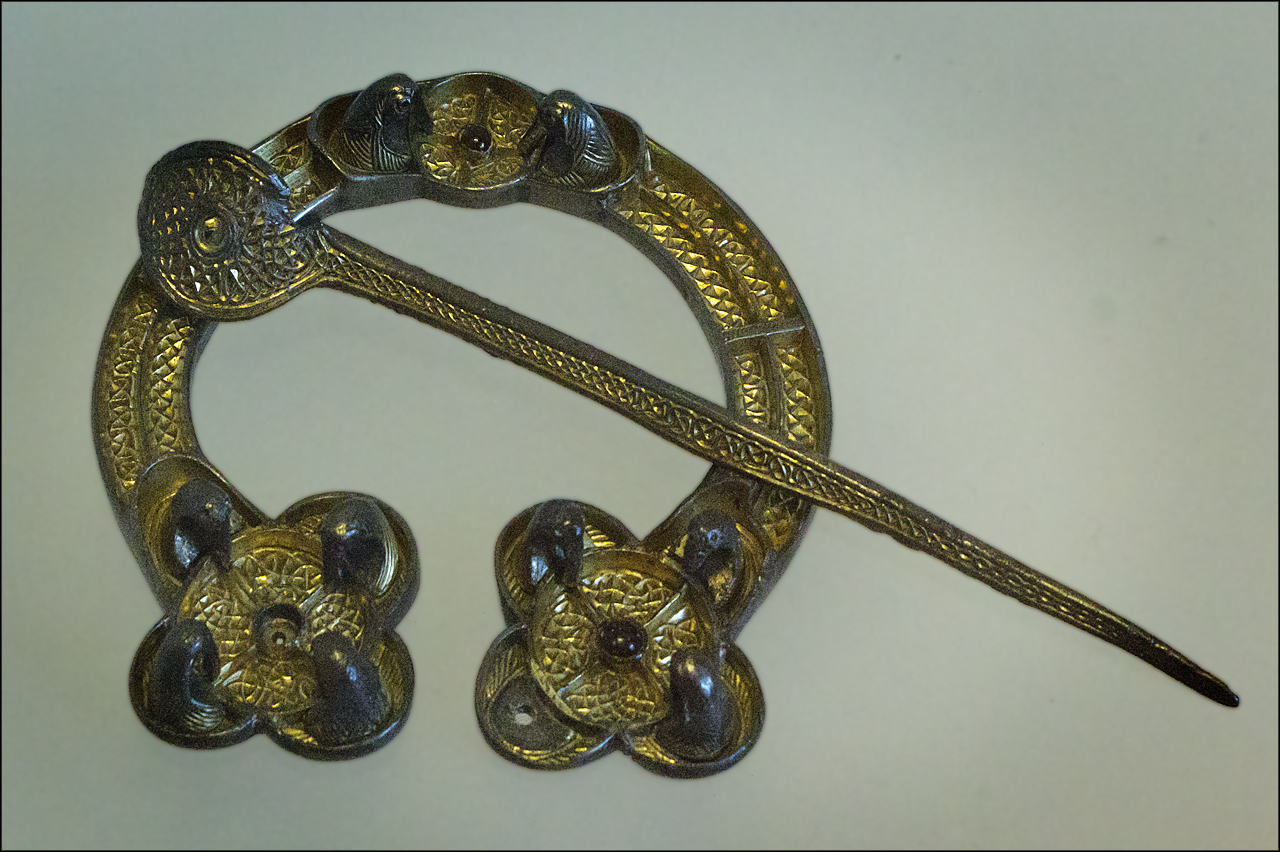
The penannular Rogart Brooch

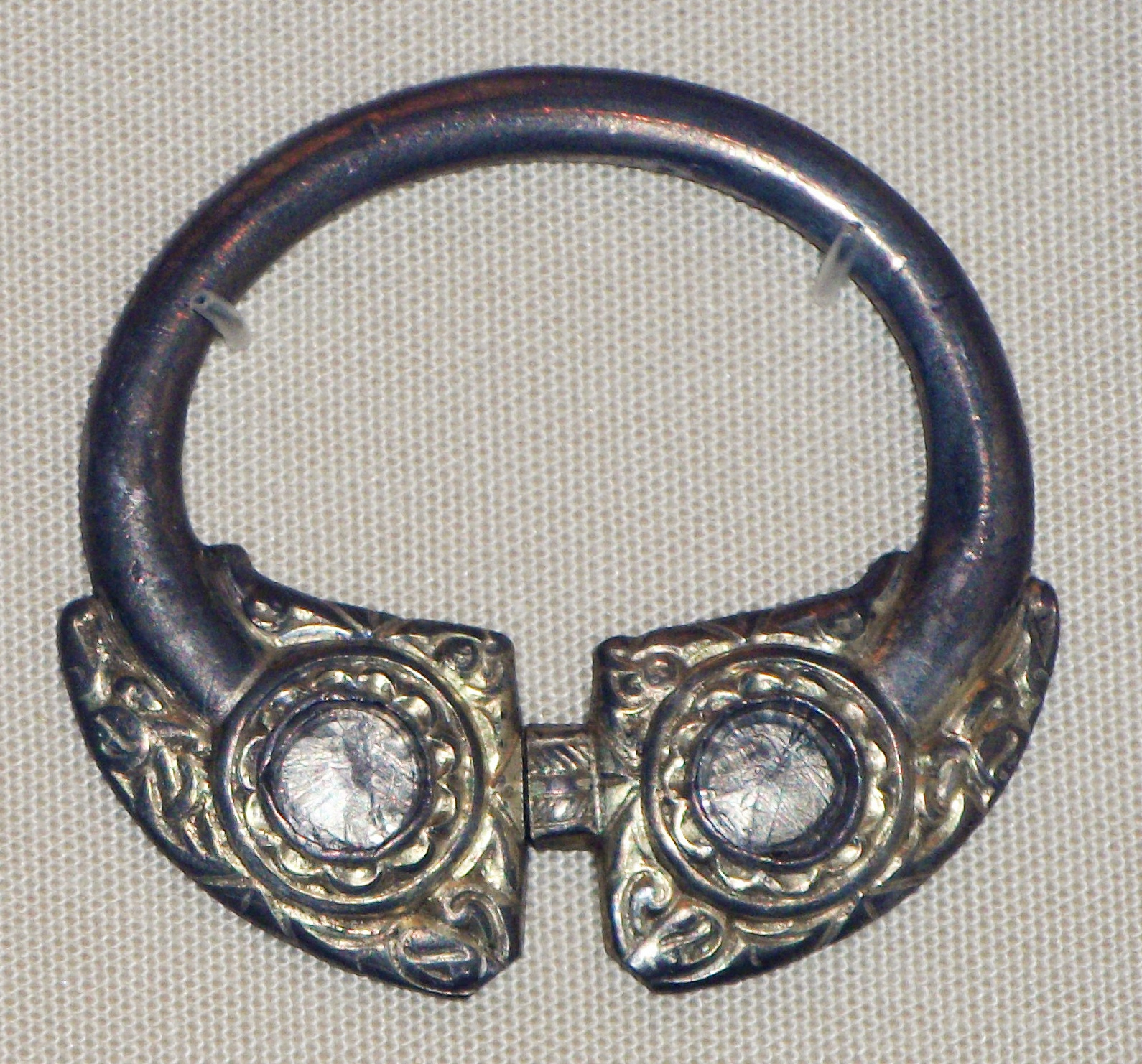
Pseudo-penannular brooch

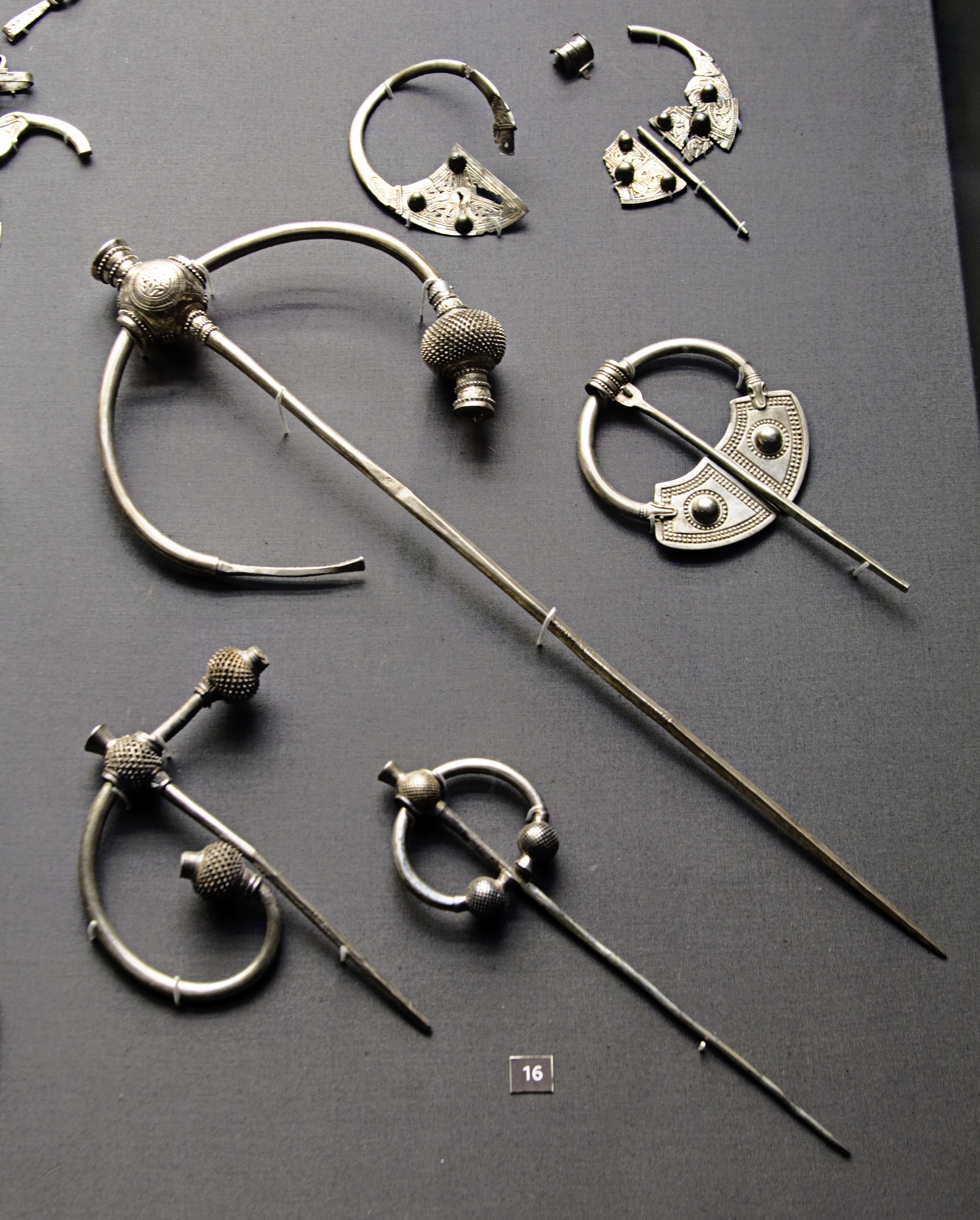
Penrith Hoard

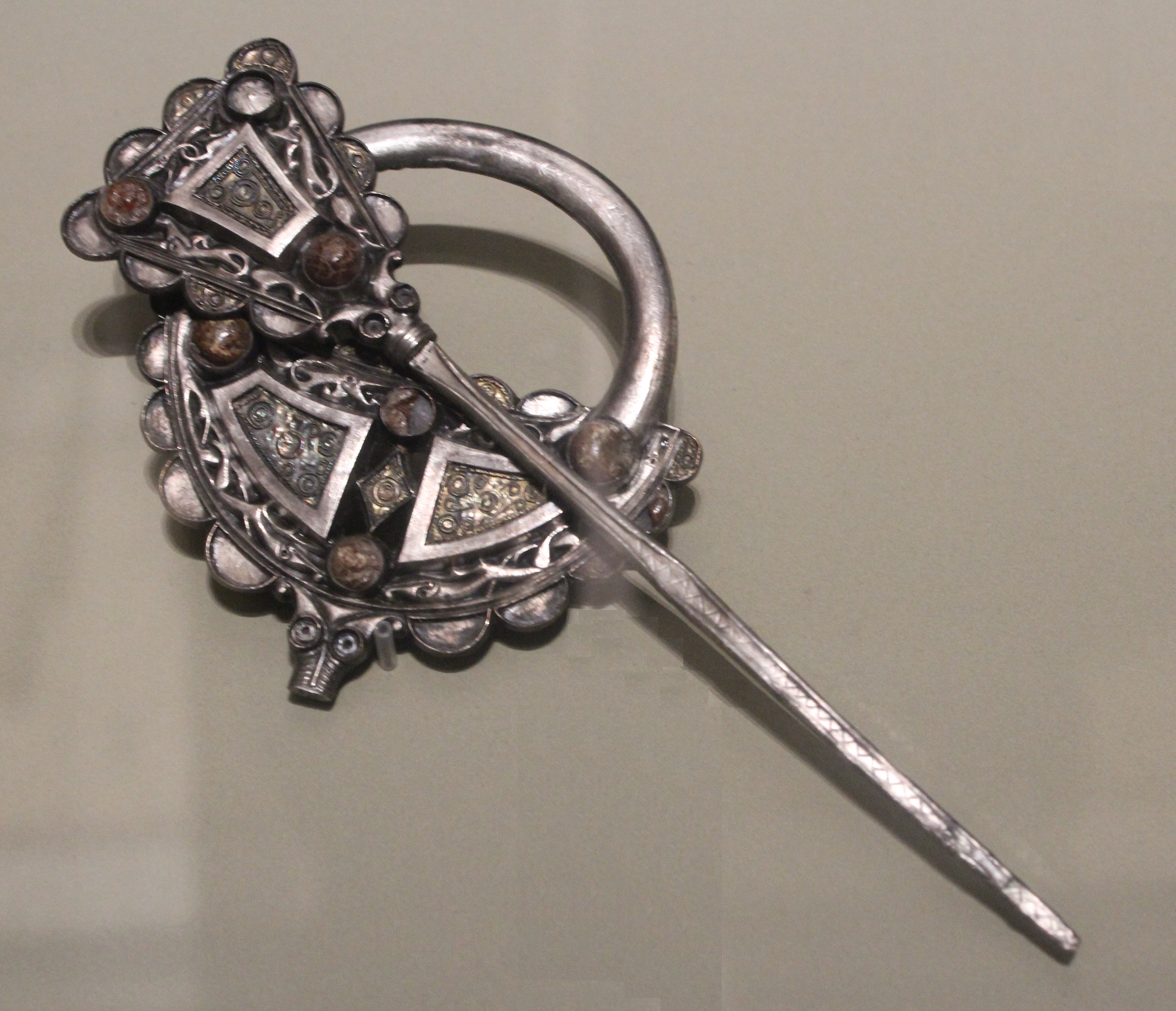
Roscrea Brooch, 9th century

=== Scandinavian ===
Germanic Animal Style decoration was the foundation of Scandinavian art that was produced during the Middle Ages. The lively decorative style originated in Denmark in the late fifth century as an insular response to Late Roman style metalwork. During the early medieval period, Scandinavian craftsmen created intricately carved brooches with their signature animal style ornamentation. The brooches were generally made of copper alloy or silver.

Beginning in the eighth century and lasting until the eleventh century, Scandinavian seafarers were exploring, raiding and colonising Europe, Great Britain and new lands to the west. This era of Scandinavian expansion is known as the Viking Age, and the art created during this time period is known as Viking art. Metalwork, including brooches, produced during this period were decorated in one or more of the Viking art styles. These five sequential styles are: Oseberg, Borre, Jellinge, Mammen, Ringerike and Urnes.

A variety of Scandinavian brooch forms were common during this period: circular, bird-shaped, oval, equal-armed, trefoil, lozenge-shaped, and domed disc. The most common Scandinavian art styles of the period are the Jellinge and Borre art styles. Some of the characteristics of these related art styles are: interlaced gripping beasts, single animal motifs, ribbon-shaped animals, knot and ring-chain patterns, tendrils, and leaf, beast and bird motifs.

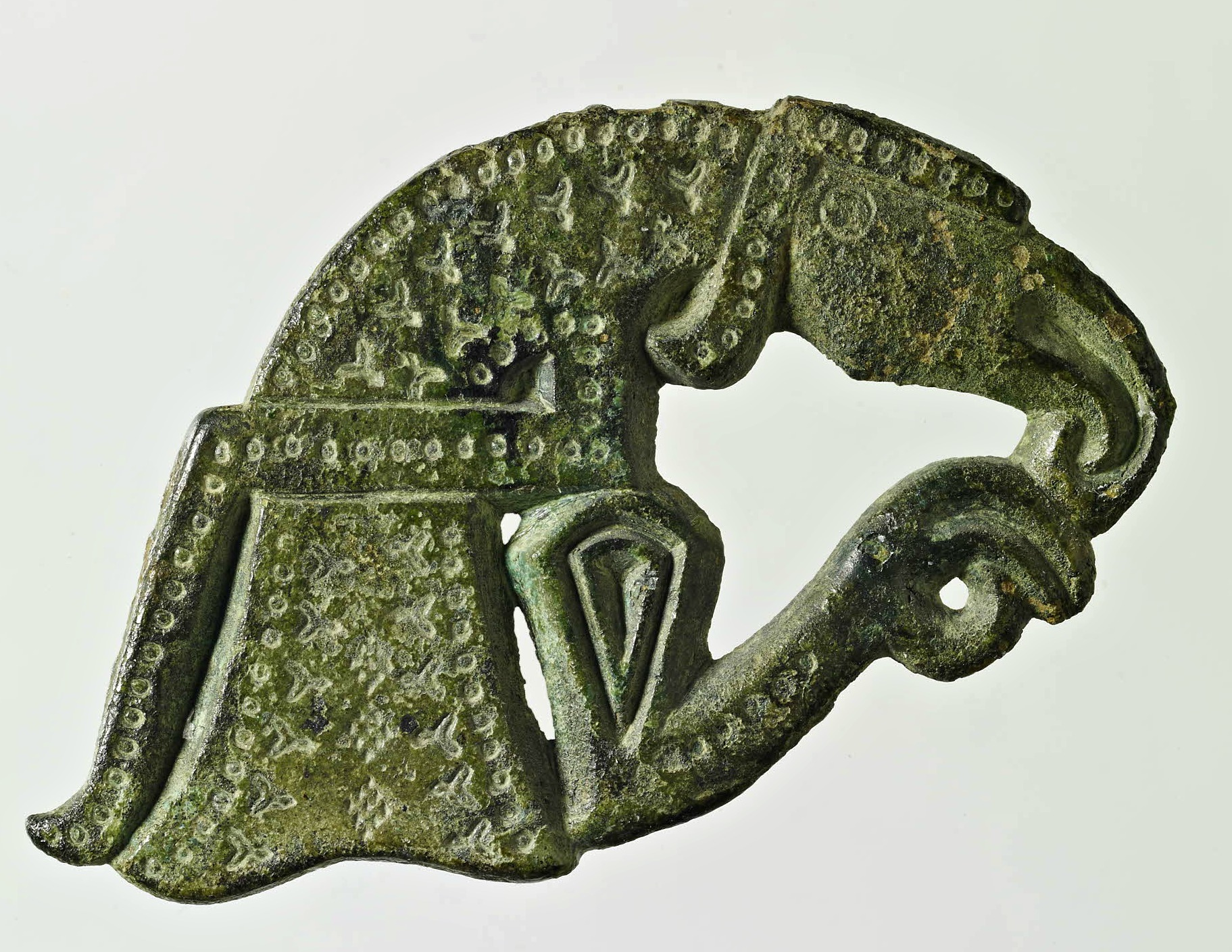
Style II bird brooch

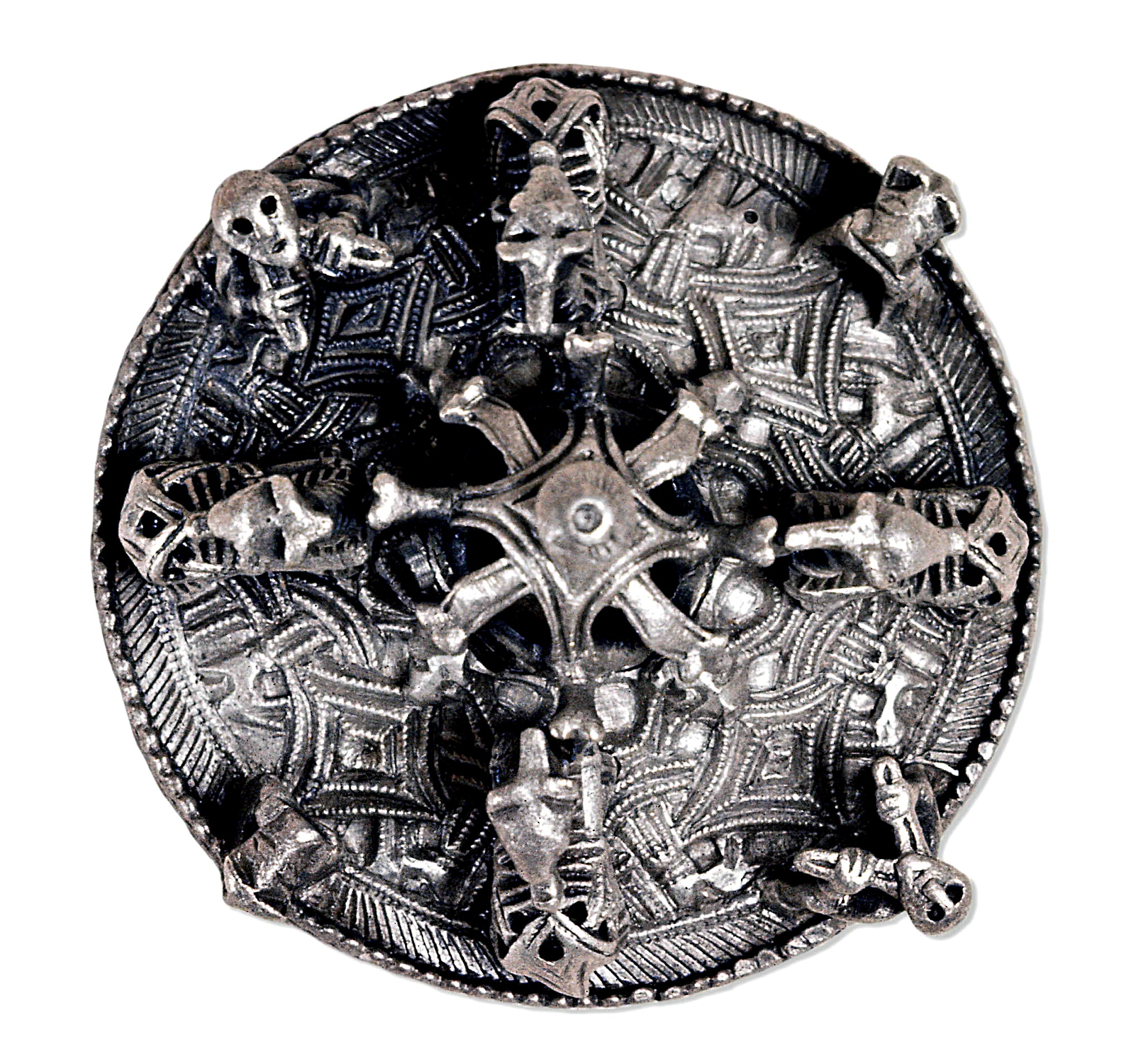
Borre style brooch

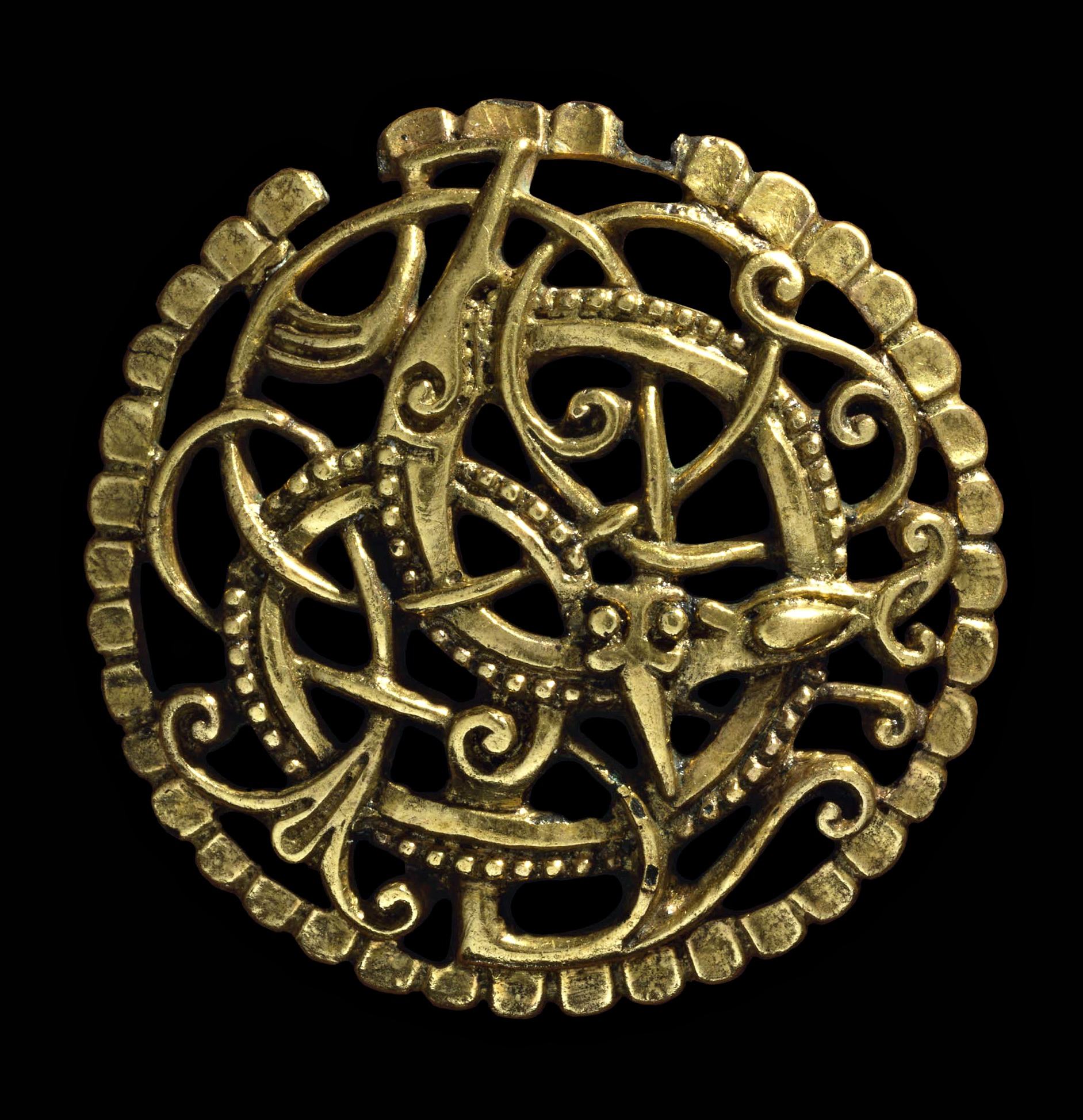
Urnes style brooch

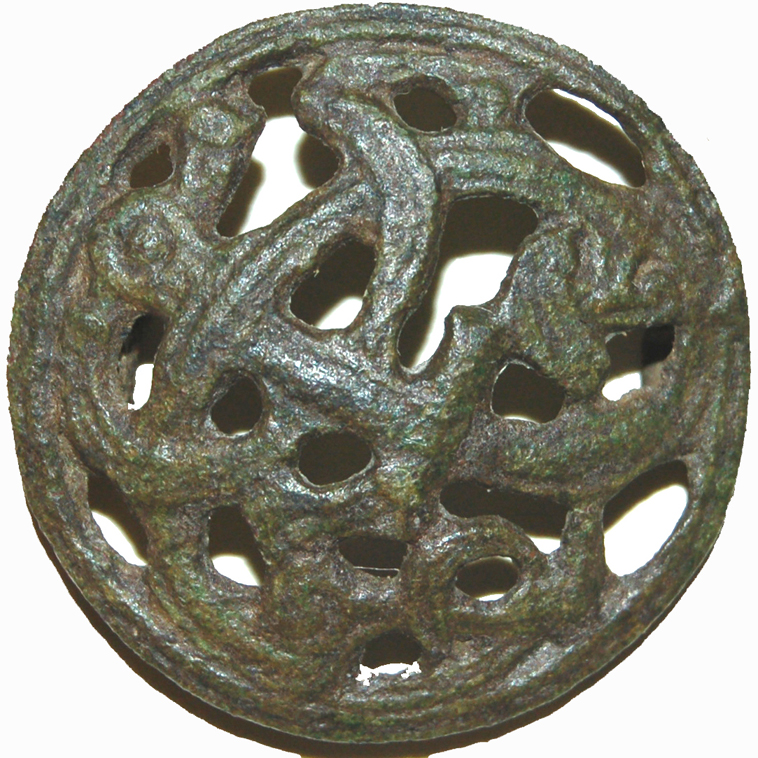
Jellinge style brooch

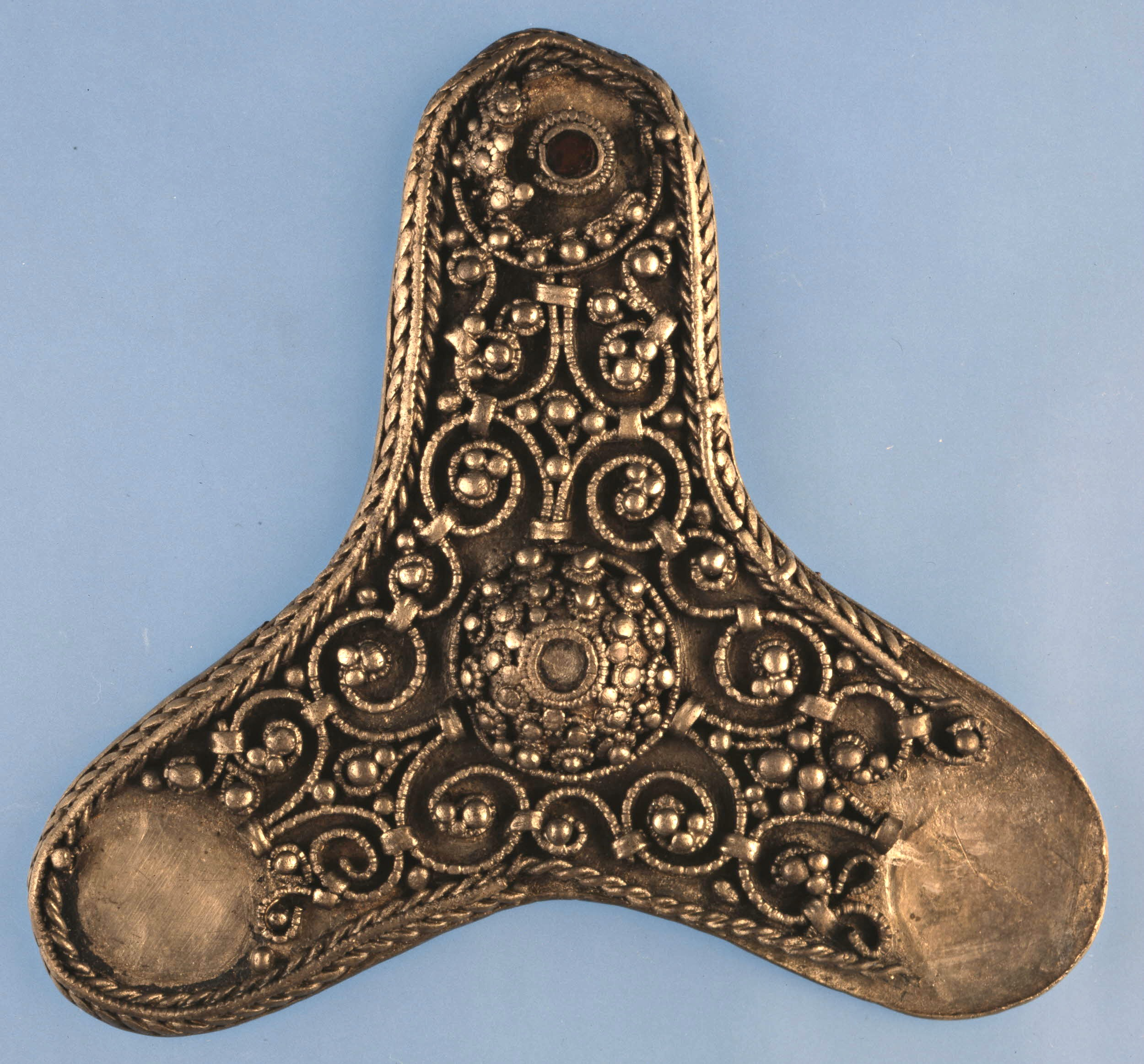
Trefoil brooch

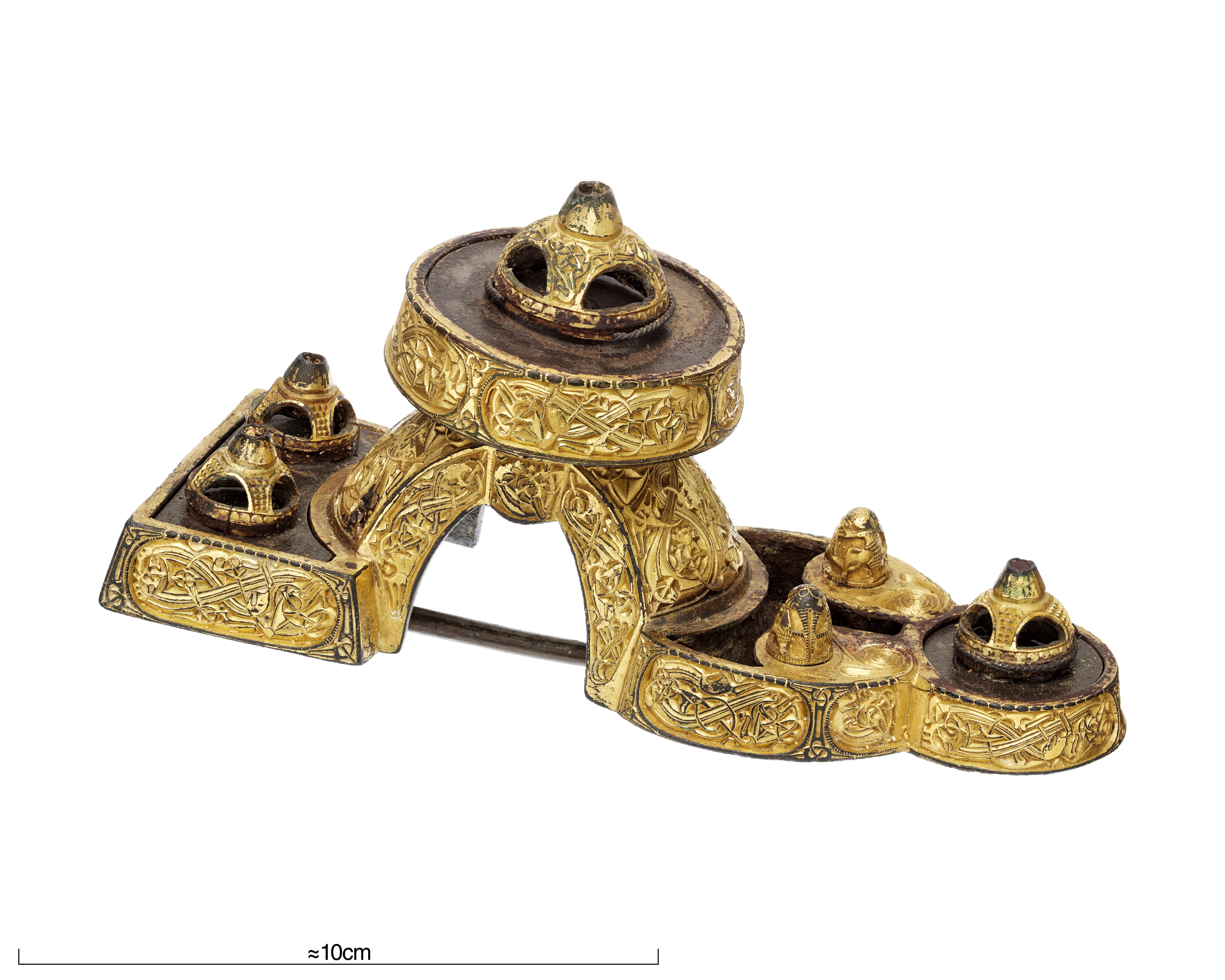
Broa style disc-on-bow brooch

=== Late medieval ===
Brooches found during the late medieval era, (1300 to 1500 AD), were worn by both men and women. Brooch shapes were generally: star-shaped, pentagonal, lobed, wheel, heart-shaped, and ring. Rings were smaller than other brooches, and often used to fasten clothing at the neck. Brooch decoration usually consisted of a simple inscription or gems applied to a gold or silver base. Inscriptions of love, friendship and faith were a typical feature of ring brooches of this period. The heart-shaped brooch was a very popular gift between lovers or friends.

Amulet brooches were very common prior to medieval times. In late antiquity, they were embellished with symbols of pagan deities or gems that held special powers to protect the wearer from harm. These pagan inspired brooches continued to be worn after the spread of Christianity. Pagan and Christian symbols were often combined to decorate brooches during the Middle Ages. Beginning in the fourteenth century, three-dimensional brooches appeared for the first time. The Dunstable Swan Brooch is a well-known example of a three-dimensional brooch.

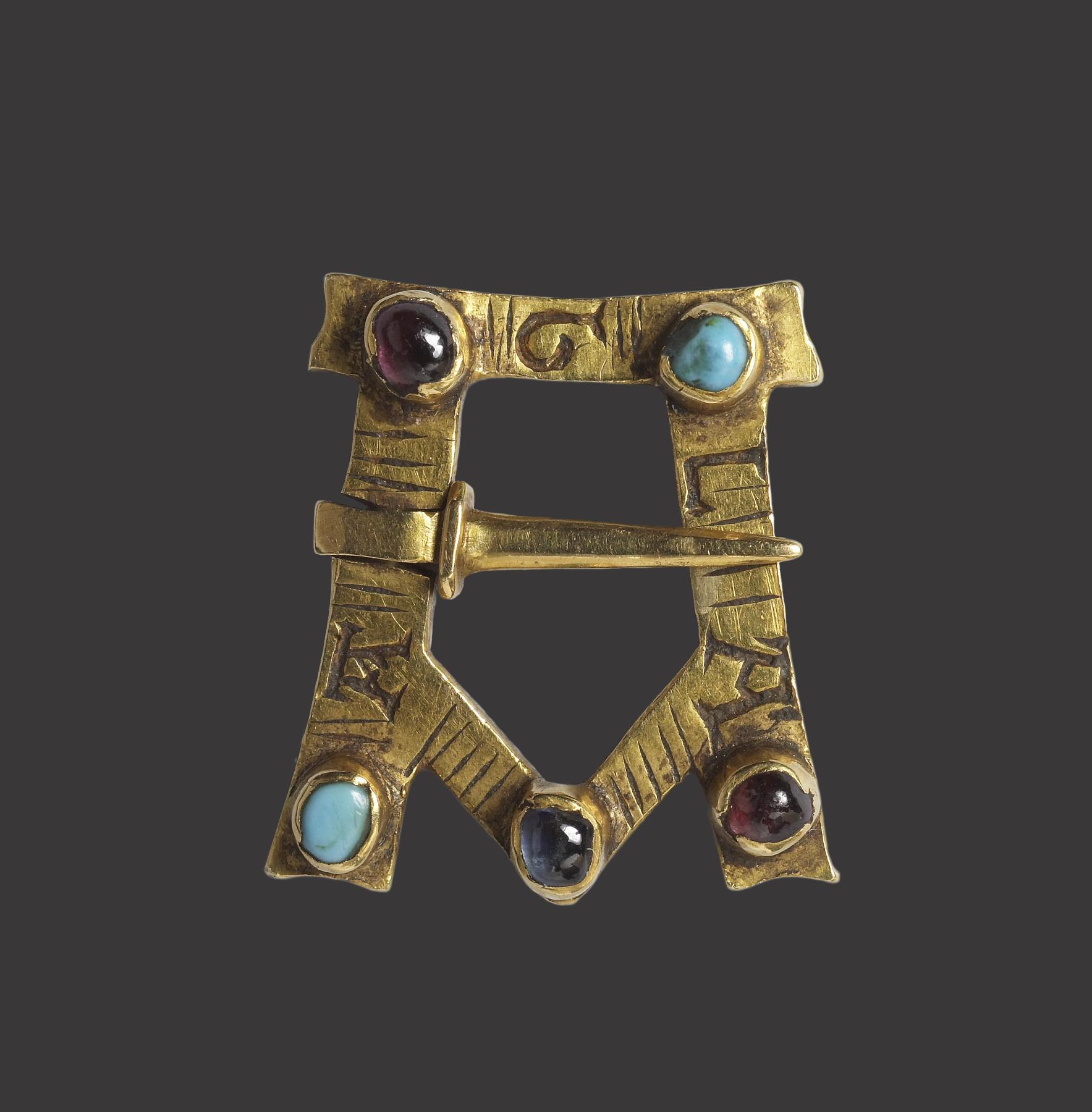
Amuletic brooch

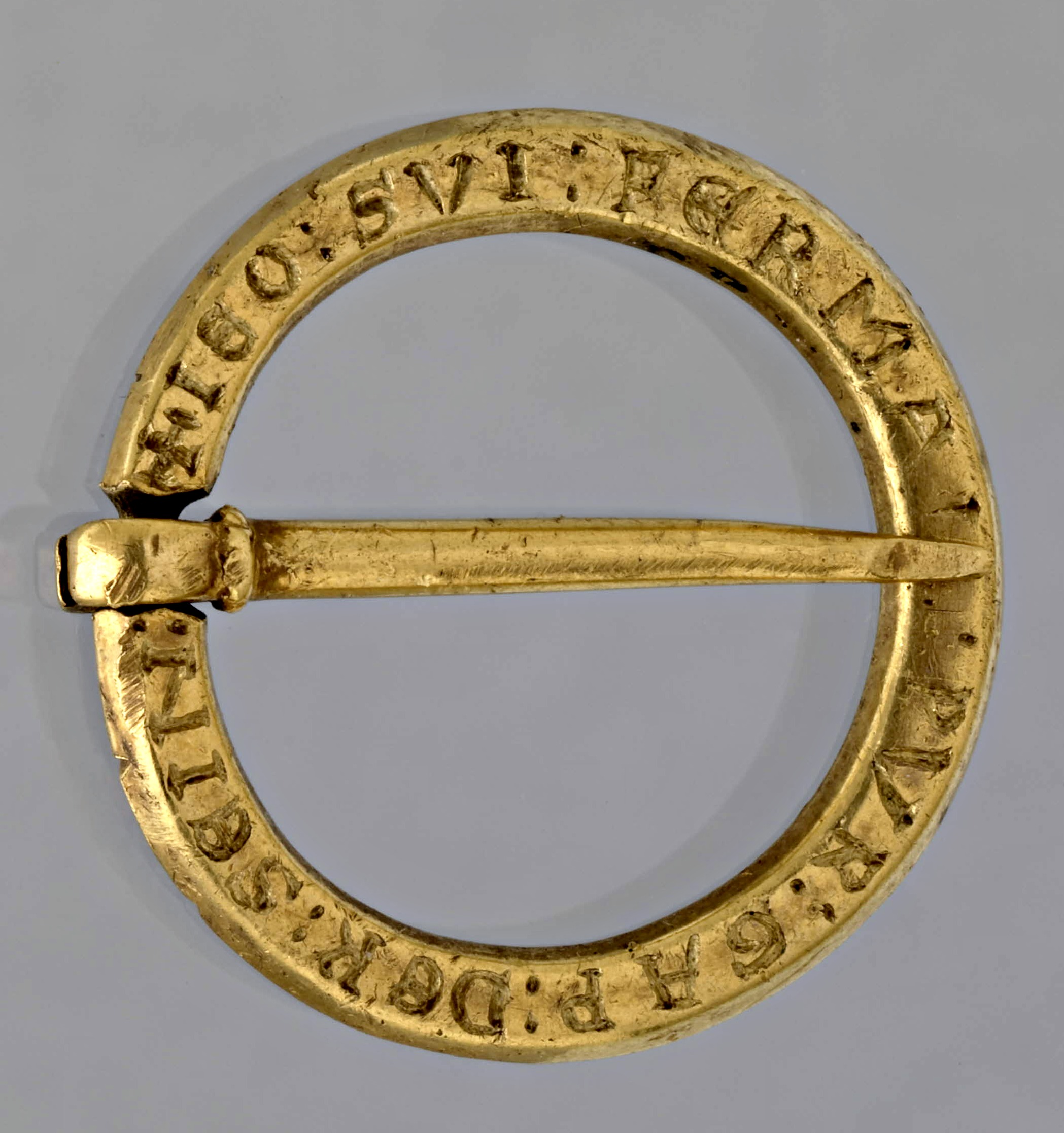
Annular brooch 13th century

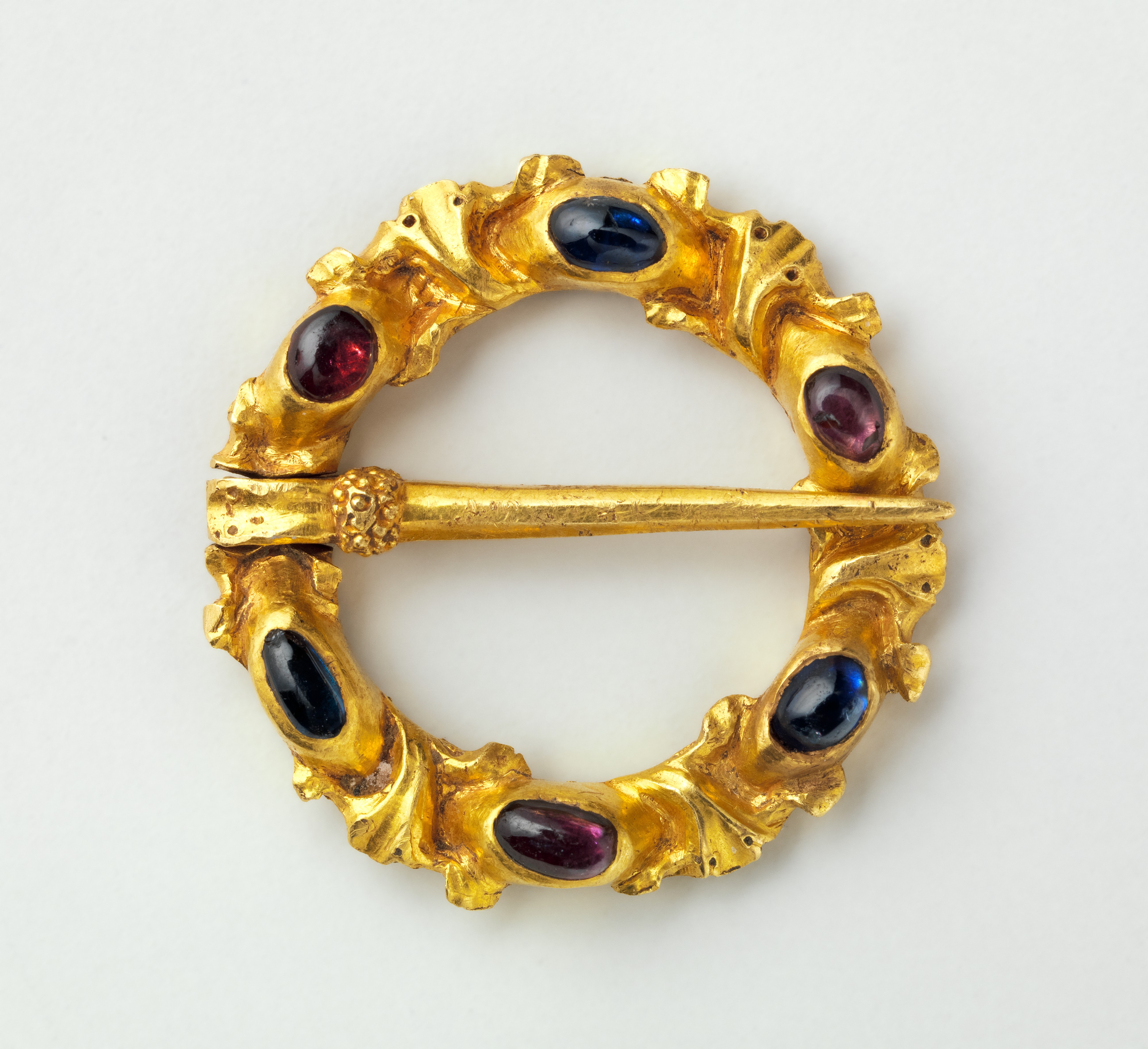
French ring brooch 13th century

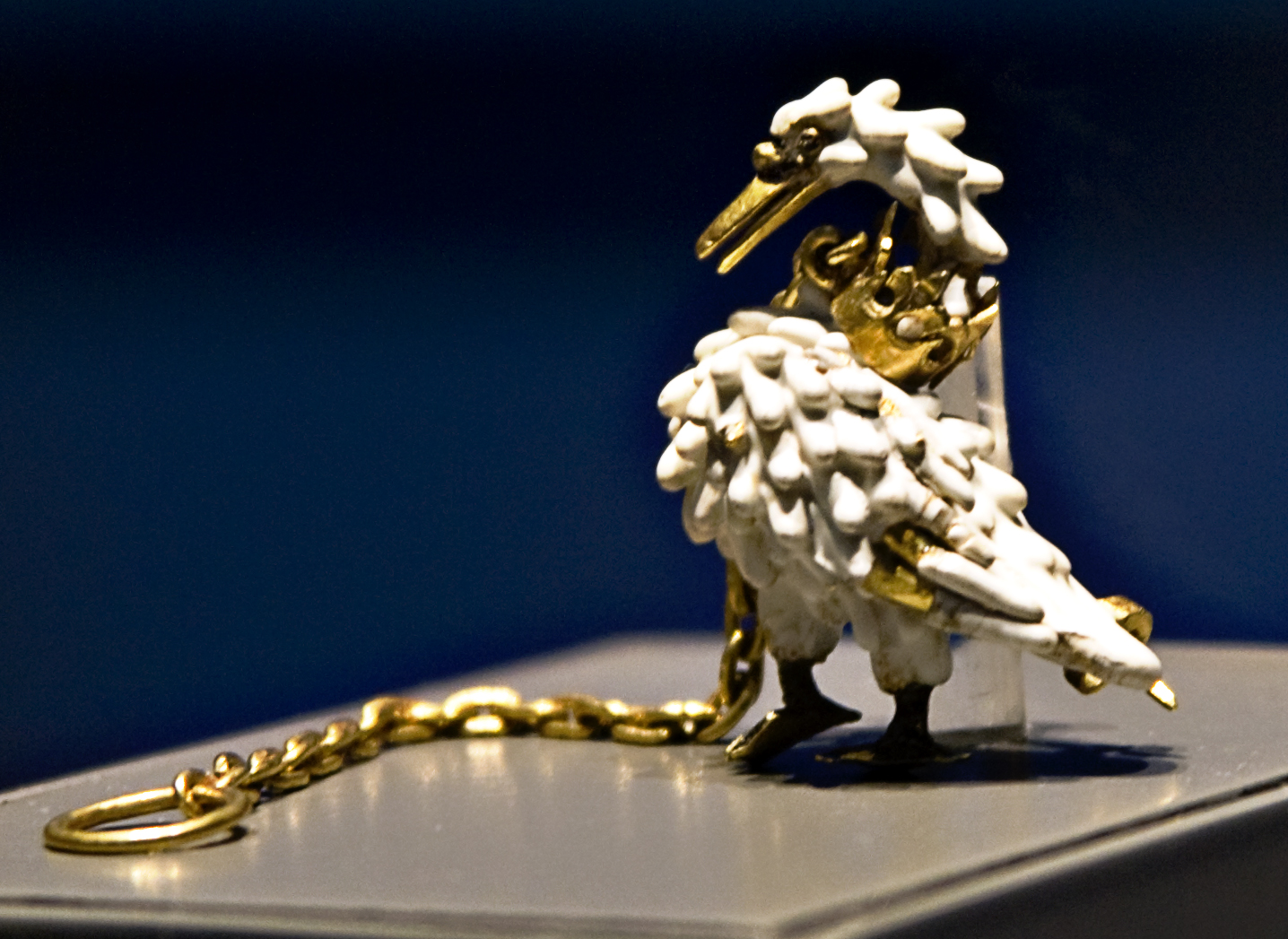
Dunstable Swan Jewel 14th century

== Early modern brooches ==
The early modern period of jewellery extended from 1500 to 1800. Global exploration and colonisation brought new prosperity to Europe and Great Britain along with new sources of diamonds, gems, pearls, and precious metals. The rapid changes in clothing fashion during this era generated similar changes in jewellery styles. The demand for new jewellery resulted in the deconstruction and melting down of many old jewellery pieces to create new jewellery. Because of this, there are very few surviving jewellery pieces from this era. The primary jewellery styles during this time period are: Renaissance, Georgian and Neoclassical.

=== Renaissance ===
The Renaissance period in jewellery (1300–1600) was a time of wealth and opulence. Elaborate brooches covered in gemstones or pearls were in fashion, especially with the upper classes. Gemstones commonly used for brooches were emeralds, diamonds, rubies, amethyst and topaz. Brooches with religious motifs and enamelled miniature portraits were popular during this time period. Gems were often selected for their protective properties as well as their vibrant colours. During the fifteenth century, new cutting techniques inspired new gemstone shapes.

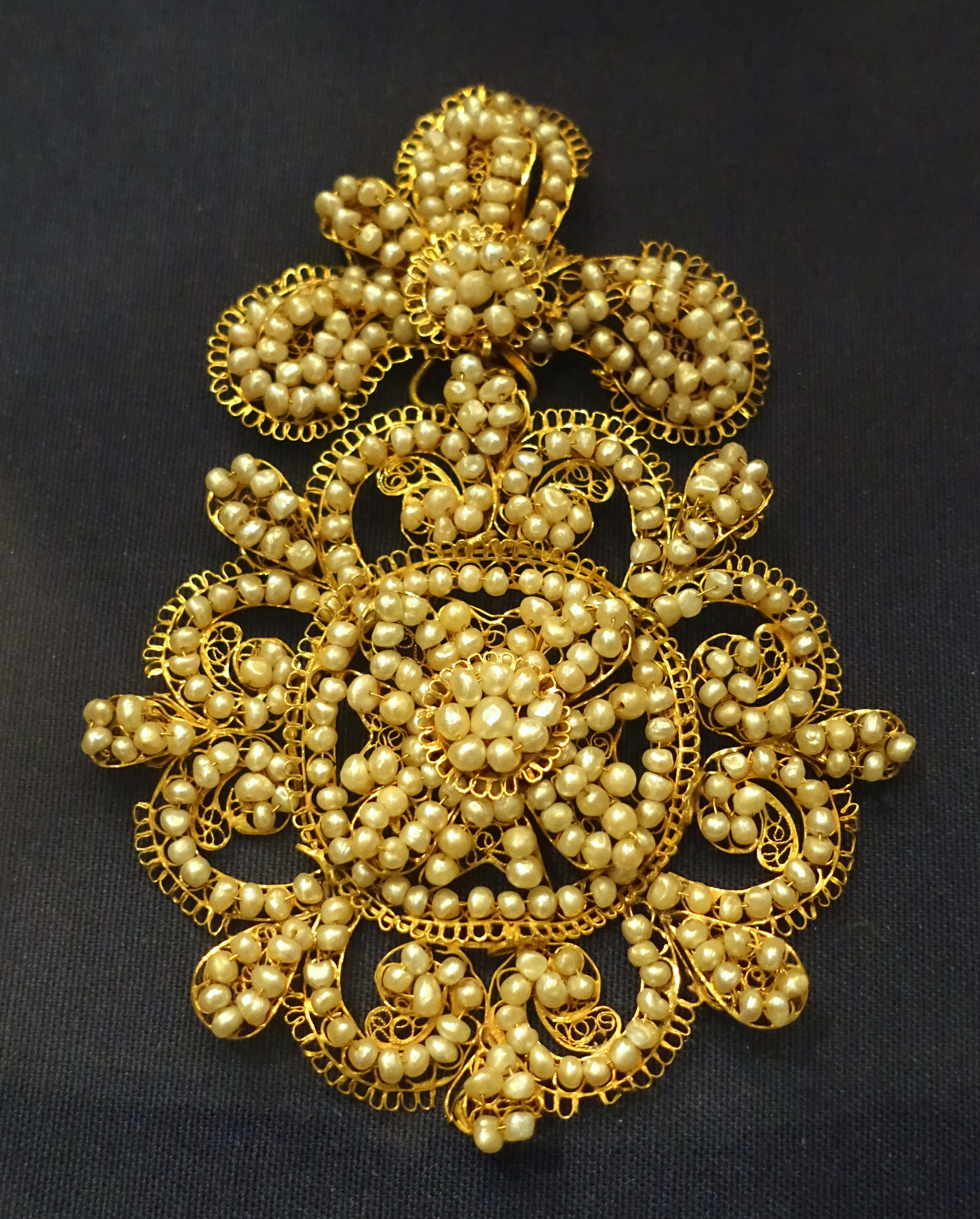
Seventeenth century

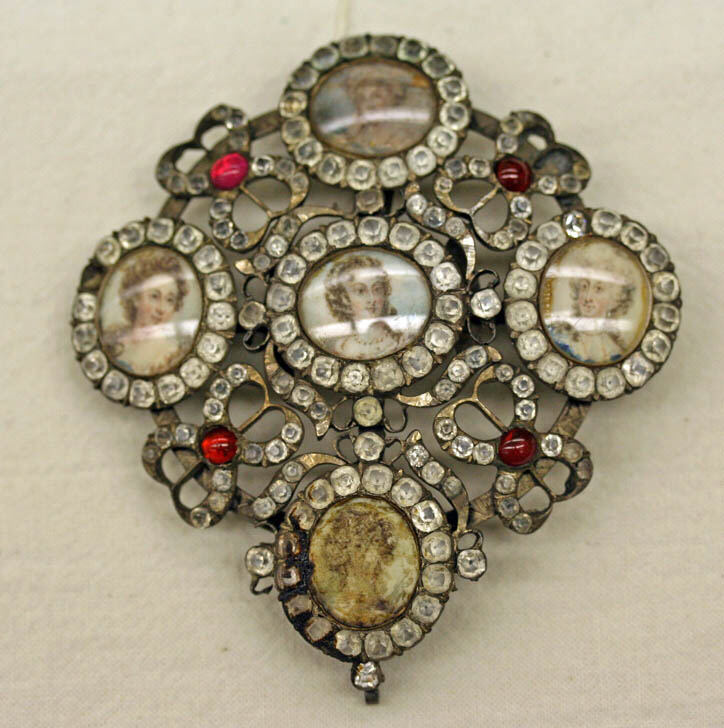
Eighteenth century

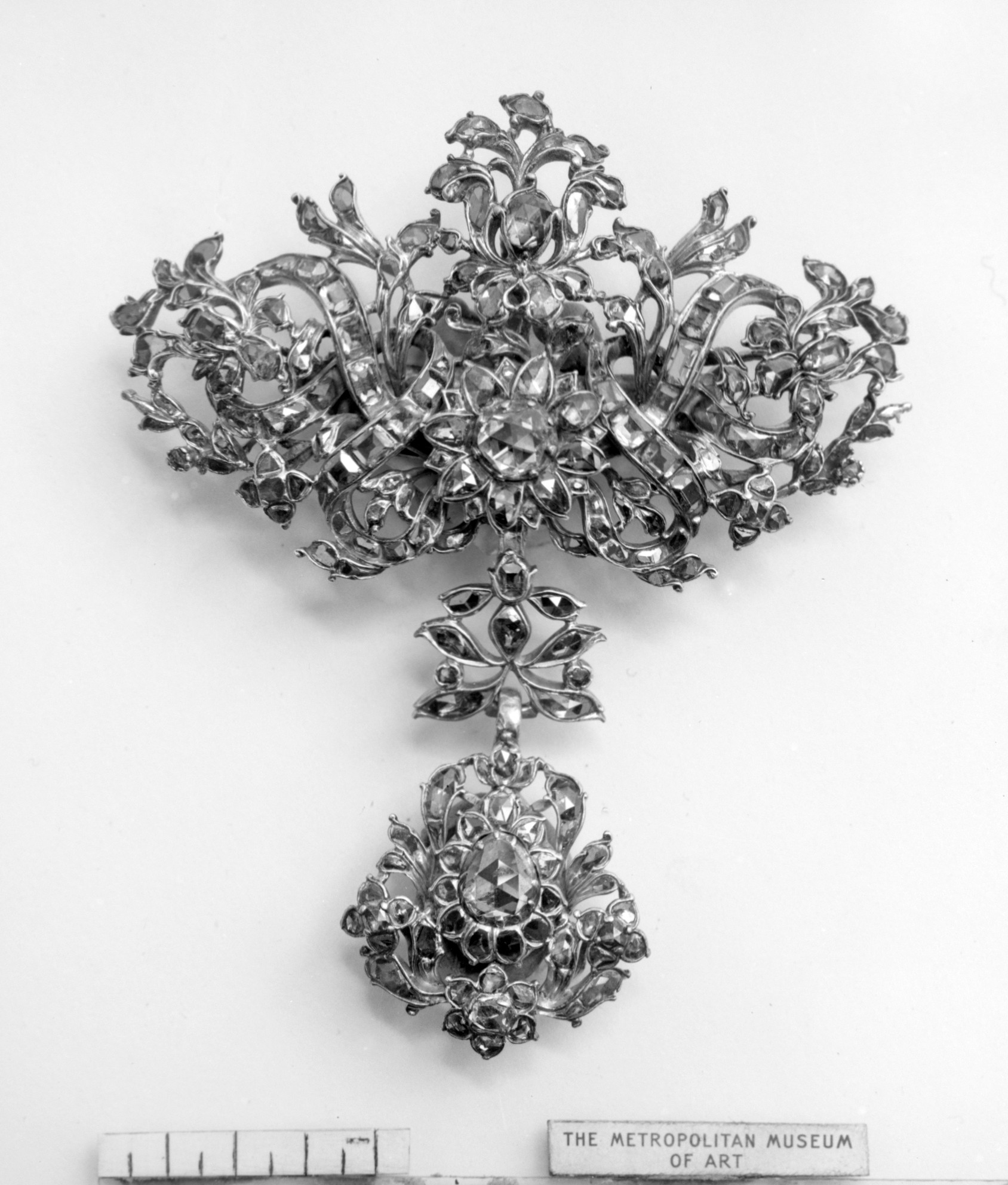
Eighteenth century

=== Georgian ===
The Georgian jewellery era (1710–1830) was named after the four King Georges of England. In the early 1700s, ornate brooches with complex designs were fashionable. By the mid- to late 1700s, simpler forms and designs were more common, with simpler themes of nature, bows, miniature portraits and animals. Georgian jewellery was typically handmade in gold or silver. Diamonds and pearls continued to be fashionable during this period.

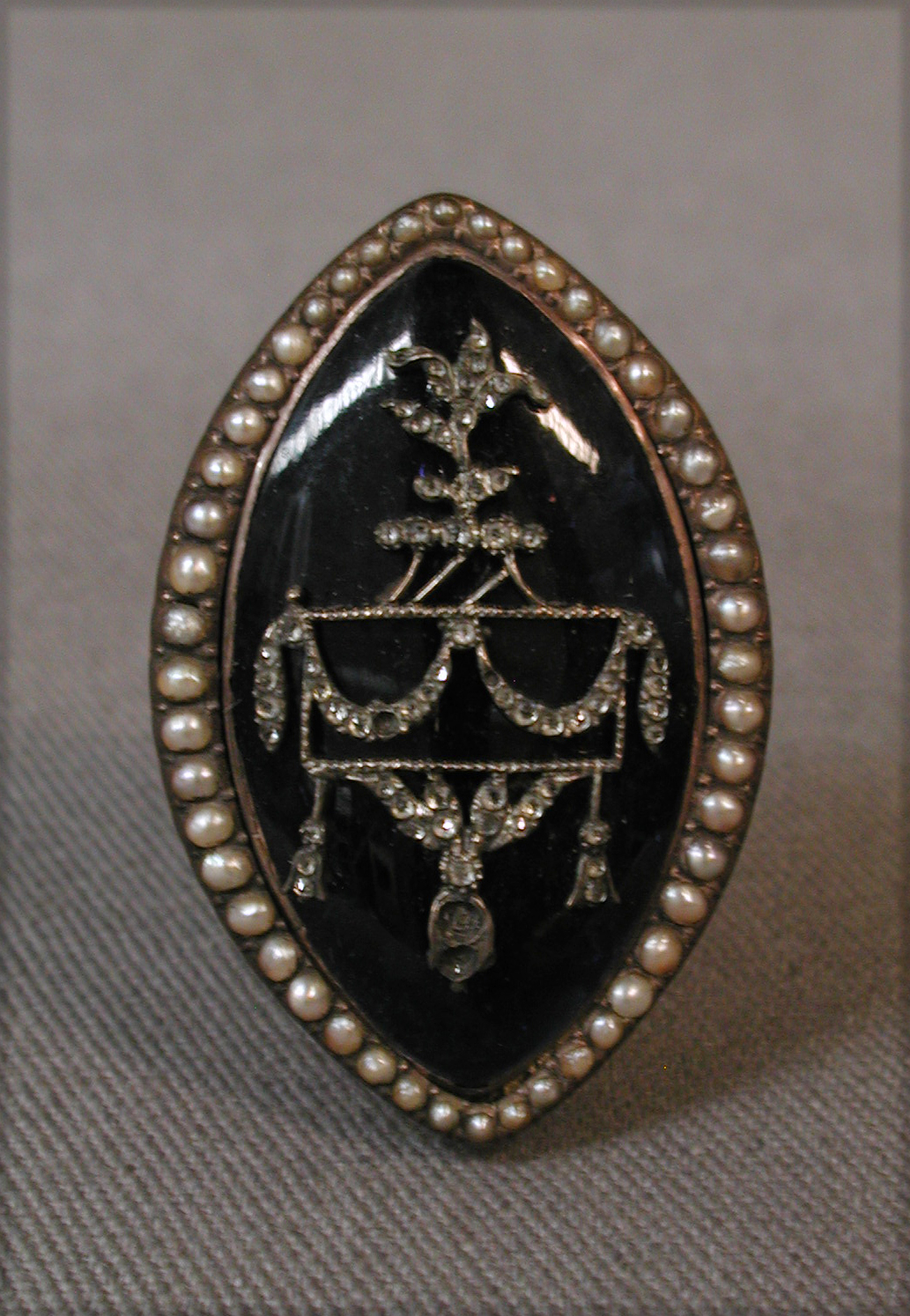
late 18th century brooch

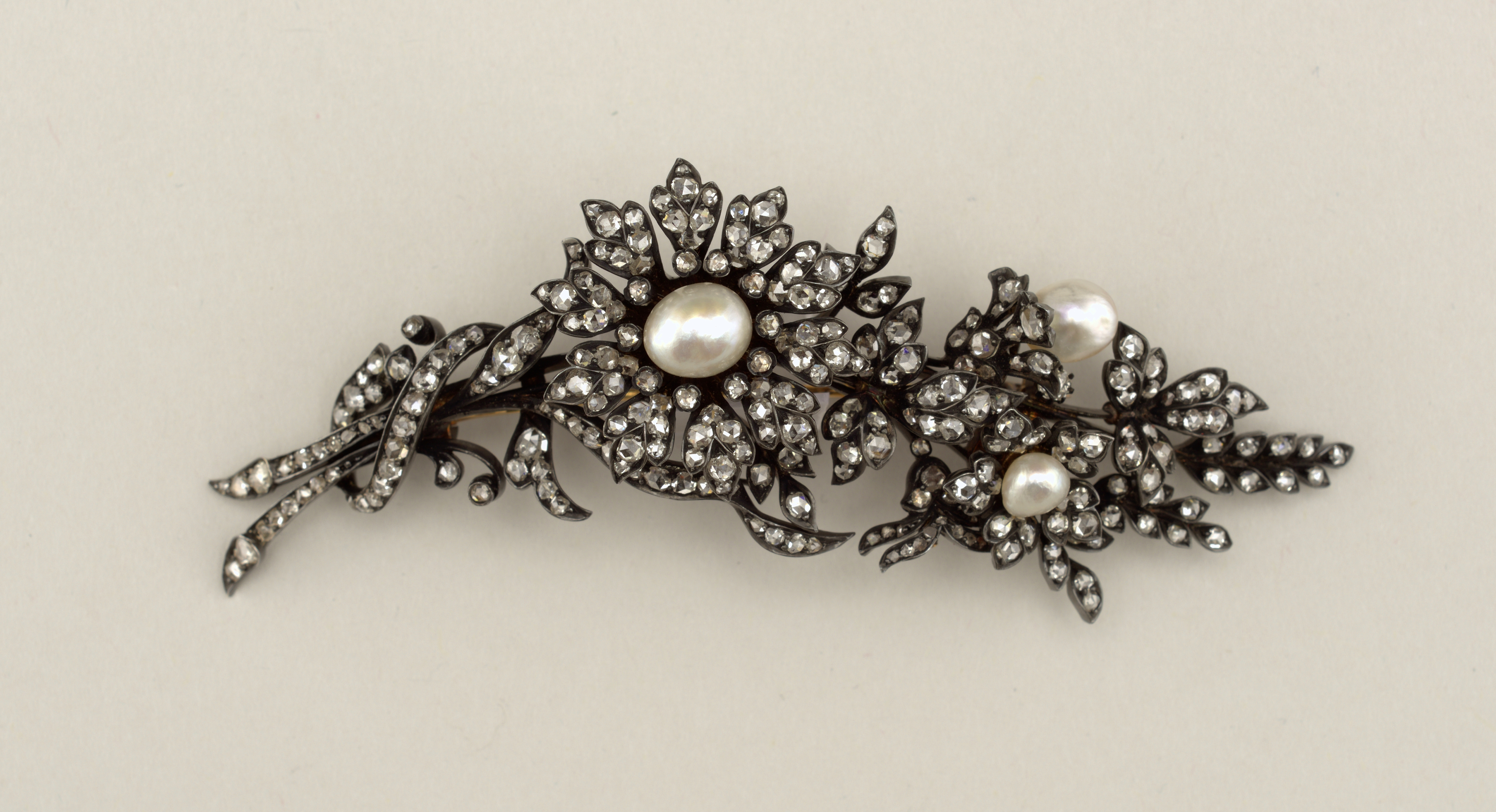
18th century diamond brooch

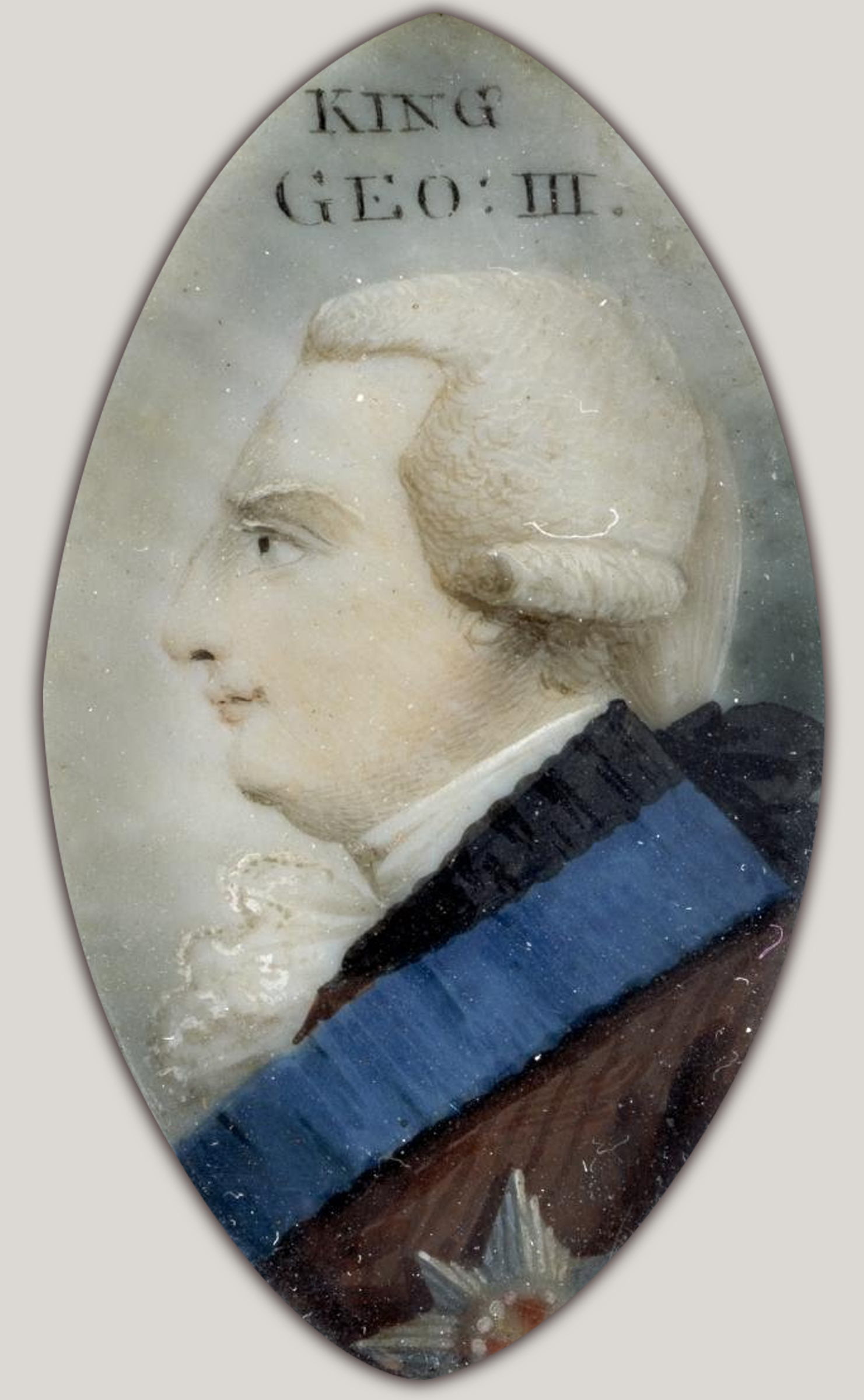
George III portrait brooch

=== Neoclassical ===
The Neoclassical era (1760–1830) in jewellery design was inspired by classical themes of ancient Greece and Rome. The main difference between Renaissance jewellery and neoclassical jewellery was that Renaissance jewellery was created primarily for the upper class and neoclassical jewellery was made for the general public. An important innovation in jewellery making during this era was the technique of producing cameos with hard pastes called black basalt and jasper. English pottery manufacturer Josiah Wedgwood is responsible for this important contribution to jewellery making. Cameos and brooches with classical scenes were fashionable during this period. Pearls and gemstones continued to be used in brooches, but were less popular than before. The beginning of the French Revolution halted the manufacture and demand for opulent jewellery.

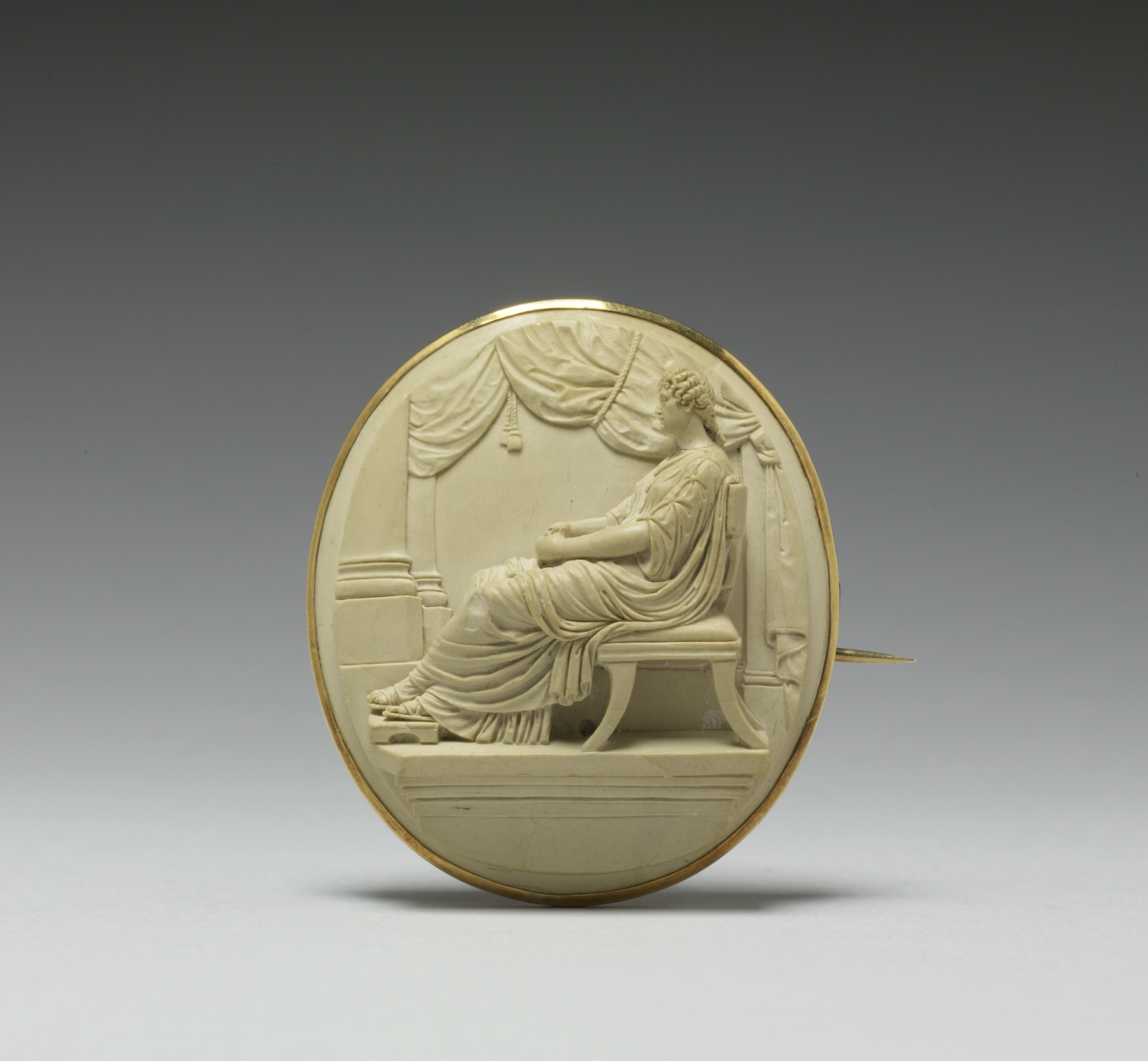
Italian Neoclassical brooch

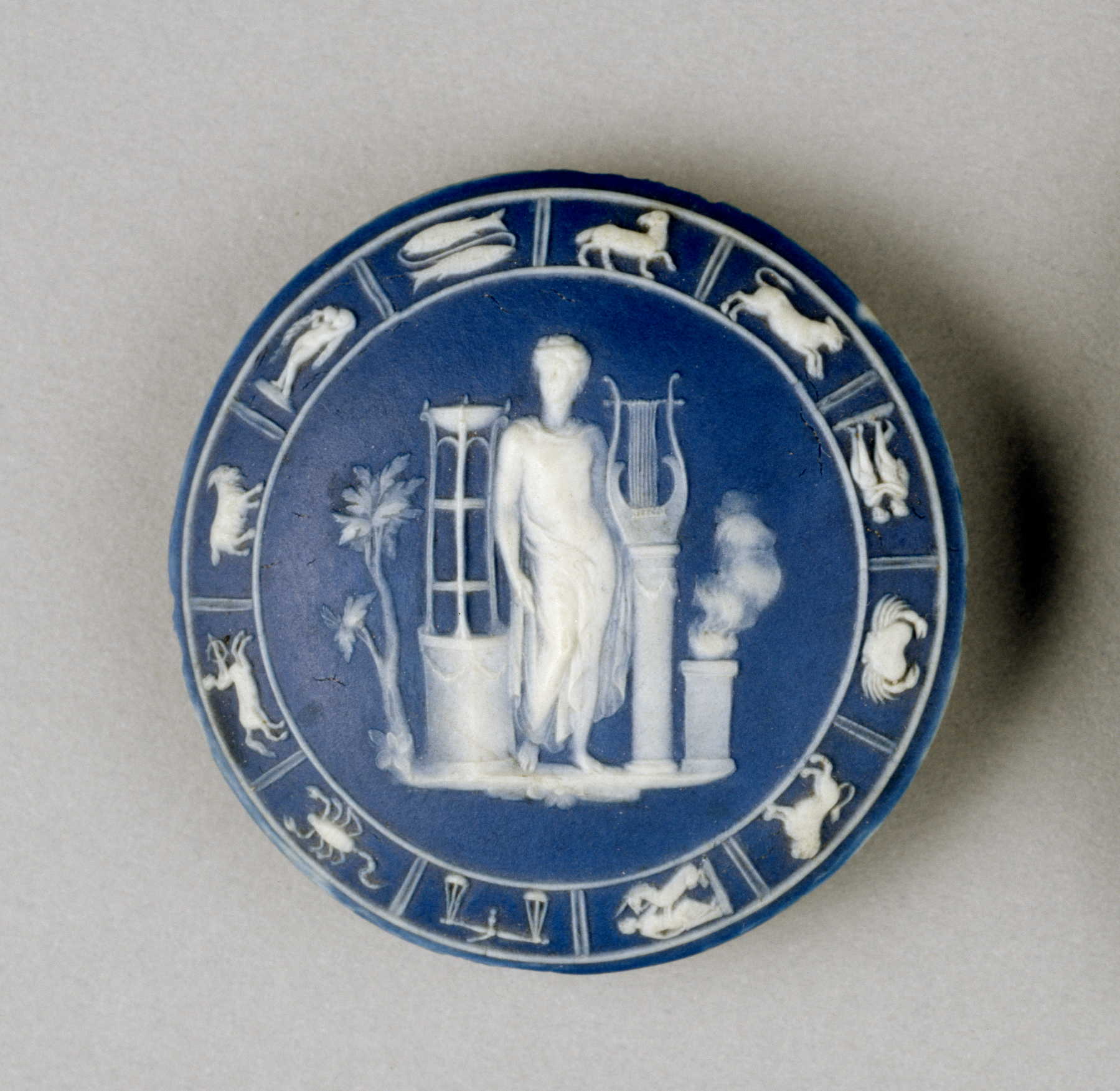
Wedgwood medallion

== Late modern brooches ==
The late modern era of jewellery covers the period from 1830 to 1945. The major jewellery styles of this period are: Victorian (1835–1900), Art Nouveau (1895–1914), Edwardian (1901–1910) and Art deco (1920–1939).

=== Victorian ===
This period was named for Queen Victoria of the United Kingdom, who reigned from 1837 to 1901. Cameos, locket brooches, flowers, nature, animal and hearts were popular jewellery styles in the early Victorian era. When Victoria's husband, Prince Albert, died in 1861, jewellery fashion changed to reflect the queen in mourning. Styles turned heavier and more sombre, using materials like black enamel, jet, and black onyx. Mourning brooches were commonly worn until the end of the Victorian period.

It was fashionable during this period to incorporate hair and portraiture into a brooch. The practice began as an expression of mourning, then expanded to keepsakes of loved ones who were living. Human hair was encased within the brooch or braided and woven into a band to which clasps were affixed.

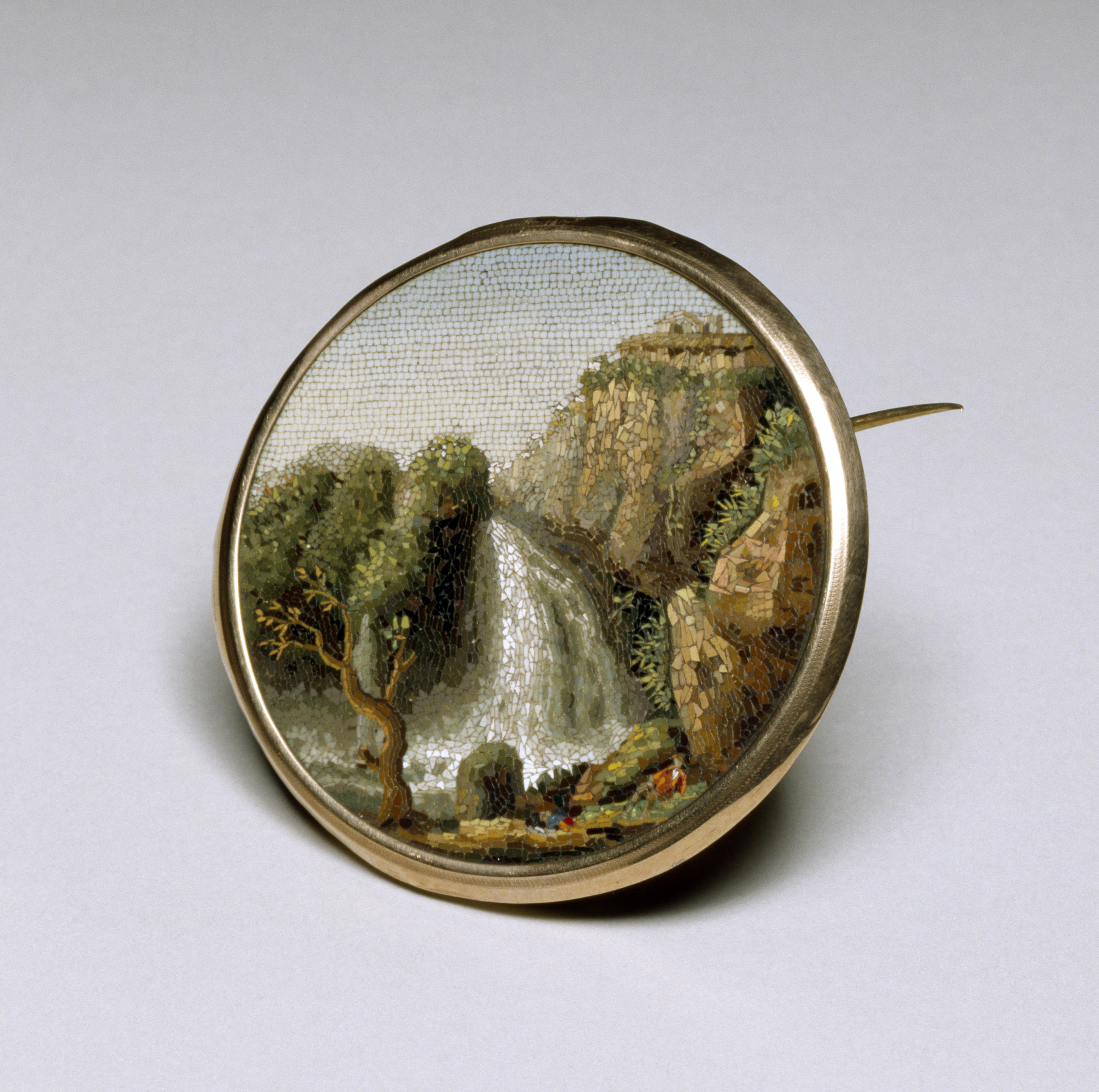
Micromosaic brooch

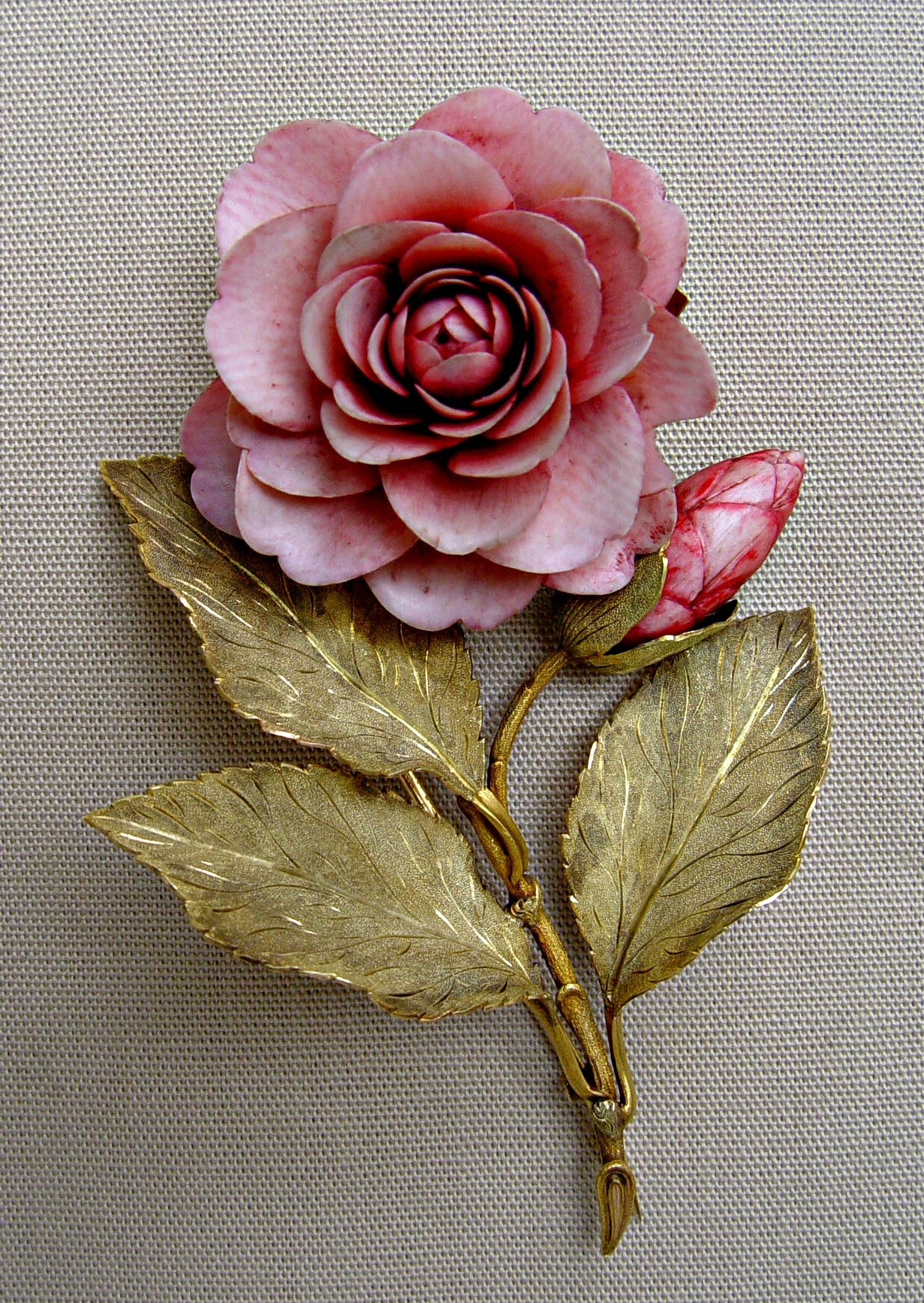
Camelia brooch

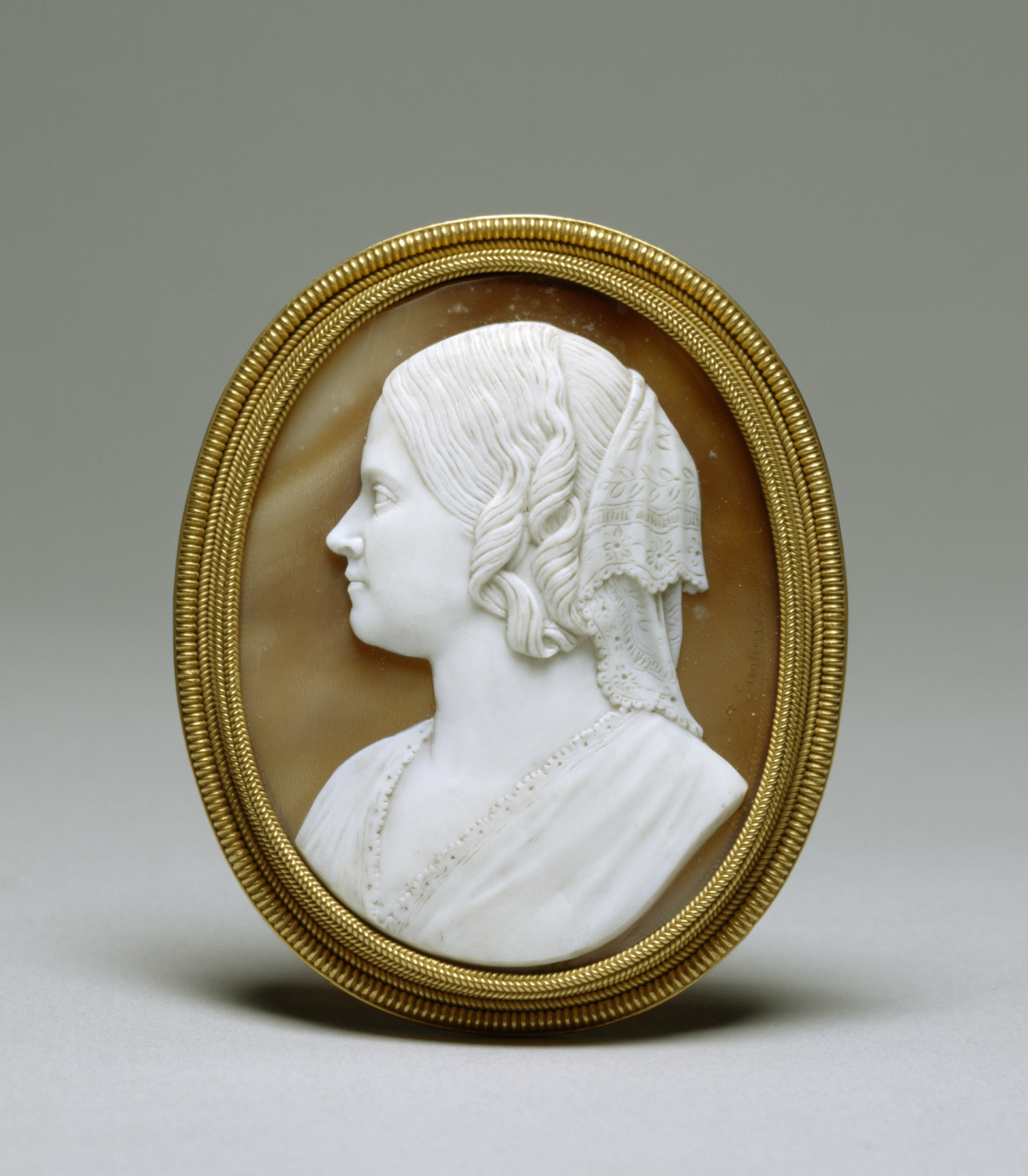
Cameo brooch

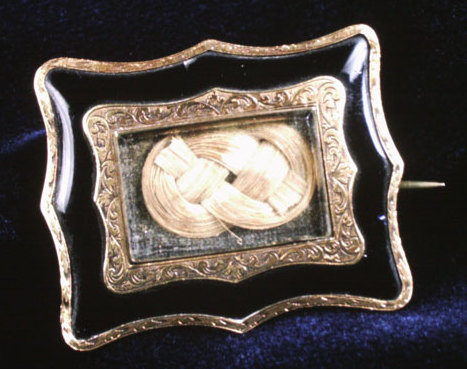
Victorian hair brooch

=== Art Nouveau ===
The Art Nouveau period of jewellery spanned a short period from 1895 to 1905. The style began in France as a reaction to the heavy, sombre jewellery of the Victorian era. Innovative, flowing designs were now in fashion along with nature, flowers, insects and sensuous women with flowing hair. The jewellery style was fashionable for fifteen years, and ended with the beginning of World War I.

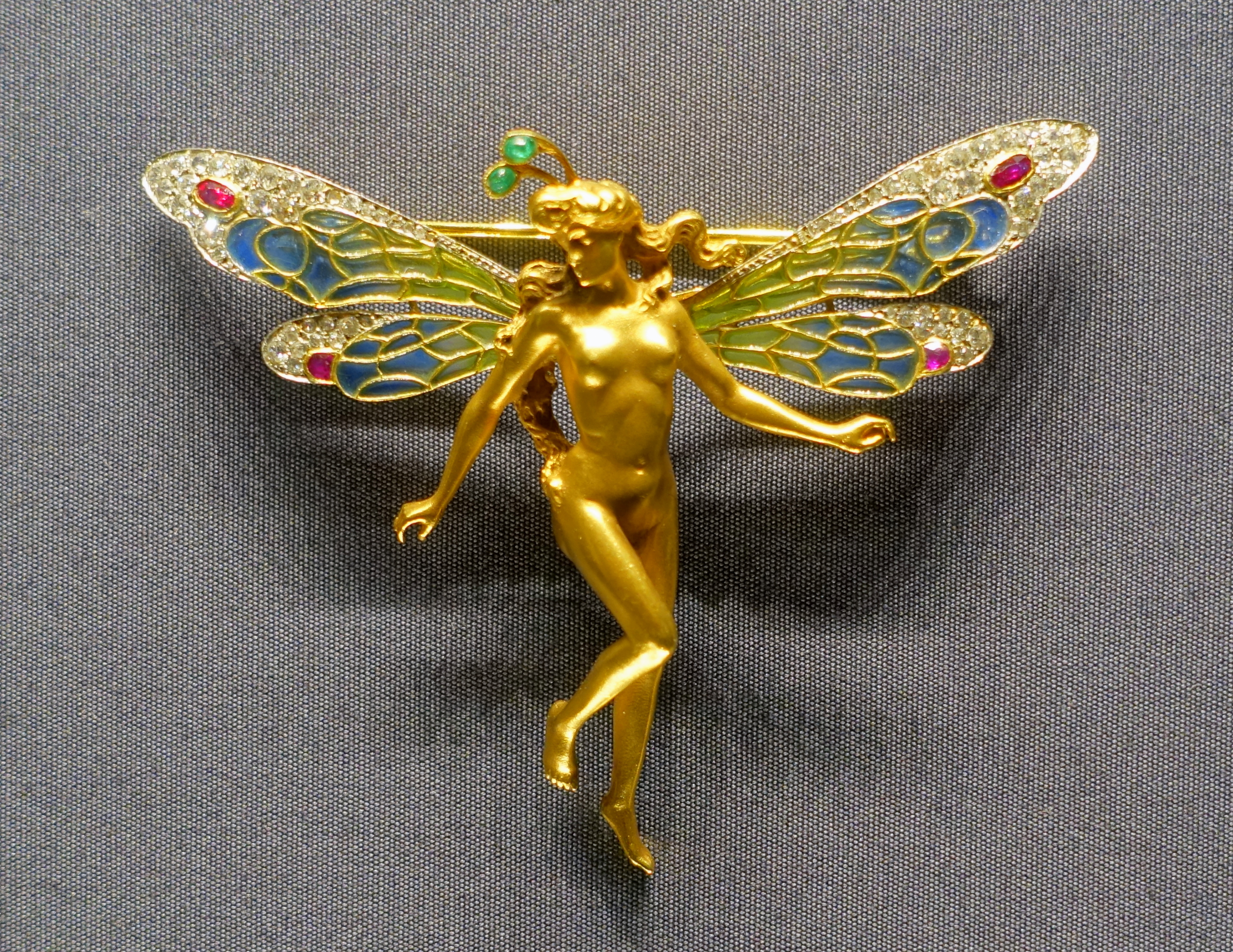
German brooch

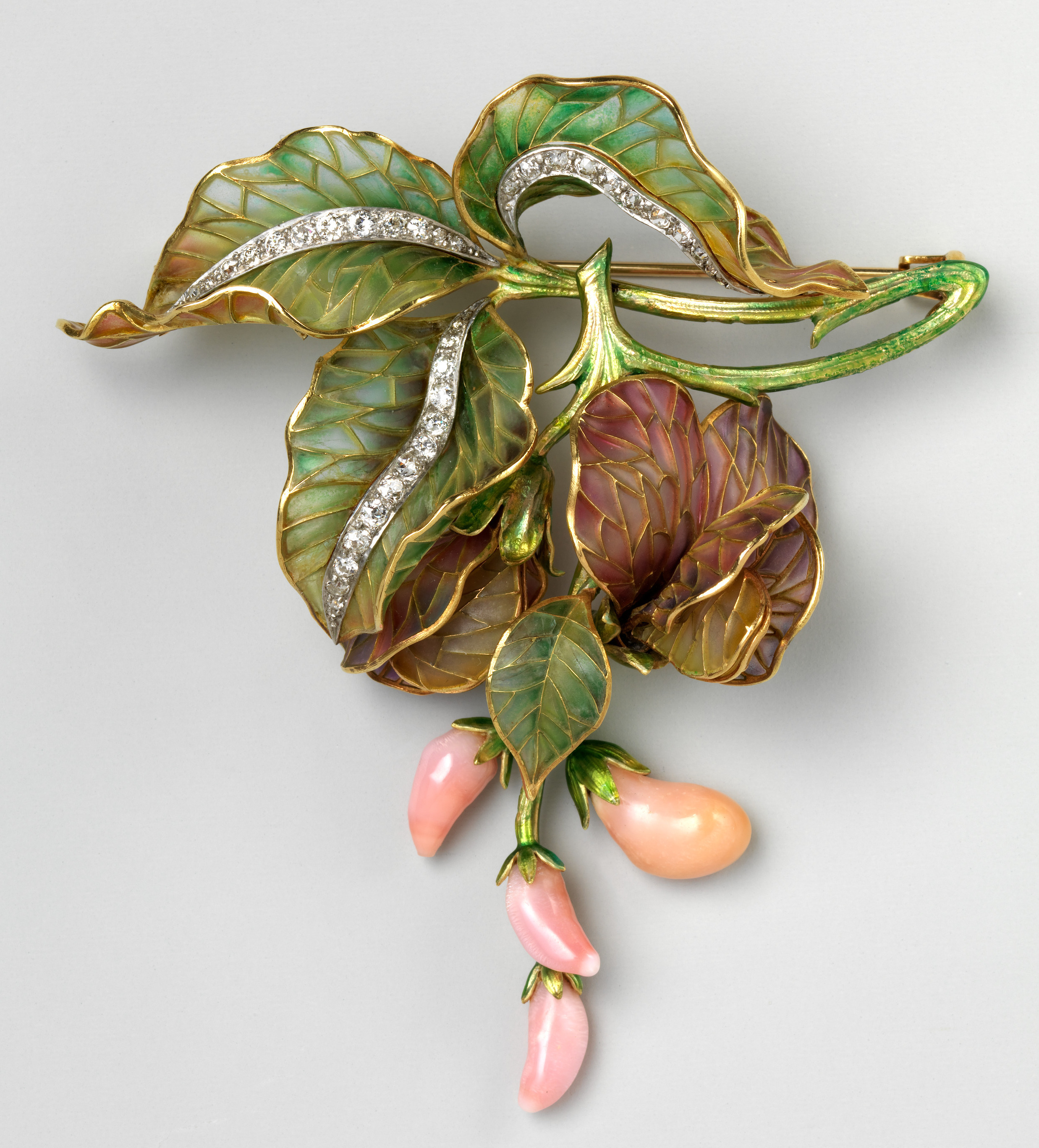
American brooch

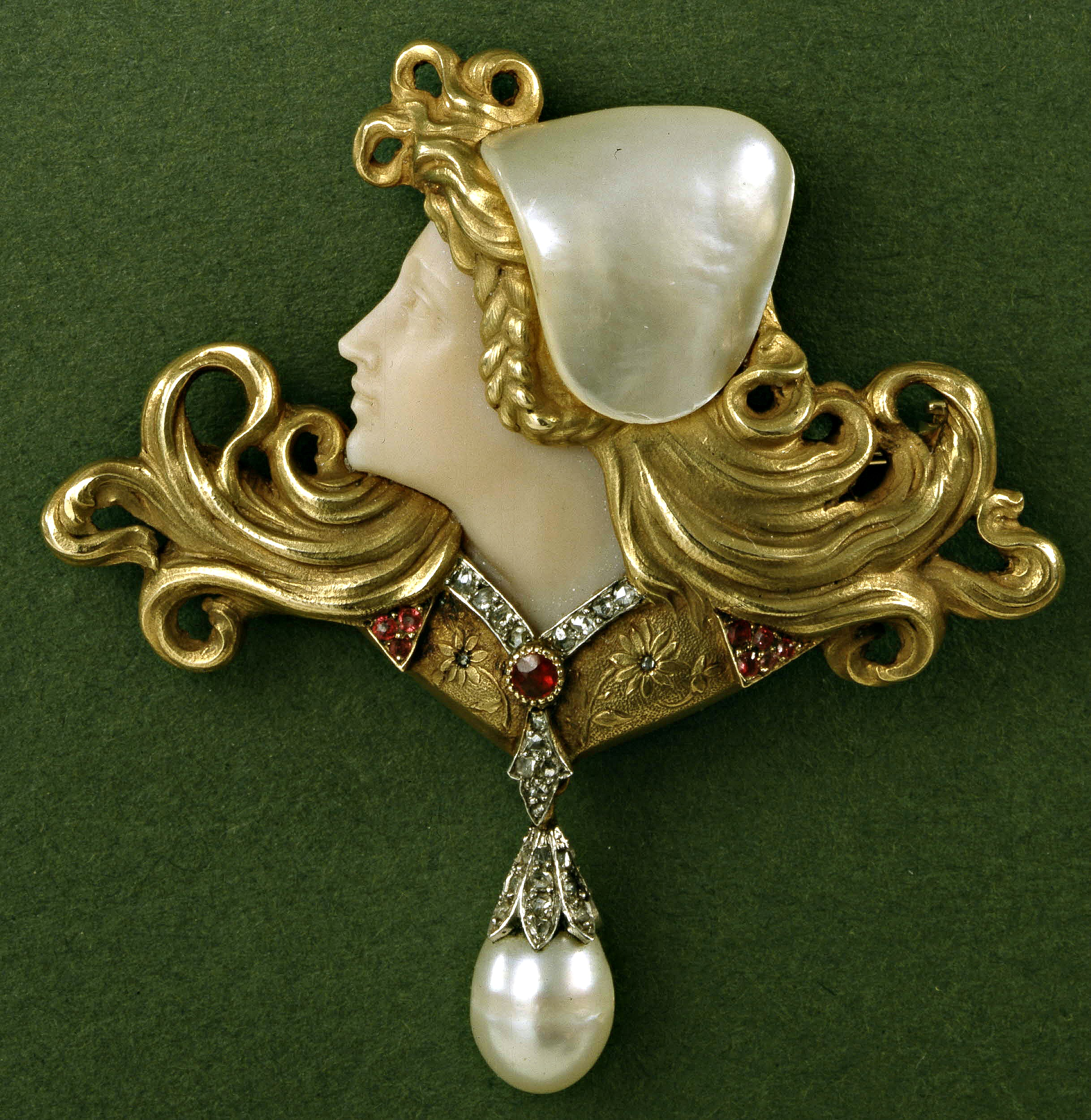
French brooch

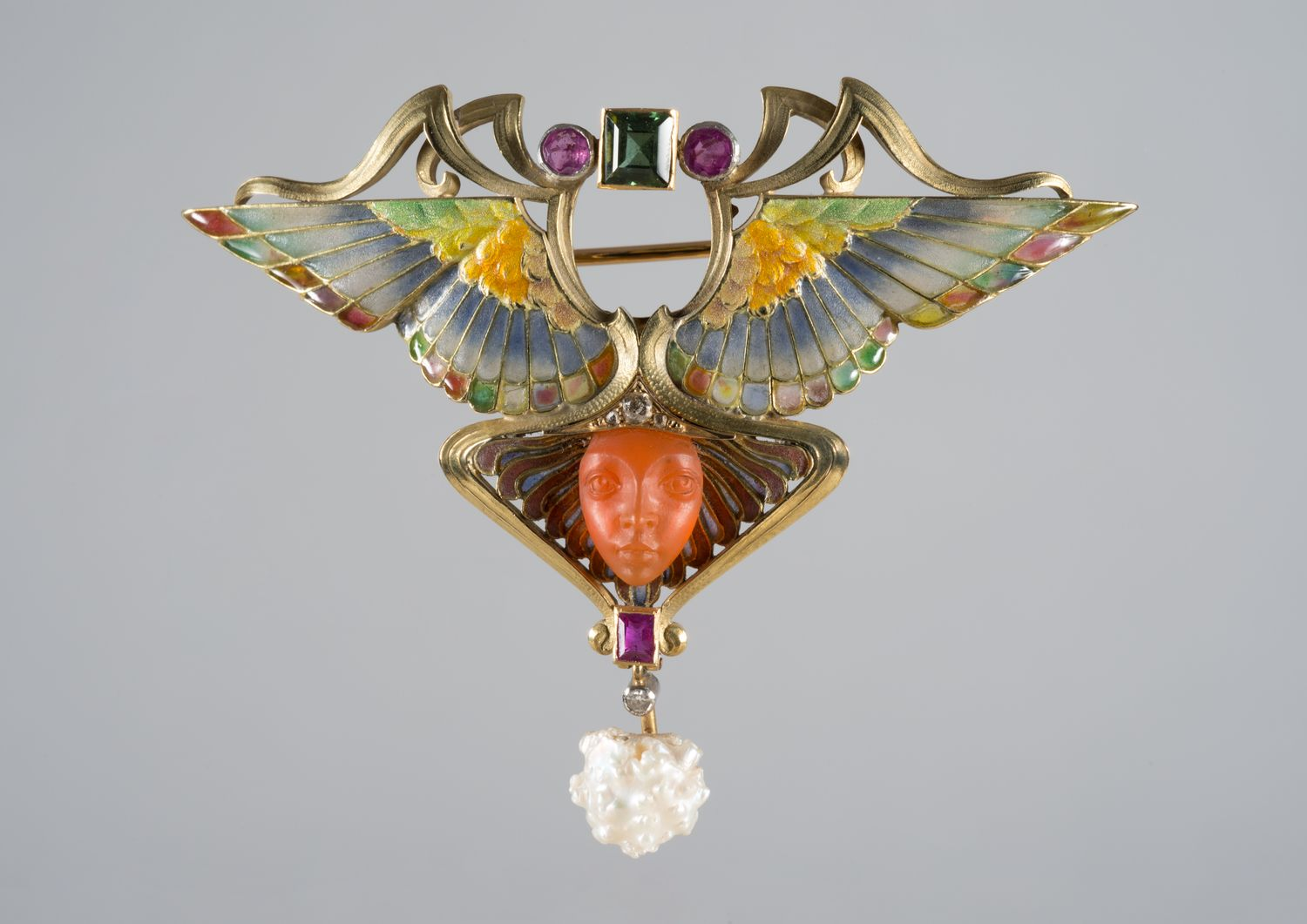
Belgian brooch

=== Edwardian ===
The Edwardian era of jewellery (1901–1910) began after the death of Queen Victoria. This period marked the first time platinum was used in jewellery. Because of platinum's strength, new jewellery pieces were created with delicate filigree to look like lace and silk. The main gemstones used in brooches were diamonds, typically with platinum or white gold, and coloured gemstones or pearls. Platinum and diamond brooches were a common brooch style. Small brooches continued to be fashionable. Popular brooch forms were bows, ribbons, swags, and garlands, all in the delicate new style.

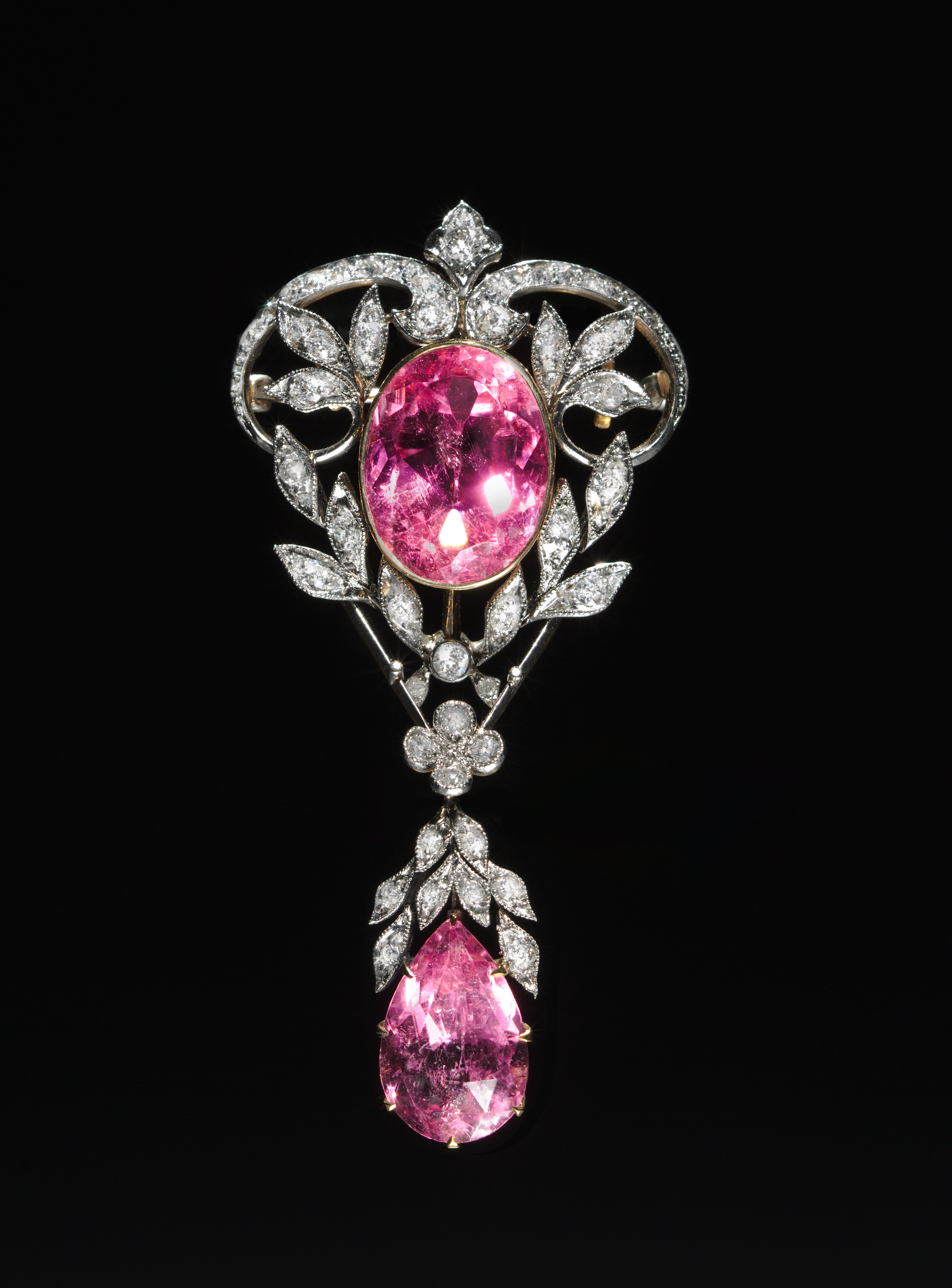
Pendant brooch

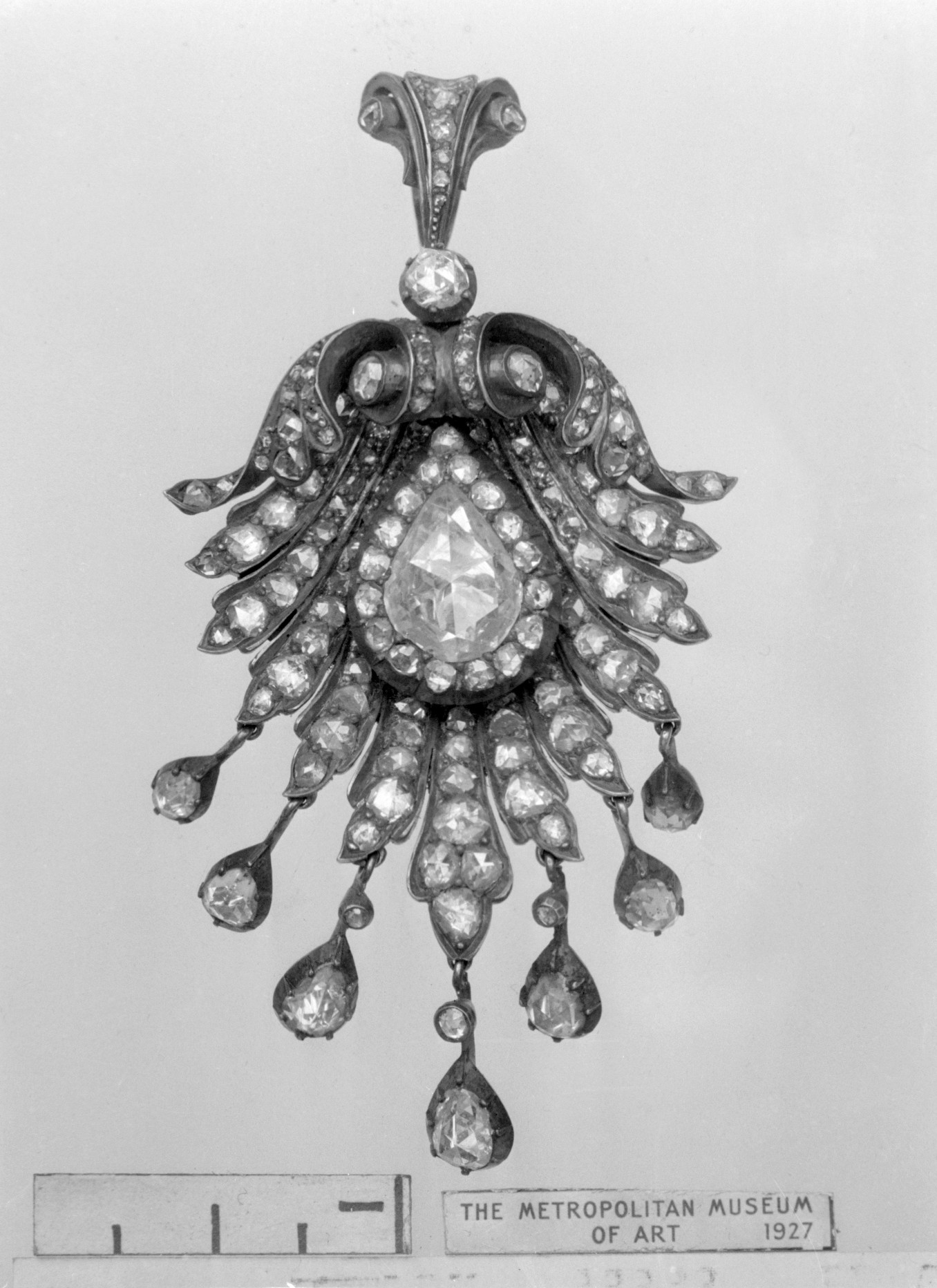
Platinum brooch

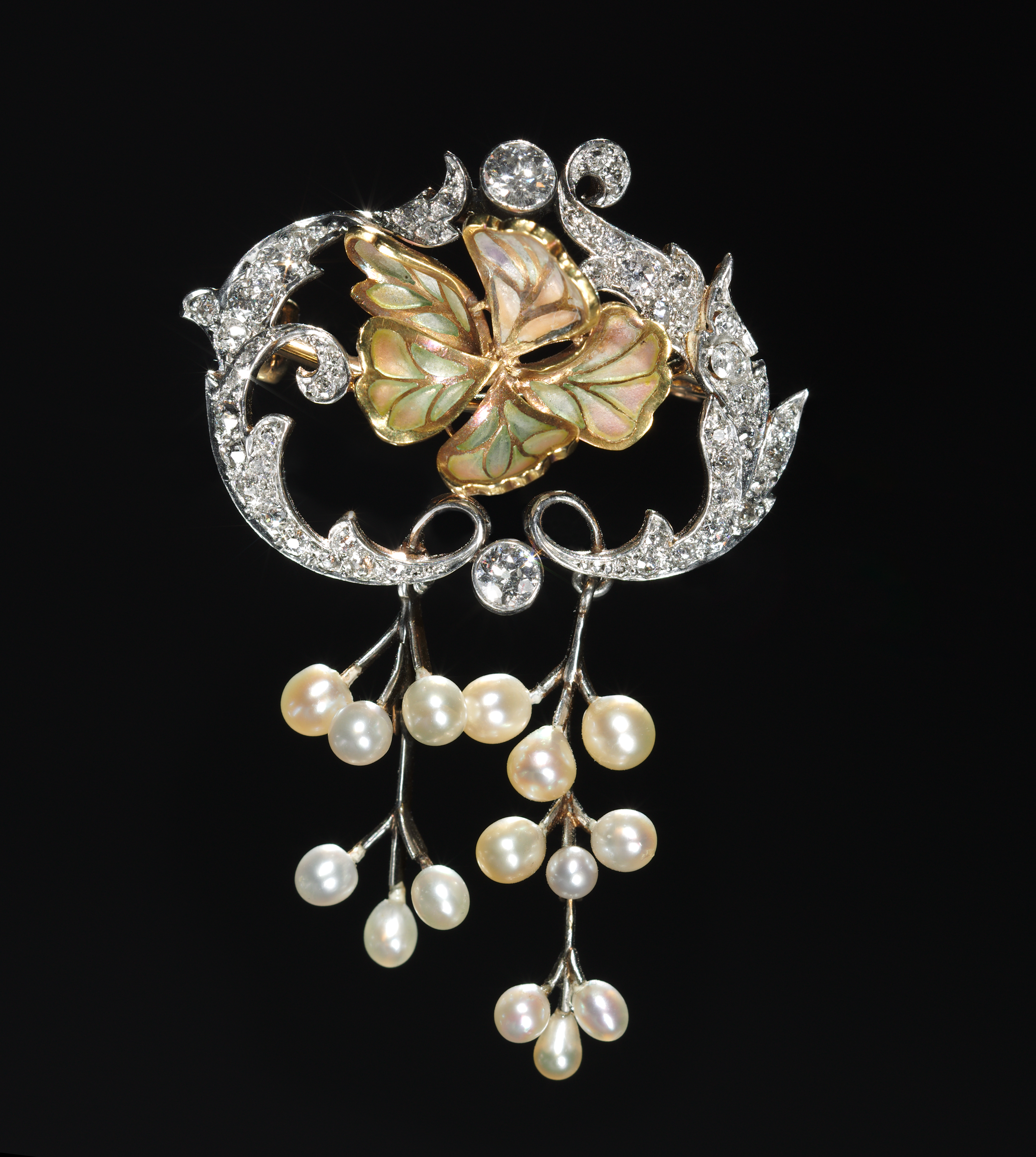
American brooch

=== Art Deco ===
The Art Deco period lasted from 1920 to 1939. Cubism and Fauvism, early 20th century art movements, were inspirations for this new art style, along with Eastern, African and Latin American art. Art Deco was named after the International Exhibition of Modern Decorative and Industrial Arts, a decorative and industrial arts exhibition held in Paris in 1925. Common brooch decoration of this period are: geometric shapes, abstract designs, designs from Cubism, Fauvism, and art motifs from Egypt and India. Black onyx, coral, quartz, lapis and carnelian were used with classic stones such as diamonds, rubies, emeralds, and sapphires.

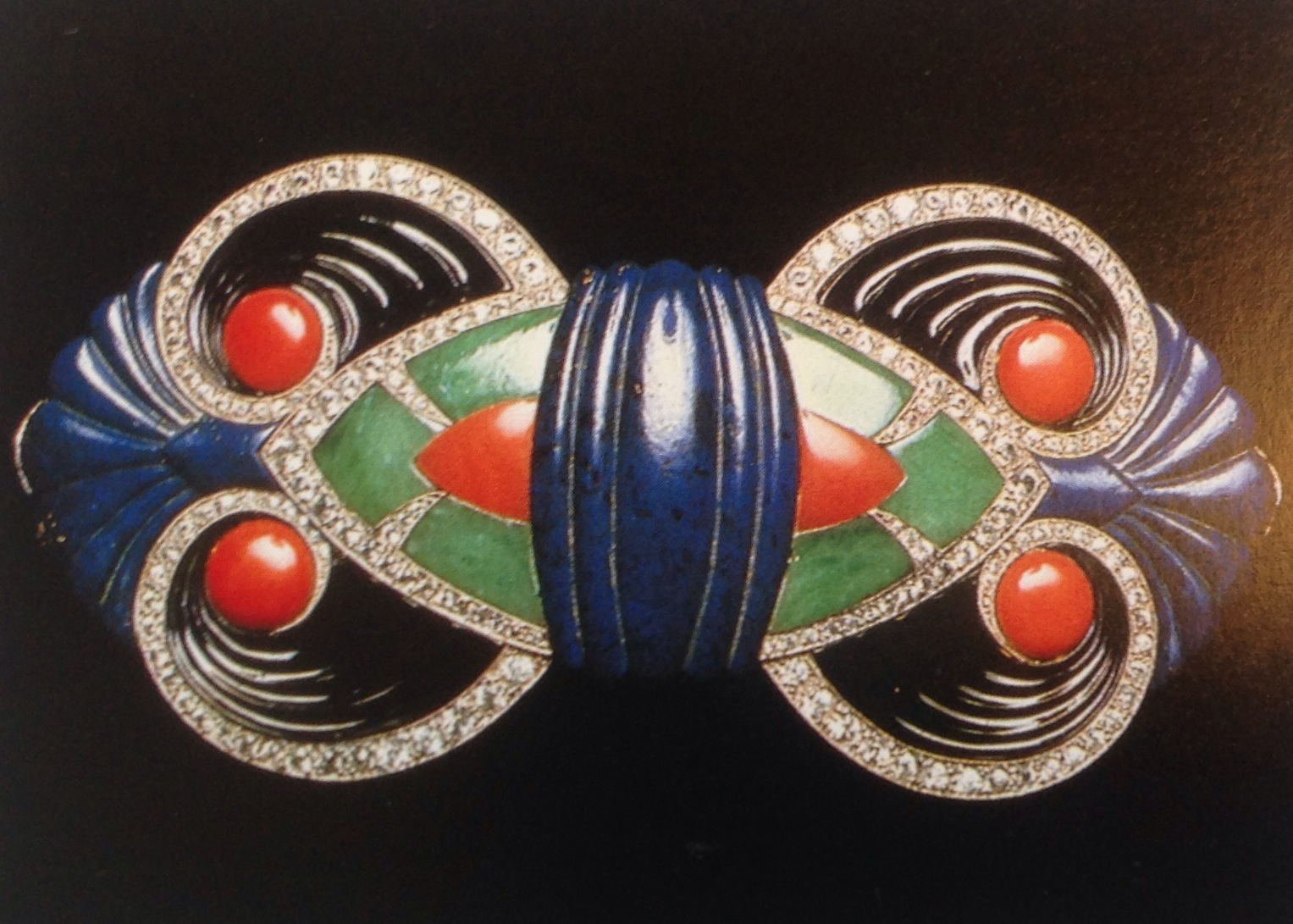
Art deco style

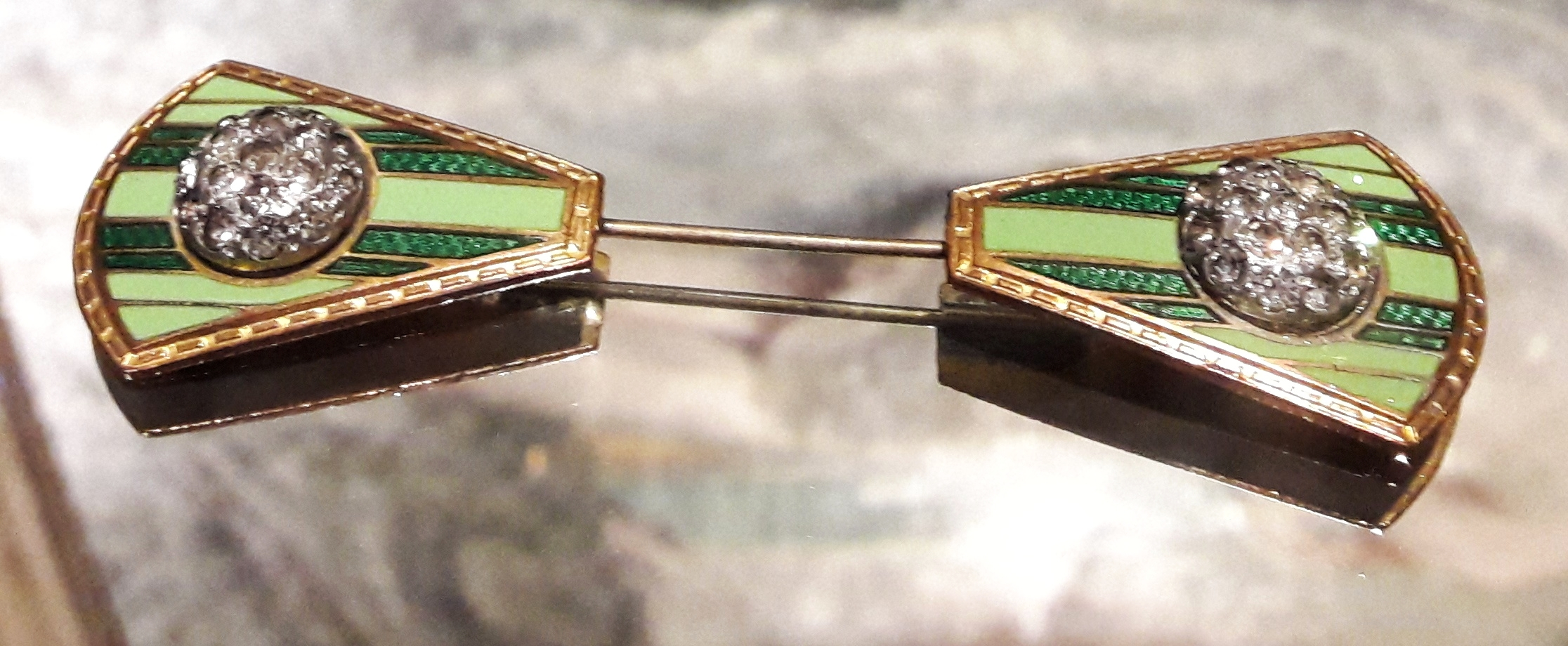
Art deco brooch

== See also ==
- Medieval art
- Anglo-Saxon art
- Migration period art
- Jewellery
- Lapel pin
- Badge
- Pin-back button
