= The Challenge Sverige season 2 =

2nd season of the reality television series

The Challenge Sverige
- Season 2
- Presented by: Ahmed Berhan
- No. of contestants: 20
- Location: Furillen, Sweden

Release
- Original network: TV4
- Original release: 2027

Season chronology
- ← Previous; Season 1

The second season of The Challenge Sverige is expected to premiere on TV4 in 2027 with comedian and presenter Ahmed Berhan as the new host. The season features 20 Swedish reality television participants competing in various challenges for the chance to win SEK 1,000,000.

The season was originally scheduled to premiere in November 2026. However, an incident occurred in October where the edited footage was deleted, requiring the season to be re-edited, thereby delaying the premiere to spring 2027.

== Production ==
The season was filmed in Furillen over a one-month period across May and June 2026. Casting expanded from the previous season to also include contestants from reality programs outside of the TV4 network, such as Paradise Hotel and Love Is Blind: Sweden.

The season had a greater focus on contestant safety during filming, following several incidents during the previous season. Measures implemented included re-evaluating safety conditions from the first season, having challenges safety tested in advance, and allowing contestants psychological support before, during and after filming.

The season was originally scheduled to premiere on 22 November 2026. However, on October 14, 2026, it was reported that an AI agent had deleted all the editing work on the season, requiring the entire season to be re-edited and the season premiere would be delayed until 2027. TV4 confirmed the delay and re-editing which had to be done, but denied the deletion being due to an AI agent, instead stating this was a "technical issue".

== Format ==
The season is set to have contestants competing in four teams, determined based on the reality program they previously appeared on: Farmen (The Farm), Kärlek (Love), Robinson, and Vildingar (Wild Ones).

== Contestants ==
In the lead up to the intended premiere date in November 2026, TV4 had announced half of the contestants competing on the season.

Male contestants	Original season	Finish
Arvid Stenbäcken	Paradise Hotel Sweden 2018	
Emil Renmarker	Love Island Sweden 2023	
Matteo Passero	Robinson: El Nido	
Mattias Helén	Paradise Hotel Sweden 2020	
Simon Lindström	The Bachelor Sweden 2021	
TBA		
TBA		
TBA		
TBA		
TBA		

Female contestants	Original season	Finish
Amanda Teroni	The Farm 2025	
Jennifer Schill	The Farm 2021	
Karina Oliveira	Love Island Sweden 2025	
Nardos Alberto	Big Brother Sweden 2021	
Stephanie Hönig	The Farm 2026	
TBA		
TBA		
TBA		
TBA		
TBA		
