= The Challenge Sverige =

- Genre: Reality competition
- Based on: The Challenge
- Presented by: Pischa Strindstedt; Ahmed Berhan
- Country of origin: Sweden
- No. of seasons: 1
- No. of episodes: 20

Production
- Production company: Mastiff

Original release
- Network: TV4
- Release: August 12, 2024 – present

Related
- The Challenge

The Challenge Sverige (English: The Challenge Sweden) is a Swedish adaptation of the reality-competition series The Challenge. The series features Swedish reality television participants competing in various challenges for the chance to win SEK 1,000,000.

== Production ==
The first season premiered on TV4 on August 12, 2024, with fitness trainer Pischa Strindstedt as host. The season was filmed in Larnaca, Cyprus in 2023.

A second season was originally scheduled to premiere on November 22, 2026, with comedian and presenter Ahmed Berhan as the host. The season was filmed in Furillen, Sweden. Unlike the first season, which solely featured contestants from previous TV4 reality programs, casting expanded to include contestants from other networks' reality series including Paradise Hotel and Love Is Blind: Sweden. On October 14, 2026, it was reported that an AI agent had deleted all the editing work on the season, meaning the entire season has to be re-edited and the season premiere will therefore be delayed until 2027. TV4 confirmed the delay and re-editing which had to be done, but denied the deletion being due to an AI agent, instead stating this was a "technical issue" in which the "backup didn't work".

== Premise ==
Similar to other seasons in The Challenge franchise, the format varies by season, although the competition generally includes contestants participating in challenges and undergoing a nomination process to determine which contestants participate in an elimination round. The winner of the elimination round continues in the competition while the defeated contestants are eliminated. With contestants progressively eliminated during the season, the eventual final contestants/teams compete in the Final Challenge to determine the champions of the season.

The first season had contestants competing in male-female pairs. The second season is set to have contestants competing in four teams: Farmen (The Farm), Kärlek (Love), Robinson, and Vildingar (Wild Ones).

== Episodes ==
Season	Host	Contestants	Format	Original Release	Location	Winner(s)
1	Pischa Strindstedt	24	Pairs	August 12 – October 10, 2024	Larnaca, Cyprus	Jens Rönnqvist & Sandra Cucarano
2	Ahmed Berhan	20	4 teams	Spring 2027	Furillen, Sweden	

=== Season 1 (2024) ===
Season 1
No. overall	No. in season	Title	Original release date
1	1	"Den första utmaningen"	August 12, 2024
2	2	"Inte stöta sig"	August 12, 2024
3	3	"Gladiatorernas ankomst"	August 15, 2024
4	4	"Farmensekten"	August 15, 2024
5	5	"Kärlek och mordhot"	August 19, 2024
6	6	"Den riktiga paktkungen"	August 22, 2024
7	7	"Falla fritt"	August 26, 2024
8	8	"Sparka på den som ligger"	August 29, 2024
9	9	"Svindlande höjder"	September 2, 2024
10	10	"Trauma och tragedi"	September 5, 2024
11	11	"Den ljuva hämnden"	September 9, 2024
12	12	"Krossade hjärtan"	September 12, 2024
13	13	"Fångad i en bur"	September 16, 2024
14	14	"Iskyla och utpressning"	September 19, 2024
15	15	"Ett evigt ältande"	September 23, 2024
16	16	"Otur och svek"	September 26, 2024
17	17	"Pandoras ask"	September 30, 2024
18	18	"Grattis på födelsedagen!"	October 3, 2024
19	19	"Håll andan inför finalen"	October 7, 2024
20	20	"Kampen om miljonen!"	October 10, 2024
