= Petter Pilgaard =

Norwegian television celebrity (born 1980)

- Born: 20 February 1980 (age 46)
- Known for: Winner of Norwegian Paradise Hotel reality television show in 2009

Petter Andre Pilgaard (born 20 February 1980) is a Norwegian television celebrity who gained national fame during the first season of the Norwegian version of Paradise Hotel. He won the competition together with Benedicte Valen, and the two shared the NOK 300,000 (about USD 50,000) prize money.

== Early life ==
Pilgaard who hails from Stabekk in Bærum, Norway, has previously worked as a financial adviser, and since November 2009 he has held a job as co-host on NRJ Radio's morning program.

== Guest appearances in TV shows ==
Later he has been a guest in television entertainment shows such as 4-stjerners middag halv åtte ("4 Star Dinner at Half Past Seven") on TV Norge and Torsdag Kveld fra Nydalen ("Thursday night from Nydalen"), Lurt av Karlsen (a Norwegian version of the American hidden camera show Punk'd) and Trygdekontoret.

== Interest in his income tax listing ==
A testimony to his fame among the Norwegian public came in October 2009 as the Norwegian tax listings were made public online, an annual occurrence which causes a lot of people to check up on the income of their neighbours and also well-known people. "Pilgaard" was the second most queried term, after Norway's wealthiest man, Kjell Inge Røkke, but ahead of the prime minister, Jens Stoltenberg.

== Vocabulary ==
Pilgaard, who hates books, has nevertheless become famous for his use of the Norwegian language in that he has introduced several little known or original terms to a wider audience, such as "skumpa" and "druse". The latter even inspired standup comic Odd-Magnus Williamson to write the song "Vi druser på". Pilgaard's performances during the first season of Paradise Hotel had also been a recurring theme in Williamson's standup routine.

== Personal relationship ==
Pilgaard had initially decided not to associate himself with the series following his involvement in the first season, however, as his girlfriend is the make-up artist for the show's host, Triana Iglesias, he changed his mind and was a co-host the second season, The two became a couple during the summer of 2009 and their romance immediately became a favourite subject of the tabloid media. It even spawned a minor series, Petter elsker Mari (English: Petter loves Mari) on the women-oriented satellite TV channel TV 2 Bliss. The couple knew each other also before Paradise Hotel and reportedly have many common friends.

== Anti-Pilgaard music video ==
In June 2009 three snowboarders from Bærum, Mikkel Bang among them, released a music video mocking the celebrity image of Petter Pilgaard. The video, which was published on the Norwegian snowboarding website tacky.no, features some fairly scornful characterisations of Pilgaard who commented that he had previously been associated with the monoski community in Bærum. The one-time performers and producers of the video stated to the media that they were offered to make the video for free and that there were no ill feelings behind the video. It was simply intended as a humorous stunt.

== See also ==
- Famous for being famous
