= The Challenge: Spies, Lies & Allies =

37th season of the reality television series

Spies, Lies & Allies
- Season 37
- Presented by: T. J. Lavin
- No. of contestants: 36
- Winners: Chris "CT" Tamburello; Kaycee Clark
- Location: Vrsar, Croatia
- No. of episodes: 20 (including the Reunion special)

Release
- Original network: MTV
- Original release: August 11 – December 22, 2021

Season chronology
- ← Previous; Double Agents Next → Ride or Dies

The Challenge: Spies, Lies & Allies is the 37th season of the MTV reality competition series The Challenge. This season features alumni from The Real World, Are You the One?, Big Brother (Nigeria, UK and U.S.), Ex on the Beach (Netherlands), Geordie Shore, Survivor (Romania, Spain, Turkey and U.S.), Shipwrecked, Ultimate Beastmaster, Love Island (Germany, UK and U.S.), Warsaw Shore, Paradise Hotel (Sweden), Too Hot to Handle, 12 Dates of Christmas and The Circle (U.S.) competing for a share at a $1 million prize. The season premiered on August 11, 2021. A launch special titled "The Challenge Spies, Lies and Allies: Global Activation" aired on August 9, 2021. The season aired in 190 different countries, and was the number one unscripted series, for 18-34 year olds, in the 2021–2022 broadcast year.

This season's 12th episode, titled "500", marked the series' 500th episode overall and aired on October 27. This milestone was commemorated by host T. J. Lavin and the remaining cast prior to commencing the episode's challenge.

== Format ==
Spies, Lies & Allies features a main challenge, a nomination process, and an elimination round. This season had players competing in male-female teams of two, with each team initially consisting of an American competitor and an international competitor based on participants' respective home country. Many teams changed throughout the season due to the format of the game.

- Daily Challenge: Players compete in a main challenge in teams of two, where the winning team forms the "Agency" and are immune from elimination.
- Nominations: Players, besides the Agency, participate in nominations and must vote for one team to participate in the elimination round. They are given 20 minutes to discuss the nominations before voting simultaneously and as individuals. The team that receive the most votes are "compromised" and have to compete in the elimination round.
- The Agency: At the Lair, players in the Agency must vote for one male and one female, regardless of whether or not they are a pair, to compete against the compromised team in the elimination round as a pair.
- Eliminations ("The Lair"): The compromised team compete against the two individuals voted in by the Agency in an elimination round. The winning team remains in the game while the losing team is eliminated.

At the start of the episode 10, pairs were disbanded and contestants formed three teams of six during the "Diamond Dash" challenge. The new format from episode 10-17 is as follows:

- Daily Challenge: Players compete in a main challenge in teams (or "cells"), where all members of the winning team form the "Agency" and are immune from elimination.
- Nominations: At nominations, players are given 20 minutes to discuss nominations and plead their case to the Agency. The Agency then individually vote for one player of the designated gender to compete in the elimination round. The player that receives the most votes is "compromised" and has to compete in the elimination round.
- Eliminations ("The Lair"): At the Lair, the compromised player is given the chance to call out any non-immune player as their opponent for the elimination round. The winner remains in the game while the loser is eliminated.

At the start of episode 18, the teams were disbanded for the final two eliminations of the season as part of the "Night of Elimination" twist before the Final Challenge.

Twists

- Infiltration: Two variations of the infiltration twist occurred throughout the season. For most episodes, elimination round winners may select a new team or partner upon winning.
  - In episodes 1-8, the winners of the elimination round may choose to remain as a team, or they can "infiltrate" and select any non-immune player of the opposite gender in an existing team (regardless of their home country) as their new partner. In the event that players in an existing pair are chosen, their two former partners and the two former partners of the elimination winners also form two respective new teams.
  - From episodes 10-16, the winner of the elimination round may choose to remain on their current team or infiltrate and join either of the remaining two teams. If they elect to infiltrate, they must select a player from their desired team to swap positions with.
- Night of Elimination: Immediately following the "Rocket Run" elimination, teams were disbanded and players had to vote one male and one female player to compete in the Lair. All players, including the previous Agency, were eligible to receive votes. The male and female player with the most votes then had to call out an opponent of the same gender for an instant elimination.

== Contestants ==
Male contestants	Original season	Finish
Chris "CT" Tamburello	The Real World: Paris	Winner
Kyle Christie	Geordie Shore 8	Runner-up
Devin Walker-Molaghan	Are You the One? 3	Third place
Nelson Thomas	Are You the One? 3	Fourth place
Emanuel Neagu	Survivor România 1	Episode 18
Logan Sampedro	Survivor Spain 13	Episode 17
Josh Martinez	Big Brother 19	Episode 15
Cory Wharton	Real World: Ex-Plosion	Episode 13
Ed Eason (Note: Following the "Back Me Up" elimination, it was announced that Nam had left the game. His departure was not shown on screen nor did he vote at nominations. Ed joined the competition as a replacement for Nam.)	The Circle US 1	Episode 11
Jeremiah White	Love Island USA 2	Episode 9
Hughie Maughan	Big Brother UK 17	Episode 8
Faysal "Fessy" Shafaat	Big Brother 20	Episode 7 (Note: Prior to nominations, Fessy was disqualified from the competition following a physical altercation with Josh during the previous night. Due to uneven numbers, the "Rage Cage" elimination was played as an individual female elimination round.)
Gabo Szabó	Warsaw Shore 12	Episode 5
Corey Lay	12 Dates of Christmas 1	Episode 4
Tommy Sheehan	Survivor: Island of the Idols	Episode 3 (Note: Tommy was medically removed from the competition after suffering a concussion during the "Sea Cave Recon" challenge. Due to uneven numbers, the "Slipping Up" elimination was played as an individual female elimination round.)
Kelz Dyke	Too Hot to Handle 1	Episode 2
Renan Hellemans	Ex on the Beach: Double Dutch 4	Episode 1
Nam Vo	Ultimate Beastmaster 1	Episode 1

Female contestants	Original season	Finish
Kaycee Clark	Big Brother 20	Winner
Tori Deal	Are You the One? 4	Runner-up
Emy Alupei	Survivor România 1	Third place
Nany Gonzalez	The Real World: Las Vegas (2011)	Fourth place
Amanda Garcia	Are You the One? 3	Episode 18
Tula "Big T" Fazakerley (Note: After losing "Vault Escape" elimination, Big T immediately returned to the competition due to uneven numbers following Ashley's removal from the competition, remaining on the Ruby Cell.)	Shipwrecked: Battle of the Islands	Episode 16
Ashley Mitchell	Real World: Ex-Plosion	Episode 14 (Note: Prior to the "Vault Escape" elimination, it was announced that Ashley was removed from the competition for breaking the rules. Her departure was not shown on-screen, nor did she vote at nominations.)
Bettina Buchanan	Paradise Hotel Sweden 8	Episode 12
Priscilla Anyabu	Love Island UK 6	Episode 10
Amber Borzotra (Note: Lauren left or was removed from the competition prior to the "Heli Heist" challenge; her departure was not shown on-screen. Amber joined the competition as a replacement for Lauren.)	Big Brother 16	Episode 9
Berna Canbeldek	Survivor Turkey 8	Episode 8
Esther Agunbiade	Big Brother Nigeria 4	Episode 7
Aneesa Ferreira	The Real World: Chicago	Episode 5 (Note: Aneesa was medically removed from the competition after suffering a shoulder injury during the "Mindfield" challenge. Due to uneven numbers, the "Higher Assets" elimination was played as an individual male elimination round.)
Michele Fitzgerald	Survivor: Kaôh Rōng	Episode 4
Natacha "Tacha" Akide	Big Brother Nigeria 4	Episode 3
Tracy Candela	Love Island Germany 2	Episode 2
Lauren Coogan	Love Island USA 2	Episode 2
Michaela Bradshaw	Survivor: Millennials vs. Gen X	Episode 1

== Gameplay ==
=== Challenge games ===
- Compromised: Each American contestant begins chained to a stack of cinder blocks. To determine the initial teams, each international contestant must race down a path to reach the American contestants, collecting a sledgehammer and key along the way. Once there, they must unlock an available American contestant they wish to partner with before using the sledgehammer to break through the cinder blocks and release a safe. Newly-formed teams must then take the safe to a decoding station and open it to collect a gemstone before crossing the finish line. The first team to cross the finish line wins.
  - Winners: Aneesa & Logan
- Heli Heist: Played two teams at a time. One team member begins in a speeding car while their partner begins in an overhead helicopter. The team member in the helicopter must throw bags of gems to their partner, who must catch them through the car’s sunroof. Once the car reaches the end of the runway, they must exit the car and cross the finish line. The team that catches the most bags the fastest wins.
  - Winners: Esther & Fessy
- Sea Cave Recon: Played two teams at a time, teams dive off a 30-foot (9.1 m) cliff to collect their first "bomb" capsule in the water below. They must then swim through a sea cave to collect a second bomb, proceed to a WaveRunner, and hold onto the attached bodyboard until they are pulled to a buoy. From the buoy, they must swim to shore and place the bombs on a podium. The team with the fastest time wins.
  - Winners: Ed & Tori
- Undercover Comms: Played in two heats of seven teams, one team member begins suspended underneath a platform. They must pull themselves to three codes and describe them to their partner via walkie-talkie. Their partner must search through rubble for the matching codes and use the corresponding numbers to unlock a box containing a detonator, which they may use to eliminate another team from the challenge. The first team to collect three detonators, or the last team standing, wins their heat. However, the team to achieve this the fastest wins and becomes the Agency.
  - Winners: Esther & Fessy
- Mindfield: Each team member must complete three cumulative obstacles to acquire puzzle pieces, and return to deposit their puzzle piece after each obstacle. At the first obstacle, players must crawl under a net to reach their first puzzle piece. At the second obstacle, players must scale a climbing wall to reach their second puzzle piece. At the third obstacle, players must pull a tyre past a marked line and solve the attached math problem to unlock a safe containing their third puzzle piece. After collecting all six puzzle pieces, the first team to solve the puzzle wins.
  - Winners: Berna & CT
- Turning Agents: Played two teams at a time, teams begin strapped to the roof of a car. As the cars perform doughnuts, they must find their colored symbols printed on a nearby tank and use the corresponding numbers to unlock a lockbox before detonating a smoke bomb. The team with the fastest time wins.
  - Winners: Emanuel & Kaycee
- Dive Bomb: Played in three heats, teams ride a sea scooter to collect two underwater ropes with puzzle pieces attached. They must then grab a key tied to a nearby yacht and use it to open a chest with their remaining puzzle pieces. Once they collect all 16 puzzle pieces, teams must solve the puzzle and detonate their station. The team with the fastest time wins.
  - Winners: CT & Emy
- Bombshell Battle: Played in three rounds, teams must retrieve four of their colored "bombs" from the center of a mud pit and return them to their station, alternating team members each time. Once they collect all four bombs, they must retrieve a silver bomb to advance to the next round while the number of silver bombs decrease each round. The team that retrieves the sole silver bomb in the final round wins.
  - Winners: Logan & Nany
- Diamond Dash: For the first stage, players race to collect a sledgehammer before proceeding to the end of the trail. Upon arrival, they can select one of three assignments to complete: (1) using binoculars to view their code on a sign, (2) finding a box that fits into slots of a wall and scaling the wall to reach their code, or (3) scratching paint off a board to reveal their code. Players must then use the code to unlock a safe, collect a diamond, and place it in either the Emerald, Ruby or Sapphire station – each of which holds six players. It was then revealed that this would be the teams (or "cells") that players would compete in. For the second stage, newly-formed teams must use their sledgehammers to break cinder blocks and place the rubble in one end of a structure. Once they place enough rubble, the structure would balance out to release a diamond. The first team to cross the finish line with their diamond wins.
  - Winners: Emerald Cell
- Satellite Sabotage: Teams begin on a "satellite" suspended above water. One team member at a time must jump across the satellite's spokes before leaping off the final spoke to unplug a plug. Meanwhile, the remaining teams attempt to stop them by spraying them with a fire hose. Players are disqualified if they fall off the spokes, or fail to jump when pulling out the plugs. The team that gets the most players the furthest, the fastest, wins. In addition to becoming the Agency, each member of the winning team also received a cash prize of $3,000 each.
  - Winners: Emerald Cell
- Brush Contact: Played in three rounds, with one team playing offense and one team playing defense each round. The male team members of the offense team begin at one end of a field and must transfer as many bags, worth varying denominations, to a safe zone in the middle of the field. The female team members must then transfer the bags from the safe zone to the end zone at the end of the field. Meanwhile, the team playing defense attempt to stop them by stealing the bags and bringing them out of bounds. The team that transfers the most money to the end zone wins.
  - Winners: Emerald Cell
- Sunken Intelligence: Teams must untie a 150-foot (46 m) rope tied around a sunken shipwreck. They must then attach the rope to a chest, pull the chest to shore and place the diamond inside on a podium. The team with the fastest time wins.
  - Winners: Emerald Cell
- Submerged: Inspired by scenes from the then-upcoming film Top Gun: Maverick. Teams begin in an aircraft suspended above water. As the aircraft drops into the water and begins to submerge, teams must exit the aircraft and collect 25 tiles attached to the outside. They must then dive under the wing of the aircraft to view an answer key, swim to shore and replicate the key by placing the tiles on an answer board. There is a 45-minute time limit before teams time-out. The team with the fastest time wins.
  - Winners: Sapphire Cell
- Boom Raiders: Each team begins at their bunker at different ends of a narrow intersecting trench - each bunker has 10 sticks of dynamite in their detonator. One team member at a time must run through the trench to an opposing team's bunker, collect one stick of their dynamite and return it to their detonator before the next team member goes. The first team to accumulate 20 sticks of dynamite and detonate their opponent's bunkers wins.
  - Winners: Sapphire Cell
- Million Dollar Heist: Each team is given two duffel bags to transfer $1 million worth of banknotes, weighing over 2,000 pounds (910 kg) in total, from their team vault to an SUV at the end of a path. The first team to transfer all of their banknotes wins.
  - Winners: Emerald Cell
- Dead Drop: Teams begin on a platform suspended above water. One team member at a time must cross a beam and collect one of their team's ten capsules at the opposite end before returning it to their team's chest. Meanwhile, members from both opposing teams attempt to knock them off by swinging "bombs" at them from a nearby platform. If a player gets knocked off the beam while holding a capsule, the capsule is considered out of play. The team that collects the most capsules the fastest wins.
  - Winners: Sapphire Cell

=== Lair games ===
- Back Me Up: Both teams begin strapped together by their backs in the center of a platform. The first team to drag or push their opponents down their respective ramp of the platform wins.
  - Played by: Corey L. & Michele vs. Michaela & Renan
- Flipping Agents: One team member begins strapped to a cage. Their partner must flip the cage back and forth so they can collect 12 cubic puzzle pieces using a magnet attached to a rope. Once they collect all 12 puzzle pieces, teams must solve the puzzle to reveal a world map. The first team to solve the puzzle wins.
  - Played by: Ed & Emy vs. Kelz & Tracy
- Slipping Up: Players must place each of their provided poles on pegs of a metal frame to form a ladder. They must then climb the ladder and ring the bell at the top. The first player to ring their bell wins.
  - Played by: Berna vs. Tacha
- Down to the Wire: Each team begins handcuffed to a pole attached to an obstacle course. They must maneuver the pole through the course to collect a key before returning to the start and unlocking themselves. The first team to unlock themselves and pull the lever wins.
  - Played by: Amber & Hughie vs. Corey L. & Michele
- Higher Assets: Players must climb a 20-foot (6.1 m) rope to reach an answer key. They must memorise the answer key before returning down to replicate the key by placing tiles on a memory board. The first player to correctly replicate the answer key wins.
  - Played by: Gabo vs. Logan
- Rage Cage: Players must run through a narrow hallway, past their opponent and climb up the end of the hall to ring a bell. The first player to ring their bell twice wins.
  - Played by: Emy vs. Esther
- Race to Escape: Teams begin tied together by their wrists, facing back-to-back. They must release themselves by climbing up a 30-foot (9.1 m) pole to reach a blade and cutting the ropes that bind them together. The first team to cut both of their ropes wins.
  - Played by: Berna & Hughie vs. Jeremiah & Priscilla
- Hang in the Balance: Teams begin harnessed on a platform and must transfer all of their puzzle pieces across an angled balance beam to their puzzle station, with both team members crossing simultaneously. Teams must return to the start of the beam if they fall off. Once they transfer all their puzzle pieces, the first team to assemble the vertical puzzle wins.
  - Played by: Amber & Jeremiah vs. Bettina & Cory
- Seek and Destroy: Players must search through piles of sand to find eight colored tyres. They must then memorise a sequence of flashing colored lights and replicate the sequence by placing the tyres around a pole. The first player to correctly replicate the sequence wins.
  - Played by: Ashley vs. Priscilla
- Pole Wrestle: Players begin at the center of the Lair with both hands on a metal pole. The first player to wrestle the pole out of their opponent's hands twice wins.
  - Played by: Ed vs. Kyle
- Bombs Away: Players must use a rope to swing an overhead missile at five targets. The first player to hit all five targets wins.
  - Played by: Bettina vs. Emy
- Rope Burn: Players begin on a spherical cage across from their opponent, with an ignited rope in between them. They must pull their opponent off the cage, or pull the rope out of their opponent's hands to earn a point. The first player to score two points wins.
  - Played by: Cory vs. Logan
- Vault Escape: Players must pull out cylindrical locks from a 20-foot (6.1 m) vault by rotating the lock so that it fits through a narrow hole. They must then climb onto the lock and pull out the next lock, continuing this process for all eight locks. The first player to pull out all eight locks and ring the bell at the top of the vault wins.
  - Played by: Amanda vs. Big T
- Burning Bridges: Players must jump off a platform and ring a hanging bell before collecting a plank. They must then climb back on the platform and place the plank on the frame of a bridge, repeating this process for all 16 planks. If they miss the bell, they must climb and jump again. The first player to place all 16 planks on their bridge and pull the lever at the end wins.
  - Played by: Josh vs. Kyle
- License to Chill: Players swim through an icy pool and ring a bell at the end before exiting the pool and solving a geometric puzzle. Periodically, host T.J. Lavin would sound an airhorn meaning players must re-enter the pool and ring the bell again before they can continue solving the puzzle. The first player to solve the puzzle wins.
  - Played by: Big T vs. Emy
- Rocket Run: Players have 15 seconds to run across the Lair, jumping over a rocket along the way, and pull a lever at the end before returning to the start. Players repeat this process until one player is unable to complete this within the allotted time. After an extended period, the time-limit is reduced to 10 seconds. The last player standing wins.
  - Played by: Emanuel vs. Logan
- Drone Drop: Players begin at a podium on opposite ends of the Lair. A drone will drop a football-shaped "package" into the center of the Lair, which players must retrieve and place on their podium to score a point. The first player to score two points wins.
  - Played by: Amanda vs. Tori
- Triple Threat: Each player has three puzzles which they must solve in order. The first player to solve all three puzzles wins.
  - Played by: Devin vs. Emanuel

=== Final Challenge ===
Day one

Contestants began the Final Challenge as individuals for the first three checkpoints, competed as two teams for the next four checkpoints and finished as pairs. The winning pair were awarded the decision of how much, if any, of the $1 million prize money to award the remaining finalists and how much money to keep for themselves.

- Checkpoint #1: Players must assemble a puzzle of a world map before placing ten national flag icons on their respective country. Players then race to board one of four helicopters which fly them to a drop zone above a lake. Each helicopter holds two players and depart in the order that they completed the puzzle.
- Checkpoint #2: Players jump from the helicopter into the lake, swim towards a sea scooter and ride it to shore. Along the way, they must also collect a puzzle piece tied to a buoy. After reaching the shore, players then run down a rocky and undulating path to the next checkpoint.
- Checkpoint #3: Players arrive at a puzzle station to find 15 puzzle pieces in addition to the piece they collected during the previous checkpoint. They must use the 16 pieces to solve a puzzle before proceeding down a trail. Upon completion, players could then choose to join either the Orange or Purple Cell, each of which hold two male and two female players. Players then compete in these teams until further notice.
- Checkpoint #4: Teams unravel ropes and chains to release a cage and collect the safe inside. They must then dive into a lake and memorize a code submerged underwater before transporting their safe up a mountain. There, teams must find nearby signs and decode the code they memorised to unlock the safe, retrieve the key inside and proceed to the next checkpoint.
- Checkpoint #5: Teams use their key from the previous checkpoint to unlock a large cylindrical "missile" and carry it up a winding path to a puzzle. There, they must combine their missile with 11 other missiles to form a matchstick puzzle which they must solve before proceeding to the next checkpoint.
- Checkpoint #6 and Overnight Stage: Teams must roll a large metal sphere containing supplies for the Overnight Stage down a path towards a cave. The first team to reach the cave are safe while the four members of the losing team must compete in an Instant Elimination the following day. Teams then spend the night in the cave with the provided supplies.
  - Winners: Purple Cell

Day two

- Checkpoint #7 - Instant Elimination ("Back Me Up"): Players from the losing team compete against their teammate of the same gender in an Instant Elimination. In a revisit of the season’s first elimination, players begin strapped together by their backs in the center of a platform. The first player to drag or push their opponent down their respective ramp of the platform twice wins while the losers are eliminated.
  - Played by: Kyle vs. Nelson, Kaycee vs. Nany
  - Eliminated: Nelson (4th place), Nany (4th place)
- Final leg: Teams are disbanded and contestants complete the Final Leg in male-female pairs. The winners of the instant elimination are rewarded with the ability to select any player of the opposite gender as their partner. The remaining two unselected players form the final pair. Pairs must race to the top of a mountain to find and memorize a 20-digit code. They must then proceed to a safe, enter the code to unlock the safe and retrieve the black diamond inside. The first pair to open their safe are declared the winners of Spies, Lies & Allies and are granted the decision of how much, if any, of the $1 million prize money to award the remaining finalists and how much money to keep for themselves.
  - Winners: CT & Kaycee – $800,000 retained ($400,000 each)
  - Runners-up: Kyle & Tori – $100,000 awarded ($50,000 each)
  - Third place: Devin & Emy – $100,000 awarded ($50,000 each)

== Game summary ==
Episode		Gender	Winners	Lair contestants		Lair game	Lair outcome				
#	Mission	Gender	Winners	Voted In	Agency's Pick	Lair game	Winner(s)	Eliminated	Infiltrate	Infiltrator	Infiltrated Team
1	Compromised	—N/a	Aneesa & Logan	Michaela & Renan	Corey L.	Back Me Up	Corey L. & Michele	Michaela & Renan	Yes	Corey L.	Kelz & Tori
1	Compromised	—N/a	Aneesa & Logan	Michaela & Renan	Michele	Back Me Up	Corey L. & Michele	Michaela & Renan	Yes	Michele	Devin & Tracy
2	Heli Heist	—N/a	Esther & Fessy	Kelz & Tracy	Ed	Flipping Agents	Ed & Emy	Kelz & Tracy	Yes	Ed	Corey L. & Tori
2	Heli Heist	—N/a	Esther & Fessy	Kelz & Tracy	Emy	Flipping Agents	Ed & Emy	Kelz & Tracy	Yes	Emy	Devin & Michele
3	Sea Cave Recon	—N/a	Ed & Tori	~~Jeremiah &~~ Tacha	Berna	Slipping Up	Berna	Tacha	No	—N/a	
3	Sea Cave Recon	—N/a	Ed & Tori	~~Jeremiah &~~ Tacha	~~Corey L.~~	Slipping Up	Berna	Tacha	No	—N/a	
4	Undercover Comms	—N/a	Esther & Fessy	Corey L. & Michele	Amber	Down to the Wire	Amber & Hughie	Corey L. & Michele	Yes	Amber	Devin & Emy
4	Undercover Comms	—N/a	Esther & Fessy	Corey L. & Michele	Hughie	Down to the Wire	Amber & Hughie	Corey L. & Michele	Yes	Hughie	Gabo & Nany
5	Mindfield	—N/a	Berna & CT	~~Aneesa &~~ Logan	Gabo	Higher Assets	Logan	Gabo	Yes	Logan	Hughie & Nany
5	Mindfield	—N/a	Berna & CT	~~Aneesa &~~ Logan	—N/a	Higher Assets	Logan	Gabo	Yes	Logan	Hughie & Nany
6/7	Turning Agents	—N/a	Emanuel & Kaycee	Esther ~~& Fessy~~	Emy	Rage Cage	Emy	Esther	Yes	Emy	Berna & CT
6/7	Turning Agents	—N/a	Emanuel & Kaycee	Esther ~~& Fessy~~	—N/a	Rage Cage	Emy	Esther	Yes	Emy	Berna & CT
8	Dive Bomb	—N/a	CT & Emy	Berna & Hughie	Jeremiah	Race to Escape	Jeremiah & Priscilla	Berna & Hughie	Yes	Jeremiah	Ed & Tori
8	Dive Bomb	—N/a	CT & Emy	Berna & Hughie	Priscilla	Race to Escape	Jeremiah & Priscilla	Berna & Hughie	Yes	Priscilla	Ashley & Josh
9	Bombshell Battle	—N/a	Logan & Nany	Bettina & Cory	Amber	Hang in the Balance	Bettina & Cory	Amber & Jeremiah	—N/a		
9	Bombshell Battle	—N/a	Logan & Nany	Bettina & Cory	Jeremiah	Hang in the Balance	Bettina & Cory	Amber & Jeremiah	—N/a		
#	Mission	Gender	Winners	Agency's Pick	Called Out	Lair game	Winner	Eliminated	Infiltrate	Infiltrated Team	Swapped
10	Diamond Dash	Female	Emerald Cell	Priscilla	Ashley	Seek and Destroy	Ashley	Priscilla	No	—N/a	
11	Satellite Sabotage	Male	Emerald Cell	Ed	Kyle	Pole Wrestle	Kyle	Ed	Yes	Sapphire Cell	Nelson
12	Brush Contact	Female	Emerald Cell	Emy	Bettina	Bombs Away	Emy	Bettina	Yes	Sapphire Cell	Amanda
13	Sunken Intelligence	Male	Emerald Cell	Cory	Logan	Rope Burn	Logan	Cory	Yes	Sapphire Cell	Kyle
14	Submerged	Female	Sapphire Cell	Amanda	Big T	Vault Escape	Amanda	Big T	Yes	Emerald Cell	Tori
15	Boom Raiders	Male	Sapphire Cell	Kyle	Josh	Burning Bridges	Kyle	Josh	Yes	Sapphire Cell	Logan
16	Million Dollar Heist	Female	Emerald Cell	Big T	Emy	License to Chill	Emy	Big T	No	—N/a	
17	Dead Drop	Male	Sapphire Cell	Logan	Emanuel	Rocket Run	Emanuel	Logan	—N/a		
#	Mission	Gender	Winners	Voted In	Called Out	Lair game	Winner	Eliminated	—N/a		
18	—N/a	Female	—N/a	Amanda	Tori	Drone Drop	Tori	Amanda	—N/a		
18	—N/a	Male	—N/a	Emanuel	Devin	Triple Threat	Devin	Emanuel	—N/a		
18/19	Final Challenge	—N/a	CT & Kaycee	2nd: Kyle & Tori; 3rd: Devin & Emy; 4th: Nany and Nelson					—N/a		

=== Elimination progress ===
Contestants	Episodes																	
Contestants	1	2	3	4	5	6/7	8	9	10	11	12	13	14	15	16	17	18	Finale
CT	SAFE	SAFE	SAFE	SAFE	WIN	SAFE	WIN	SAFE	SAFE	SAFE	SAFE	SAFE	WIN	WIN	SAFE	WIN	SAFE	WINNER
Kaycee	SAFE	SAFE	SAFE	SAFE	SAFE	WIN	SAFE	SAFE	WIN	WIN	WIN	WIN	SAFE	SAFE	WIN	SAFE	SAFE	WINNER
Kyle	SAFE	SAFE	SAFE	SAFE	SAFE	SAFE	SAFE	SAFE	SAFE	ELIM	SAFE	SAFE	SAFE	ELIM	SAFE	WIN	SAFE	SECOND
Tori	SAFE	SAFE	WIN	SAFE	SAFE	SAFE	SAFE	SAFE	WIN	WIN	WIN	WIN	SAFE	SAFE	SAFE	SAFE	ELIM	SECOND
Devin	SAFE	SAFE	SAFE	SAFE	SAFE	SAFE	SAFE	SAFE	WIN	WIN	WIN	WIN	SAFE	SAFE	WIN	SAFE	ELIM	THIRD
Emy	SAFE	ELIM	SAFE	SAFE	SAFE	ELIM	WIN	SAFE	SAFE	SAFE	ELIM	SAFE	WIN	WIN	ELIM	WIN	SAFE	THIRD
Nany	SAFE	SAFE	SAFE	SAFE	SAFE	SAFE	SAFE	WIN	WIN	WIN	WIN	WIN	SAFE	SAFE	WIN	SAFE	SAFE	FOURTH
Nelson	SAFE	SAFE	SAFE	SAFE	SAFE	SAFE	SAFE	SAFE	SAFE	SAFE	SAFE	SAFE	SAFE	SAFE	SAFE	SAFE	SAFE	FOURTH
Emanuel	SAFE	SAFE	SAFE	SAFE	SAFE	WIN	SAFE	SAFE	WIN	WIN	WIN	WIN	SAFE	SAFE	WIN	ELIM	OUT	
Amanda	SAFE	SAFE	SAFE	SAFE	SAFE	SAFE	SAFE	SAFE	SAFE	SAFE	SAFE	SAFE	ELIM	SAFE	WIN	SAFE	OUT	
Logan	WIN	SAFE	SAFE	SAFE	ELIM	SAFE	SAFE	WIN	SAFE	SAFE	SAFE	ELIM	WIN	WIN	SAFE	OUT		
Big T	SAFE	SAFE	SAFE	SAFE	SAFE	SAFE	SAFE	SAFE	SAFE	SAFE	SAFE	SAFE	OUT	SAFE	OUT			
Josh	SAFE	SAFE	SAFE	SAFE	SAFE	SAFE	SAFE	SAFE	WIN	WIN	WIN	WIN	SAFE	OUT				
Ashley	SAFE	SAFE	SAFE	SAFE	SAFE	SAFE	SAFE	SAFE	ELIM	SAFE	SAFE	SAFE	DQ					
Cory	SAFE	SAFE	SAFE	SAFE	SAFE	SAFE	SAFE	ELIM	SAFE	SAFE	SAFE	OUT						
Bettina	SAFE	SAFE	SAFE	SAFE	SAFE	SAFE	SAFE	ELIM	SAFE	SAFE	OUT							
Ed	—N/a	ELIM	WIN	SAFE	SAFE	SAFE	SAFE	SAFE	SAFE	OUT								
Priscilla	SAFE	SAFE	SAFE	SAFE	SAFE	SAFE	ELIM	SAFE	OUT									
Amber	—N/a	SAFE	SAFE	ELIM	SAFE	SAFE	SAFE	OUT										
Jeremiah	SAFE	SAFE	NOM	SAFE	SAFE	SAFE	ELIM	OUT										
Berna	SAFE	SAFE	ELIM	SAFE	WIN	SAFE	OUT											
Hughie	SAFE	SAFE	SAFE	ELIM	SAFE	SAFE	OUT											
Esther	SAFE	WIN	SAFE	WIN	SAFE	OUT												
Fessy	SAFE	WIN	SAFE	WIN	SAFE	DQ												
Gabo	SAFE	SAFE	SAFE	SAFE	OUT													
Aneesa	WIN	SAFE	SAFE	SAFE	MED													
Corey L.	ELIM	SAFE	NOM	OUT														
Michele	ELIM	SAFE	SAFE	OUT														
Tacha	SAFE	SAFE	OUT															
Tommy	SAFE	SAFE	MED															
Kelz	SAFE	OUT																
Tracy	SAFE	OUT																
Lauren	SAFE	LEFT																
Michaela	OUT																	
Renan	OUT																	
Nam	LEFT																	

Competition
The contestant finished the final challenge and won
The contestant finished the final challenge and lost
The contestant was eliminated during the Final Challenge
The contestant won the daily challenge, was part of the Agency and was immune from elimination
The contestant was not selected for the Lair
The contestant was nominated for the Lair, but did not have to compete
The contestant was voted into the Lair and won
The contestant lost in the Lair and was eliminated
The contestant was removed from the competition due to disciplinary reasons
The contestant was removed from the competition due to medical reasons
The contestant left or was removed from the competition for undisclosed reasons

=== Team progress ===
Episodes 1-9: Male-Female Pairs
During the opening "Compromised" challenge, the international contestants had to select their initial partner of the opposite gender from the American contestants. They did not meet the American contestants beforehand and had to decide based only on dossiers provided during the previous night, and their prior knowledge. These pairs changed frequently due to the infiltration twist and pairs were not beholden to the American/International format moving forard. Pairs were disbanded at the start of the 10th episode.
Episodes 10-17: 3 Teams (Emerald, Ruby, and Sapphire)
The 18 remaining contestants were divided into three teams (called "cells") which were determined during first stage of the "Diamond Dash" challenge in episode 10. Teams were disbanded at the start of the 18th episode.

Contestants	Episodes																	
Contestants	1	2	3	4	5	6/7	8	9	10	11	12	13	14	15	16	17	Finale	
CT	Berna						Emy		Sapphire								Purple	Kaycee
Kaycee	Emanuel								Emerald								Orange	CT
Kyle	Amanda								Ruby		Sapphire		Ruby		Sapphire		Orange	Tori
Tori	Kelz	Corey L.	Ed					Jeremiah	Emerald					Ruby			Purple	Kyle
Devin	Tracy	Michele	Emy		Amber				Emerald								Purple	Emy
Emy	Corey L.	Ed	Devin		Gabo	Hughie	CT		Ruby			Sapphire					Purple	Devin
Nany	Gabo				Hughie	Logan			Emerald								Orange	
Nelson	Priscilla							Big T	Sapphire		Ruby						Orange	
Emanuel	Kaycee								Emerald									
Amanda	Kyle								Sapphire			Ruby		Emerald				
Logan	Aneesa					Nany			Ruby				Sapphire		Ruby			
Big T	Tommy			Jeremiah				Nelson	Ruby									
Josh	Lauren	Amber			Ashley			Priscilla	Emerald									
Ashley	Hughie				Josh			Ed	Sapphire									
Cory	Bettina								Ruby									
Bettina	Cory								Sapphire									
Ed		Emy	Tori					Ashley	Sapphire									
Priscilla	Nelson							Josh	Ruby									
Amber		Josh			Devin													
Jeremiah	Tacha			Big T				Tori										
Berna	CT						Hughie											
Hughie	Ashley				Nany	Emy	Berna											
Esther	Fessy																	
Fessy	Esther																	
Gabo	Nany				Emy													
Aneesa	Logan																	
Corey L.	Emy	Tori	Michele															
Michele	Nam	Devin	Corey L.															
Tacha	Jeremiah																	
Tommy	Big T																	
Kelz	Tori	Tracy																
Tracy	Devin	Kelz																
Lauren	Josh																	
Michaela	Renan																	
Renan	Michaela																	
Nam	Michele																	

- Teams at the start of each episode

== Voting progress ==
House Vote	**Michaela & Renan**; 29 of 31 votes		**Kelz & Tracy**; 19 of 30 votes		**Jeremiah & Tacha**; 18 of 27 votes		**Corey L. & Michele**; 19 of 26 votes		**Aneesa & Logan**; 21 of 23 votes	**Esther & Fessy**; 15 of 21 votes	**Berna & Hughie**; 20 of 20 votes		**Bettina & Cory**; 12 of 18 votes		—N/a								**Amanda**; 8 of 10 votes	**Emanuel**; 6 of 9 votes
Agency Vote	**Corey L.** 2 of 2 votes	**Michele**; 2 of 2 votes	**Ed**; 2 of 2 votes	**Emy**; 2 of 2 votes	**Berna**; 2 of 2 votes	**Corey L.** 2 of 2 votes	**Amber**; 2 of 2 votes	**Hughie**; 2 of 2 votes	**Gabo**; 2 of 2 votes	**Emy**; 2 of 2 votes	**Jeremiah**; 2 of 2 votes	**Priscilla**; 2 of 2 votes	**Amber**; 2 of 2 votes	**Jeremiah**; 2 of 2 votes	**Priscilla**; Emerald Cell's vote	**Ed**; Emerald Cell's vote	**Emy**; Emerald Cell's vote	**Cory**; Emerald Cell's vote	**Amanda**; Sapphire Cell's vote	**Kyle**; Sapphire Cell's vote	**Big T** Emerald Cell's vote	**Logan**; Sapphire Cell's vote	—N/a	
Called Out	—N/a														**Ashley** called out	**Kyle** called out	**Bettina** called out	**Logan** called out	**Big T** called out	**Josh** called out	**Emy** called out	**Emanuel** called out	**Tori** called out	**Devin** called out
Voter	Episodes																							
Voter	1		2		3		4		5	6/7	8		9		10	11	12	13	14	15	16	17	18	
CT	Michaela & Renan		Aneesa & Logan		Jeremiah & Tacha		Corey L. & Michele		**Gabo**	Esther & Fessy	**Jeremiah**	**Priscilla**	Bettina & Cory						—N/a	—N/a		—N/a	Amanda	Emanuel
Kaycee	Michaela & Renan		Kelz & Tracy		Jeremiah & Tacha		Corey L. & Michele		Aneesa & Logan	**Emy**	Berna & Hughie		Bettina & Cory		—N/a	—N/a	—N/a	—N/a			—N/a		Amanda	Emanuel
Kyle	Michaela & Renan		Kelz & Tracy		Jeremiah & Tacha		Corey L. & Michele		Aneesa & Logan	Esther & Fessy	Berna & Hughie		Bettina & Cory							Josh		—N/a	Amanda	Emanuel
Tori	Michaela & Renan		Ed & Emy		**Berna**	**Corey L.**	Corey L. & Michele		Aneesa & Logan	Esther & Fessy	Berna & Hughie		Bettina & Cory		—N/a	—N/a	—N/a	—N/a					Amanda	Nelson
Devin	Michaela & Renan		Kelz & Tracy		Jeremiah & Tacha		Corey L. & Michele		Aneesa & Logan	Esther & Fessy	Berna & Hughie		Bettina & Cory		—N/a	—N/a	—N/a	—N/a			—N/a		Amanda	Emanuel
Emy	Michaela & Renan		Ashley & Hughie		Jeremiah & Tacha		Big T & Jeremiah		Aneesa & Logan	Esther & Fessy	**Jeremiah**	**Priscilla**	Bettina & Cory				Bettina		—N/a	—N/a		—N/a	Amanda	Nelson
Nany	Michaela & Renan		Kelz & Tracy		Jeremiah & Tacha		Corey L. & Michele		Aneesa & Logan	Esther & Fessy	Berna & Hughie		**Amber**	**Jeremiah**	—N/a	—N/a	—N/a	—N/a			—N/a		Amanda	Emanuel
Nelson	Michaela & Renan		Kelz & Tracy		Jeremiah & Tacha		Corey L. & Michele		Aneesa & Logan	Esther & Fessy	Berna & Hughie		Ashley & Ed										Tori	Emanuel
Emanuel	Michaela & Renan		Emanuel & Kaycee		Jeremiah & Tacha		Big T & Jeremiah		Aneesa & Logan	**Emy**	Berna & Hughie		Bettina & Cory		—N/a	—N/a	—N/a	—N/a			—N/a		Amanda	Devin
Amanda	Michaela & Renan		Kelz & Tracy		Jeremiah & Tacha		Corey L. & Michele		Aneesa & Logan	Esther & Fessy	Berna & Hughie		Bettina & Cory						Big T		—N/a		Tori	
Logan	**Corey L.**	**Michele**	Kelz & Tracy		Ashley & Hughie		Ashley & Hughie		Emy & Gabo	Esther & Fessy	Berna & Hughie		**Amber**	**Jeremiah**					—N/a	—N/a		Emanuel		
Big T	Michaela & Renan		Kelz & Tracy		Big T & Tommy		Corey L. & Michele		Emy & Gabo	Emy & Hughie	Berna & Hughie		Bettina & Cory								Emy			
Josh	Michaela & Renan		Kelz & Tracy		Jeremiah & Tacha		Big T & Jeremiah		Aneesa & Logan	Emy & Hughie	Berna & Hughie		Bettina & Cory		—N/a	—N/a	—N/a	—N/a						
Ashley	Michaela & Renan		Kelz & Tracy		Jeremiah & Tacha		Corey L. & Michele		Aneesa & Logan	Esther & Fessy	Berna & Hughie		Bettina & Cory											
Cory	Michaela & Renan		Kelz & Tracy		Jeremiah & Tacha		Corey L. & Michele		Aneesa & Logan	Esther & Fessy	Berna & Hughie		Ashley & Ed					Logan						
Bettina	Michaela & Renan		Kelz & Tracy		Jeremiah & Tacha		Corey L. & Michele		Aneesa & Logan	Esther & Fessy	Berna & Hughie		Ashley & Ed											
Ed			Ashley & Hughie		**Berna**	**Corey L.**	Corey L. & Michele		Aneesa & Logan	Berna & CT	Berna & Hughie		Bettina & Cory			Kyle								
Priscilla	Michaela & Renan		Ed & Emy		Amber & Josh		Corey L. & Michele		Aneesa & Logan	Berna & CT	Berna & Hughie		Ashley & Ed		Ashley									
Amber			Kelz & Tracy		Jeremiah & Tacha		Corey L. & Michele		Aneesa & Logan	Esther & Fessy	Berna & Hughie		Ashley & Ed											
Jeremiah	Michaela & Renan		Aneesa & Logan		Aneesa & Logan		Corey L. & Michele		Aneesa & Logan	Berna & CT	Berna & Hughie		Ashley & Ed											
Berna	Michaela & Renan		Kelz & Tracy		Big T & Tommy		Corey L. & Michele		**Gabo**	Amber & Devin	Berna & Hughie													
Hughie	Michaela & Renan		Kelz & Tracy		Ashley & Hughie		Ashley & Hughie		Aneesa & Logan	Esther & Fessy	Berna & Hughie													
Esther	Michaela & Renan		**Ed**	**Emy**	Corey L. & Michele		**Amber**	**Hughie**	Aneesa & Logan	Esther & Fessy														
Fessy	Michaela & Renan		**Ed**	**Emy**	Esther & Fessy		**Amber**	**Hughie**	Aneesa & Logan															
Gabo	Michaela & Renan		Kelz & Tracy		Jeremiah & Tacha		Corey L. & Michele		Aneesa & Logan															
Aneesa	**Corey L.**	**Michele**	Kelz & Tracy		Jeremiah & Tacha		Corey L. & Michele																	
Corey L.	Michaela & Renan		Kelz & Tracy		Jeremiah & Tacha		Devin & Emy																	
Michele	Michaela & Renan		Kelz & Tracy		Jeremiah & Tacha		Aneesa & Logan																	
Tacha	Michaela & Renan		Devin & Michele		Corey L. & Michele																			
Tommy	Michaela & Renan		Aneesa & Logan																					
Kelz	Michaela & Renan		Amber & Josh																					
Tracy	Michaela & Renan		Ed & Emy																					
Lauren	Michaela & Renan																							
Michaela	Corey L. & Emy																							
Renan	Josh & Lauren																							
Nam																								

Key

Bold indicates the player was voted in by the Agency
— indicates the player's Agency vote was not shown

== Episodes ==
No. overall	No. in season	Title	Original release date	US viewers (millions)
489	1	"The List"	August 11, 2021	0.66
490	2	"Bertha"	August 18, 2021	0.62
491	3	"Truce or Dare"	August 25, 2021	0.51
492	4	"Messy"	September 1, 2021	0.50
493	5	"Good Vibes and Gladiator"	September 8, 2021	0.59
494	6	"Alien"	September 15, 2021	0.71
495	7	"Uncle CT"	September 22, 2021	0.61
496	8	"The Threat"	September 29, 2021	0.65
497	9	"The War"	October 6, 2021	0.55
498	10	"Precious Stones"	October 13, 2021	0.67
499	11	"Mucus Plug"	October 20, 2021	0.61
500	12	"500"	October 27, 2021	0.62
501	13	"Titanic"	November 3, 2021	0.68
502	14	"Mavericks"	November 10, 2021	0.60
503	15	"The Cave of The Wolf"	November 17, 2021	0.63
504	16	"Riverdance"	November 24, 2021	0.71
505	17	"Drop Dead"	December 1, 2021	0.68
506	18	"Night of Mistakes"	December 8, 2021	0.66
507	19	"The Decision"	December 15, 2021	0.72

=== Reunion special ===
The Reunion special aired on December 22, 2021 and was hosted by entertainment personality Maria Menounos. Cast members attended in Amsterdam, Netherlands.
