= The Challenge Sverige season 1 =

1st season of the reality television series

The Challenge Sverige
- Season 1
- Presented by: Pischa Strindstedt
- No. of contestants: 24
- Winners: Jens Rönnqvist; Sandra Cucarano
- Location: Larnaca, Cyprus
- No. of episodes: 20

Release
- Original network: TV4
- Original release: August 12 – October 10, 2024

Season chronology
- Next → Season 2

The first season of The Challenge Sverige premiered on TV4 on 12 August, 2024. The season features Swedish reality television participants competing in various challenges for the chance to win SEK 1,000,000.

The season is hosted by fitness trainer Pischa Strindstedt, and was filmed in Larnaca, Cyprus in 2023.

The season finale saw Jens Rönnqvist & Sandra Cucarano win the season after defeating Jennifer Schill & Viktor Bergström in the Final Challenge.

== Format ==
A cycle of The Challenge Sverige features two "immunity challenges," a nomination process and an elimination round. The season had players competing in male-female teams of two, which were initially determined in the first episode.

- First immunity challenge: The winning team of the first challenge receives immunity from elimination while the last-place team(s) receive a disadvantage for the cycle's second immunity challenge. Afterwards, the winners nominate one team to compete in the elimination round.
- Second immunity challenge: The winning team of the second challenge receives immunity from elimination. If the team that won the first immunity challenge also wins the second immunity challenge, they must give away the second immunity to another team of their choice.
- Nominations: Teams vote to determine the opponents of the team selected for the elimination round by the winners of the first immunity challenge. If the vote is tied, the vote of the winners of the first immunity challenge counts as the tiebreaker.
  - From episode 1-12, teams vote for a non-immune team to compete in the elimination round.
  - From episode 12-16, teams vote for one male and one female player (regardless of whether or not they are a team) to individually compete against the same-sex player from the team voted into the elimination round by the winners of the first immunity challenge.
- Eliminations (The Arena): The nominated teams/individuals compete against each other in an elimination round at the Arena. The winners remain in the game while the defeated contestants are eliminated.

From episode 17, no immunity was awarded to the winners of either "immunity challenge" and the subsequent cycles had a modified format due to limited teams remaining.

- For the episode 17/18/19 cycle, the winner of each challenge selects one team to compete (as individuals) in the Arena.
- For the episode 19/20 cycle, the last-place team of the first challenge receives a disadvantage in the second challenge. In the second challenge, the winners receive an advantage for the cycle's third challenge. Afterwards, the last-place team in the third challenge is eliminated while the remaining two teams compete in the Final Challenge to determine the champions of the season.

Twists

- Partner swap: Teams can swap through several means. Firstly, contestants who newly enter the competition (episodes 3, 5 and 7) can select any player as their first partner. Secondly, the winners of each elimination round may select a new partner if they wish. Thirdly, the winners of the first immunity challenge in episode 15 could forfeit their immunity and swap partners instead. Players left unpaired as a result of these selections form a new team by default.
- Purge challenge: The third challenge of the episode 19/20 cycle was a Purge challenge, where the last-place team was automatically eliminated.

== Contestants ==
Male contestants	Original series	Finish
Jens Thomas Rönnqvist	The Farm 2020	Winner
Viktor Bergström	The Farm 2023	Runner-up
Anthony Yigit (Note: Anthony and Elin joined the competition at the start of episode 3.)	SAS: Who Dares Wins Sweden 2021	Episode 20
Robin Johansen (Note: Izabella and Robin joined the competition at the start of episode 5.)	The Farm 2018	Episode 19
Alexander Segerström	The Farm 2022	Episode 16
Homayon Sytes (Note: Homayon, Matilda, Phillip and Sandra joined the competition at the start of episode 7.)	Robinson: Malaysia	Episode 14
Cruise Ferreira	Robinson 2020	Episode 12
Phillip-Lloyd "Phillip" Rochester	The Farm 2021	Episode 11 (Note: Phillip was medically removed from the competition after breaking his leg during the episode 10/11 elimination round against Homayon.)
Fabian Thingwall (Note: Joshua withdrew from the competition at the start of episode 8, before the cycle's second immunity challenge, due to personal reasons. Fabian returned to the competition as a replacement for Joshua.)	Robinson 2020	Episode 8
Joshua Akena	The Bachelorette Sweden 2022	Episode 8
Carl Bengtsson	The Bachelorette Sweden 2021	Episode 4
Valentino Demina	Robinson: Malaysia	Episode 2

Female contestants	Original series	Finish
Sandra Cucarano	Robinson 2022	Winner
Jennifer Schill	The Farm 2021	Runner-up
Elvira Svensson	The Bachelor Sweden 2021	Episode 20
Matilda Borgström	The Bachelor Sweden 2021	Episode 18 (Note: After the first round of the elimination in episode 18, Matilda forfeited the elimination to Jennifer due to fear of the impending physical contact which came as part of the elimination.)
Joanna Swica	Robinson 2021	Episode 16
Helené Fransson	The Farm 2022	Episode 14
Elin Härkönen	SAS: Who Dares Wins Sweden 2021	Episode 12 (Note: Immediately before the episode 12 elimination, Elin forfeited the elimination to Sandra, fearing further injury to herself after previously suffering a torn ligament.)
Emmy Rönning	The Bachelor Sweden 2019	Episode 10 (Note: Prior to the nomination vote in episode 10, Emmy withdrew from the competition after feeling guilty about potentially having to go back on her word for the vote, and generally feeling unwell. Due to uneven numbers after her withdrawal, the episode 10/11 Arena was held as an individual male elimination round.)
Izabella Anderson	The Farm 2022	Episode 8
Isabella Resmark	Robinson 2022	Episode 6
Olivia Baldwin	Robinson 2021	Episode 4
Greta Pierre	Robinson: Malaysia	Episode 2

== Game summary ==
Episode	First immunity challenge		Second immunity challenge		Arena contestants			Arena outcome	
Episode	Winners	Disadvantage	Winners	Immunity	1st winners' pick	Voted in	2nd winners' pick	Winners	Eliminated
1/2	Jennifer & Viktor	Alexander & Emmy	Jennifer & Viktor	Helené & Jens	Carl & Olivia	Greta & Valentino	—N/a	Carl & Olivia	Greta & Valentino
3/4	Jennifer & Viktor	Alexander & Emmy	Jennifer & Viktor	Alexander & Emmy	Carl & Olivia	Elvira & Joshua	—N/a	Elvira & Joshua	Carl & Olivia
3/4	Jennifer & Viktor	Carl & Olivia	Jennifer & Viktor	Alexander & Emmy	Carl & Olivia	Elvira & Joshua	—N/a	Elvira & Joshua	Carl & Olivia
3/4	Jennifer & Viktor	Elvira & Joshua	Jennifer & Viktor	Alexander & Emmy	Carl & Olivia	Elvira & Joshua	—N/a	Elvira & Joshua	Carl & Olivia
5/6	Jennifer & Viktor	Alexander & Emmy	Jennifer & Viktor	Helené & Jens	Fabian & Isabella	Elin & Robin	—N/a	Elin & Robin	Fabian & Isabella
5/6	Jennifer & Viktor	Anthony & Joanna	Jennifer & Viktor	Helené & Jens	Fabian & Isabella	Elin & Robin	—N/a	Elin & Robin	Fabian & Isabella
5/6	Jennifer & Viktor	Fabian & Isabella	Jennifer & Viktor	Helené & Jens	Fabian & Isabella	Elin & Robin	—N/a	Elin & Robin	Fabian & Isabella
5/6	Jennifer & Viktor	Izabella & Joshua	Jennifer & Viktor	Helené & Jens	Fabian & Isabella	Elin & Robin	—N/a	Elin & Robin	Fabian & Isabella
7/8	Jennifer & Phillip	Alexander & Emmy	Helené & Homayon		Cruise & Matilda	Fabian & Izabella	—N/a	Cruise & Matilda	Fabian & Izabella
9/10/11	Anthony & Elin	Alexander & Emmy	Cruise & Joanna		~~Helené &~~ Homayon	Phillip	—N/a	Homayon	Phillip
9/10/11	Anthony & Elin	Helené & Homayon	Cruise & Joanna		~~Helené &~~ Homayon	Phillip	—N/a	Homayon	Phillip
11/12	Alexander & Jennifer	Elvira & Viktor	Matilda & Robin		Jens & Sandra	Cruise	—N/a	Jens	Cruise
11/12	Alexander & Jennifer	Helené & Homayon	Matilda & Robin		Jens & Sandra	Elin	—N/a	Sandra	Elin
13/14	Anthony & Joanna	Alexander & Jennifer	Jens & Sandra		Helené & Homayon	Jennifer	—N/a	Jennifer	Helené
13/14	Anthony & Joanna	Jens & Sandra	Jens & Sandra		Helené & Homayon	Viktor	—N/a	Viktor	Homayon
15/16	Jens & Sandra	Matilda & Robin	Matilda & Robin		Anthony & Joanna	Alexander	—N/a	Anthony	Alexander
15/16	Jens & Sandra	Matilda & Robin	Matilda & Robin		Anthony & Joanna	Jennifer	—N/a	Jennifer	Joanna
17/18/19	Jennifer & Viktor	—N/a	Jens & Sandra	—N/a	Matilda & Robin	—N/a	Jennifer & Viktor	Jennifer	Matilda
17/18/19	Jennifer & Viktor	—N/a	Jens & Sandra	—N/a	Matilda & Robin	—N/a	Jennifer & Viktor	Viktor	Robin
19/20	Jens & Sandra	Anthony & Elvira	Anthony & Elvira	—N/a					Anthony & Elvira
20 (Finale)	Jens & Sandra	2nd: Jennifer & Viktor							

=== Game progress ===
Contestants	Episodes										
Contestants	1/2	3/4	5/6	7/8	9/10/11	11/12	13/14	15/16	17/18/19	19/20	20
Jens	IMM	SAFE	IMM	SAFE	SAFE	ELIM	WON	WIN	WON	WIN	WINNER
Sandra	—N/a			SAFE	SAFE	ELIM	WON	WIN	WON	WIN	WINNER
Jennifer	WIN	WIN	WIN	WIN	SAFE	WIN	ELIM	ELIM	ELIM	SAFE	SECOND
Viktor	WIN	WIN	WIN	SAFE	SAFE	SAFE	ELIM	SAFE	ELIM	SAFE	SECOND
Anthony	—N/a	SAFE	SAFE	SAFE	WIN	SAFE	WIN	ELIM	SAFE	LAST	
Elvira	SAFE	ELIM	SAFE	SAFE	SAFE	SAFE	SAFE	SAFE	SAFE	LAST	
Robin	—N/a		ELIM	SAFE	SAFE	WON	SAFE	WON	OUT		
Matilda	—N/a			ELIM	SAFE	WON	SAFE	WON	QUIT		
Alexander	SAFE	IMM	SAFE	SAFE	SAFE	WIN	SAFE	OUT			
Joanna	SAFE	SAFE	SAFE	SAFE	WON	SAFE	WIN	OUT			
Helené	IMM	SAFE	IMM	WON	NOM	SAFE	OUT				
Homayon	—N/a			WON	ELIM	SAFE	OUT				
Cruise	SAFE	SAFE	SAFE	ELIM	WON	OUT					
Elin	—N/a	SAFE	ELIM	SAFE	WIN	QUIT					
Phillip	—N/a			WIN	MED						
Emmy	SAFE	IMM	SAFE	SAFE	QUIT						
Fabian	SAFE	SAFE	OUT	OUT							
Izabella	—N/a		SAFE	OUT							
Joshua	SAFE	ELIM	SAFE	QUIT							
Isabella	SAFE	SAFE	OUT								
Carl	ELIM	OUT									
Olivia	ELIM	OUT									
Greta	OUT										
Valentino	OUT										

Competition key
The contestant won the Final Challenge
The contestant finished as the runner-up in the Final Challenge
The contestant won the second immunity challenge, then placed last in the Purge challenge and was eliminated
The contestant won the first immunity challenge
The contestant won the second immunity challenge
The contestant was awarded immunity by the team that won the first immunity challenge, as they also won the second immunity challenge
The contestant was not selected for the Arena
The contestant was nominated for the Arena but did not have to compete
The contestant won the elimination in the Arena
The contestant lost in the Arena and was eliminated
The contestant withdrew from the competition
The contestant was medically removed from the competition

== Team progress ==
Contestants	Episodes										
Contestants	1/2	3/4	5/6	7/8	9/10/11	11/12	13/14	15/16	17/18/19	19/20	20
Jens	Helené			Sandra							
Sandra	—N/a			Jens							
Jennifer	Viktor			Phillip		Alexander		Viktor			
Viktor	Jennifer			Elvira				Jennifer			
Anthony	—N/a	Joanna			Elin		Joanna		Elvira		
Elvira	Cruise	Joshua	Cruise	Viktor				Alexander	Anthony		
Matilda	—N/a			Cruise	Robin						
Robin	—N/a		Elin		Matilda						
Alexander	Emmy					Jennifer		Elvira			
Joanna	Joshua	Anthony			Cruise		Anthony				
Helené	Jens			Homayon							
Homayon	—N/a			Helené							
Cruise	Elvira	Elin	Elvira	Matilda	Joanna						
Elin	—N/a	Cruise	Robin		Anthony						
Phillip	—N/a			Jennifer							
Emmy	Alexander										
Fabian	Isabella			Izabella							
Izabella	—N/a		Joshua	Joshua; Fabian							
Joshua	Joanna	Elvira	Izabella								
Isabella	Fabian										
Carl	Olivia										
Olivia	Carl										
Greta	Valentino										
Valentino	Greta										

Teams for the challenges and/or eliminations of each cycle

== Episodes ==
Season 1
No. overall	No. in season	Title	Original release date
1	1	"Den första utmaningen"	August 12, 2024
First Immunity Challenge: To determine the initial teams, the male players begin harnessed to a bar above water. The female players must swim from a platform to shore, run to the structure where the male players are harnessed from, and unclip an available male player to be their partner. Newly-formed teams then enter the water and collect one underwater puzzle piece, return to shore where the rest of their puzzle pieces are, and solve the puzzle. The first team to finish wins.
2	2	"Inte stöta sig"	August 12, 2024
Second Immunity Challenge: One team member must stack blocks to build a tower. While they do so, their partner must hold up a metal loop so that it does not touch the surrounding buzz wire. Each time the loop touches the buzz wire, the team member stacking the blocks gets electrocuted. As a disadvantage for placing last in the previous challenge, Alexander & Emmy must stack one extra block for their tower. Elimination Challenge: First, the male team members must run through a narrow hallway, past/through their opponent, and tag their female partner at the other end. The female partners then repeat this process but must instead ring a bell at the end. The first team to ring their bell wins the round. The first team to win two rounds wins.
3	3	"Gladiatorernas ankomst"	August 15, 2024
First Immunity Challenge: Teams must swim underwater from one platform to another. Along the way are three "air pocket" tanks for teams to breathe while underwater. Teams are disqualified from the challenge if a team member resurfaces for air before reaching the platform. The team with the fastest time wins.
4	4	"Farmensekten"	August 15, 2024
Second Immunity Challenge: Teams must retrieve ten tyres labelled with cities from a pole and stack them on another pole at the other end of a field, arranging the cities from north to south. The team with the most cities in the correct position wins, with ties broken by time. As a disadvantage for being disqualified from the previous challenge, Alexander & Emmy, Carl & Olivia and Joshua & Elvira are imposed a 20-second penalty. Elimination Challenge: Played in a male and female round. Each round, players begin in the center of the Arena with both hands on a figure-eight ring. They must attempt to pull the ring to their end of the Arena and touch their team's colored platform while their opponent tries to do the same. The first player to touch their team's platform while holding onto the ring wins the round for their team. The first team to win two rounds wins.
5	5	"Kärlek och mordhot"	August 19, 2024
First Immunity Challenge: One team member is suspended from a beam above water. They must pull themselves to the end of the beam to view seven numbers, unclip themselves into the water below, swim to shore and use the numbers to solve a math equation. The solution forms the combination which unlocks their partner who is chained to the ground. Once the team member chained to the ground is unlocked, teams race to collect one of four sledgehammers. The four teams left without a sledgehammer are eliminated from the challenge. Teams who collect a sledgehammer must then break open a crate of puzzle pieces and solve the puzzle. The first team to finish wins.
6	6	"Den riktiga paktkungen"	August 22, 2024
Second Immunity Challenge: One team member must pull a chain connected to 200 kilograms of cement blocks by various means to the end of a 70-metre track. As they do so, their partner can dig through sand to find three items to help disconnect cement blocks from the chain: a key, pliers and a lock combination. The first team to pull their chain to the finish line wins. As a disadvantage for being eliminated from the previous challenge, Alexander & Emmy, Anthony & Joanna, Fabian & Isabella and Izabella & Joshua are imposed a 10-second penalty. Elimination Challenge: Both teams begin strapped together by their backs in the center of a platform. The first team to drag or push their opponents down their respective ramp of the platform wins the round. The first team to win two rounds wins the elimination.
7	7	"Falla fritt"	August 26, 2024
First Immunity Challenge: Teams attempt to hang from a structure above water for as long as possible, and are eliminated from the challenge if one team member drops into the water below. The last team to have both members still hanging wins.
8	8	"Sparka på den som ligger"	August 29, 2024
Second Immunity Challenge: Played in male and female rounds. Each round, contestants enter a pit, where contact is allowed, to reach a rod with a color sequence on it. They must memorize the sequence, return to their station and arrange number tiles to replicate the sequence. The numbers on the tiles then form a math equation which they must solve to get the combination to unlock a flag to stop their time. The team with the fastest combined time from both rounds wins. As a disadvantage for placing last in the previous challenge, Alexander & Emmy must wait five seconds before they can enter the pit. Elimination Challenge: First, the male teammates must punch or kick holes through a 7.5-metre drywall so they can climb the wall and ring a bell at the top. Once they do so, the female teammate then repeats this process. The first team to have both teammates ring the bell wins.
9	9	"Svindlande höjder"	September 2, 2024
First Immunity Challenge: Teams begin harnessed on a platform above water. They must swing across bars underneath the platform to collect four hanging rings and return them to the top. Teams are eliminated from the challenge if a team member lets go of the bars and falls. The team with the most rings collected wins.
10	10	"Trauma och tragedi"	September 5, 2024
Second Immunity Challenge: Team members alternate turns cycling around a course containing obstacles including a ramp and mudpit. The first team to complete four laps wins. As a disadvantage for placing last in the previous challenge, Alexander & Emmy and Helené & Homayon are imposed a five-second penalty. Elimination Challenge: Players begin in the center of the Arena with both hands on a pole. They attempt to wrestle their opponent for the pole and bring it to their side of the Arena. The first player to touch their mat at their end of the Arena while holding the pole wins the round. The first player to win two rounds wins.
11	11	"Den ljuva hämnden"	September 9, 2024
First Immunity Challenge: Played across three rounds, teams must retrieve four of their colored balls from a mud pit and return them to their station one at a time, alternating team members each time. Once teams collect all four balls, they must retrieve a black ball to advance to the next round while the number of black balls decrease each round. Teams are eliminated from the challenge if they are unable to collect a black ball. The team that retrieves the sole black ball in the final round wins.
12	12	"Krossade hjärtan"	September 12, 2024
Second Immunity Challenge: Teams must pull a 100-kilogram sled across a field then stack four cubes so that each side shows four unique symbols. Before the challenge begins, each team is given two sandbags to place on other teams' sleds to make them heavier. As a disadvantage for placing last in the previous challenge, Elvira & Viktor and Helené & Homayon must place their bags on their own sled. The first team to complete their stack wins. Elimination Challenge: Players begin strapped together by their backs at the center of the Arena. The first player to drag or push their opponent to their side of the Arena wins.
13	13	"Fångad i en bur"	September 16, 2024
First Immunity Challenge: Teams must swim underwater through five partially submerged cages, exit the final cage and swim a flag to a buoy. Each cage has a small section at the top which is not submerged, where players may resurface for air. Along the way, teams must also collect three keys from the seafloor to unlock the exit of the final cage. Teams are disqualified from the challenge if a team member exits a cage to resurface for air or refuses to participate. The team with the fastest time wins.
14	14	"Iskyla och utpressning"	September 19, 2024
Second Immunity Challenge: One team member must submerge themself in an ice bath while their partner assembles a puzzle. If the team member in the ice bath is unable to withstand the cold anymore, they must exit the bath and trade places with their partner assembling the puzzle. The first team to assemble their puzzle wins. As a disadvantage for placing last in the previous immunity challenge, Alexander & Jennifer and Jens & Sandra are imposed a 10-second penalty. Elimination Challenge: Played across two rounds; each round, players play both offense and defense once. The offense player attempts to deposit a ball into one of two barrels at the center of a ring while the defense player attempts to stop them by blocking them and taking the ball out of their opponent's hands or the out of the ring. Players then switch positions and repeat this process. The player with the most balls scored at the end of two rounds wins.
15	15	"Ett evigt ältande"	September 23, 2024
First Immunity Challenge: One team member sits on a chair leaning over water while their partner answers trivia questions. If the team member answers the question correctly, they can select another team to have their chair tilt back once. However, teams' own chair tilts back if they answer incorrectly. Teams are eliminated from the challenge once their chair tilts back three times, dropping the team member sitting into the water. The last team standing wins.
16	16	"Otur och svek"	September 26, 2024
Second Immunity Challenge: Teams must transfer dozens of tyres through an obstacle course and stack them on a platform at the end. The first team to finish wins. As a disadvantage for placing last in the previous challenge, Matilda & Robin must transfer two extra tyres. Elimination Challenge: Players begin connected to their opponent by a chain at the center of the Arena and attempt to collect a flag at the boundary of the Arena while their opponent tries to do the same for the flag at the opposite end. If a stalemate persists after 30 minutes, the flags are moved closer in. The first player to collect their flag wins.
17	17	"Pandoras ask"	September 30, 2024
First Immunity Challenge: Teams must maneuver themselves along a chain through an obstacle, then remove cinder blocks from a platform to collect a key underneath and unlock themselves from the chain. Afterwards, teams must roll a 300-kilogram barrel uphill to a platform. The first team to finish wins.
18	18	"Grattis på födelsedagen!"	October 3, 2024
Second Immunity Challenge: One team member must drive a dune buggy around a course while their partner fires a paintball gun to hit targets along the course from the passenger seat. During each team's turn, opposing teams and several "snipers" fire paintballs at them in an attempt to distract them. The team to shoot all the targets and cross the finish line in the fastest time wins. Elimination Challenge: Players must run through a narrow hallway, past/through their opponent, and ring a bell at the end. The player to ring the bell first in two rounds wins.
19	19	"Håll andan inför finalen"	October 7, 2024
First Immunity Challenge: Each team member must use a saw to cut off one slice from an iron pipe. The first team to finish wins. Second Immunity Challenge: One team member must untangle a chain from a board suspended above ground to collect three keys and use them to unlock a flag. For them to reach the board, their partner is suspended above a water tank and must pull themselves down a rope into the water. Both team member's harnesses are connected in a way that each time the team member lowers into the water, their partner rises up the board, allowing them to untangle the chain during this time. The first team to finish wins an advantage for the next challenge. As a disadvantage for placing last in the previous challenge, Anthony & Elvira are imposed a 10-second penalty.
20	20	"Kampen om miljonen!"	October 10, 2024
Purge Challenge: Teams begin chained to the ground and must use sledgehammers to break cinder blocks and place the rubble through a mesh screen into a container at one end of a seesaw-like structure. Once teams collect enough rubble, the structure rises to reveal a key which teams use to unlock themselves from the chain. The first two teams to finish progress to the Final Challenge while the last team is eliminated. As an advantage for winning the previous challenge, Anthony & Elvira begin with one bucket of rubble already in their structure. Final Challenge: Teams must break through three dry walls in a structure to reach a tower in the middle containing 24 puzzle pieces. They must take all 24 puzzle pieces to their board and use them to solve the puzzle. The first team to solve the puzzle are declared the champions of the season.

== Reception ==
The show received criticism for production handing of contestant safety, being described as "harshly conducted".

In episode 13, the immunity challenge required teams to swim underwater through five partially submerged cages, with each cage having only a small non-submerged section at the top where contestants can resurface for air (without forfeiting the challenge). During the challenge, Elvira Svensson became trapped at the top of a cage while resurfacing, causing her to swallow water and lose consciousness while waves repeatedly washed over the top of the cage. She was rescued by safety divers and required oxygen and several hours of medical attention.

Svensson stated that her teammate Viktor Bergström had to call for help several times before the safety divers were sent out to rescue her. Svensson also criticised the lack of psychological support following the incident. In a statement to Aftonbladet, executive producer Joel Bendrik stated that participant safety was production's highest priority and claimed that Svensson received "immediate help" when production saw she was having problems.

Additionally, Phillip Rochester broke his leg during the episode 10 elimination round against Homayon Sytes, which involved contestants attempting to wrestle a pole out of their opponent's hands, and required hospitalisation, leading to his medical removal from the competiiton.

In response to the above incidents, among other contestant injuries, TV4 also described enhanced security measures for the second season. These involved evaluating safety conditions from the first season and reaffirming that challenges are safety tested in advance. Additionally, contestants undergo psychological testing before the program, and are provided the opportunity to meet with a psychologist during and after filming.
