= Dave Kerpen =

American entrepreneur, author and speaker

- Education: Boston University
- Occupations: Entrepreneur, author
- Known for: Co-founding Likeable Media
- Notable work: Likeable Social Media (2011); Likeable Business (2012); The Art of People (2016); Get Over Yourself (2024)
- Spouse: Carrie Kerpen (m. 2006)

Dave Kerpen is a New York based author and entrepreneur. Kerpen authored several books including Likeable Social Media (2011), Likeable Business (2012) published by McGraw-Hill. The Art of People (Crown Business) came later in 2016 followed by Get Over Yourself (BenBella Books) in 2024. He cofounded a social media company Likeable Media with his wife Carrie that he later sold. Kerpen also appeared on Paradise Hotel on Fox in 2003.

== Early life and education ==
After growing up in Brooklyn in a "typical dysfunctional Jewish" family, he went to Hunter College High School and then to Boston University. Kerpen began working as a vendor at Fenway Park in the summer of 1996, before his junior year at Boston University, and at the FleetCenter that fall, where he sold Crunch 'n Munch on commission. His sales routine of shouting, singing and dancing in the aisles earned him the nickname "the Crunch 'n Munch Guy". Clay Siegert of the Herald wrote in 1998 that the routine had made him "a local celebrity", and Richard C. Whiteley, in his 2001 book Love the Work You're With, wrote that Kerpen had "turned a routine sales job into high-flying, first-class entertainment".

After graduating from Boston University, Kerpen worked as a financial counselor at Merrimack Estate and Business Planning Group in North Andover, Massachusetts, while continuing to work as a vendor at night. He had joined the firm as an intern after its managing director saw him vending at a Bruins game in 1996.

== Reality TV and other events ==
In 2003, Kerpen was a contestant on Paradise Hotel, a dating reality show on Fox filmed at a resort in Acapulco. Andrew Goldman of The New York Times wrote that he "politicked and double-dealt for three months" to reach the last four contestants. Heather Havrilesky of Salon described him as the "smart, regular-looking guy" who became "the driving force" behind a group of contestants known as the Barbies. In the finale, his game partner was given the option of splitting a $250,000 prize with him and kept the full amount, which left him the only finalist without prize money.

Kerpen married Caroline (Carrie) Fisher in July 2006 on the field at KeySpan Park in Brooklyn, after a Brooklyn Cyclones game. The two had met while working at Radio Disney in Boston, and Kerpen was then an eighth-grade teacher in Queens. Unable to afford the wedding they wanted, they persuaded companies including 1-800-Flowers.com and Entenmann's to cover much of the cost in return for publicity. The New York Times put the value of the wedding at $100,000, of which the couple paid $25,000, and CBS News reported that they donated $20,000 to the David Wright Foundation. Gersh Kuntzman of The Brooklyn Paper wrote that a sponsor video shown on the stadium screen "did elicit a groan from the sellout crowd".

== Likeable Media ==
After their 2006 wedding, Dave and Carrie Kerpen started a company called Likeable Media that operated in the social media and word-of-mouth marketing space. Two of the wedding's sponsors, 1-800-Flowers.com and Entenmann's, became its clients. It was based in New York City and Kerpen was the chief executive. The technology company 10Pearls acquired Likeable in 2021.

== Publications and critical reception ==
Kerpen wrote two books under the Likeable name, both published by McGraw-Hill. Likeable Social Media set out 18 concepts for businesses using social media, with case studies of companies applying them. Likeable Business set out 11 goals for organizations, among them listening, storytelling, authenticity, transparency, responsiveness and gratefulness. He also wrote about eleven principles of what he called likeable leadership.

=== The Art of People ===
Linda White, writing in the Toronto Sun, summarized the 2016 book as 53 "bite-sized skills" in 11 categories. A Recruiter.com interview carried by Fox Business gave one of its main ideas as the claim that the people who succeed are those with the best people skills, "not the cutthroat competitive types". Helena Escalante, reviewing it for the New York Public Library's blog, called it "a very easy and enjoyable read" built from stories of Kerpen's life and business career, and wrote that she admired the author.

=== Get Over Yourself ===
AudioFile magazine, reviewing the audiobook in 2024, said it draws on Kerpen's experience of starting and growing several businesses and argues that leaders should concentrate on the most important matters and delegate the rest. The reviewer described his narration as "spotty" at first, with pauses that made some sentences hard to follow.

== Politics ==
In 2008 Kerpen, then living in Little Neck, Queens, was a candidate for a New York City Council seat. He later served on the Port Washington Board of Education. In February 2025, he announced his candidacy as a Democrat for supervisor of the Town of North Hempstead, campaigning on revitalizing downtowns, government efficiency and a more "likable" town government. In the November 2025 election, the incumbent, Jennifer DeSena, was re-elected with 55.62 percent of the vote.

== Personal life ==
As of 2025, Kerpen had lived in Port Washington, New York, for 16 years with his wife, Carrie Kerpen. On July 8, 2026, their 20th wedding anniversary, the couple officiated a vow renewal ceremony for more than a dozen couples at Maimonides Park in Brooklyn where they had married.
