= Love Island Sweden =

Swedish dating reality series

Love Island Sweden (Swedish: Love Island Sverige) is the Swedish version of Love Island. produced by ITV Studios Sweden. The series premiered on 19 August 2018 and is broadcast on TV4 and TV4 Play. From Season 4 onwards, episodes have also aired on Sjuan. The series was originally filmed in Corfu, Greece for Seasons 1 and 2. Seasons 3 through 5 have been filmed in Cyprus. Through app voting the viewers can vote on which contestants should date each other and who has to leave the Love Island Villa over a six-week filming period.

The series went on an extended hiatus after its second season in 2019, returning only in January 2023 with a third season after a gap of more than three years.

== Series overview ==
| Season | Islanders | Days | Episodes | Host | Originally Aired | | Winners | Runners-up |
| Season | Islanders | Days | Episodes | Host | Season premiere | Season finale | Winners | Runners-up |
|---|---|---|---|---|---|---|---|---|
| 1 | 26 | 43 | 42 | Malin Stenbäck | August 19, 2018 | September 29, 2018 | Jacob Olsson & Victoria Eklund Gustafsson | Johan Lundin & Sandra Gonzalez |
| 2 | 33 | 50 | 48 | Malin Gramer | August 19, 2019 | October 6, 2019 | Simon Dannert & Sofia Jenks | Jimmy Wallin & Lisa Crafoord |
| 3 | 28 | 53 | 49 | Julia Franzén | January 23, 2023 | March 12, 2023 | Adrian Podde & Celine Axman | Emil Renmarker & Frida Hartman |
| 4 | 30 | 35 | 32 | Johanna Nordström | January 27, 2025 | March 20, 2025 | Emil Renmarker & Olivia Svensson | Andrew Palm & Wilma Tillander |
