= Paradise Hotel =

American television program

- Genre: Reality
- Created by: Howard Davidson & Phil Roberts
- Presented by: Amanda Byram; Kristin Cavallari
- Narrated by: Mark Thompson
- Theme music composer: Eddie Money
- Opening theme: "Two Tickets to Paradise" (seasons 1–2); "Paradise" (season 3)
- Country of origin: United States
- Original language: English
- No. of seasons: 3
- No. of episodes: 54

Production
- Running time: 45 minutes
- Production company: Mentorn

Original release
- Network: Fox; MyNetworkTV; Fox Reality Channel
- Release: June 18, 2003 – June 6, 2019

Related
- Paradise Hotel (franchise)

Paradise Hotel is an American reality television program. In the show, a group of singles live in a luxurious hotel resort, competing to see who can stay in the hotel the longest. Each week, the contestants pair off into couples, and must share a hotel room together. One person is left over, and he or she must either pair up in the following episode, or leave the hotel to be replaced by a new contestant. The format was created by Mentorn, a British production company, which has produced various versions of the show around the world.

The show premiered on Fox in 2003, and was hosted by Amanda Byram. A second season, also hosted by Byram, was broadcast on MyNetworkTV and Fox Reality Channel in 2008. Fox revived Paradise Hotel in 2019, with new host Kristin Cavallari, but Fox cancelled the series again in August 2019.

== Episodes ==
=== Series overview ===
| Season | Episodes | Originally released | | |
| Season | Episodes | First released | Last released | Network |
|---|---|---|---|---|
| 1 | 30 | June 18, 2003 | October 1, 2003 | Fox |
| 2 | 16 + 1 special | February 4, 2008 | May 26, 2008 | Fox Reality Channel; MyNetworkTV |
| 3 | 6 | May 9, 2019 | June 6, 2019 | Fox |

=== Season 1 (2003) ===
Paradise Hotel
- Season 1
- Hosted by: Amanda Byram
- No. of housemates: 20
- Winners: Charla, Keith
- Runners-up: Dave, Tara
- No. of episodes: 30

Release
- Original network: Fox

The first season of Paradise Hotel, hosted by Amanda Byram, aired on Fox from June 18 to October 1, 2003, and consists of thirty episodes. The winners of the first season were Charla Pihlstrom and Keith Cuda, with Dave Kerpen and Tara Gerard finishing as runners-up. Charla and Keith had to decide whether to split their $250,000 prize with their respective partners – Keith decided to share his winnings with Tara, while Charla chose to keep the money for herself and give Dave nothing.

| No. overall | No. in season | Title | Directed by | Original release date | U.S. viewers (millions) |
|---|---|---|---|---|---|
| 1 | 1 | "Episode 1" | Kent Weed | June 18, 2003 | N/A |
| 2 | 2 | "Episode 2" | Kent Weed | June 23, 2003 | N/A |
| 3 | 3 | "Episode 3" | Kent Weed | June 25, 2003 | N/A |
| 4 | 4 | "Episode 4" | Kent Weed | June 30, 2003 | N/A |
| 5 | 5 | "Episode 5" | Kent Weed | July 2, 2003 | N/A |
| 6 | 6 | "Episode 6" | Kent Weed | July 7, 2003 | N/A |
| 7 | 7 | "Episode 7" | Kent Weed | July 9, 2003 | N/A |
| 8 | 8 | "Episode 8" | Kent Weed | July 14, 2003 | N/A |
| 9 | 9 | "Episode 9" | Kent Weed | July 16, 2003 | N/A |
| 10 | 10 | "Episode 10" | Kent Weed | July 22, 2003 | N/A |
| 11 | 11 | "Episode 11" | Kent Weed | July 23, 2003 | N/A |
| 12 | 12 | "Episode 12" | Kent Weed | July 29, 2003 | N/A |
| 13 | 13 | "Episode 13" | Kent Weed | July 30, 2003 | N/A |
| 14 | 14 | "Episode 14" | Kent Weed | August 4, 2003 | N/A |
| 15 | 15 | "Episode 15" | Kent Weed | August 11, 2003 | N/A |
| 16 | 16 | "Episode 16" | Kent Weed | August 13, 2003 | N/A |
| 17 | 17 | "Episode 17" | Kent Weed | August 18, 2003 | N/A |
| 18 | 18 | "Episode 18" | Kent Weed | August 20, 2003 | N/A |
| 19 | 19 | "Episode 19" | Kent Weed | August 25, 2003 | N/A |
| 20 | 20 | "Episode 20" | Kent Weed | August 27, 2003 | N/A |
| 21 | 21 | "Episode 21" | Kent Weed | September 1, 2003 | N/A |
| 22 | 22 | "Episode 22" | Kent Weed | September 3, 2003 | N/A |
| 23 | 23 | "Episode 23" | Kent Weed | September 8, 2003 | N/A |
| 24 | 24 | "Episode 24" | Kent Weed | September 10, 2003 | N/A |
| 25 | 25 | "Episode 25" | Kent Weed | September 15, 2003 | N/A |
| 26 | 26 | "Episode 26" | Kent Weed | September 17, 2003 | N/A |
| 27 | 27 | "Episode 27" | Kent Weed | September 23, 2003 | N/A |
| 28 | 28 | "Episode 28" | Kent Weed | September 23, 2003 | N/A |
| 29 | 29 | "Episode 29" | Kent Weed | October 1, 2003 | N/A |
| 30 | 30 | "Episode 30" | Kent Weed | October 1, 2003 | N/A |

=== Season 2 (2008) ===
Paradise Hotel
- Season 2
- Hosted by: Amanda Byram
- No. of housemates: 17
- Winners: Zack, Stephanie
- Runners-up: Tidisha, Ryan
- No. of episodes: 16 + 1 special

Release
- Original network: Fox Reality Channel; MyNetworkTV

A second season, titled Paradise Hotel 2, began airing on February 4, 2008, on the Fox-owned networks MyNetworkTV and Fox Reality Channel. It consists of sixteen episodes and a reunion special. Amanda Byram returned as host, and Mark Thompson returned as announcer.

New episodes aired on MyNetworkTV Monday nights at 9 p.m., and repeated Saturday nights at 9 p.m. Fox Reality Channel aired more explicit, TV-MA versions of the episodes, at 1 a.m. on the same night that they premiered on MyNetworkTV, and repeated these episodes throughout the following week.

Stephanie and Zack were the winners, but the runners-up, Tidisha and Ryan, were given the responsibility of choosing only one member of the winning couple to claim the "ultimate prize". They chose Zack, who was awarded $200,000. He chose to share $20,000 with Tidisha and $90,000 with Stephanie, keeping the remaining $90,000 for himself.

| No. overall | No. in season | Title | Directed by | Original release date | U.S. viewers (millions) |
|---|---|---|---|---|---|
| 31 | 1 | "The Return of Paradise Hotel" | Stephen Lentini | February 4, 2008 | N/A |
| 32 | 2 | "The First Elimination Ceremony" | Stephen Lentini | February 11, 2008 | N/A |
| 33 | 3 | "The First New Guest" | Stephen Lentini | February 18, 2008 | N/A |
| 34 | 4 | "Finger Painting" | Stephen Lentini | February 25, 2008 | N/A |
| 35 | 5 | "The Blonde Bombshell" | Stephen Lentini | March 3, 2008 | N/A |
| 36 | 6 | "Pandora's Box Blows Up" | Stephen Lentini | March 10, 2008 | N/A |
| 37 | 7 | "The Secretary of Defense" | Stephen Lentini | March 17, 2008 | N/A |
| 38 | 8 | "Are You Calling Me a Liar?" | Stephen Lentini | March 24, 2008 | N/A |
| 39 | 9 | "Paradise Confidential" | Stephen Lentini | March 31, 2008 | N/A |
| 40 | 10 | "A Tearful Farewell" | Stephen Lentini | April 7, 2008 | N/A |
| 41 | 11 | "Blast From The Past" | Stephen Lentini | April 14, 2008 | N/A |
| 42 | 12 | "High Stakes in Paradise" | Stephen Lentini | April 21, 2008 | N/A |
| 43 | 13 | "The Return of Raheim" | Stephen Lentini | April 28, 2008 | N/A |
| 44 | 14 | "Odd Man Out" | Stephen Lentini | May 5, 2008 | N/A |
| 45 | 15 | "The Ultimate Power" | Stephen Lentini | May 12, 2008 | N/A |
| 46 | 16 | "Season Finale" | Stephen Lentini | May 19, 2008 | N/A |
| 47 | Special | "Reunion" | Stephen Lentini | May 26, 2008 | N/A |

=== Season 3 (2019) ===
Paradise Hotel
- Season 3
- Hosted by: Kristin Cavallari
- No. of housemates: 17
- Winners: Bobby Ray, Tatum
- Runners-up: Carlos, Kaitlin
- No. of episodes: 7

Release
- Original network: Fox
- Original release: May 9 – June 6, 2019

In 2019, Fox ordered a revival of the series. Casting began in January, and Kristin Cavallari was chosen as the new host. The third season (Note: Fox, calling this season a "reinvention" of the series, designates it "Season 1".) premiered on May 9, 2019. The revival's season was truncated, with its season finale airing on June 6, 2019. The winners as chosen by a jury of the other former contestants were Bobby Ray and Tatum, beating Carlos and Kaitlin, but in the final twist, Bobby Ray chose to keep $200,000 of the prize for himself, leaving Tatum with nothing. The revival was officially canceled by Fox in August 2019.

| No. overall | No. in season | Title | Original release date | Prod. code | U.S. viewers (millions) |
|---|---|---|---|---|---|
| 48 | 1 | "Episode 1" | May 9, 2019 | 101/102 | 1.41 |
| 49 | 2 | "Episode 2" | May 13, 2019 | 103 | 1.19 |
| 50 | 3 | "Episode 3" | May 15, 2019 | 104 | 1.09 |
| 51 | 4 | "Episode 4" | May 16, 2019 | 105/106 | 1.11 |
| 52 | 5 | "Episode 5" | May 23, 2019 | 107/108 | 1.25 |
| 53 | 6 | "Episode 6" | May 30, 2019 | 109/110 | 1.47 |
| 54 | 7 | "Episode 7" | June 6, 2019 | 111/112 | 1.29 |

== International versions ==
Despite being only a modest success in the United States, the Paradise Hotel franchise has been described as "an international hit", spawning versions in eighteen countries.

== See also ==
- Forever Eden
- Love Island
- Temptation Island
- Love in the Wild
- Bachelor in Paradise
- Ex on the Beach
