= Paradise Hotel (franchise) =

International reality television franchise

- Created by: Howard Davidson and Phil Roberts
- Original work: Paradise Hotel

Films and television
- Television series: Paradise Hotel (independent international versions, see below)

Miscellaneous
- First aired: June 18, 2003; 23 years ago

Paradise Hotel is a franchise of reality television series. The series follows a group of contestants who are staying in a hotel. One contestant is eliminated each week. The franchise started with the American version, which began airing in 2003. A second season was shown in 2008, and in 2019, Paradise Hotel got a third season. In August 2019, the broadcaster of the show, Fox, cancelled it.

== Locations ==
=== Sweden ===
The first two seasons of the Swedish version of Paradise Hotel aired on TV4 in 2005, one in the spring and one in the fall. One of the contestants of season one, Sofia Hellqvist, later married the Swedish Prince Carl Philip.

A third season aired on TV6 in 2009, followed by a fourth season that started to air November 15, 2010 on TV6. Season four was the last season to be aired on TV6 as the following seasons were aired on TV3.

A fifth season started on November 18, 2013 on TV3. Aina Lesse and Jesper Johansson won, with Johansson throwing the ball at 200,000 Swedish crowns, leaving Lesse with no share of the money.

In August 2014, a sixth season of Paradise Hotel started to air. Paulina "Paow" Danielsson and Eric Hagberg won and shared the winnings of 500,000 Swedish crowns.

The following year, in August 2015, the seventh season started to air. Josefine Caarle and Robin "Mos" Andersson won and shared the winnings of 500,000 Swedish crowns.

An eight season later aired in 2016. Alex D'Rosso and Anna Bohman won and shared the winnings of 500,000 Swedish crowns.

The ninth season begun airing in the spring of 2017, Sanel Dzubur and Lisa Maria Jönsson won and shared the winnings of 500,000 Swedish crowns.

A tenth season begun airing later in the fall the same year, 2017, called ALLSTAR. Anna Pankova and Jonathan Hermansson won and shared the winnings of 500,000 Swedish crowns. Anna Pankova met another contestant, Kristian Täljeblad, at the show and they have been a couple since then, they married each other in 2020.

The following year, 2018, an eleventh season started. Jennifer Karlsson and Robin "Mos" Andersson won (This was Andersson's second time winning the show), with Andersson throwing the ball at 250,000 Swedish crowns, leaving Jennifer with no share of the money. Before the ball ceremony both winners had to write down the name of one other contestant they would share the money with if they decided to throw the ball, Andersson had written Rebecca Karlsson, Jennifer's sister.

The twelfth season aired in the spring of 2019. Hannah "HK" Klostermann and Jesper Bengtsson won, with Klostermann throwing the ball at 300,000 Swedish crowns, leaving Jesper with no share of the money. The remaining 200,000 Swedish crowns was shared among the contestants who had already dropped out earlier in the competition.

Season thirteenth aired in the fall of 2019. Marcelo Peña and Erica Lindberg won, with Peña throwing the ball at 500,000 Swedish crowns, taking home all the winnings and leaving Erica with no share of the money. Marcelo Peña and Jesper Bengtsson played hard from the beginning of the competition and with the majority of the girls on their side, calling themselves "Wolfpack". Their rivals were "FlowerGang" consisting of Adam Linard, Helen Ablatova, Jennifer Karlsson and more.

In the spring of 2020, the fourteenth season begun airing. Marcus "Mcuze" Johansson and Nicole Wennerström won, with Johansson throwing the ball at 100,000 Swedish crowns, leaving Nicole with no share of the money. The remaining 400,000 Swedish crowns was shared among the contestants who had already dropped out earlier in the competition.

During the release of the latest season, contestant Toby Johnson was thrown off the show, after sexual harassing two female contestants Jennifer Paatere and Annie Dahlberg. After the episode aired, Paatere and Dahlberg filed a police report against Johnson and if charged, he faces up to two years in prison. After this, the streaming service Viafree and Viaplay has removed the entire season from their streaming site and the series, along with swedish Ex on the Beach has been put on hiatus.

=== Denmark ===
The Danish Paradise Hotel is the most successful version of the UK format in the world. The Danish version of Paradise Hotel premiered in September 2005 and is aired on TV3.

The shows first host was Ibi Støving, she was the host from season 1, but stopped after season 3 due to pregnancy and was replaced by former contestant from season 3 Rikke Göransson.

In 2010, the sixth season was notable for introducing, contestent Amalie Szigethy, who would later become one of Denmarks biggest reality stars.

In 2011 a talkshow "Paradise After Dark" was introduced in season 7, which featured contestants from the show. It only aired one season on TV and from 2012 it was moved to Viaplay online.

In 2012 a "Reunion" season was introduced right after the eighth-season finale, which featured former contestants from previous seasons. The winner of that season was Frederik Lilja who also won the fifth season back in 2009.

Paradise Hotel has gained huge success in Denmark, with a substantial number of viewers. It has set its mark on Danish television, sparking debate about sex and alcohol in online forums and news channels, among them the main public service station in Denmark, DR.

Also many celebrities has been involved with the show, including singer and rapper Joey Moe, the music group Sukkerchok, professional boxer Patrick Nielsen, business man and former European Parliament member Klaus Riskær Pedersen, reality star Linse Kessler, professional poker player Theo Jørgensen and American socialite Paris Hilton.

After the filming of season 17, which premiered in April 2021, Rikke Göransson stepped down as host after 14 seasons and has been replaced by two new hosts; the Danish youtuber Emil Olsen and Love Island star Olivia Salo. Emil and Olivia would host one season of the original Paradise Hotel, before the series was revamped to a more woke version called "Paradise". They would host this version for two seasons, before the original Paradise Hotel format would return, and Emil stepped down as host and Olivia was rejoined by Rikke Göransson and the two would co-host the next three seasons of Paradise Hotel. After season 21, Olivia stopped as co-host, leaving Rikke as solo host once again.

In May 2022, Paradise Hotel alumni and winner of season 16 Teitur Skoubo was found guilty of raping a girl in november 2021 and was sentenced to two years in prison. As a result, season 16 of Paradise Hotel was removed from streaming, along with other reality tv shows that featured Skoubo, like season 6 of Danish Ex on the Beach. On October 26, 2022, Teitur Skoubo was declared innocent of the rape allegations in a re-trial and has been sat free.

On October 25, 2022, alumni Theis Berg Kristensen from season 11, was found guilty of raping a girl, while she was asleep. Theis Berg Kristensen has been sentenced to two years and two months in prison. As a result, Viaplay has removed season 11 from its streaming site.

Season 22 premiered in January 2026.

=== Netherlands & Belgium ===
The Dutch & Belgian version aired on the Dutch TV channel Veronica and the Belgian-Flemish TV channel VIER in September 2005.

A second season started on November 7, 2024 on Videoland (VOD service). Sjorleone and Charlotte won, with Sjorleone throwing the ball at 30,000 Euro's, leaving Charlotte with no share of the money.

=== Israel ===
The Israeli version premiered in September 2008 and aired on Channel 2 entitled מפרץ האהבה (The Bay of Love).

=== Norway ===
The first season of the Norwegian version was recorded in January and February 2009 and premiered in March on TV3. It was hosted by glamour model Triana Iglesias. Winners of the first season were Petter Pilgaard and Benedicte Valen and the prize was NOK 300,000 (about US$40,000) shared between the couple.

The second season began airing in March 2010, which was won by Tine Helene Valle and Carl Eliassen. Like Pilgaard and Valen, they shared the prize.

The third season followed up in 2011. The winners were Niklas Vindel, who was also in the finale of the second season, and Madelen Voreland Berås. They shared the prize as well.

The fourth season aired in 2012. This year Miguel Kristiansen and Vida Lill Gausemel Berge won the controversial contest, but Vida Lill dropped the ball, and won 200,000 NOK, and shared 100,000 with her former partner, Stian Thorbjørnsen. The show has begun to appear yearly on TV3.

In 2013, Tina Skovdal and Sander Kalstrup won the fifth season. Tina's partner Kristian Renè Johansen participated in the 2012 season without winning. Tina and Sander shared the money.

Aurora Gude and Nikolai Bennis won the sixth season in 2014. Aurora and Nikolai dropped the ball simultaneously, but slow motion reprise revealed that Aurora's ball hit the ground first. She won 100,000 NOK and shared 200,000 with Ann Marielle Lipinska.

The whole season of 48 episodes is recorded in January and February, and the show is aired from March to May, everyday from Monday through Thursday with about 45 minutes per episode. Every episode can be watched for free on TV3s own site called TV3 Play.

In January 2022, the winner of the latest season Markus Nikolai Grønberg was found guilty of raping a child, a fourteen year old girl. Markus Nikolai Grønberg was sentenced to four years and five months in prison and must pay 170,000 Norwegian kroner in compensation to the victim. The entire season has been removed from streaming.

=== Russia ===
In the Russian version, called "Kanikuly v Meksike" premiered in 2011 an aired on MTV Russia. The contestants are fighting for a prize of one million rubles and during the show, the Boys and girls are in a luxury hotel in Mexico. The host of the show was popular singer and TV presenter Zhanna Friske.

In March 2012, season two of the hit show premiered. The new contestants moved into a new luxury hotel in Mexico, also hosted by Zhanna Friske. The first part of the season finished in July and the second part started with a new host Alena Vodonaeva. The final contestants from the first part moved again into a new luxury hotel in Mexico and was joined with new contestants. Also during the second part, former contestants from season one returned including notable contestants Demid Rezin and Nastya Smirnova. The size of the prize depends on the amount of money earned on tests every week. The second part of the season continued into 2013 and in January, the show got a new presenter, a popular Russian TV presenter Victoria Bonia, who is also known from the hit Russian reality show Dom-2.

In June 2013, started the third season of the Reality Show now called "Kanikuly v Meksike. Cuperigra". In this season, previous contestants from previous seasons are brought back, and are living in a luxury villa next to the beach. The contestants will participate in different challenges and tasks to add money to the winning prize. The show was opened by the famous TV producer Yana Rudkovskaya. During the show, she was replaced by popular TV presenter Tahir Mamedov.

=== Hungary ===
The Hungarian version titled "Éden Hotel" and set in Colombia premiered on March 7, 2011 on Viasat 3. The final episode was aired on May 26, where Kristóf – who dropped the "Ball of Faith" against Alíz – won 12,500,000 HUF (about US$65,000), and couple of Linda and Robi also won 12,500,000 Forints, the remaining of the jackpot.

The second Hungarian season set in Mexico premiered on March 5, 2012 again on Viasat 3. The final episode aired on May 24, where the couple of Máté and Edina completed the "Test of Faith" thus sharing the jackpot of 25,000,000 HUF. The other finalists Roland and Anikó won nothing.

The third season set in Costa Rica, it was on air on Tv2 in the spring of 2015.

=== Czech Republic & Slovakia ===
The Czech & Slovak version titled "Hotel Paradise" premiered on March 5, 2012 in Czech Republic on Prima Love and in Slovakia on TV JOJ. TV presenter in hotel was Martina Gavriely and night talkshow called "Night In Paradise" were presented Petra Poláčiková a Milan Junior Zimnikoval. Prize for the winner was €50 000. The hotel was in the Dominican Republic. The show ended on July 6, 2012 with Nela Slováková from Czech Republic as the winner.

=== Slovenia ===
The Slovenian version was launched on 7 November 2012, on Planet TV. The program is recorded in Costa Rica. The grand prize is 50,000 Euro. Maja Martina Merljak is presenter of the program. Slovenian musician Matevž Šalehar-Hamo wrote theme song called "Po jabolka v raj". The final episode was aired on 31 December 2012, where no one dropped the "Ball of Faith" and the winners, Deni Sebastian Eferl and Sara Tahirović split the grand prize.

=== Germany ===
The German version was launched in August 2019. The first episode was aired on RTL while all following episodes are available through the premium streaming service TVNOW.

=== Poland ===
After two years of preparation, the casting for the Polish version of the program, which would be filmed in Bali, Indonesia, and broadcast in the spring on TVN 7, was announced in December 2019. Klaudia El Dursi, who was previously a contestant in the eighth season of TVN's another show, Top Model, was confirmed to be the host of Hotel Paradise. The first season aired from February 24 to April 17, 2020, entirely on TVN 7, although the first episode also premiered simultaneously on the main TVN channel. Its winners were Marietta Witkowska and Krzysztof "Chris" Ducki, who together won the main prize of PLN 100,000. The season was a hit with an average viewership of 703,502. The broadcast of the second season, also filmed in Bali, was originally to start on April 20, three days after the end of the previous season, but was postponed due to the COVID-19 pandemic in Poland. A special episode aired instead, followed by an additional 12-episode series titled Hotel Paradise – Powrót z raju (transl. Hotel Paradise – Return from Paradise), which ran from April 28 to May 15, and starred the first season's contestants answering viewers' questions, commenting on moments from the season, and getting challenges. The second season eventually premiered on August 31, also simultaneously on both TVN and TVN 7, with the entire season airing on the latter. It concluded on November 19, with Beata Postek and Artur Sargsyan winning the same prize together, and an average viewership of 636,598.

The third season, filmed in Zanzibar, began airing on February 22, 2021. Two weeks earlier, Sonia Szklanowska, the female runner-up of the previous season, released the show's theme song, "Oto raj" (transl. "This Is Paradise"), for which the music video was also filmed in Zanzibar and featured other contestants from previous seasons. The season ended on June 3, with an average viewership of 650,647. Barbara Pędlowska and Krystian Ferretti reached the finals, but Ferretti threw the golden ball for the first time in the Polish edition of the program, taking the main prize for himself, but decided to share his money with Pędlowska and runners-up, Bogusława "Bibi" Brzezińska and Simon Price. The fourth season, also shot in Zanzibar, premiered on August 30 and included "Raj mi daj" (transl. "Give Me Paradise") performed by Brzezińska with Kamil Bijoś as the theme song. In the final episode aired on December 6, Sara Jezuit and Michał "Mike" Adamczak came to the end, but Jezuit threw the ball on PLN 90,000. Average viewership for this season was 509,476.

Filmed in Panama, the fifth season premiered on February 21, 2022, and ended on June 2. It featured the theme song, "Ty i ja" (transl. "You and Me"), performed by Natalia "Nana" Majos, the female runner-up of the previous season. Wiktoria Kozar and Sevag Formella won it together. Its average viewership was 428,120. The sixth season was also filmed in Panama and debuted on August 29. Its theme song was "Rajska miłość" (transl. "Paradise Love"), again performed by Majos. The season was won by Monika Schmidt and Mikołaj Grzybowski, and viewed by an average of 403,097 people. The seventh season was believed to air during the spring schedule in 2023, but this ultimately did not happen. However, it was later revealed there would be a special edition of the show titled Hotel Paradise All Stars, which debuted on May 25, 2023, and was broadcast unusually during the summer schedule. Filmed in Colombia, it featured contestants who had participated in previous regular seasons of Hotel Paradise. Among the returning participants were Kozar with Łukasz "Blondino" Książkiewicz and Miłosz Pesta, who performed the theme song, "Razem" (transl. "Together"). It culminated in the finale aired on August 11, in which Julia Skrodzka and Grzegorz Głuszcz reached the end together, but Skrodzka threw the ball and won PLN 100,000 alone. Its average viewership was 273,231. The seventh regular season, filmed in the same location, began airing on August 28. The theme song for this season was "Cały czas" (transl. "All the Time"), performed by Schmidt (as "Monika Kim"). The final episode was broadcast on November 9, in which Kornelia "Kori" Rajnerowicz and Jacek Kania won together. The season's average viewership was 340,478.

The next two seasons were filmed in Vietnam. The eighth season debuted on March 4, 2024. The theme song, "Rajski lot" (transl. "Paradise Flight"), was recorded by the previous season's contestants Łucja Janik and Marvin Kruciński. In the final episode broadcast on May 14, Agnieszka Siedlak and Jędrzej Arian were announced as the winning couple, but the prize went only to Siedlak after she threw the ball for PLN 100,000. Average viewership for the season was approximately 382,700. The ninth season ran from August 28 to November 9, with the winners being Maja Dudzińska and Wojciech Gromadzki. It achieved around 412,000 average viewership. In December, it was announced El Dursi left the show due to pregnancy and was replaced by Edyta Zając to host the next two seasons, which were filmed in Cebu, Philippines. The tenth season premiered on February 27, 2025. In the final episode broadcast on April 24, Jagoda Florczak and Adam Osiński were chosen as the winning couple. The average viewership of the season was around 392,000. The 11th season, watched by an average of 512,000 viewers, was broadcast between September 1 and October 28, and its winners were Agata Weiss and Jakub Krajewski. A compilation of many scenes from this season was released in two special episodes titled Hotel Paradise – Chaos w raju (transl. Hotel Paradise – Chaos in Paradise), which came out on December 25 and 26.

Seasons 12 and 13 were filmed in Thailand. The main prize had been increased, for the first time in the show's history, to PLN 200,000. The 12th season aired between March 2 and May 21, 2026, with Zając as the host and an average viewership of 392,000. The winners were Dominika Leśniewska and Marcel Machciński. The following season premiered on August 29; the first two episodes were broadcast simultaneously on TVN 7 and the main TVN channel, the first time the premiere took place on both channels after the second season. El Dursi returned as host at the start of the season, but left midway through to serve as a mentor on Top Model, with Zając stepping in to take over as the permanent host. Even before the 13th season aired, two further seasons were confirmed; filming for these is scheduled for the fall (rather than the winter, as with previous seasons), while the broadcasts are planned for the spring and fall of the next year. The 14th season is filmed in the Dominican Republic.

== International versions ==
Currently airing
An upcoming season
Status unknown
No longer airing

Country/Region	Official name	Network(s)	Winner(s)	Presenter(s)
Belgium; Netherlands	Paradise Hotel	Veronica; VT4	Season 1, 2005: Jimmy	Hans Otten; Tanja Jess
Czech Republic; Slovakia	Hotel Paradise	Prima Love; TV JOJ	Season 1, 2012: Nela Slováková	Martina Gavriely; Milan Zimnýkoval
Denmark; Faroe Islands	Paradise Hotel	TV3 (1–15, 19–present); Viaplay (8–present)	Season 1, 2005: Benjamin Knudsen; Season 2, 2006: Linda Algaard; Season 3, 2007: Camilla Sys Thygesen; Season 4, 2008: Diana Jeanett Nielsen & Nick Zitouni; Season 5, 2009: Frederik Lilja & Line Sofie Hansen; Season 6, 2010: Peter Birch & Cecilie Ankjær Sørensen; Season 7, 2011: Nick Bisgaard Jakobsen; Season 8, 2012: Julian Damhus & Tina Maria Hansen; Season 9, 2013: Nicolas Butler; Season 10, 2014: Martin Dengsø; Season 11, 2015: Anders Meyer & Monique von Appen; Season 12, 2016: Mathias With Jensen; Season 13, 2017: Anders Vittrup Schultz & Simone Hvenegaard Nielsen; Season 14, 2018: Lenny Pihl Christensen; Season 15, 2019: Teitur Skoubo Juliansson; Season 16, 2020: Jonas Daniel Westh Ptak; Season 17, 2021: Anne-Sofie Grundahl Krab; Season 18, 2021: David Jarsbo; Season 19, 2023–2024: Vivi Bach; Season 20, 2024: Nadia Emilia Abrahamsen; Season 21, 2025: Christel Trubka & Sean Bornkessel; Season 22, 2026: Simon Rihan; Season 23, 2027: Upcoming season	Ibi Makienok (1–3); Rikke Göransson (4–17, 19–present); Olivia Salo (18–21); Emil Olsen (18)
Denmark; Faroe Islands	Paradise Hotel Reunion	TV3; Viaplay	Season 1, 2012: Frederik Lilja	Rikke Göransson
Denmark; Faroe Islands	Paradise	Viaplay	Season 1, 2022: Zilas Mølgaard Gregersen & Louise Hjort Danielsen; Season 2, 2022–2023: Kristine Methea Baltzer & Freya Anna Lind Sollid	Olivia Salo; Emil Olsen
Finland	Paratiisihotelli Suomi	Nelonen	Season 1, 2015: Viivi Saaristo & Christian Nygård; Season 2, 2017: Henri "HP" Pirkkalainen; Season 3, 2021: Jemina Lehto & Antti	Sara Sieppi (1–2); Alma Hätönen (3)
Germany	Paradise Hotel	TVNOW Premium	Season 1, 2019: Vanessa Kurth & Mario Kleinermanns; Season 2, 2020: Jan Büttgen & Nikita Woitas	Vanessa Meisinger (1); Angela Finger-Erben (2)
Hungary	Éden Hotel	Viasat 3 (1–2); TV2 (3); RTL (4); RTL+ (4)	Season 1, 2011: Kristóf Bárdi; Season 2, 2012: Edina Gacs & Máté Major; Season 3, 2015: Barbara Meiczinger & Dániel "Loki" Titz; Season 4, 2023–2024: Adrienn Oldi & Arnold Jakab	Éva Horváth (1–2); Krisztián Berki (3); Dávid Miller (4)
Israel	מפרץ האהבה; Mifratz Ha'ahava	Channel 2	Season 1, 2008: Liron Maimon & Moran Atar	Ilanit Levi
Netherlands	Paradise Hotel	Videoland	Season 1, 2024: Johan "Sjorleone" Patrick; Season 2, 2025–2026: Mert Cara	Valerio Zeno
Norway	Paradise Hotel (1–15, 18–present); Paradise (16–17)	TV3	Season 1, 2009: Petter Pilgaard & Benedicte Valen; Season 2, 2010: Tine Helene Valle & Carl Eliassen; Season 3, 2011: Madelen Berås & Niklas Vindel; Season 4, 2012: Miguel Kristiansen & Vida Lill Gausemel Berge; Season 5, 2013: Sander Johansen Kalstrup & Tina Caroline Skovdal; Season 6, 2014: Nicolai Bennis & Aurora Gude; Season 7, 2015: Martine Sjøhaug & Pierre Louis Olsson; Season 8, 2016: Øystein Myhren Storaa & Eileen Eriksen; Season 9, 2017: Kevin René Gustavsson & Martine Lunde; Season 10, 2018: Julie Grindbakken & Leo Faa; Season 11, 2019: Marthe Elise Brenne & Adrian Sjursen Ådland; Season 12, 2020: Karl Fredrik Førli & Yasmine San Miguel Moussaoui; Season 13, 2020: Bettina Buchanan & Mohamed "Simo" Elh'Babi; Season 14, 2021: Victoria Lovise Langfjell & Markus Nikolai Grønberg; Season 15, 2021: Sandra Bury & Mathias Elliot Soltvedt; Season 16, 2022: Jo Petter Helstad & Annika Løland; Season 17, 2023: Amalie Einan & Hannah Ødegaard; Season 18, 2024: Johannes Magnussen & Helin Moe; Season 19, 2025: Rannveig Pettersen & Tobias Andersen; Season 20, 2026: Johannes Magnussen & Emma Møllerud; Season 21, 2027: Upcoming season	Triana Iglesias (1–15, 18–present); Tix (16–18); Martine Lunde (19–present)
Poland	Hotel Paradise	TVN 7; Player; HBO Max (9–present)	Season 1, 2020: Marietta Witkowska & Krzysztof "Chris" Ducki; Season 2, 2020: Beata Postek & Artur Sargsyan; Season 3, 2021: Krystian Ferretti; Season 4, 2021: Sara Jezuit; Season 5, 2022: Wiktoria Kozar & Sevag Formella; Season 6, 2022: Monika Schmidt & Mikołaj Grzybowski; Season 7, 2023: Kornelia "Kori" Rajnerowicz & Jacek Kania; Season 8, 2024: Agnieszka Siedlak; Season 9, 2024: Maja Dudzińska & Wojciech Gromadzki; Season 10, 2025: Jagoda "Jadzia" Florczak & Adam Osiński; Season 11, 2025: Agata Weiss & Jakub Krajewski; Season 12, 2026: Dominika Leśniewska & Marcel Machciński; Season 13, 2026: Current season; Season 14, 2027: Upcoming season; Season 15, 2027: Upcoming season	Klaudia El Dursi (1–9, 13); Edyta Zając (10–present)
Poland	Hotel Paradise All Stars	TVN 7; Player	Season 1, 2023: Julia Skrodzka	Klaudia El Dursi
Russia	Каникулы в Мексике; Kanikuly v Meksike	MTV Russia	Season 1, 2011: Diana Makieva & Roman Nikitin; Season 2, 2012–2013: Katya Sukhoborova & Val Nikolsky	Jeanna Friske (1–2); Victoria Bonya (2)
Russia	Каникулы в Мексике. Суперигра; Kanikuly v Meksike. Superigra	Friday!	Season 1, 2013: Demid Rezin	Yana Rudkovskaya; Tahir Mamedov
Slovenia	Paradise Hotel Slovenija	Planet TV	Season 1, 2012: Deni Sebastian Eferl & Sara Tahirović	Maja Martina Merljak
Sweden	Paradise Hotel	TV4 (1–2); TV6 (3–4); TV3 (5–present)	Season 1, 2005: Marwan "Marre" Hitti; Season 2, 2005: Jennie Bramer & Jim Roslund; Season 3, 2009: Jackie Ferm & Patrik Bergholm; Season 4, 2010: Emanuel Wäsström; Season 5, 2013–14: Jesper "Jeppe" Johansson & Aina Lesse; Season 6, 2014: Paulina Danielsson & Eric Hagberg; Season 7, 2015: Robin "Mos" Andersson & Josefine Caarle; Season 8, 2016: Alexander D'Rosso & Anna Bohman; Season 9, 2017: Sanel Dzubur & Lisa Maria Jönsson; Season 10, 2017: Jonathan Hermansson & Anna Pankova; Season 11, 2018: Robin "Mos" Andersson & Jennifer Karlsson; Season 12, 2019: Jesper Bengtsson & Hannah "HK" Klostermann; Season 13, 2019: Marcelo Esteban Peña & Erica Lindberg; Season 14, 2020: Marcus "Mcuze" Johansson & Nicole Wennerström Larsson; Season 15, 2020: Sebastian Månsson & Diana Moseni; Season 16, 2021: Ikenna "Ike" Abika & Moa Lindgren; Season 17, 2022: Gabriella "Bella" Andersson; Season 18, 2024: Amanda Fransson & Emil Renmarker; Season 19, 2025: Ruslan Sultanov & Moa Melin; Season 20, 2026: Johannes Magnussen & Felicia Hallgren	Josefin Crafoord (1–2); Tilde Fröling (3–4); Alex Schulman (4); Malin Gramer (5–9); Rebecca Simonsson (8–14, 18); Nicole Falciani (15–17); Tone Sekelius (18–present)
Sweden	Paradise	TV3	Season 1, 2022–2023: Linnéa Sagnil & Pedro Lima; Season 2, 2024: Oliver Gonzales & Fatou Sillah	Tone Sekelius
United States	Paradise Hotel	Fox (1, 3); Fox Reality Channel (2); MyNetworkTV (2)	Season 1, 2003: Charla & Keith; Season 2, 2008: Zack; Season 3, 2019: Bobby Ray	Amanda Byram (1–2); Kristin Cavallari (3)
