= Triana Iglesias =

Norwegian model and TV host

Triana Iglesias Holten
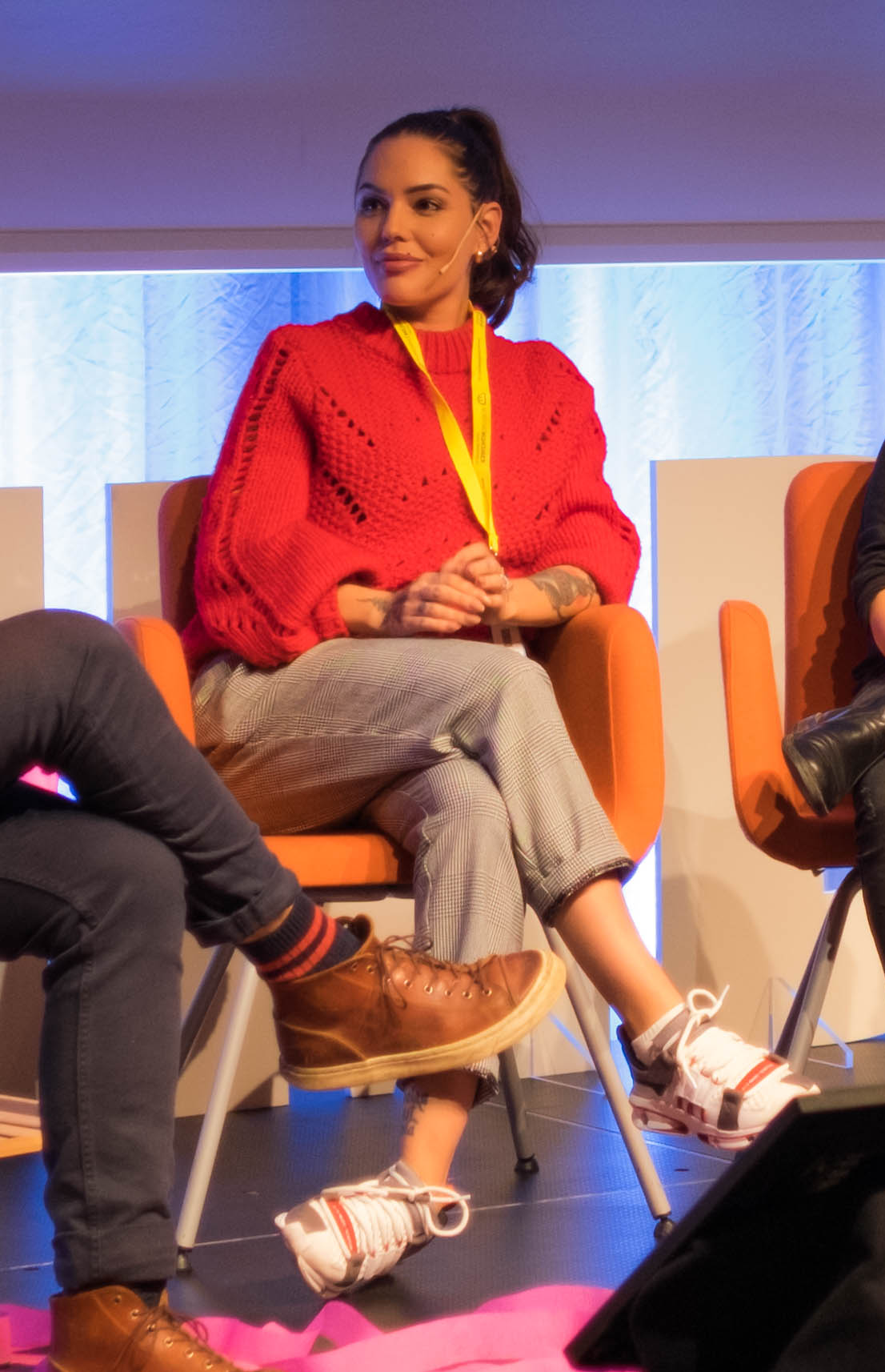
- Iglesias in 2018
- Born: 19 March 1982 (age 43); Oslo, Norway
- Occupation(s): Model, burlesque artist, actress, TV presenter, DJ
- Partner: Mikael Gabriel (fiancé)
- Website: http://www.trianaiglesias.com/

Triana Iglesias Holten (born 19 March 1982) is a Norwegian model and burlesque artist, of Norwegian and Spanish descent. She has been a cover girl of FHM and Slitz and has also appeared on the cover of Playboy.

She has been on Playboy covers in the US, Venezuela, Mexico, Spain, Poland, Lithuania & Ukraine, and a Playboy Playmate in several countries including Brazil, Germany, France, Poland, Hungary and Malta. Playboy chose Triana Iglesias to honour Playboy Spain's 30th anniversary, as their anniversary Playmate.

She began her career at the age of 13 hosting the Norwegian children's show Midt i smørøyet (1987–1999), featured on the soap opera Venner og fiender (1998–1999), appeared in a number of stage plays and guest-starred on several television shows such as Masterchef and Praksisjobben (Dirty Jobs). She also came fourth on Dancing with the Stars in Norway in November 2009.

In addition to her TV performances, she is also known for her roles in Tina & Bettina - The Movie (2012) and Kill Buljo 2 (2013).

She has also appeared in several music videos for Norwegian bands, including the group Madcon. She has worked for a Norwegian television channel as a presenter and reporter, presenting Paradise Hotel in Norway.
