= Furillen =

Island east of Gotland, Sweden

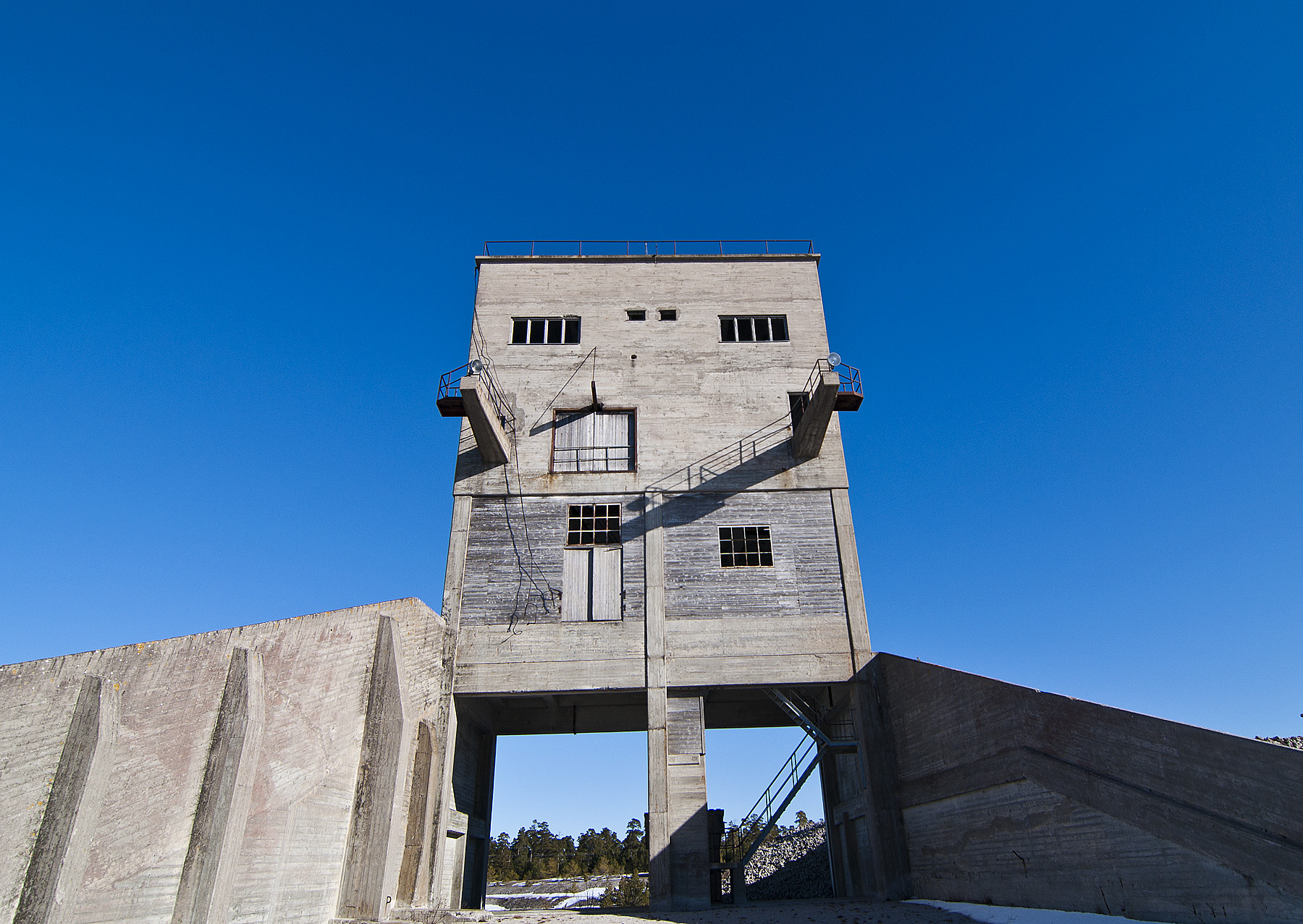
- The old limestone factory building on Furillen

- Location within Gotland

Geography
- Location: Baltic Sea
- Coordinates: 57°46′7″N 19°0′55″E
- Area: 4 km^{2} (1.5 sq mi)
- Length: 5.3 km (3.29 mi)
- Width: 2 km (1.2 mi)

Administration
- Sweden

Additional information
- Official website: www.furillen.com

Furillen (older spelling Furilden) is an island in Rute on the northeast coast of Gotland, Sweden. For most of the 20th century, there was a limestone industry on the island until it was closed to the public by the Swedish military in the 1970s–90s, when radar installations became operational. The north part of Furillen is a nature reserve and a Natura 2000 area.

== Etymology ==
The old name "Furilden", is said to date to the Middle Ages, when fire ravaged the forests of northern Gotland, (Note: "Fyr" is a Swedish word having to do with fire.) including those on Furillen. Another interpretation is that the prefix "Fur" simply refers to the pines on the island as one of the Swedish words for "pine" is fur or fura, (Note: "Fur" or "Fura" is an alternative Swedish word for "tall", meaning pine (Pinus silvestris).) making the meaning "island with the pine forest".

== Geography ==
Furillen is an island off the northeast coast of Gotland. With an area of 4 km^{2} (1.5 mi^{2}), it is the third largest island under the jurisdiction of Gotland. (Note: The largest is Fårö and the second is Gotska Sandön.) A bridge and a narrow isthmus, wide enough for a road, connects the island to the coast of Gotland adjacent to the fishing village of Lergrav. At the beginning of the 21st century, the narrow strait separating Furillen from the main island of Gotland, had become clogged by silt and overgrown with reeds. In 2015, a 1,100 m (3,600 ft) long canal was cleared and Furillen was restored to its island status.

There are two smaller islands between the main island of Gotland and Furillen, the Klaasen and the Fjaugen. North of Furillen is a third island, Skenholmen.

== History ==
Limestone quarries were dug on the island in 1908 by the German company Possehl as the basis of a limestone industry. The industry closed down in the 1970s, after which the Swedish military took over the island and it became a military compound off limits to the public. The R130 Katten and R236 Bonsen radar stations were placed on the island. The stations were decommissioned in the late 1990s, but the Swedish military still operate smaller installations on Furillen.

=== Fabriken Furillen ===
Since 2000, the old factory buildings from the limestone industry have been used as hotel and conference venues by the Fabriken Furillen (the Furillen Factory) company, owned by photographer and entrepreneur Johan Hellström. He started out using the abandoned factory and its surroundings as a backdrop for commercials and rock videos. In 1999, he bought the whole complex of 500 hectares (1,200 acres) and converted it into a minimalistic hotel and restaurant. Hellström collaborated with Scandinavian designers and architects such as Andreas Forsberg, Mattias Ljunggren, Mats Theselius and Orrefors glassworks.

A recording studio close to one of the beaches on the island was planned as part of the project to make Furillen into a center for art and design. The studio project was headed by Björn Ulvaeus. In 2008–10, the permit for the studio was being discussed in several administrative instances. Permission to build the studio was finally denied due to an objection made by the Swedish Environmental Protection Agency regarding the preservation of the beaches on Furillen in their natural state.

== Nature reserve ==
In December 1995, a nature reserve with an area of 1.3 km^{2} (0.50 mi^{2}), was established on the north part of Furillen. It was also designated as a Natura 2000 area. Two thirds of the reserve is covered with pine forest, this area is also intersected by some marshlands. The northeast part of the reserve is a meadow close to the water, completely void of trees and shrubs, with a varied birdlife. Among the species that can be seen here are greylag goose, common shelduck, eurasian curlew, northern lapwing, common redshank and eurasian hobby.

== Gallery ==
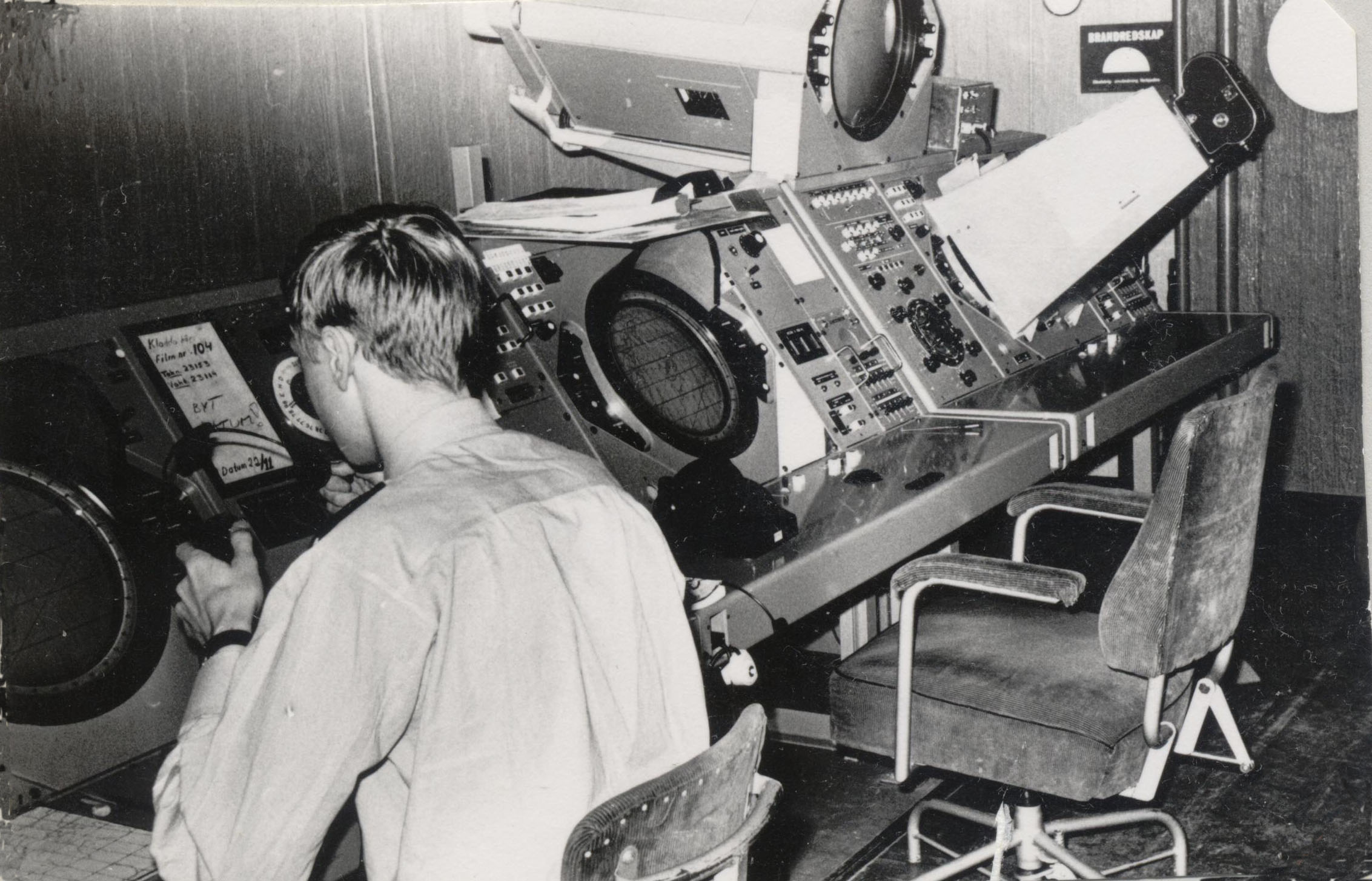
The radar station on Furillen in 1967

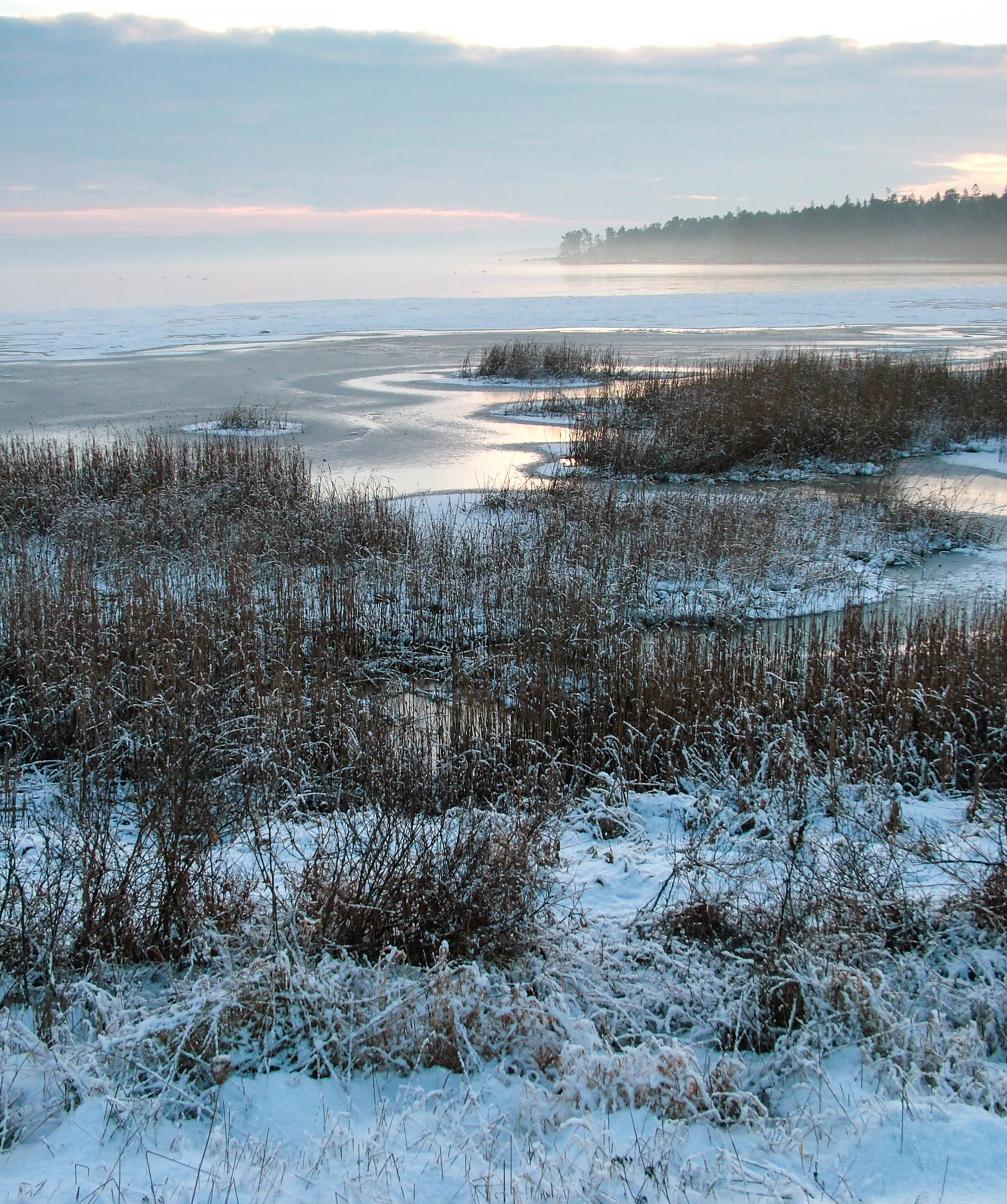
The isthmus to Furillen

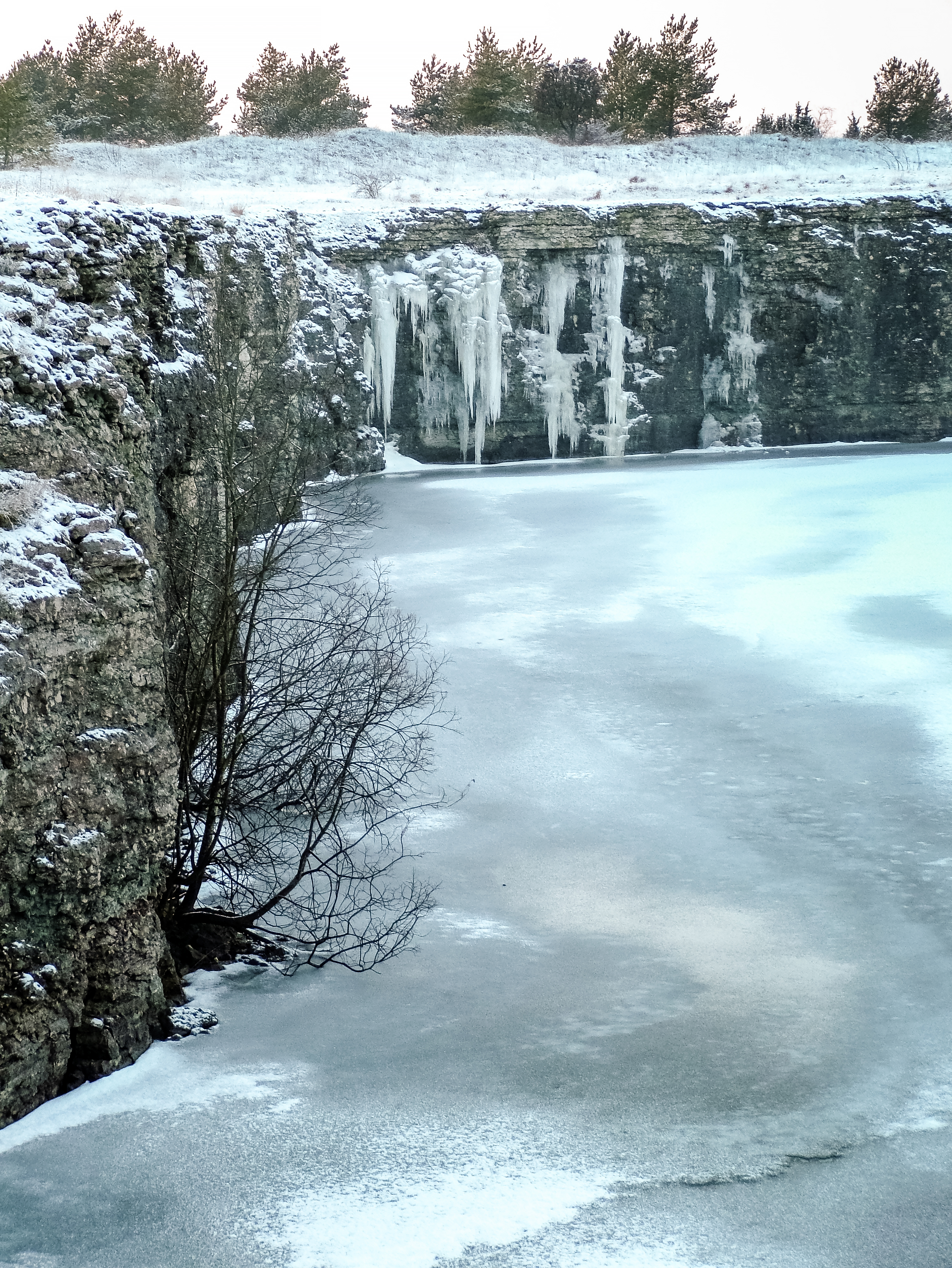
One of the limestone quarries on Furillen

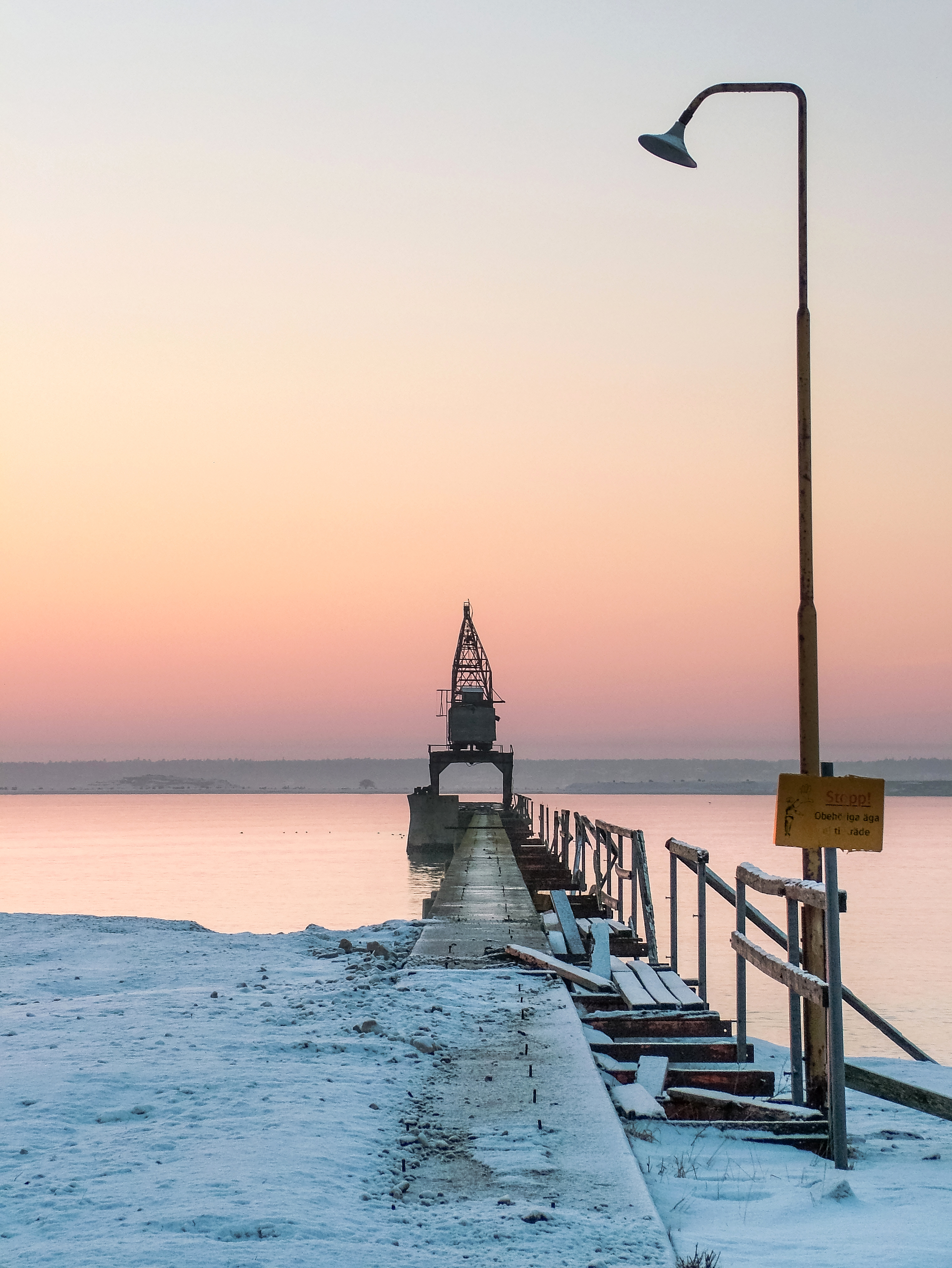
The old loading pier

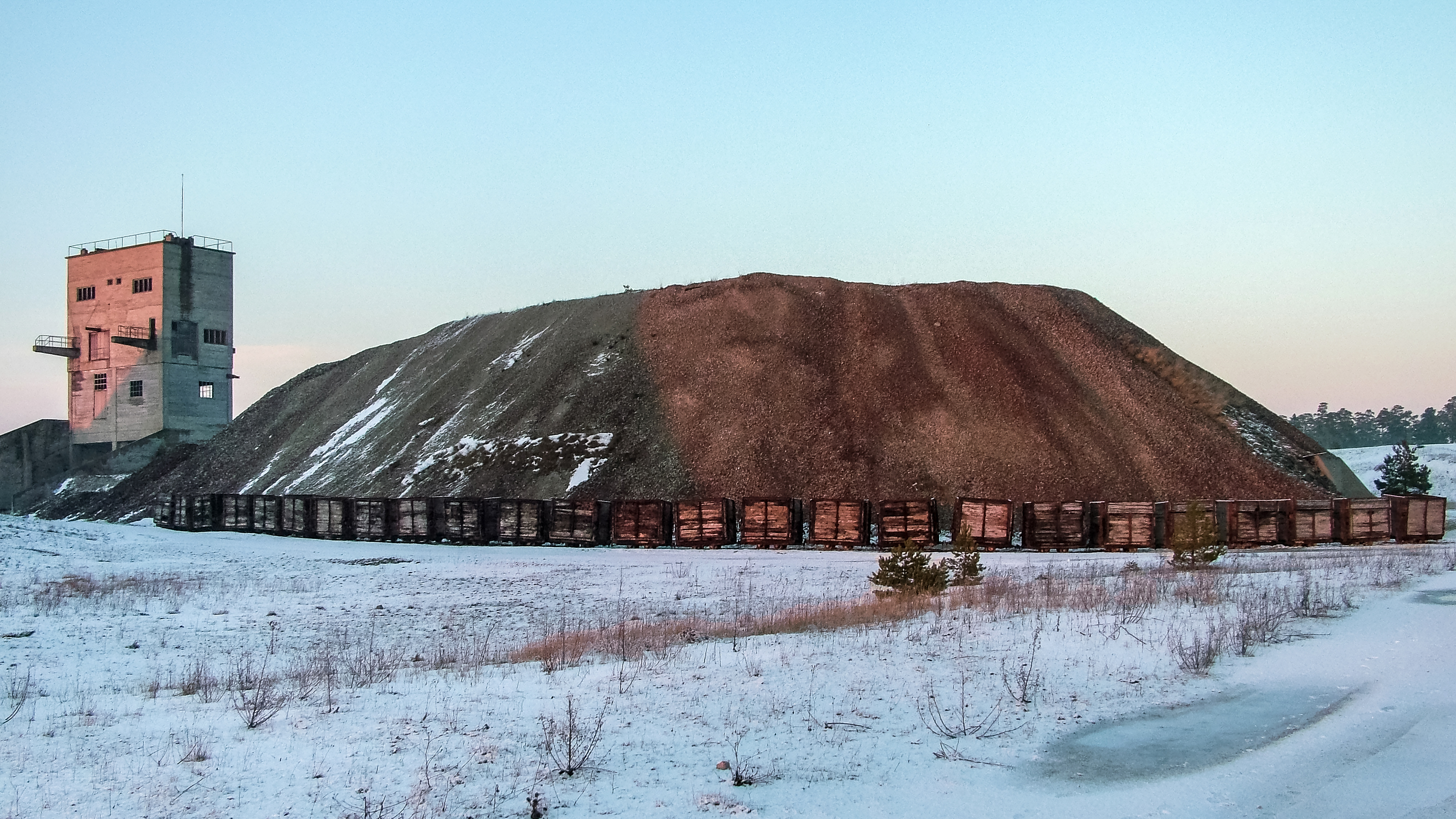
Limestone mound and the abandoned quarry carts
