= Farmen 2024 (Sweden) =

- Season 17
- Presented by: Anna Brolin
- No. of days: 54
- No. of contestants: 19
- Winner: Levin Larsson
- Runner-up: Cornelia Nordensson
- Location: Brandsjön, Vaggeryd, Sweden

Release
- Original network: TV4
- Original release: January 7 – March 17, 2024

Season chronology
- ← Previous; Farmen 2023 Next → Farmen 2025

Farmen 2024 (The Farm 2024) is the seventeenth season of the Swedish reality television series Farmen. 19 Swedes from across Sweden live on the farm like it was 100 years prior and compete in tasks to earn money for shopping, animals, tools for the farm, etc. Each week a duel takes place where one contestant is eliminated. In the finals, the final two compete in a final duel where the winners walks away with 500,000 kr. and the title of Farmen 2024. Anna Brolin continued as host while Hans Wincent continued as Farm mentor. The season premiered on 7 January 2024 on TV4. The season concluded on 17 March 2024 where former contestant Levin Larsson won against fellow Farmen alumni Cornelia Nordensson in the final challenge to win the grand prize and be proclaimed the winner of Farmen 2024.

== Finishing order ==
(age are stated at time of competition)

Contestant	Age	Residence	Entered	Exited	Status	Finish
Per Eriksson	27	Växjö	Day 1	Day 6	Left Competition; Day 6	19th
Desirée Nilsson	28	Stockholm	Day 1	Day 9	Left Competition; Day 9	18th
Yorgo Skulis	40	Staffanstorp	Day 1	Day 11	Left Competition; Day 11	17th
Alessia Santalucia	28	Rosersberg	Day 1	Day 11	1st Evicted; Day 11	16th
Ciro Cucarano	58	Farsta	Day 1	Day 16	2nd Evicted; Day 16	15th
Andreas Larsson	32	Mellbystrand	Day 1	Day 21	3rd Evicted; Day 21	14th
Anna Billberg	58	Västerhaninge	Day 1	Day 26	4th Evicted; Day 26	13th
Martina Fransson	36	Sävsjö	Day 1	Day 29	Medically Evacuated; Day 29	12th
Jennifer Valencia	31	Uttran	Day 1	Day 33	5th Evicted; Day 33	11th
Desirée Sjögren	49	Torsåker	Day 1	Day 39	6th Evicted; Day 39	10th
Ronja Lindholm	25	Skärblacka	Day 1	Day 44	7th Evicted; Day 44	9th
Magnus Samulesson	48	Gothenburg	Day 1	Day 44	8th Evicted; Day 44	8th
Cornelia Gyllborg	28	Saltsjöbaden	Day 1	Day 49	9th Evicted; Day 49	7th
Maxine Lindin	26	Stockholm	Day 19	Day 49	10th Evicted; Day 49	6th
Per Renström	56	Västerhaninge	Day 1	Day 51	11th Evicted; Day 51	5th
Tim Mäklin	31	Falun	Day 1	Day 52	12th Evicted; Day 52	4th
Fredrik Trygg Kummertz	35	Tyresö	Day 1	Day 53	13th Evicted; Day 53	3rd
Cornelia Nordensson	30	Nacka	Day 27	Day 54	Runner-up; Day 54	2nd
Levin Larsson	33	Örby	Day 31	Day 54	Winner; Day 54	1st

== Torpet ==
A returning feature to Farmen is Torpet. Three former contestants start off on Torpet, trying to win a spot to get on the farm while each week facing against contestants who lost the duel on the farm, as they themselves try to win a spot back onto the farm.

Contestant	Age	Residence	Season(s)	Entered	Exited	Status	Finish
Maxine Lindin	26	Stockholm	2019	Day 1	Day 18	Won Duel; Entered Farm; Day 18	1st
Cornelia Nordensson	30	Nacka	2014; 2015	Day 1	Day 25	Won Duel; Entered Farm; Day 25	2nd
Levin Larsson	33	Örby	2022	Day 1	Day 30	Won Duel; Entered Farm; Day 30	3rd

== The game ==
Week	Farmer of the Week	1st Dueler	2nd Dueler	Evicted	Finish
1	Fredrik	Alessia; Cornelia	Per E. Yorgo	Per E.	Head of Farm; Day 5
2	~~Per E.~~; Yorgo (Note: After Per E. left the game, another duel was held with the previous duelists to determine the new head of farm)	Per R.	Alessia	Per E.	Left Competition; Day 6
2	~~Per E.~~; Yorgo	Per R.	Alessia	Desirée N.	Left Competition; Day 9
2	~~Per E.~~; Yorgo	Per R.	Alessia	Yorgo	Left Competition; Day 11
2	~~Per E.~~; Yorgo	Per R.	Alessia	Alessia	1st Evicted; Day 11
3	Cornelia	Ciro	Andreas	Ciro	2nd Evicted; Day 16
4	Tim	Per R.	Andreas	Andreas	3rd Evicted; Day 21
5	Jennifer	Per R.	Anna	Anna	4th Evicted; Day 26
6		Levin	Jennifer	Martina	Medically Evacuated; Day 29
6		Levin	Jennifer	Jennifer	5th Evicted; Day 33
7	Fredrik	Levin	Desirée	Desirée	6th Evicted; Day 39
8	Per R.	Ronja	Tim	Ronja	7th Evicted; Day 44
8	Per R.	Levin	Magnus	Magnus	8th Evicted; Day 44
9	None	Cornelia G. Cornelia N. Maxine		Cornelia G.	9th Evicted; Day 49
9	None	Cornelia G. Cornelia N. Maxine		Maxine	10th Evicted; Day 49
10	None	Per R.	Tim	Per R.	11th Evicted; Day 51
10	None	All		Tim	12th Evicted; Day 52
10	None	All		Fredrik	13th Evicted; Day 53
10	None	All		Cornelia N.	Runner-up; Day 54
10	None	All		Levin	Winner; Day 54
