= Holy well =

Well or spring revered in a religious context

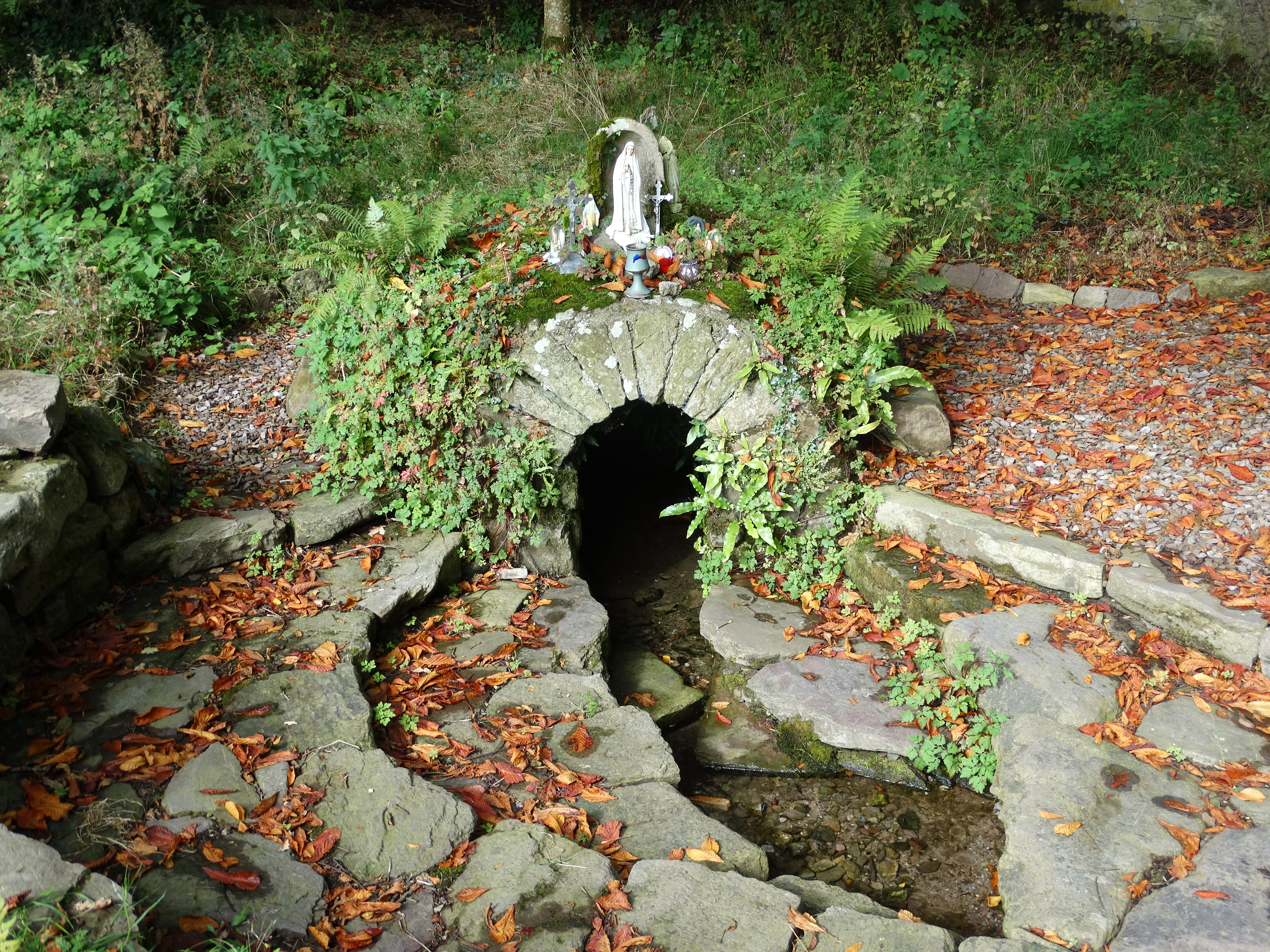
Holy well at Coole in County Cork, Ireland

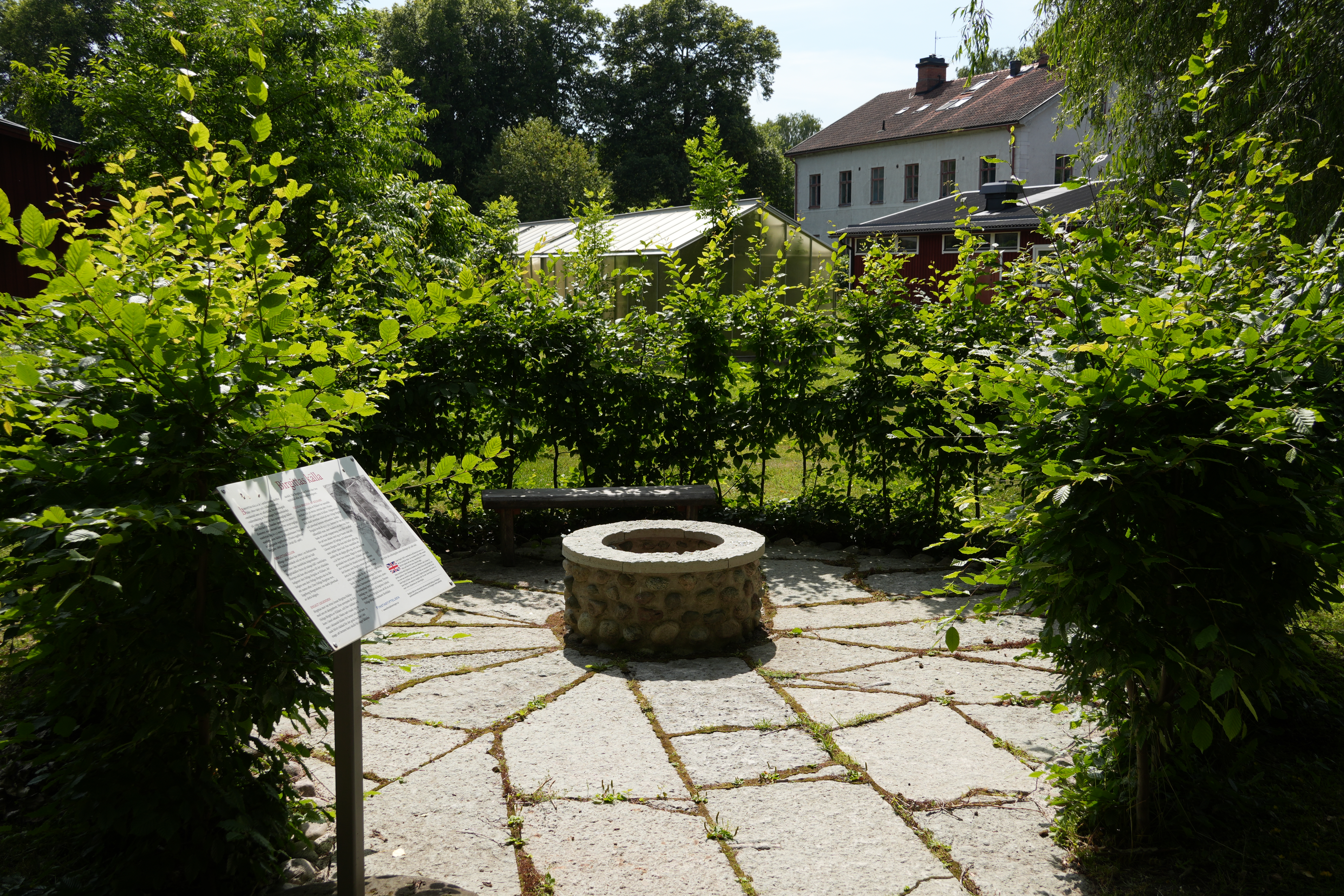
Saint Bridget's Holy Well near Skederid Church (Evangelical-Lutheran) in Finsta, Sweden

A holy well or sacred spring is a well, spring or small pool of water revered in Christianity as well as in pagan religions. The water of holy wells is often thought to have healing qualities, through the numinous presence of its guardian spirit or of a Christian saint. Local legends often become associated with the waters; for example in Christian legends, the action of a saint often originates the flow of the water, which may be regarded as holy water. Holy wells are often also places of ritual and pilgrimage, where people pray and leave votive offerings. In Celtic regions, strips of cloth are often tied to trees at holy wells, known as clootie wells.

== Names ==
The term haeligewielle is in origin an Anglo-Saxon toponym attached to specific springs in the landscape; its current use has arisen through folklore scholars, antiquarians, and other writers generalising from those actual 'Holy Wells', which survived into the modern era. The term 'holy-hole' is sometimes employed.

== Culture and representation ==
Holy wells in different forms occur in such a wide variety of cultures, religious environments, and historical periods that it seems to be a universal human instinct to revere water sources. However, the fragmentary nature of the evidence, and the historical differences among cultures and nations, make it very hard to generalize. While there are a few national studies of holy well lore and history, mainly concentrating on Ireland and the British Isles, there is a need for more work examining other regions.

The earliest work specifically devoted to holy wells is Philip Dixon Hardy's Holy Wells of Ireland (1836), a Protestant attack on Catholic observances at Irish wells bearing the names of Christian saints, or otherwise considered sacred. By the late 19th century, the term had evolved to its current usage. Robert Charles Hope's The Legendary Lore of the Holy Wells of England (1893), the first comprehensive survey of its kind, featured several named wells not dedicated to saints, along with rivers and lakes associated with folklore, as noted in Hope's subtitle.

== Origin and development ==
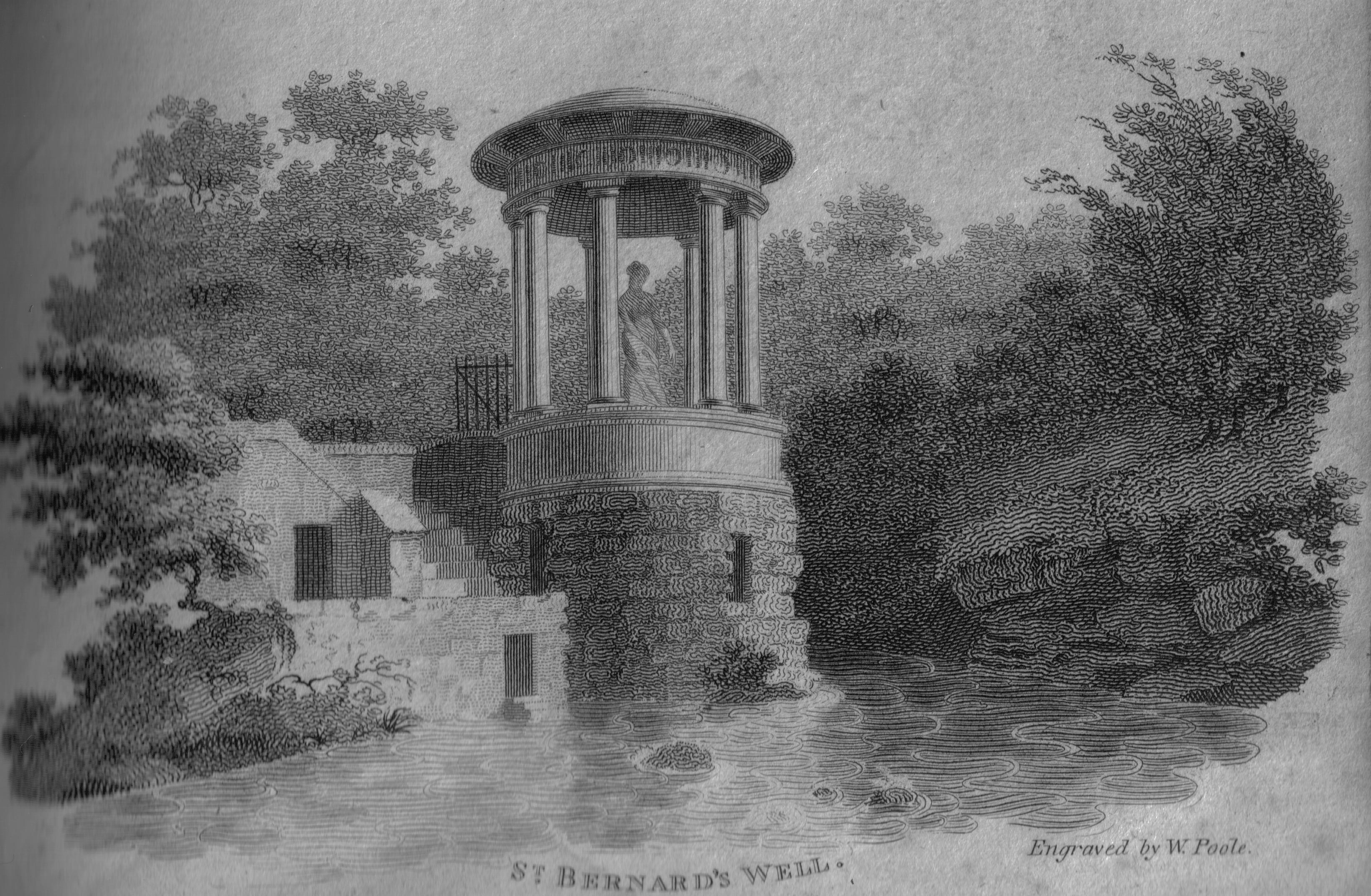
Saint Bernard's well in Stockbridge, Edinburgh in 1800.

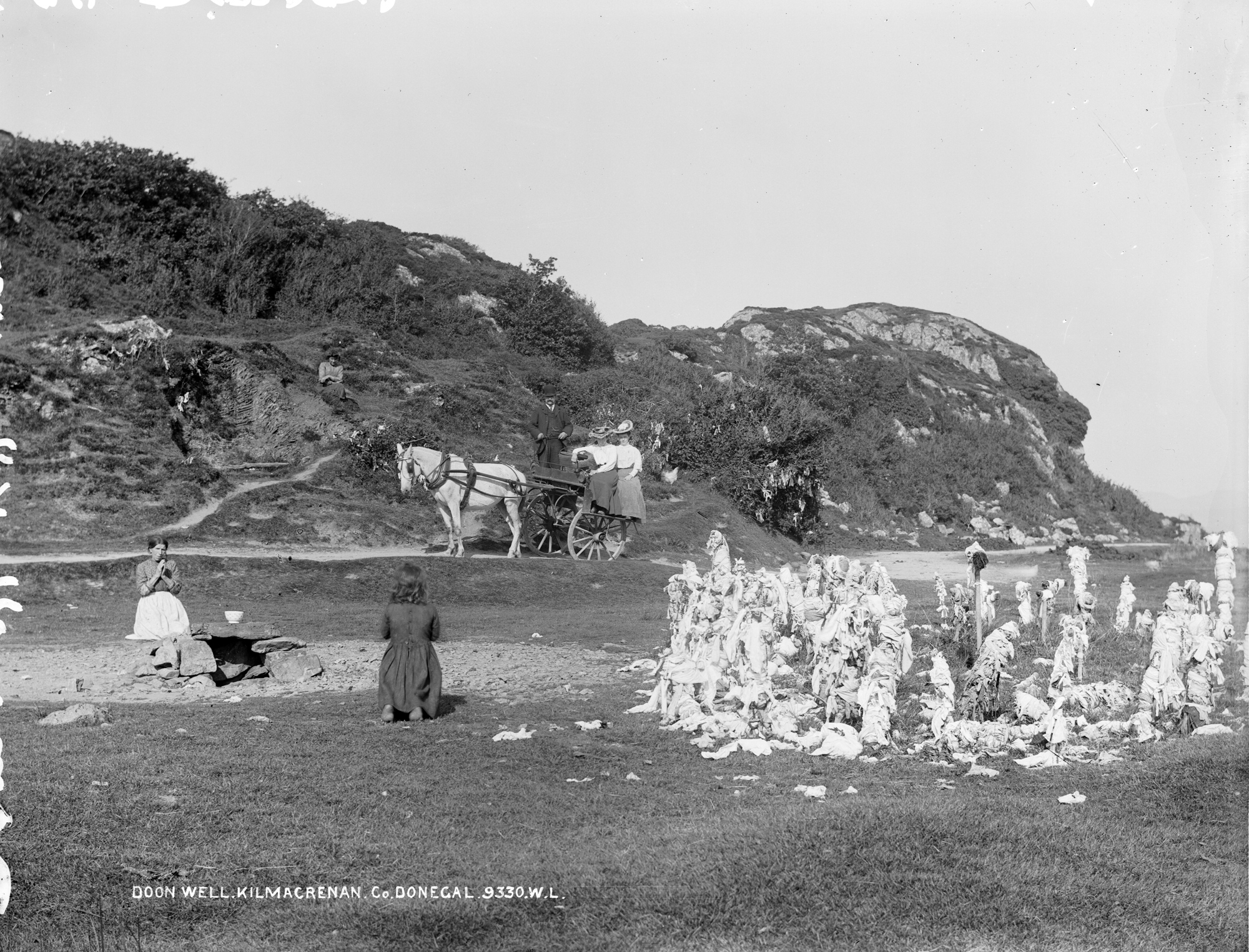
Doon Well at Kilmacrennan in County Donegal, Ireland, c.1900. On the left, two women are praying by the well. On the right, an array of crutches, bandages and rosary beads deliberately left at the well by Christian pilgrims.

In ancient Greece and Rome, a nymphaeum or nymphaion (Greek: νυμφαίον), was a monument consecrated to the nymphs, especially those of springs.

In England, examples of reverence for wells and springs occur at a variety of historical periods. The medieval traveller William of Worcester saw a 'holy-hole, or well' within the cave at Wookey (Somerset), a site of human habitation in the Palaeolithic era and the source of a river which had been the site of ritual activity. The proximity of named springs to Neolithic or Iron Age monuments, such as the Swallowhead Springs, close to Silbury Hill (Wiltshire) or the Holy Well near Tadmarton Hill (Oxfordshire), suggests that reverence for such sites continued without a break. There is abundant evidence for the importance of wells and springs in the Roman and sub-Roman period, not just at temple complexes such as Bath (Somerset), Chedworth (Gloucestershire), and Blunsdon Ridge (Wiltshire) which have medicinal springs at their centre, but a variety of smaller sites, and at wells and ritual shafts used for superstitious and sub-religious rituals.

Christianity strongly affected the development of holy wells in Europe and the Middle East. Aside from the spring that issued from the staff of Moses and the Well of Beersheba, there were already a number of sites mentioned in Jewish and Christian folklore, including Moses' well near Mount Nebo, visited by the fourth-century nun Egeria and many other pilgrims. St Athanasius' Life of St Antony, written about 356–62, mentions the well created by the desert hermit Antony. It is unclear how many Christian holy wells there may have been, as records are very fragmentary and often a well appears only once, making it impossible to tell when reverence for it began and when it ceased, but by the Calvinist Reformation in England, for instance, probably some hundreds. As they were closely linked with the cults of the saints, many wells in countries that converted to the Reformed branch of Christianity (Continental Reformed, Anglican, Presbyterian and Congregationalist) fell into disuse and were lost, the Holy Well at Walsingham (Norfolk) being a good example, which, having been an integral element of the pilgrimage to the shrine of the Virgin Mary in the village, vanished completely. Nevertheless, this particular holy well at the Anglican Shrine of Our Lady of Walsingham was restored nearby the original site and its water is known for its healing properties, thus making it a popular site of Christian religious pilgrimage. In Catholic and Evangelical-Lutheran countries, the visitation to holy wells continued, such as to the Saint Bridget's Holy Well near Skederid Church (Evangelical-Lutheran) in Finsta, Sweden. Visiting of wells for therapeutic and entertainment purposes did not completely die out, however, as spas became fashionable in the 17th century and later. Eventually, antiquarians (from the 17th century) and folklorists (from the 19th) began to take notice of holy wells and record their surviving traditions.

More than a hundred holy wells exist in Cornwall, each associated with a particular saint, though not always the same one as the dedication of the church.

Several holy wells also survive in Turkey, called ayazma in Turkish, from Greek ἁγίασμα (hagiasma), literally "holiness". Examples of hagiasmata are found in the Church of St. Mary of the Spring and the Church of St. Mary of Blachernae, both located in Istanbul.

== Historiographical controversies ==
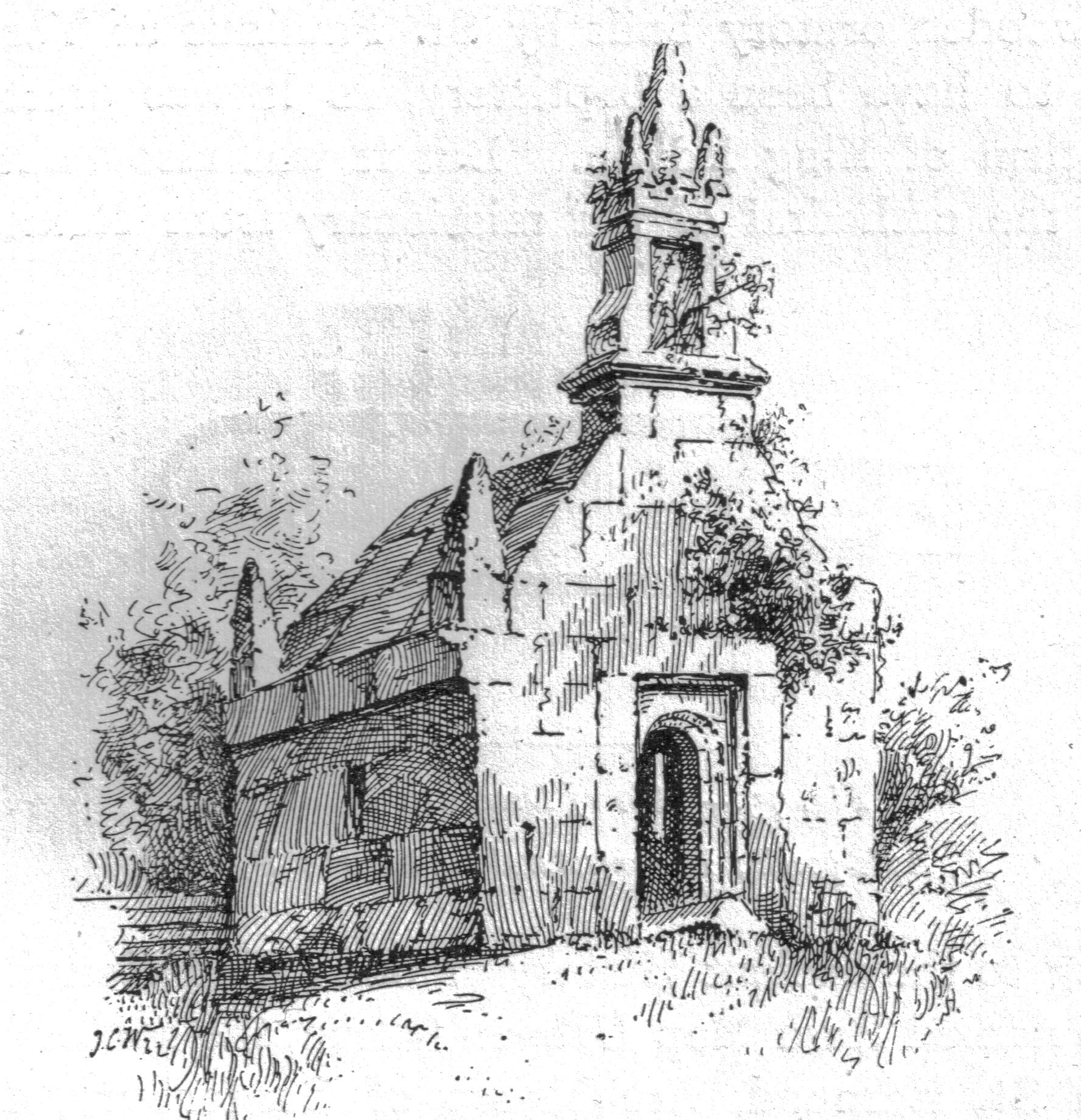
Dupath Well in 1912.

The Protestant Reformers of the 16th century, particularly those of the Reformed tradition, often assumed that medieval Catholic practices embodied lingering remains of pagan religious practices and thought of holy wells in that way. This affected the outlook of those who came to study holy well traditions later. The pioneers of folklore study took the view that the customs and legends they were recording were debased versions of pagan rites and myths. Thus it became standard to begin any account of holy wells with the statement that the Christian church had adopted them from the pagans and replaced the heathen gods with Christian saints, in order to win people over to the new religion more smoothly. Among the earliest enthusiasts for holy wells in modern times was the Neopagan movement, for whom wells formed part of 'earth mysteries' study along with ley lines and ancient sites; the view that the Christians had 'stolen' holy wells from the pagan religions fitted in well with their position. The magazines Wood and Water and Meyn Mamvro, among others, helped shape this approach. During the early and mid-1990s, this viewpoint was under increasing attack crowned by the publication of Ronald Hutton's The Pagan Religions of the Ancient British Isles (1991) which argued that the evidence for what constituted pre-Christian British religious practices, certainly outside Romano-British times, was next to nil. As far as wells themselves were concerned, the controversy emerged in the pages of Source, the holy wells journal edited by Roy Fry and former Benedictine monk Tristan Gray-Hulse. A number of articles in the journal challenged long-standing myths about holy well history, and the editors published an exchange between the authors and Cheryl Straffon, editor of Cornish earth mysteries magazine Meyn Mamvro, about the evidence for a particular Cornish well's supposed association with the Irish goddess Brigid. The eco-pagan movement has largely accepted the new historiographical approach, but occasionally rather more old-fashioned accounts of holy wells are published, for instance, Gary Varner's Sacred Springs (2002).

A related argument was over the nature of the influence of the Celts on the well cult. The late Francine Nicholson, an independent student of Celtica, argued forcefully and controversially that the Celts had a unique sensitivity to sacred wells, but never elaborated this in any published work. More recently, radically minded scholars have begun questioning the unity of concepts imposed by the term 'holy well'. In a paper in the Living Spring Journal, Jeremy Harte distinguishes between early Anglo-Saxon 'holy wells' and those Christianised in the Late Middle Ages, and argues 'apart from being venerated and being wet, they have little in common'; Harte has also stressed that limited evidence may mean scholars are considerably overestimating the number of holy wells which were active at any one time.

== Modern revival ==
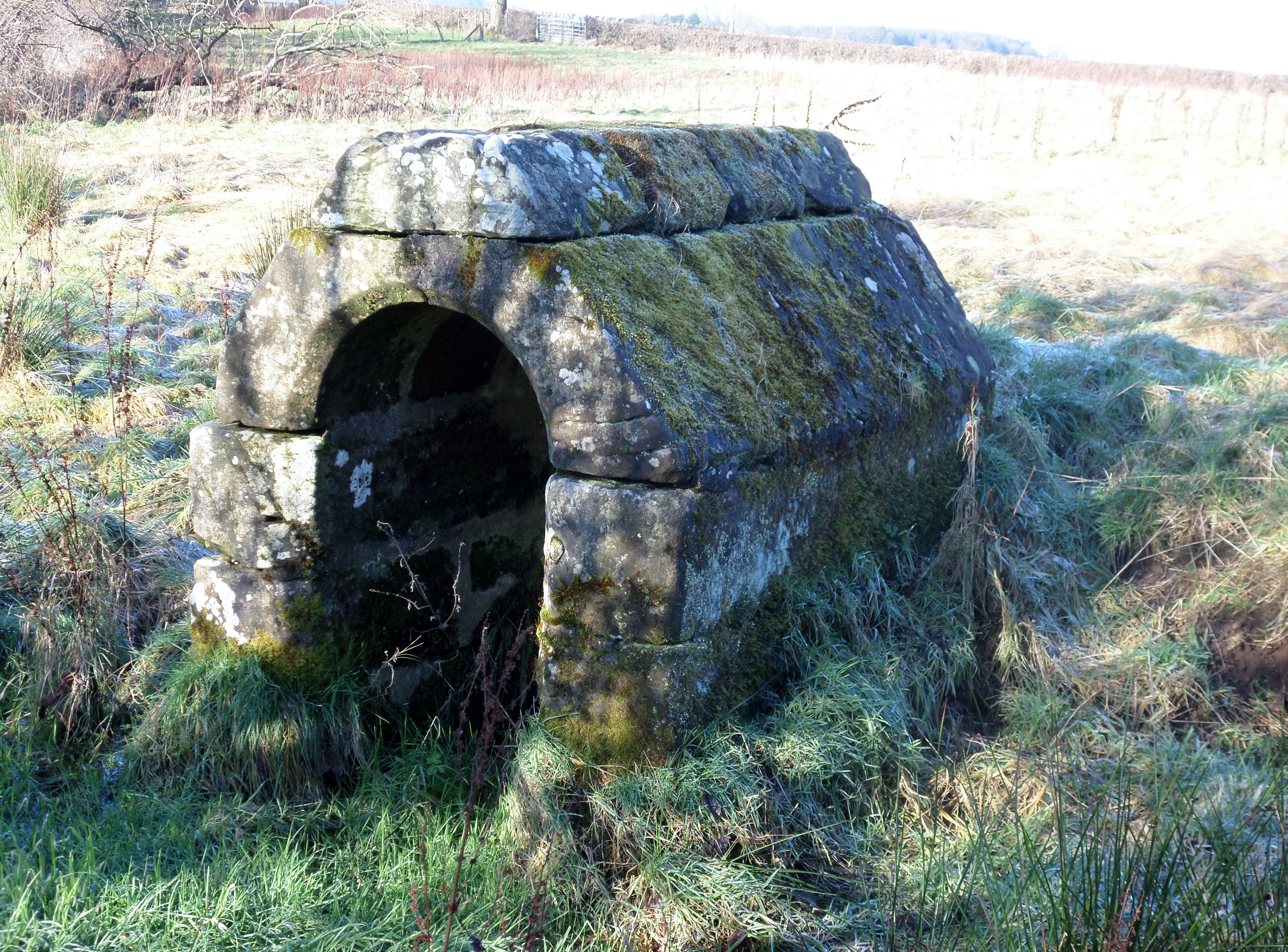
St Peter's Well, Houston in Scotland. A rare Scottish covered well.

In a sense, the restoration of holy wells began almost as soon as they were in decline, as a number became the subject of antiquarian interest and some were turned into garden features and put to other decorative uses. However, in more modern times wells have been restored as an expression of interest in the past, sometimes from romantic or religious motives, but mostly as a statement of continuity with the history of a particular community. A good example is St Osyth's Well at Bierton (Buckinghamshire), 'restored' (and in the process rebuilt completely) by the Parish Council as part of a project marking Millennium Year in 2000.

The most active holy wells in Britain are those linked to Christian pilgrimages, at Walsingham, Fernyhalgh (Lancashire) and Holywell (Wales), or popular tourist sites (Bath, Somerset). The Chalice Well at Glastonbury (Somerset) is at the centre of a modern pagan- and New Age-orientated spirituality and retreat centre. Other wells, however, are often visited on an informal basis for religious or sightseeing reasons. New forms of holy well reverence continue to emerge now and again, notoriously the so-called Well of the Triple Goddess at Minster-in-Sheppey (Kent). In 2001 Channel 4's archaeological television programme Time Team was responsible for exposing the infamous archaeological fraud of Llygadwy, a site which included an alleged holy well.

Historiographically, the publication of Janet and Colin Bord's Sacred Waters (1985) was influential in reviving interest in the history and folklore of holy wells in Britain. The same year saw the foundation of the journal Source by Mark Valentine. Attempts to maintain a regular journal for the study of holy wells have been erratic (Source enjoyed two runs from 1985 to 1989 and 1994 to 1998, and the web-based Living Spring has had only two issues to date).

== Preservation ==
Often unmarked on maps and undistinguished by archaeological features, holy wells are a potentially vulnerable category of ancient site. Some example have been lost to farming, drainage work, development or neglect. Some examples include:

- the desecration of St Bridget's Well at Rosepark, Balrothery (County Dublin, Ireland), destroyed by building work in 2003 despite being a protected monument
- the destruction of a well at Rath Lugh during the construction of the M3 Motorway in the Tara-Skryne Valley in Ireland.

== Gallery ==
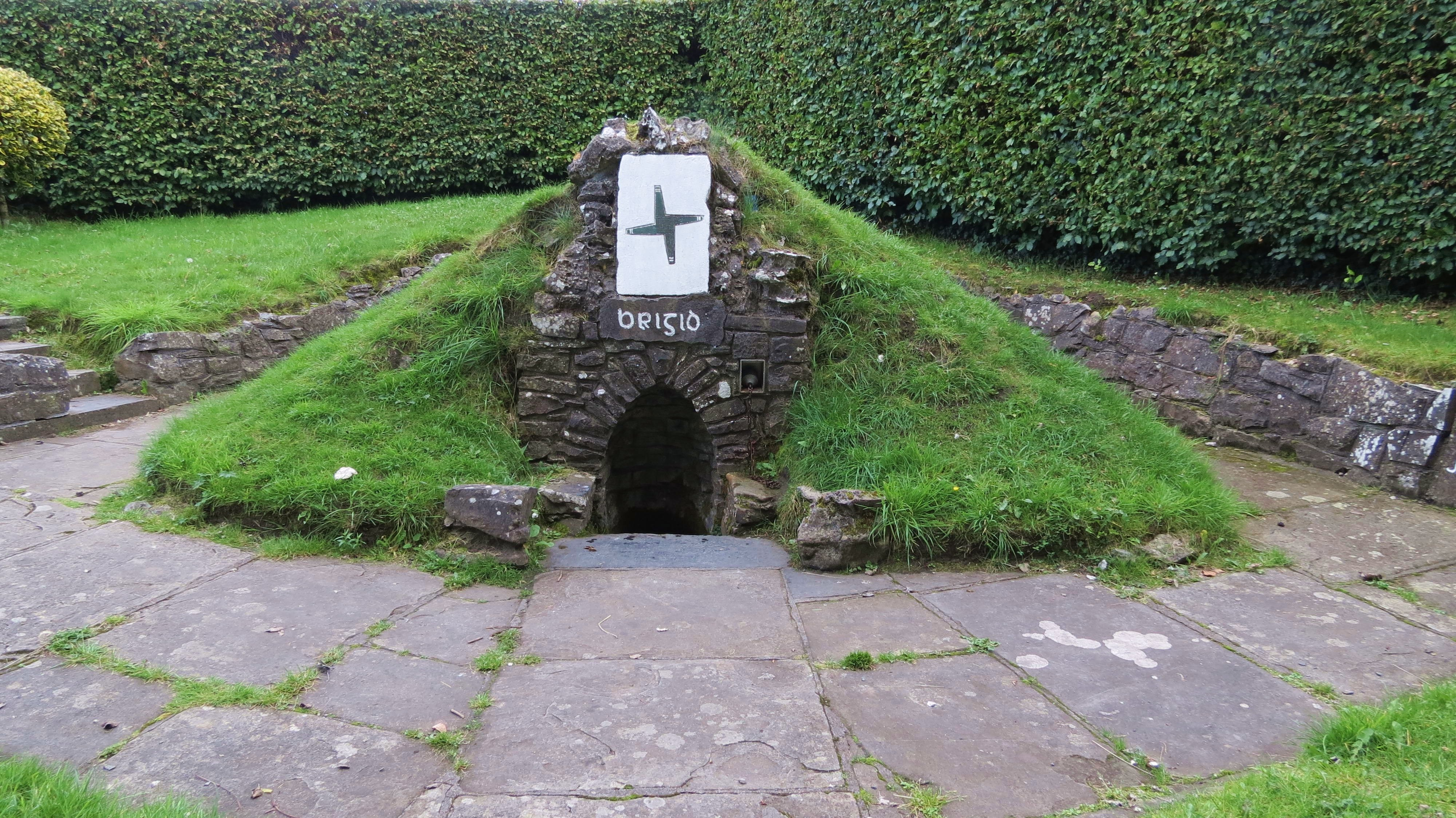
St Brigid's Well, Cullion, County Westmeath

Saint Olaf's Holy Well, located near Saint Olaf's Church (Evangelical-Lutheran) in Österlen

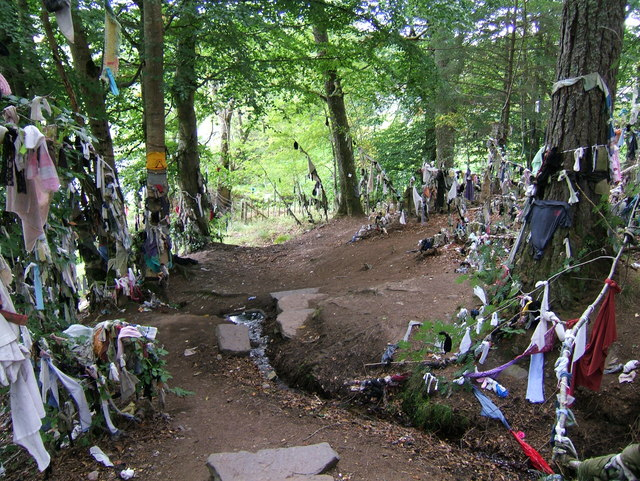
Clootie well at Munlochy, Scotland

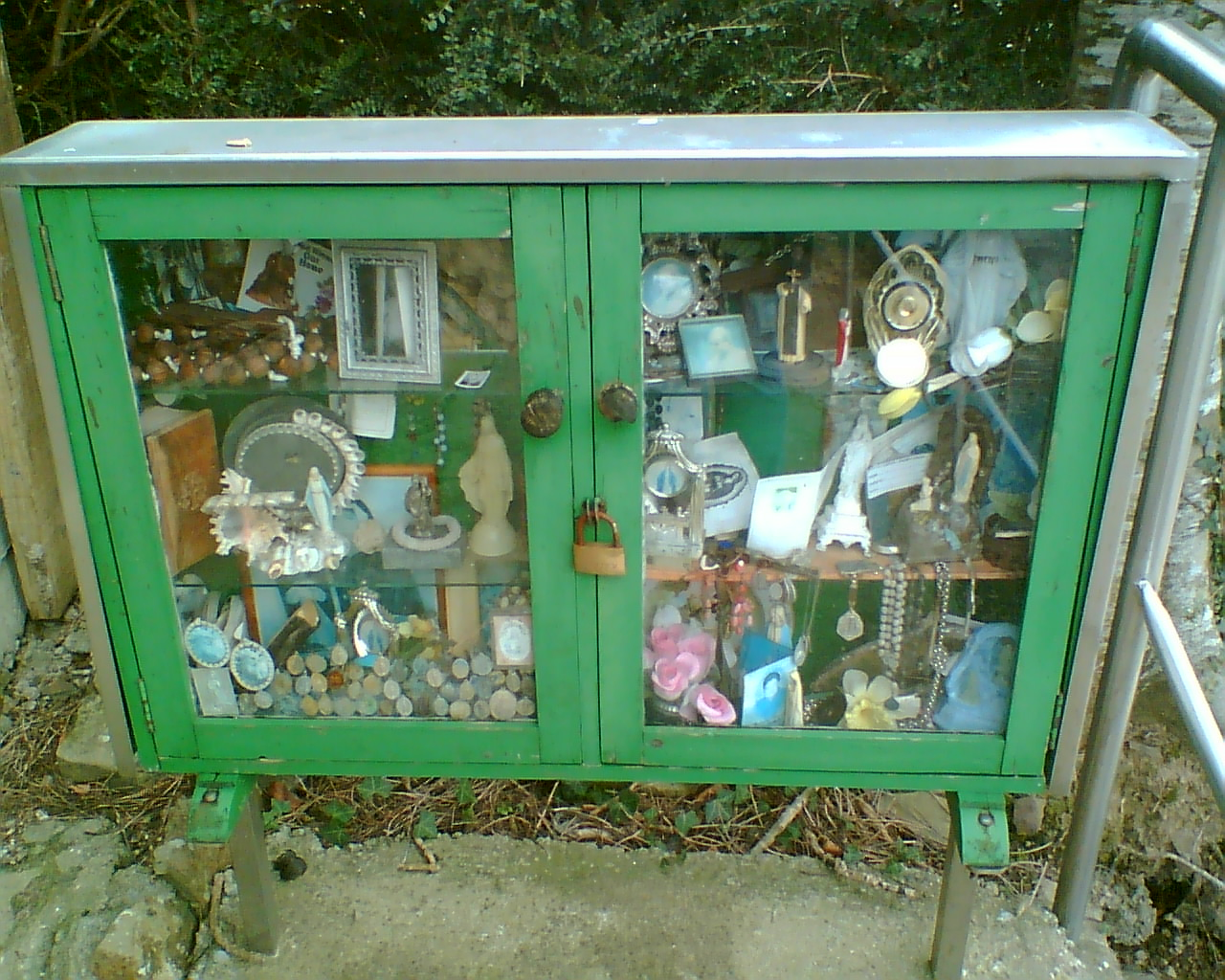
A cabinet containing offerings from pilgrims to a well

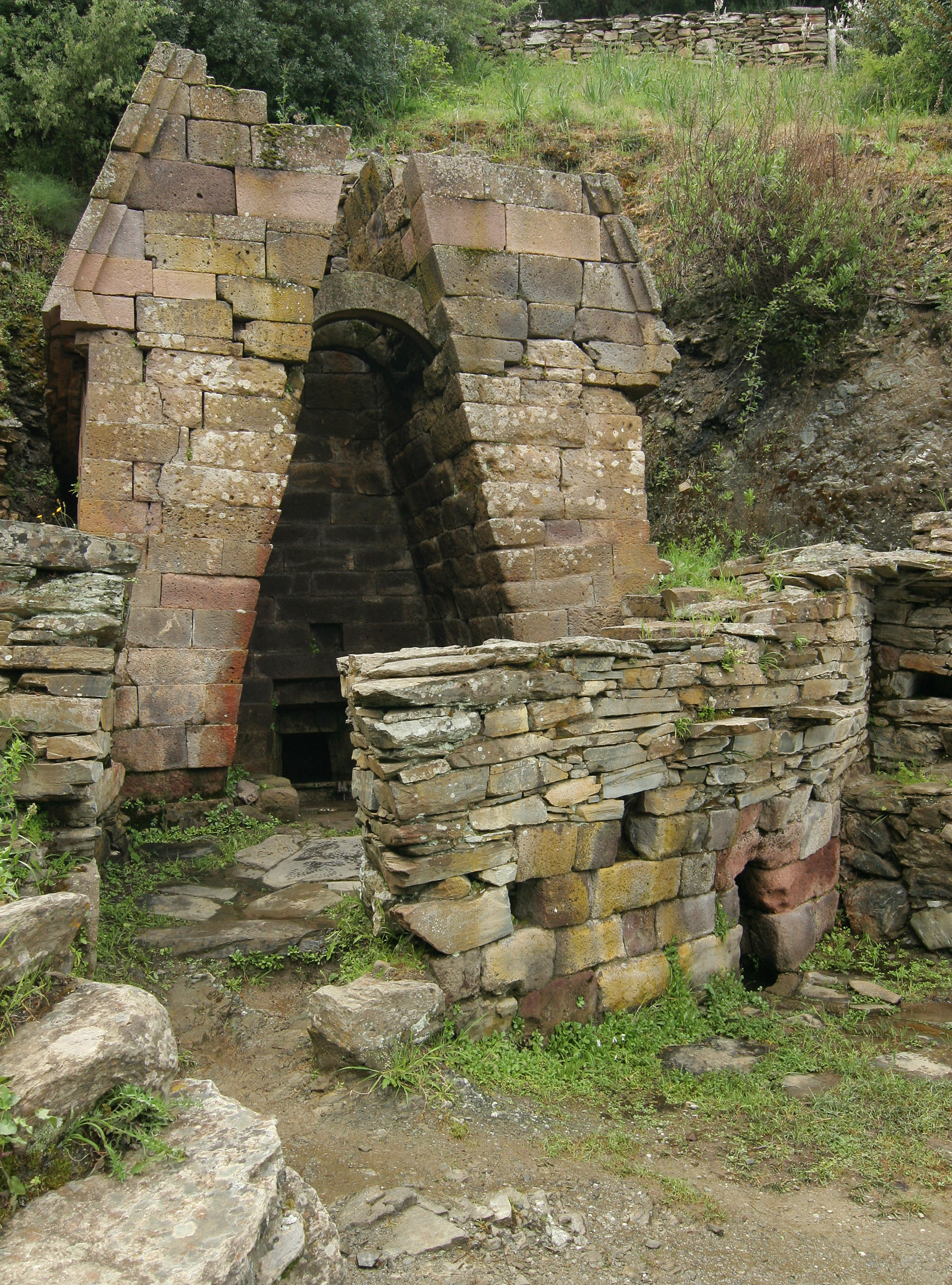
Su Tempiesu well, Orune, Sardinia

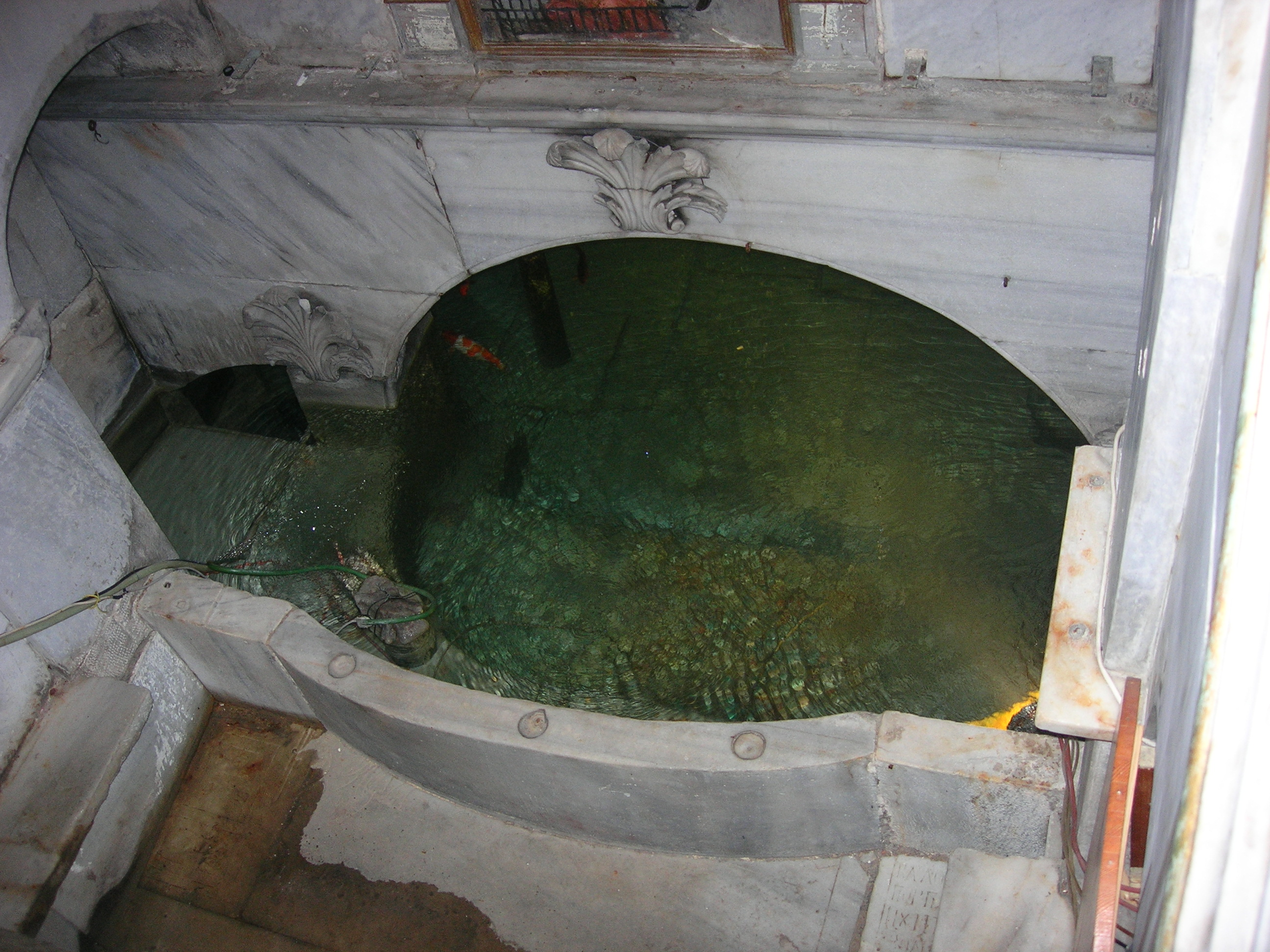
Holy well (Hagiasma) of St. Mary of the Spring in Istanbul.

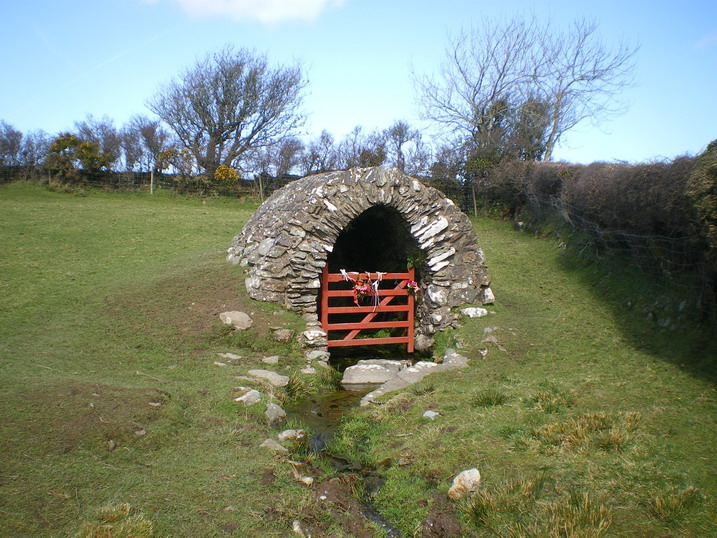
Llanllawer Holy Well, Wales

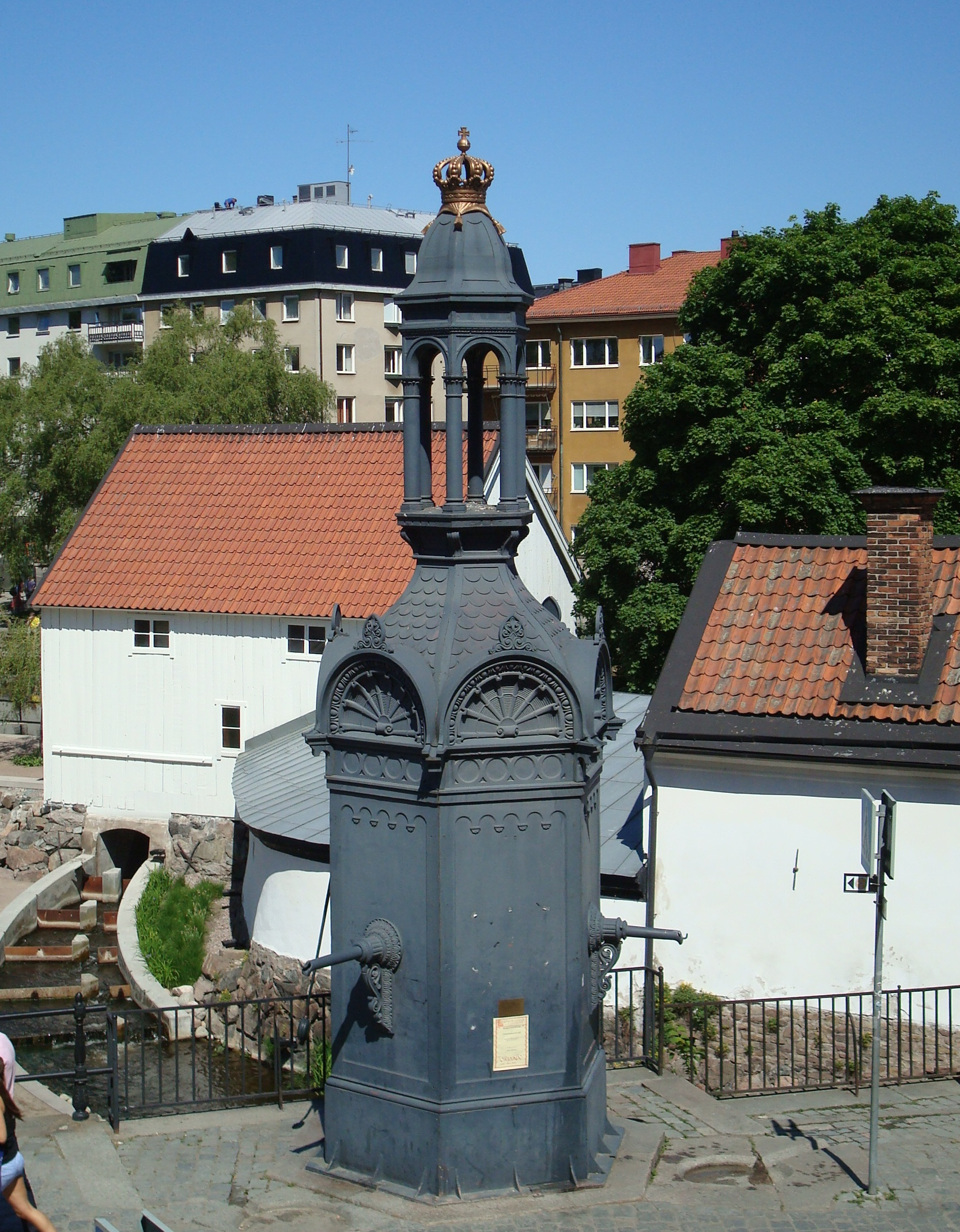
St Erik's Holy Well at Uppsala Cathedral (Evangelical-Lutheran)

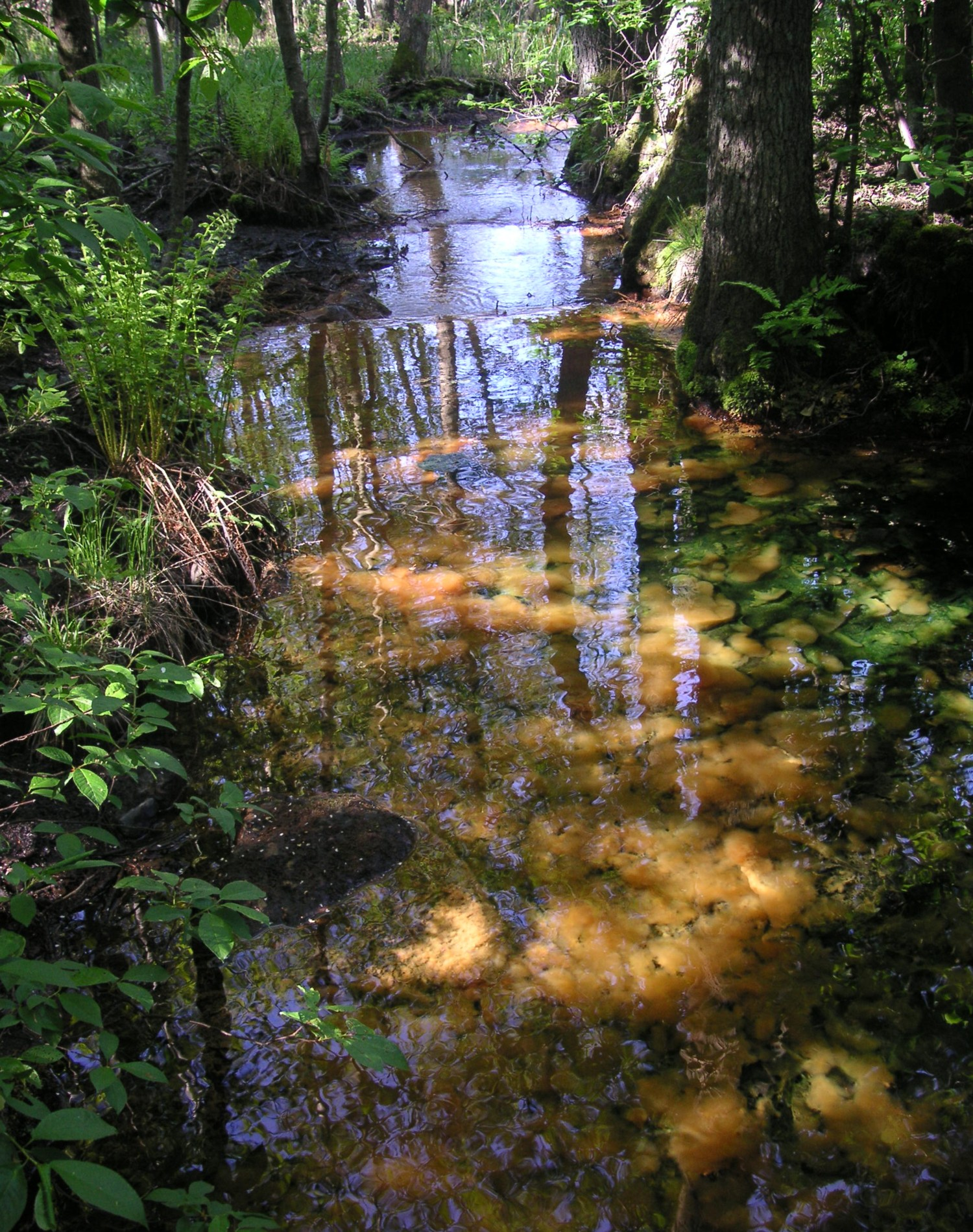
Saint Botvid's Holy Spring near Salem Church (Evangelical-Lutheran) in Botkyrka Municipality

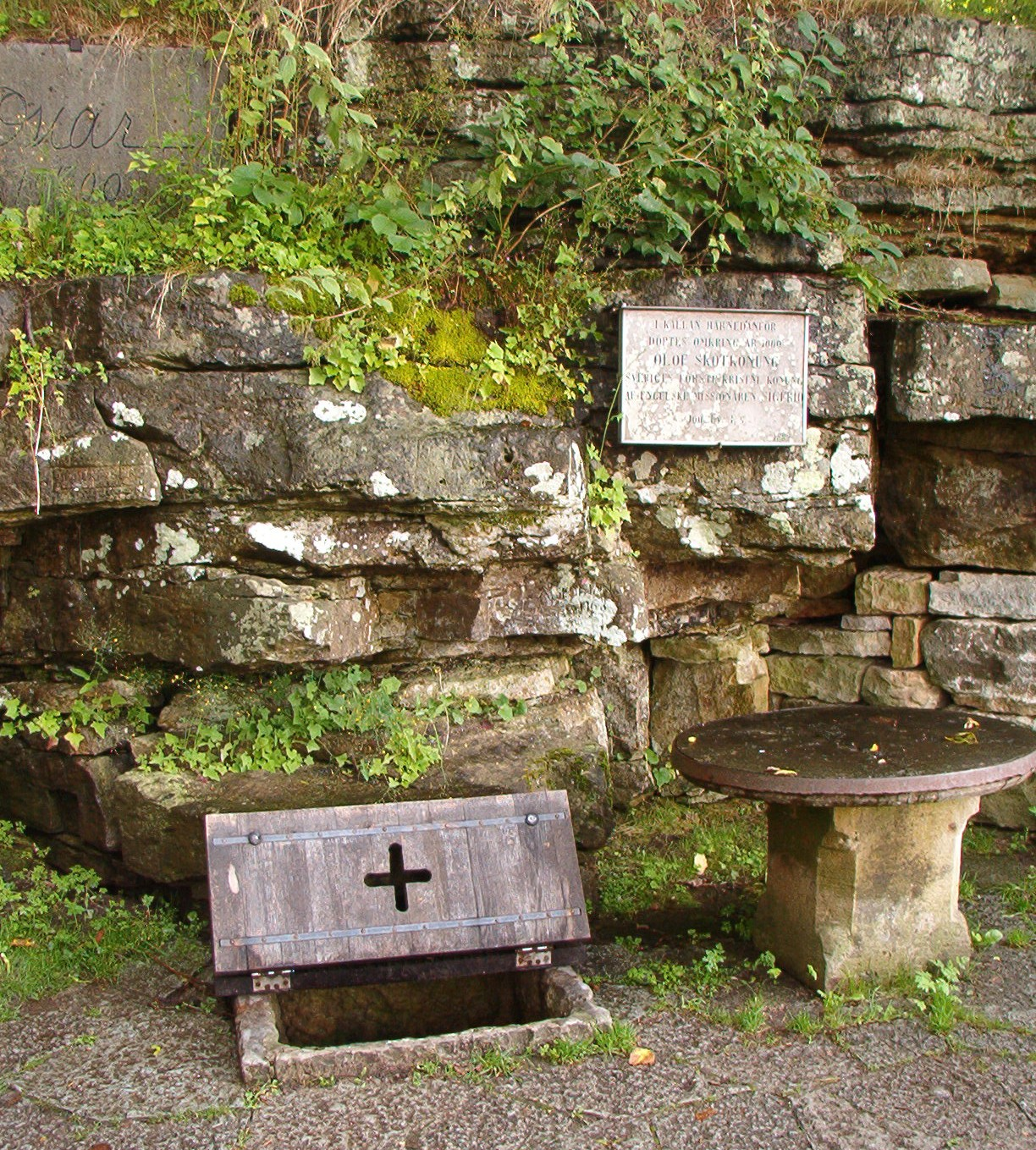
St Sigfrid's Holy Well at Husaby Church (Evangelical-Lutheran)

== See also ==
- Fountain of Youth
- Holy water
- Nature worship
- Nuragic holy well
- Sacred waters
- Water deity
- Well dressing
- Well of Wyrd
- Wishing well
