= Farmen 2026 (Sweden) =

- Season 19
- Presented by: Anna Brolin
- No. of days: 50
- No. of contestants: 19
- Winner: Alexander Söderholm
- Runner-up: Ahmed Asp Porgord
- Location: Kinda, Sweden

Release
- Original network: TV4
- Original release: January 18 – March 29, 2026

Season chronology
- ← Previous; Farmen 2025 Next → Farmen 2027

Farmen 2026 (The Farm 2026) is the nineteenth season of the Swedish reality television series Farmen. The series brings 16 Swedes to a new farm located in the Kinda Municipality in Sweden which brings contestants back to a farm as it was operated a century prior. They work together, compete in challenges and duels until one remains to win the grand prize of 500,000 kr.. Anna Brolin returns once again as host alongside farm mentor Hans Wincent. The season premieres on TV4 on 18 January 2026.

== Finishing order ==
Amongst the contestants is former Robinson contestant Bo Jonsson, former Bachelor 2022 contestant Angelica Johnsen, former Ex on the Beach Sweden contestant Amanda Kniberg and Social Media Influencer Nathvadi "Pim" Kwampaiboo.

(age are stated at time of competition)

List of Farmen 2026 contestants
Contestant	Age	Residence	Entered	Exited	Status	Finish
Tindra Bohte	21	Traryd	Day 1	Day 5	1st Evicted; Day 5	19th
Ayda Kayedpour	18	Kumla	Day 1	Day 10	2nd Evicted; Day 10	18th
Jonas Ackelman	45	Enköping	Day 1	Day 15	3rd Evicted; Day 15	17th
Nathvadi "Pim" Kwampaiboon	30	Stockholm	Day 1	Day 15	Quit; Day 15	16th
Nils Karlsson	51	Limhamn	Day 1	Day 15	Quit; Day 15	15th
Kevin Lehnberg	46	Kristianstad	Day 1	Day 20	4th Evicted; Day 20	14th
Hampus Skoglund	33	Sankt Olof	Day 23	Day 25	Quit; Day 25	13th
Nowaleya Haag	21	Trollhättan	Day 23	Day 25	5th Evicted; Day 25	12th
Angelica Johnsen	29	Huddinge	Day 1	Day 30	6th Evicted; Day 30	11th
Amanda Kniberg	29	Malmö	Day 1	Day 35	7th Evicted; Day 35	10th
Niklas Petersson	36	Borensberg	Day 1	Day 40	8th Evicted; Day 40	9th
Jenny Isaksson	48	Sigtuna	Day 1	Day 44	9th Evicted; Day 44	8th
Bo Jonsson	66	Segeltorp	Day 1	Day 45	10th Evicted; Day 45	7th
Vanessa Salloumova	30	Gothenburg	Day 1	Day 46	11th Evicted; Day 46	6th
Erik Berg Sijmons	23	Riddarhyttan	Day 1	Day 47	12th Evicted; Day 47	5th
Jörgen Bergström	51	Rosersberg	Day 23	Day 48	13th Evicted; Day 48	4th
Stephanie Hönig	40	Tollered	Day 1	Day 49	14th Evicted; Day 49	3rd
Ahmed Asp Porgord	38	Storvreta	Day 1	Day 50	Runner-up; Day 50	2nd
Alexander Söderholm	32	Folkärna	Day 1	Day 50	Winner; Day 50	1st

== Torpet ==
Contestant	Age	Residence	Entered	Exited	Status	Finish
Hampus Skoglund	33	Sankt Olof	Day 21	Day 23	Entered Farm; Day 23	
Jörgen Bergström	51	Rosersberg	Day 21	Day 23	Entered Farm; Day 23	
Nowaleya Haag	21	Trollhättan	Day 21	Day 23	Entered Farm; Day 23	

== The game ==
Week	Farmer of the Week	1st Dueler	2nd Dueler	Evicted	Finish
1	Bo	Ayda	Tindra	Tindra	1st Evicted; Day 5
2	Amanda	Vanessa	Jenny; Ayda	Ayda	2nd Evicted; Day 10
3	Nils	Jonas	Ahmed	Jonas	3rd Evicted; Day 15
3	Nils	Jonas	Ahmed	Pim	Quit; Day 15
3	Nils	Jonas	Ahmed	Nils	Quit; Day 15
4					4th Evicted; Day 20
