= Brolin =

Brolin is a surname, most commonly occurring in Sweden. Notable people with the surname include:

- Adrian Brolin (1890–1954), Swedish professional football player
- Anna Brolin (born 1980), Swedish sports reporter and sport-television presenter
- Eden Brolin (born 1994), American actress and singer
- James Brolin (born 1940), American actor, producer, and director
- Josh Brolin (born 1968), American actor
- Samuel Brolin (born 2000), Swedish professional football player
- Tomas Brolin (born 1969), Swedish professional football player
