= Farmen 2022 (Sweden) =

- Season 15
- Presented by: Anna Brolin
- No. of contestants: 18
- Winner: TBD
- Runner-up: TBD
- Location: Brandsjön, Vaggeryd, Sweden

Release
- Original network: TV4
- Original release: 9 January 2022 – present

Season chronology
- ← Previous; Farmen 2021

Farmen 2022 (The Farm 2022) is the fifteenth season of the Swedish reality television series Farmen. 17 Swedes from across Sweden live on the farm like it was 100 years prior and compete in tasks to earn money for shopping, animals, tools for the farm, etc. Each week a duel takes place where one contestant is eliminated. In the finals, the final 2 compete in a final duel where the winners walks away with 500,000 kr. and the title of Farmen 2022. Anna Brolin continued as host while Hans Wincent continued as Farm mentor. The season premiered on 9 January 2022 on TV4.

== Finishing order ==
(ages stated are at time of contest)

Contestant	Age	Residence	Entered	Exited	Status	Finish
Alexander Segerström	30	Stockholm	Day 1	Day 5	1st Evicted; Day 5	18th
Kalle Zeman	37	Bromma	Day 1	Day 7	Left Competition; Day 7	17th
Michaela Jankulicova	25	Uppsala	Day 1	Day 15	2nd Evicted; Day 15	16th
Josefine Ahlin	23	Gävle	Day 1	Day 17	Left Competition; Day 17	15th
Levin Larsson	31	Örby	Day 1	Day 20	3rd Evicted; Day 20	14th
Niklas Johansson	29	Stockholm	Day 1	Day 25	4th Evicted; Day 25	13th
Abel Kakeeto	44	Skarpnäck	Day 6	Day 30	5th Evicted; Day 30	12th
Izabella Andersson Acimovic	28	Norrköping	Day 1	Day 34	Left Competition; Day 34	11th
Gerty Borg	61	Trelleborg	Day 6	Day 35	6th Evicted; Day 35	10th
Arlind Klimenta	33	Halmstad	Day 1			
Beatrice Larsson	57	Gothenburg	Day 6			
Cecilia Ahlborg	39	Vollsjö	Day 1			
Helené Fransson	26	Mölndal	Day 1			
Jonas Svensson	35	Strängnäs	Day 1			
Keshia Barbour	31	Rönninge	Day 1			
Monika Ostrowska	39	Stockholm	Day 16			
Prins Wendel	60	Ystad	Day 6			
Victoria Verovič Larsson	27	Stockholm	Day 1			

== The game ==
Week	Farmer of the Week	1st Dueler	2nd Dueler	Evicted	Finish
1	Cecilia	Alexander	Prins	Alexander	1st Evicted; Day 5
2	Victoria			Kalle	Left Competition; Day 7
2	Victoria				2nd Evicted; Day 10
