= Farmen 2025 (Sweden) =

- Season 18
- Presented by: Anna Brolin
- No. of days: 50
- No. of contestants: 16
- Winner: Mikael Andersson
- Runner-up: Amanda Teroni
- Location: Brandsjön, Vaggeryd, Sweden

Release
- Original network: TV4
- Original release: January 19 – March 30, 2025

Season chronology
- ← Previous; Farmen 2024 Next → Farmen 2026

Farmen 2025 (The Farm 2025) is the eighteenth season of the Swedish reality television series Farmen. 16 Swedes from across Sweden live on the farm like it was 100 years prior and compete in tasks to earn money for shopping, animals, tools for the farm, etc. Each week a duel takes place where one contestant is eliminated. In the finals, the final two compete in a final duel where the winners walks away with 500,000 kr. and the title of Farmen 2025. The season for the first time, divides contestants into two teams. One called Brandstorp and Lillängen. The season premiered on 19 January 2025.

== Finishing order ==
(age are stated at time of competition)

Contestant	Age	Residence	Starting Team	Entered	Exited	Status	Finish
Peter Rönnlund	37	Gothenburg	Brandstorp	Day 1	Day 3	Ejected; Day 3	16th
Graham Sudders	64	Pelarne	Brandstorp	Day 1	Day 5	Medically evacuated Day 5	15th
Jonna Abrahamsson	38	Anderslöv	Lillängen	Day 1	Day 11	Quit; Day 11	14th
Jessica Lundström Krüger	30	Södertälje	Lillängen	Day 1	Day 21	1st Evicted; Day 21	13th
Nathalie Kalmér	38	Visingsö	Brandstorp	Day 1	Day 24	Quit; Day 24	12th
Hanna Ankartjärn	39	Hedemora	Lillängen	Day 1	Day 26	2nd Evicted; Day 26	11th
Robert Nilsson	35	Solna	Brandstorp	Day 1	Day 32	Quit due to Family Emergency; Day 32	10th
Niklas Kjellander	25	Uppsala	Brandstorp	Day 1	Day 36	4th Evicted; Day 36	9th
Alida Kanthe	29	Gothenburg	Lillängen	Day 1	Day 41	5th Evicted; Day 41	8th
Sofia Kosunen	35	Gothenburg	Lillängen	Day 1	Day 46	6th Evicted; Day 46	7th
Andreas Holgersson	28	Karlskrona	Lillängen	Day 1	Day 46	7th Evicted; Day 46	6th
Marica Stridh	50	Lidköping/Töreboda	Brandstorp	Day 1	Day 47	8th Evicted; Day 47	5th
Adam Bajalan	25	Hässelby	Brandstorp	Day 1	Day 48	9th Evicted; Day 48	4th
Jesper Dragunowicz	31	Gothenburg	Lillängen	Day 1	Day 49	10th Evicted; Day 49	3rd
Amanda Teroni	23	Stockholm	Lillängen	Day 1	Day 31	3rd Evicted; Day 31	2nd
Amanda Teroni	23	Stockholm	Lillängen	Day 33	Day 50	Runner-up; Day 50	2nd
Mikael Andersson	34	Trosa	Brandstorp	Day 1	Day 50	Winner; Day 50	1st

== The game ==
Week	Farmer of the Week	1st Dueler	2nd Dueler	Evicted	Finish
1					1st Evicted; Day 5
