= Farmen 2021 (Sweden) =

- Genre: Reality Show
- Presented by: Anna Brolin
- Country of origin: Sweden
- Original language: Swedish

Original release
- Network: TV4
- Release: 10 January – 21 March 2021

Related
- Farmen 2020; Farmen 2022

Farmen 2021 (The Farm 2021) is the fourteenth season of the Swedish version of The Farm reality television show. 17 contestants arrived on the farm where they have to complete tasks in order to help win equipment and food. Each week, two contestants are chosen to duel where the winner remains and the loser has to leave the farm. This season is the first to be hosted by Anna Brolin who appears alongside the returning farm mentor, Hans Wincent. The season premieres on 10 January 2021 on TV4.

== Finishing order ==
(age are stated at time of competition)

Contestant	Age	Residence	Entered	Exited	Status	Finish
Philip Albinsson; Returned to Game	26	Kristinehamn	Day 1	Day 7	1st Evicted; Day 7	
Robin Kacaniklic; Returned to Game	32	Stockholm	Day 1	Day 7	2nd Evicted; Day 7	
Dag Tolstoy	27	Stockholm	Day 1	Day 14	3rd Evicted; Day 14	18th
Jennifer Schill	30	Linköping	Day 1	Day 10	Sent to Torpet; Day 10	17th
Selmir Hocanin	31	Stockholm	Day 1	Day 21	4th Evicted; Day 21	16th
Richard Andersson; Returned to Game	51	Stockholm	Day 1	Day 23	Sent to Torpet; Day 23	
Lili Pham	33	Gothenburg	Day 1	Day 28	5th Evicted; Day 28	15th
Erik Steffen; Returned to Game	29	Gällö	Day 1	Day 30	Sent to Torpet; Day 30	
Karin Ström; Returned to Game	32	Stockholm	Day 1	Day 30	Sent to Torpet; Day 30	
Pernilla Angeria	57	Uppsala	Day 1	Day 30	Sent to Torpet; Day 30	14th
Mary Enqvist	40	Stockholm	Day 1	Day 35	6th Evicted; Day 35	13th
Henrik Lindström	43	Vedum	Day 1	Day 37	Sent to Torpet; Day 37	12th
Robin Kacaniklic	32	Stockholm	Day 29	Day 42	7th Evicted; Day 42	11th
Richard Andersson	51	Stockholm	Day 1	Day 42	8th Evicted; Day 42	10th
Helena Hedqvist	27	Stallarholmen	Day 31	Day 44	Sent to Torpet; Day 44	9th
Phillip-Lloyd Rochester	27	Stockholm	Day 1	Day 49	9th Evicted; Day 49	8th
Karin Ström	32	Stockholm	Day 45	Day 56	10th Evicted; Day 56	7th
Allan Ericksson	35	Stockholm	Day 1	Day 58	11th Evicted; Day 58	6th
Philip Albinsson	26	Kristinehamn	Day 31	Day 59	12th Evicted; Day 59	5th
Malin Nyman	27	Hofors	Day 1	Day 60	13th Evicted; Day 60	4th
Erik Steffen	29	Gällö	Day 51	Day 61	14th Evicted; Day 61	3rd
Linnea Klaar	27	Eslöv	Day 1	Day 62	Runner-Up; Day 62	2nd
Daniel Tholén	42	Uppsala	Day 1	Day 62	Winner; Day 62	1st

== The game ==
Week	Farmer of the Week	1st Dueler	2nd Dueler	Evicted	Finish
1	Dag	Philip	Selmir	Philip	1st Evicted; Day 7
1	Dag	Allan	Robin	Robin	2nd Evicted; Day 7
2	Selmir	Dag		Dag	3rd Evicted; Day 14
3		Selmir	Phillip-Lloyd	Selmir	4th Evicted; Day 21
4	Mary				5th Evicted; Day 28
