= Dublin Penny Journal =

Weekly newspaper in Dublin, Ireland from 1832–1836

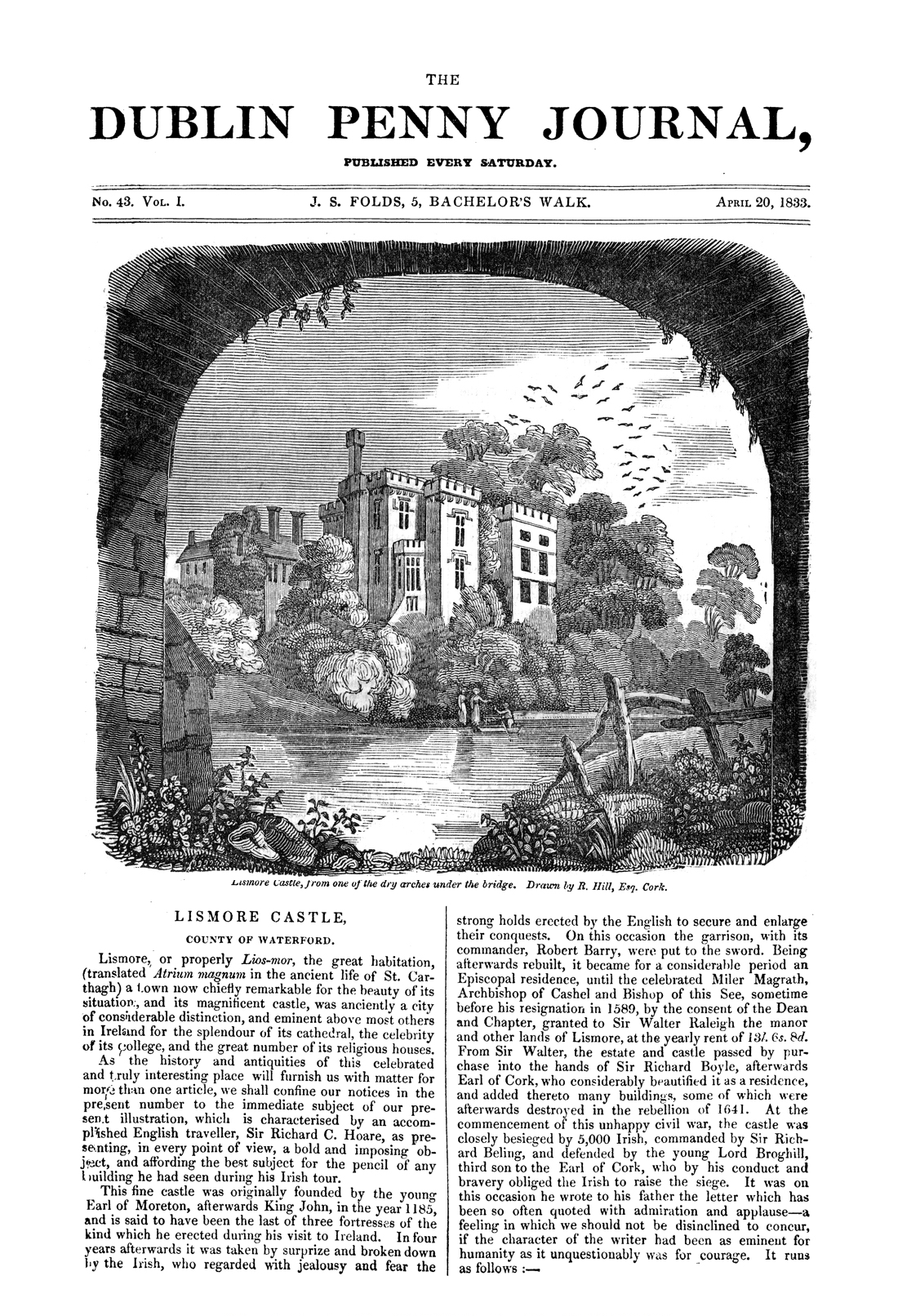
- Front page of issue of 20 April 1833
- Type: Weekly newspaper
- Format: Broadsheet
- Owner(s): John S. Folds, George Petrie and Caesar Otway
- Founded: 30 June 1832
- Ceased publication: 25 June 1836
- Language: English
- Headquarters: 5 Bachelor's Walk, Dublin
- City: Dublin
- Country: Ireland

The Dublin Penny Journal was a weekly newspaper, and later series of published volumes, originating from Dublin, Ireland, between 1832 and 1836. Published each Saturday, by J. S. Folds, George Petrie, and Caesar Otway, the Penny Journal concerned itself with matters of Irish history, legend, topography, and Irish identity, and was illustrated with a number of maps and woodcuts. While originally a paper of low circulation – numbering only a few thousand in its first edition – the Penny Journal's popularity led to increased production. By the cessation of publication in 1836, 206 works had been published in four volumes, and were sold wholesale in London, Liverpool, Manchester, Birmingham, Edinburgh, Glasgow, New York City, Philadelphia, Boston, and Paris.

== History ==
The first edition of the Dublin Penny Journal was published on 30 June 1832, three years after Catholic emancipation had culminated in the Roman Catholic Relief Act 1829. It featured on its front page an illustration of "The Custom House and Harbour of Dublin" and its first article, "Historical Notice of the City of Dublin". Other articles of the first publication included "the Age of Brass", "Agriculture", "A Visit to the Gardens of the Zoological Society of Dublin", "Account of a Pestilence that raged in Ireland in the Year 1348" written by John Clyn, a friar from Kilkenny, and a collection of "Legends and Stories of Ireland". The next 26 publications were printed through until 29 December, forming 216 pages of journal that would be assembled into the first of four volumes by 25 June 1833. The inclusion of several pieces of Irish culture, heritage and legend attracted a number of nationalist works; including Terence O'Toole's National Emblems, which opened the second publication on 7 July with "Sir - Your wood-cut is, to my apprehension, as full of meaning to an Irishman, as any emblematic device I have seen. It represents peculiar marks or tokens or Ireland, which are dear to my soul". The preface to the first volume of all publications between 1832 and 1833 discussed that the volumes were "calculated to effect a public good... by exciting a national and concordant feeling in a country in which there is, as yet, so much of discord and party". By 1833 the journal had expanded to include more writers, such as C. P. Meehan, Philip Dixon Hardy, James Clarence Mangan, and John O'Donovan. Mangan in particular worked to translate German sources for the journal, and wrote letters under a pseudonym discussing the difficulties of the Irish language.

The Dublin Penny Journal continued to publish volumes until 1836. From the 53rd publication on 6 July 1833, a second volume was compiled – containing all publications from then to the 104th on 28 June 1834. This was published in June 1834 from the newly acquired Penny Journal Office in Dublin, and featured a harp and crown on the cover, cast above various items of Irish symbolism, including weapons and shamrocks. Numbers 105–156; 5 July 1834 – 27 June 1835 respectively, formed the third volume of the Penny Journal in June 1835, covered with another harp and other Irish symbolism and under the editor Philip Dixon Hardy. The preface took note of comments by Henry Brougham, then Lord High Chancellor of England, that an inexpensive journal could not be produced for widespread circulation, and made point to state "we have performed it". Numbers 157 to 208, between 4 July 1835 and 25 June 1836, formed the fourth and final volume.

== See also ==
- List of newspapers in Ireland
