= Farmen 2020 (Sweden) =

- Genre: Reality Show
- Presented by: Paolo Roberto
- Country of origin: Sweden
- Original language: Swedish

Original release
- Network: TV4
- Release: 5 January – 15 March 2020

Related
- Farmen 2019; Farmen 2021

Farmen 2020 (The Farm 2020) is the thirteenth season of the Swedish version of The Farm reality television show. 19 contestants arrived on the farm where they have to complete tasks in order to help win equipment and food. Each week, two contestants are chosen to duel where the winner remains and the loser has to leave the farm. The show premiered on 5 January 2020 on TV4.

== Format ==
Contestants from all across Sweden are chosen to live on a farm like it was 100 years ago. Every week, one contestant is designated to be the head of the farm. They must choose someone to take part in a duel. The person chosen for the duel then selects someone of the same gender to compete against them in the duel where the loser is kicked out of the farm. Starting in week two, the contestant who was evicted from the farm decides who the new head of the farm shall be.

== Finishing order ==
(age are stated at time of competition)

Contestant	Age	Residence	Entered	Exited	Status	Finish
Sussi Olssen	20	Stockholm	Day 1	Day 7	1st Evicted; Day 7	19th
Mergim Qoqaj; Returned to Farm	26	Smålandsstenar	Day 1	Day 12	2nd Evicted; Day 12	
Simon Axelsson; Returned to Farm	25	Enköping	Day 1	Day 18	Sent to Torpet; Day 18	
Madeleine Svedelius	40	Eskilstuna	Day 1	Day 18	Sent to Torpet; Day 18	18th
Patrik Alm	55	Oslo, Norway	Day 1	Day 23	3rd Evicted; Day 23	17th
Erika Bergholm	41	Gothenburg	Day 1	Day 27	Sent to Torpet; Day 27	16th
Johanna Ågren; Returned to Farm	29	Stockholm	Day 1	Day 27	Sent to Torpet; Day 27	
Anette Olsson	67	Helsingborg	Day 1	Day 29	4th Evicted; Day 29	15th
Fredrik Andersson; Returned to Farm	21	Grästorp	Day 1	Day 31	Sent to Torpet; Day 31	
Johan Skattberg	28	Stockholm	Day 1	Day 35	5th Evicted; Day 35	14th
Esmeralda Gyllensvärd	28	Växjö	Day 1	Day 37	Sent to Torpet; Day 37	13th
Linnéa Åkesson; Returned to Farm	28	Olofström	Day 1	Day 37	Sent to Torpet; Day 37	
Jean-Luc Martin	48	Lessebo	Day 1	Day 37	Sent to Torpet; Day 37	12th
Momma Merzi	30	Karlshamn	Day 1	Day 41	6th Evicted; Day 41	11th
Haroon Johansson; Returned to Farm	53	Kattarp	Day 1	Day 43	Sent to Torpet; Day 43	
Mergim Qoqaj; Returned to Farm	26	Smålandsstenar	Day 29	Day 45	Sent to Torpet; Day 45	
Eleonora Gustafsson	57	Arboga	Day 1	Day 48	Sent to Torpet; Day 48	10th
Linnéa Åkesson	28	Olofström	Day 43	Day 50	Ejected; Day 50	9th
Simon Axelsson	25	Enköping	Day 31	Day 53	7th Evicted; Day 53	8th
Mergim Qoqaj	26	Smålandsstenar	Day 48	Day 58	8th Evicted; Day 58	7th
Haroon Johansson	53	Kattarp	Day 55	Day 61	9th Evicted; Day 61	6th
Jens Rönnqvist	31	Nordmaling	Day 1	Day 63	10th Evicted; Day 63	5th
Peter Bysell	42	Strängnäs	Day 1	Day 64	11th Evicted; Day 64	4th
Fredrik Andersson	21	Grästorp	Day 37	Day 65	12th Evicted; Day 65	3rd
Johanna Ågren	29	Stockholm	Day 37	Day 66	Runner-up; Day 66	2nd
Sofie Hodén	29	Stockholm	Day 1	Day 66	Winner; Day 66	1st

== The game ==
Week	Farmer of the Week	1st Dueler	2nd Dueler	Evicted	Finish
1	Anette	Sofie	Sussi	Sussi	1st Evicted; Day 7
2		Mergim	Fredrik	Mergim	2nd Evicted; Day 12
3	Momma	All	All	Simon & Madeleine	Sent to Torpet; Day 18
4					3rd Evicted; Day 23
