= Sankt Olof =

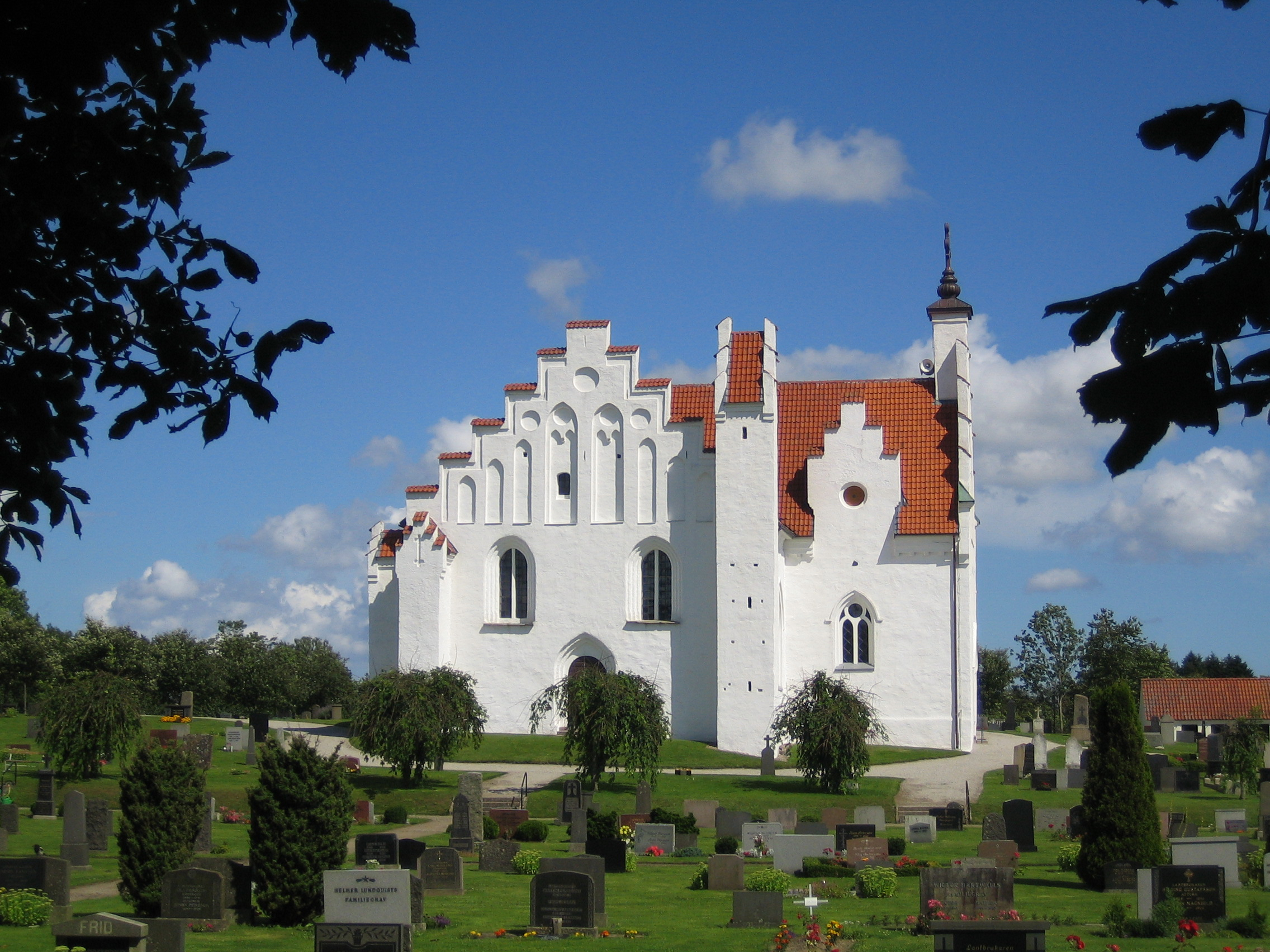
- Sankt Olof church

- Location within Skåne Location within Sweden
- Coordinates: 55°38′N 14°08′E
- Country: Sweden
- Province: Skåne
- County: Skåne County
- Municipality: Simrishamn Municipality

Area
  - Total: 0.73 km^{2} (0.28 sq mi)

Population (31 December 2010)
  - Total: 624
  - Density: 850/km^{2} (2,200/sq mi)
- Time zone: UTC+1 (CET)
  - Summer (DST): UTC+2 (CEST)

Sankt Olof is a locality situated in Simrishamn Municipality, Skåne County, Sweden; it had 624 inhabitants in 2010.

Sankt Olof is a village located 15 miles northwest of Simrishamn. The village is named after the church, which in its turn is named after Olaf II of Norway; the village was originally called Lunkende.
