= Coole Upper Churches =

- Teampaill na Cúile Uachtaraí
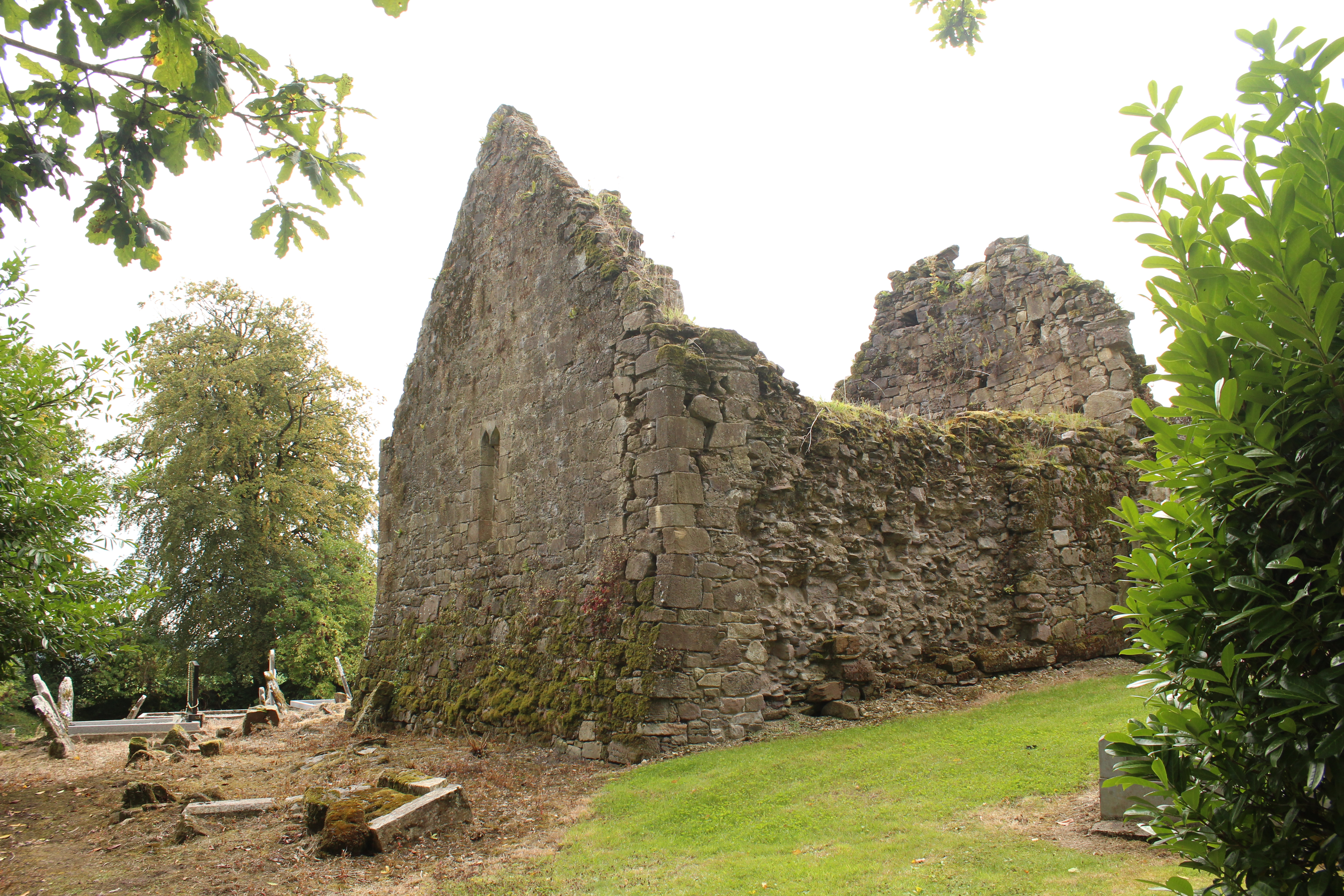
- "New" church at Coole

- Location within Ireland
- 52.108864°N 8.204076°W
- Location: Coole Upper, Fermoy, County Cork
- Country: Ireland
- Denomination: Church of Ireland
- Previous denomination: Catholic

Architecture
- Functional status: inactive

Administration
- Diocese: Cloyne

National monument of Ireland
- Official name: Coole Upper
- Reference no.: 395

Coole Upper Churches are medieval churches forming a National Monument in County Cork, Ireland.

== Location ==
Coole Upper Churches are located 2.9 km (1.8 mi) northeast of Castlelyons.

== History ==
This area is associated with two saints, Abbán and Dalbach.

The church at Coole Upper is the larger and was built in the 12th century as a single nave church and had antae.

The chancel was added in the 13th century. It has a narrow two-light ogee window in the east gable. A rosette was carved on one of the stones in the east wall.
