= Sankt Olof church =

Coordinates: 55.6350°N 14.1227°E

Saint Olaf's Church
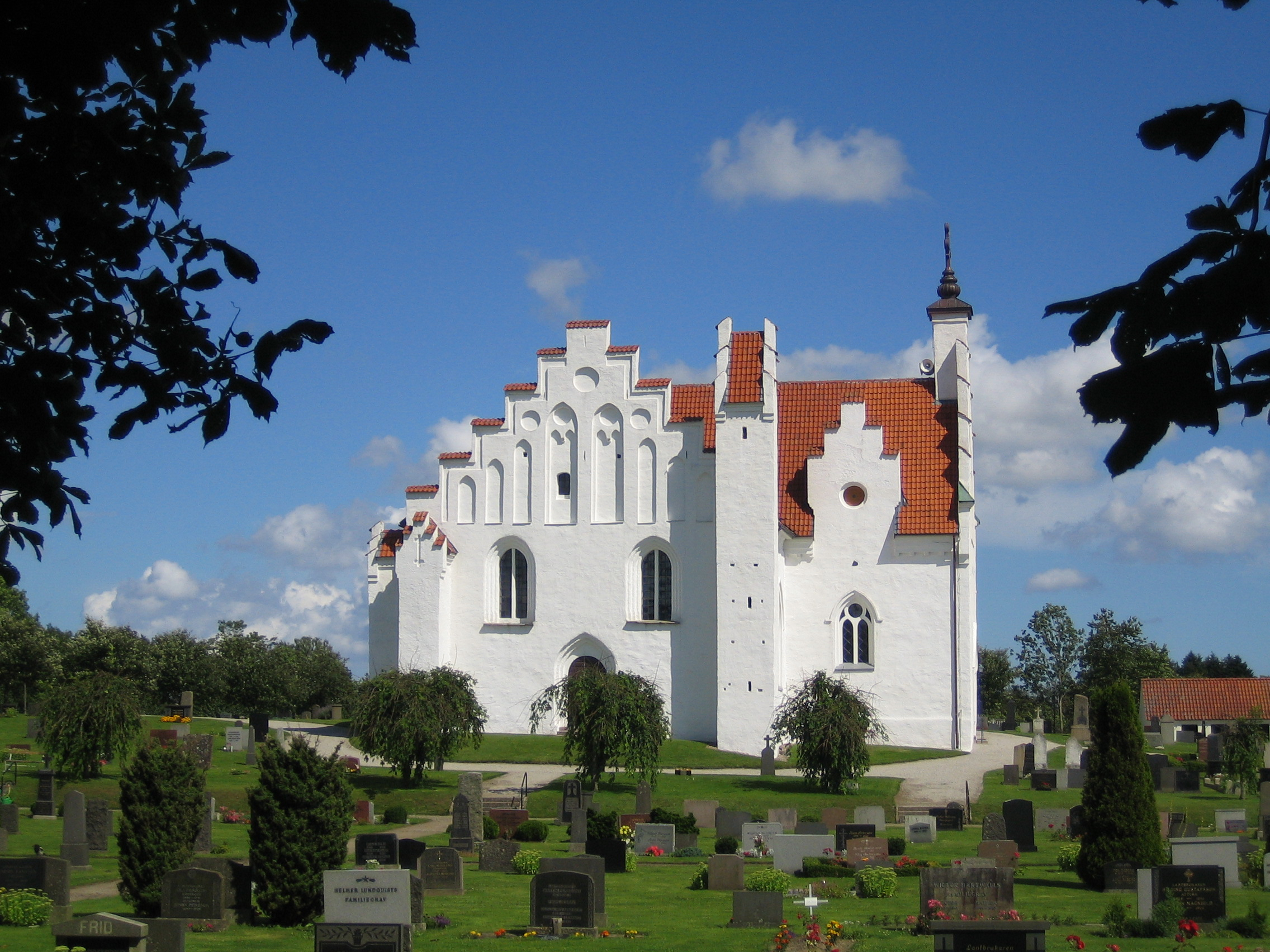
- Saint Olaf's Church in July 2007
- Saint Olaf's Church
- Location: Sankt Olof
- Country: Sweden
- Denomination: Church of Sweden

Architecture
- Completed: 13th century

Administration
- Province: Skåne County
- Diocese: Diocese of Lund
- Parish: Simrishamn Parish

Saint Olaf's Church (Swedish: Sankt Olofs kyrka) is a church building in Sankt Olof in the Österlen region. It is the parish church of Simrishamn Parish in the Diocese of Lund.

The church is a popular pilgrimage site among different Christian denominations. This is due to the ancient Saint Olaf cult and the presence of the sacrificial site Saint Olaf's Well (Sankt Olofs källa) in Sankt Olof. The village was originally called Lunkende By, but since the church was Denmark's largest shrine dedicated to Saint Olaf, the original name was eventually forgotten, and the entire village adopted the name of the church.

== Church building ==
The church was originally built in the early Middle Ages. The nave with two aisles was constructed in the 15th century, possibly due to an increasing number of pilgrims. In the 1870s, the church underwent a restoration led by Helgo Zettervall.

== Furnishings ==
In the past, there were said to be nine altars in the church. Today, five of the saint statues remain preserved.

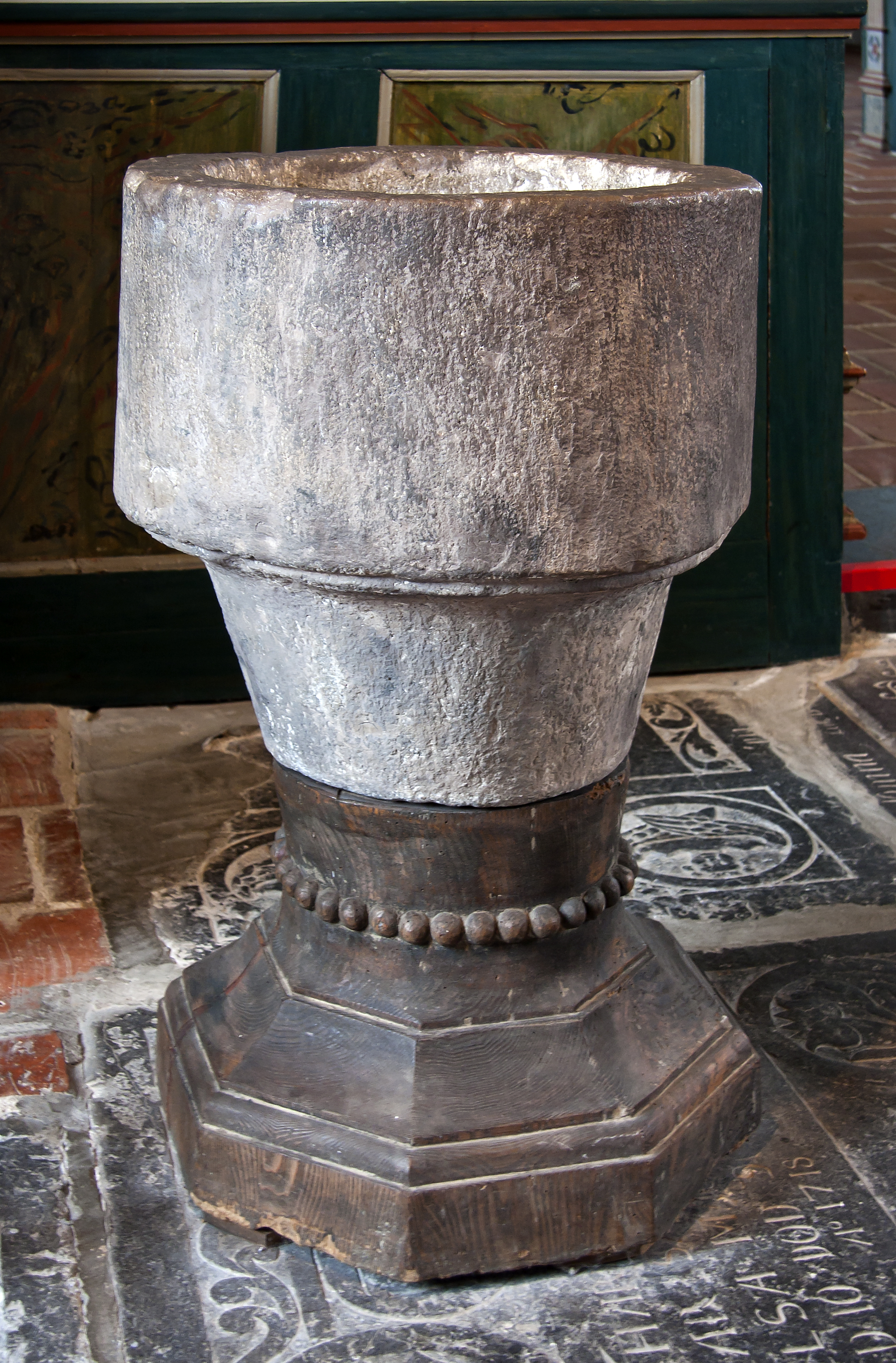
The baptismal font.

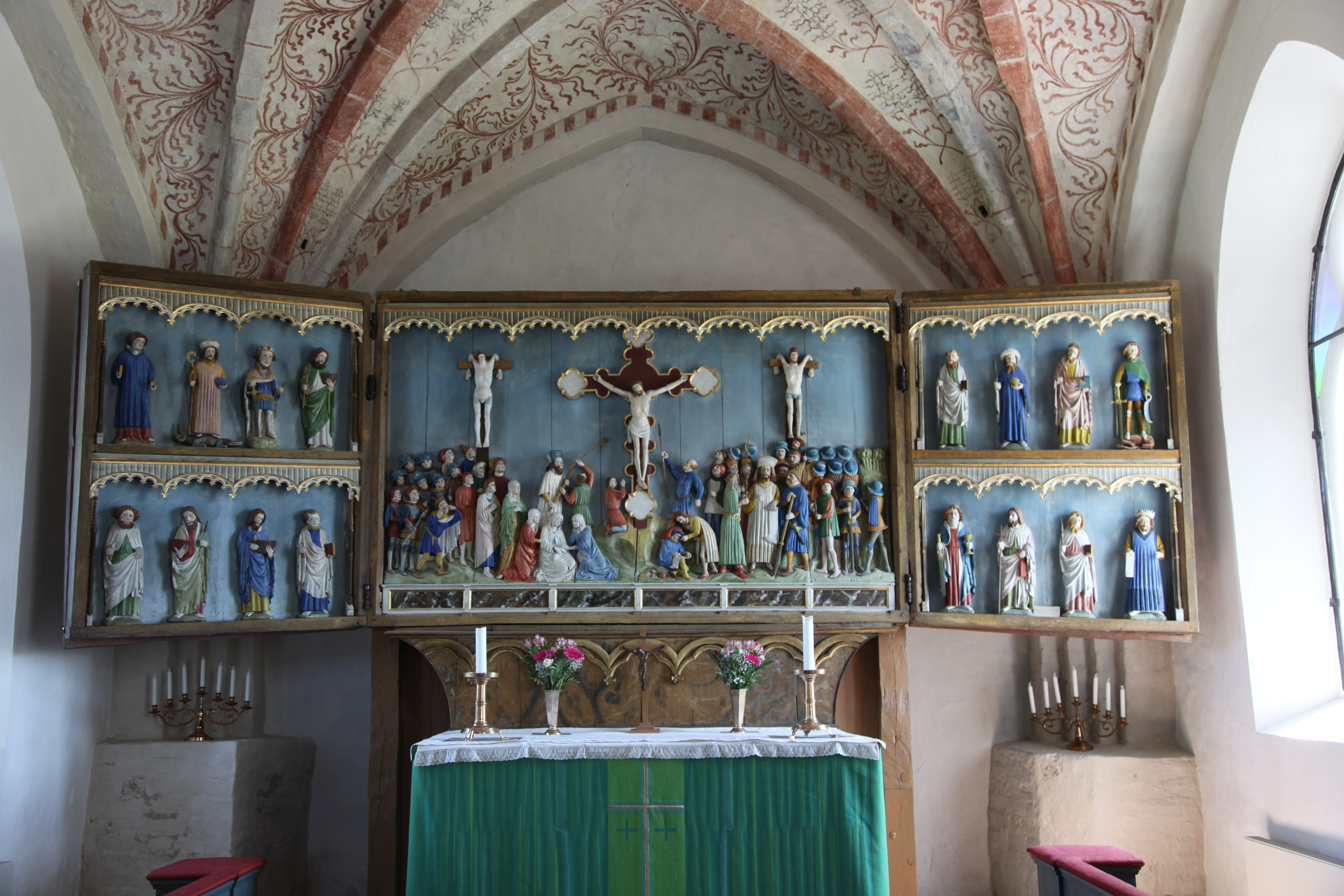
A triptych in the chancel.

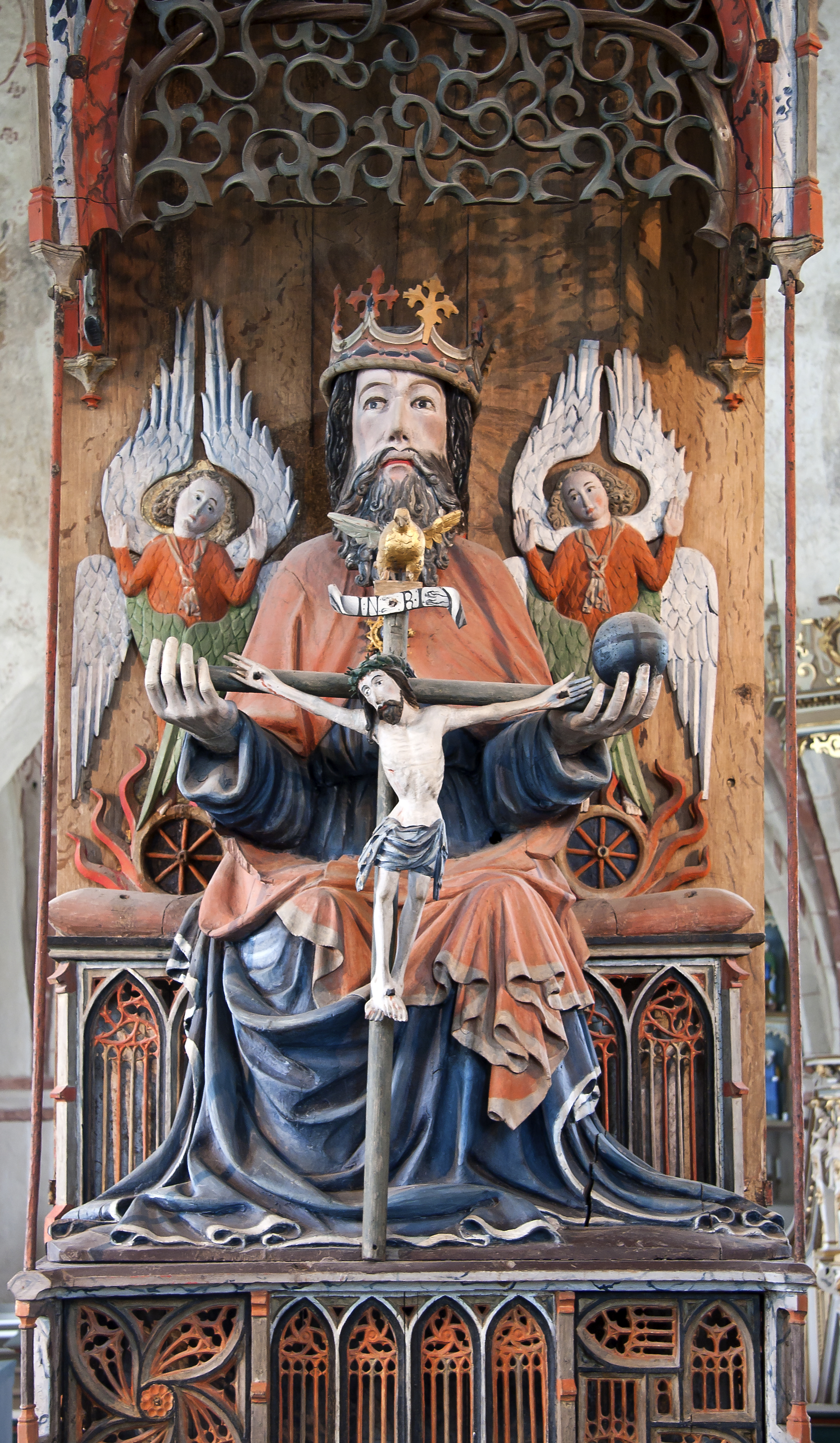
A sculpture of the Holy Trinity.

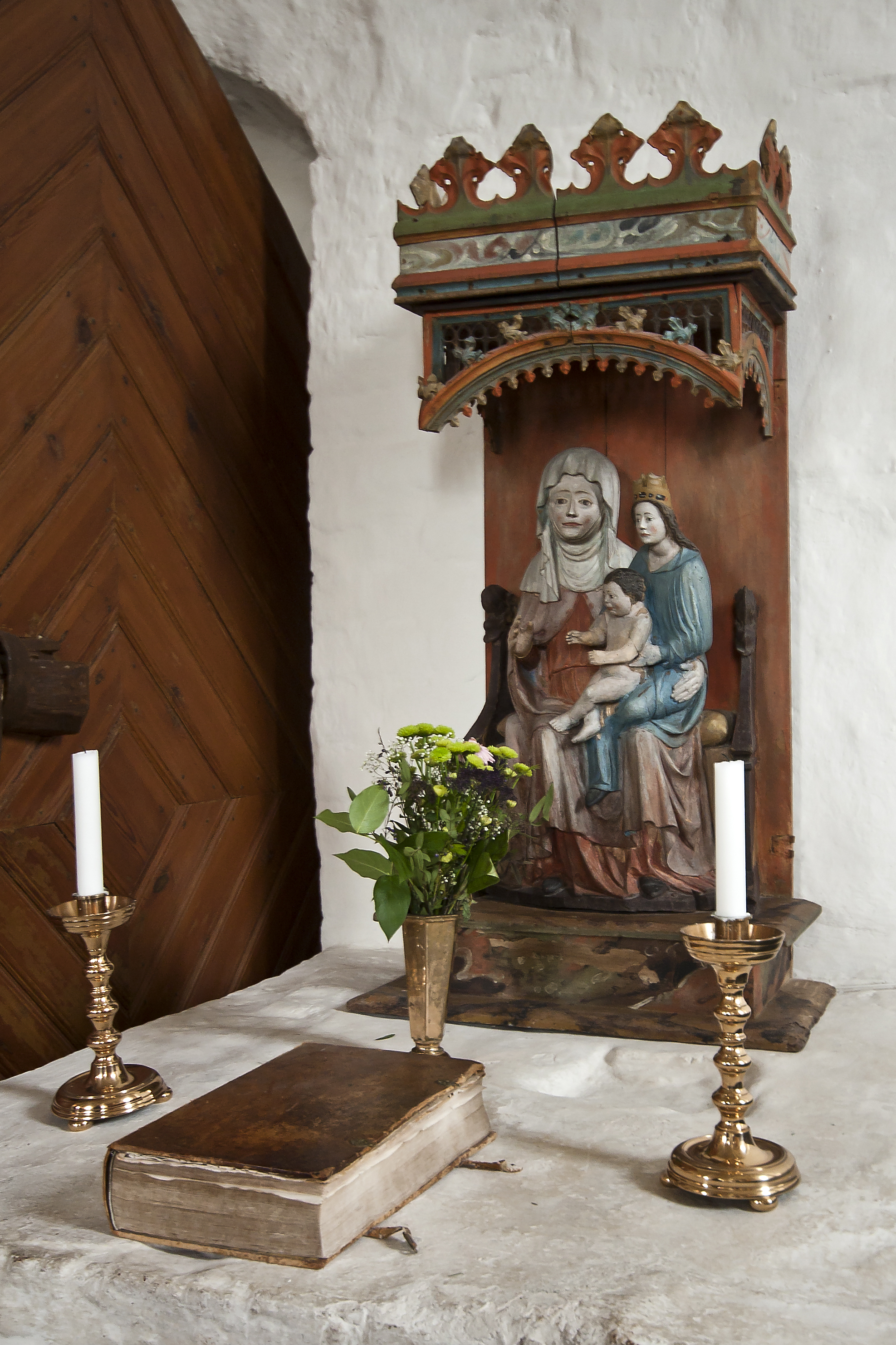
Altar dedicated to Saint Anne, mother of Mary.

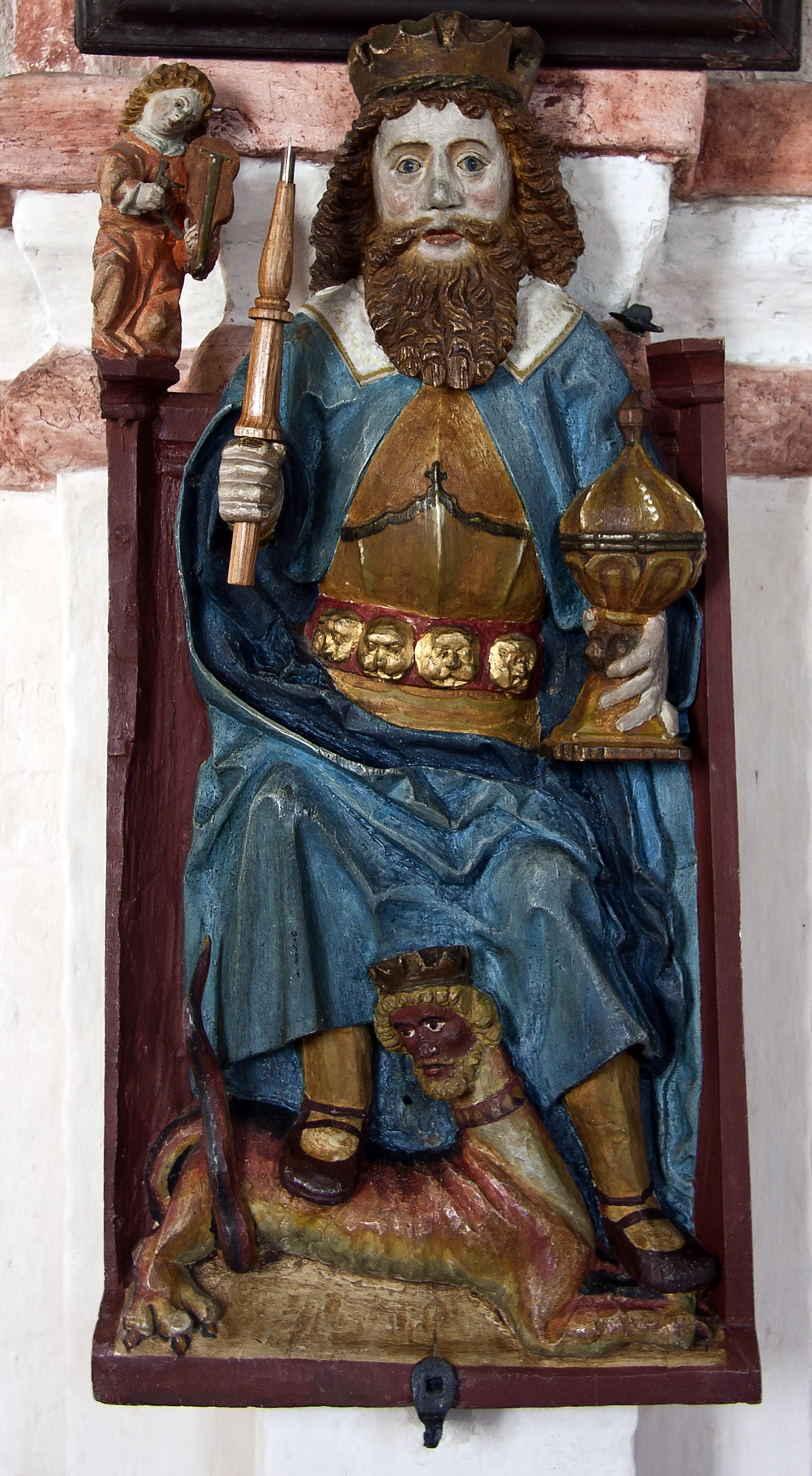
Saint Olaf.

== Literature ==
- Kyrkor i Skåne (Churches in Skåne), pages 120–127, Siegrun Fernlund, 1980, ISBN 91-85330-26-4
