= Farmen 2019 (Sweden) =

- Genre: Reality Show
- Presented by: Paolo Roberto
- Country of origin: Sweden
- Original language: Swedish

Original release
- Network: TV4
- Release: 6 January – 17 March 2019

Related
- Farmen VIP; Farmen 2020

Farmen 2019 (The Farm 2019) was the 12th season of the Swedish version of The Farm reality television show. The show premiered on 6 January 2019 on TV4. The season concluded on 17 March 2019 when Tobias Möller won against Emelie Karlsson in a final duel to become this year's farmer.

== Format ==
Contestants from all across Sweden are chosen to live on a farm like it was 100 years ago. Every week, one contestant is designated to be the head of the farm. They must choose someone to take part in a duel. The person is chosen for the duel then selects someone of the same gender to compete against them in the duel where the loser is kicked out of the farm. Starting in week two, the contestant who was evicted from the farm decides who the new head of the farm shall be.

== Finishing order ==
(ages stated are at time of contest)

Contestant	Age	Residence	Entered	Exited	Status	Finish
Alexander Hoffström	26	Gothenburg	Day 1	Day 3	Left Competition; Day 3	17th
Inger Johansson	51	Karlskrona	Day 1	Day 5	Left Competition; Day 5	16th
Kim Graversen; Returned to Game	48	Värnamo	Day 1	Day 7	1st Evicted; Day 7	
Stina Öberg; Returned to Game	25	Stockholm	Day 1	Day 14	2nd Evicted; Day 14	
Maria Bjärkeden	52	Gävle	Day 1	Day 18	Ejected; Day 18	15th
Rasmus Dangardt	25	Halmstad	Day 1	Day 21	3rd Evicted; Day 21	14th
Alexander Rovira	25	Rotebro	Day 1	Day 22	Left Competition; Day 22	13th
Göran Söderlund	65	Sundsvall/Stockholm	Day 1	Day 28	4th Evicted; Day 28	12th
Mahsa Farajollahi	29	Gothenburg	Day 1	Day 35	5th Evicted; Day 35	11th
Rocco Milanović	64	Västerås	Day 29	Day 38	Left Competition; Day 38	10th
Therese Wendesten	27	Hönö	Day 23	Day 42	6th Evicted; Day 42	9th
Tobias Möller; Returned to Game	27	Eslöv	Day 23	Day 49	7th Evicted; Day 49	
Kim Graversen	48	Värnamo	Day 1 Day 29	Day 7 Day 56	8th Evicted; Day 56	8th
Diana Sundström	37	Stockholm	Day 1	Day 60	Ejected; Day 60	7th
Stina Öberg	25	Stockholm	Day 1 Day 57	Day 14; Day 63	9th Evicted; Day 63	6th
Maxine Lindin	21	Stockholm	Day 23	Day 66	10th Evicted; Day 66	5th
Neda Ameli	28	Uppsala	Day 57	Day 67	11th Evicted; Day 67	4th
Tobias Johansson	27	Fagersta	Day 1	Day 68	12th Evicted; Day 68	3rd
Emelie Karlsson	25	Vikersund, Norway	Day 1	Day 69	Runner-up; Day 69	2nd
Tobias Möller	27	Eslöv	Day 23; Day 57	Day 49; Day 69	Winner; Day 69	1st

== Torpet ==
Returning from the previous season is Torpet. This time, four new contestants start off on Torpet, trying to win a spot to get on the farm while each week facing against contestants who lost the duel on the farm, as they themselves try to win a spot back onto the farm.

Contestant	Age	Residence	Entered	Exited	Status	Finish
Kim Graversen	48	Värnamo	Day 8	Day 10	1st Evicted; Day 13	11th
Maria Nilsson	42	Kalix	Day 1	Day 14	Left Competition; Day 14	10th
Pasi Nevalainen	45	Borås	Day 1	Day 23	2nd Evicted; Day 22,	9th
Linus Oscarsson	22	Örebro	Day 1	Day 30	3rd Evicted; Day 29	8th
Rasmus Danardt	25	Halmstad	Day 22	Day 37	4th Evicted; Day 37	7th
Therese Wendesten	27	Hönö	Day 43	Day 48	5th Evicted; Day 45	6th
Mahsa Farajollahi	29	Gothenburg	Day 36	Day 51	Left Competition; Day 47	5th
Göran Söderlund	65	Sundsvall/Stockholm	Day 29	Day 57	6th Evicted; Day 57	4th
Neda Ameli	28	Uppsala	Day 1	Day 57	Entered Farm; Day 57	1st-3rd
Stina Öberg	25	Stockholm	Day 15	Day 57	Returned to Farm; Day 57	1st-3rd
Tobias Möller	27	Eslöv	Day 50	Day 57	Returned to Farm; Day 57	1st-3rd

== The game ==
Week	Farmer of the Week	1st Dueler	2nd Dueler	Evicted	Finish
1			Kim	Kim	1st Evicted; Day 7
2					
