= Philip Dixon Hardy =

Irish poet, bookseller, printer and publisher

Philip Dixon Hardy (1794–1875) was an Irish poet, bookseller, printer, and publisher. He introduced the use of steam-powered printing presses in Ireland in 1833.

He was educated at Trinity College, Dublin. He edited the Dublin Penny Journal from 1833. This newspaper was published between 1832 and 1836 and issued each Saturday, by J. S. Folds, George Petrie, and Caesar Otway. He edited the Dublin Literary Gazette (later the National Magazine) and published a number of tour guides of different parts of the country.

== Selected works ==
=== Poetry ===
- Wellington (1814)
- Bertha, a Tale of Erin (1817)
- A Wreath from the Emerald Isle (1826)
- The Pleasures of Religion and Other Poems (1869)

=== Travel ===
- The Northern Tourist (1820)
- The New Picture of Dublin (1831)
- The Holy Wells of Ireland (1836)
- Hardy’s Tourists’ Guides through Ireland, In Four Tours (1858)

=== Other ===
- Legends, Tales, and Stories of Ireland (1837) Dublin: John Cumming
- The Friend of Ireland, containing an exposure of errors and superstitions of the Church of Rome [vols. 1–10] (1838–39)
- The Northern Cottage, or The Effects of Bible Reading (1842)
- Simple Memorials of an Irish Family (1843)
- The Inquisition (1849)
- The Maynooth Grant considered religiously, morally, and politically (1853)
