= Rosersberg =

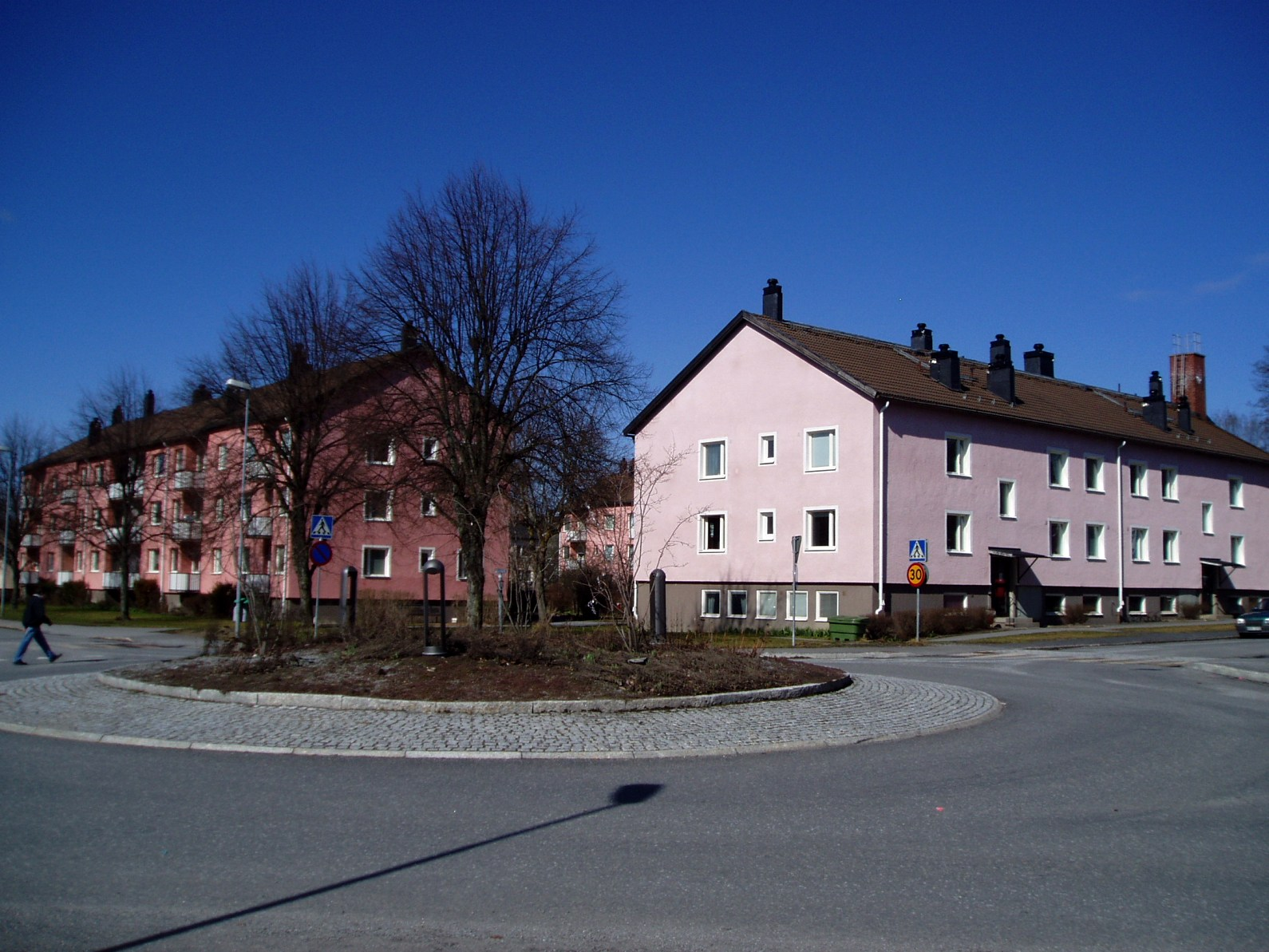

- Location within Stockholm Location within Sweden Location within European Union
- Coordinates: 59°35′N 17°53′E
- Country: Sweden
- Province: Uppland
- County: Stockholm County
- Municipality: Sigtuna Municipality

Area
  - Total: 1.84 km^{2} (0.71 sq mi)

Population (31 December 2020)
  - Total: 1,829
  - Density: 994/km^{2} (2,570/sq mi)
- Time zone: UTC+1 (CET)
  - Summer (DST): UTC+2 (CEST)

Rosersberg is a locality situated in Sigtuna Municipality, Stockholm County, Sweden with a population of 1,833 as of 2023.

== Geography & Transport ==
Rosersberg is located in the eastern part of Sigtuna Municipality in Stockholm County, near the border with Upplands Väsby. The locality lies along the Stockholm-Märsta commuter railway line and is served by Rosersberg Station, which provides direct access to Stockholm city centre. The E4 motorway passes nearby, offering road connectivity to both Arlanda Airport and central Stockholm. This strategic location has contributed to the development of Rosersberg as a node for logistics and light industry.

== Economy ==
Rosersberg's economy is influenced by its proximity to major transportation infrastructure, particularly the E4 bypass. In recent years, the area has seen significant growth in warehousing, logistics, and distribution services. Several national and international companies maintain facilities in the locality, including DHL, PostNord, and Gear4music, benefitting from efficient regional transport links and access to Greater Stockholm’s consumer and freight markets.

== Rosersberg Palace ==
Rosersberg Palace is located just outside the centre of the locality and is one of the ten Royal Palaces of Sweden. Originally constructed in the 1630s and later expanded during the 18th century, the palace served as a royal residence into the early 20th century. Today, it is managed by the National Property Board of Sweden and is open to the public for guided tours. The palace grounds include formal gardens, walking trails, and a hotel and conference centre housed within the historic estate buildings.

== Notable people ==
- Ulf Isaksson, ice hockey player
- Håkan Södergren, ice hockey player
