= Örby, Kinna =

Settlement in Mark Municipality, Sweden

Coordinates: 57.48520°N 12.69270°E

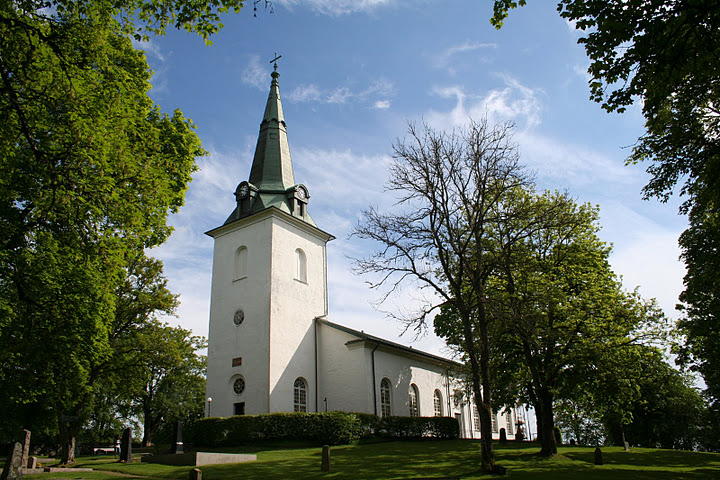
Örby church in Västra Götaland

Örby is a part of the town Kinna in Mark Municipality, Västra Götaland County, Sweden. The area has about 2,000 inhabitants and was formerly a locality of its own, but has grown together with Kinna.

Örby is the home of sports club IFK Örby.
