= Anna Brolin =

Swedish television host (born 1980)

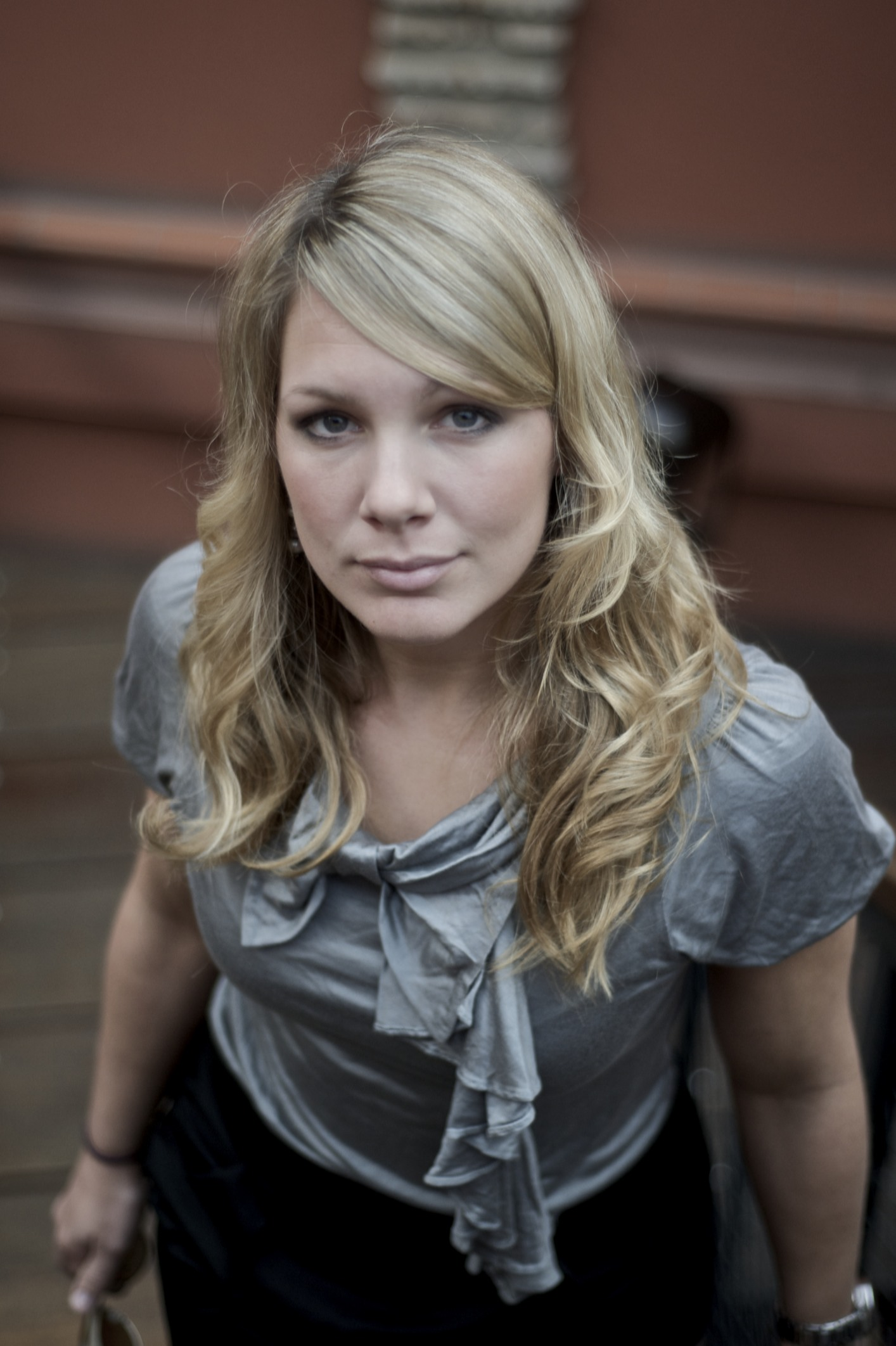
- Brolin in 2010
- Born: Anna Eleonora Brolin; 1980 (age 45–46); Stockholm, Sweden
- Occupations: Television presenter; sports journalist
- Spouse: Jesper Rodhborn (m. 2013; div. 2022)
- Children: 2
- Relatives: Åke Brolin (uncle)

Anna Eleonora Brolin (born 1980) is a Swedish sports reporter and sport-television presenter. Brolin has worked for Viasat Sport and TV4.

Born in Stockholm, Brolin is the sister of the male model Carl Brolin, but is not related to the footballer Tomas Brolin. In the summer of 2010, she was selected for TV4's World Cup squad and reported on site from the World Cup in South Africa. Brolin participated as a contestant in Let's Dance 2013. She was present in Brazil as one of the presenters on TV4 during the 2014 FIFA World Cup. In 2016, she took over as host of Biggest Loser. In 2020, she was appointed program manager for the Farmen. She succeeded Paolo Roberto.
