= Birger Persson =

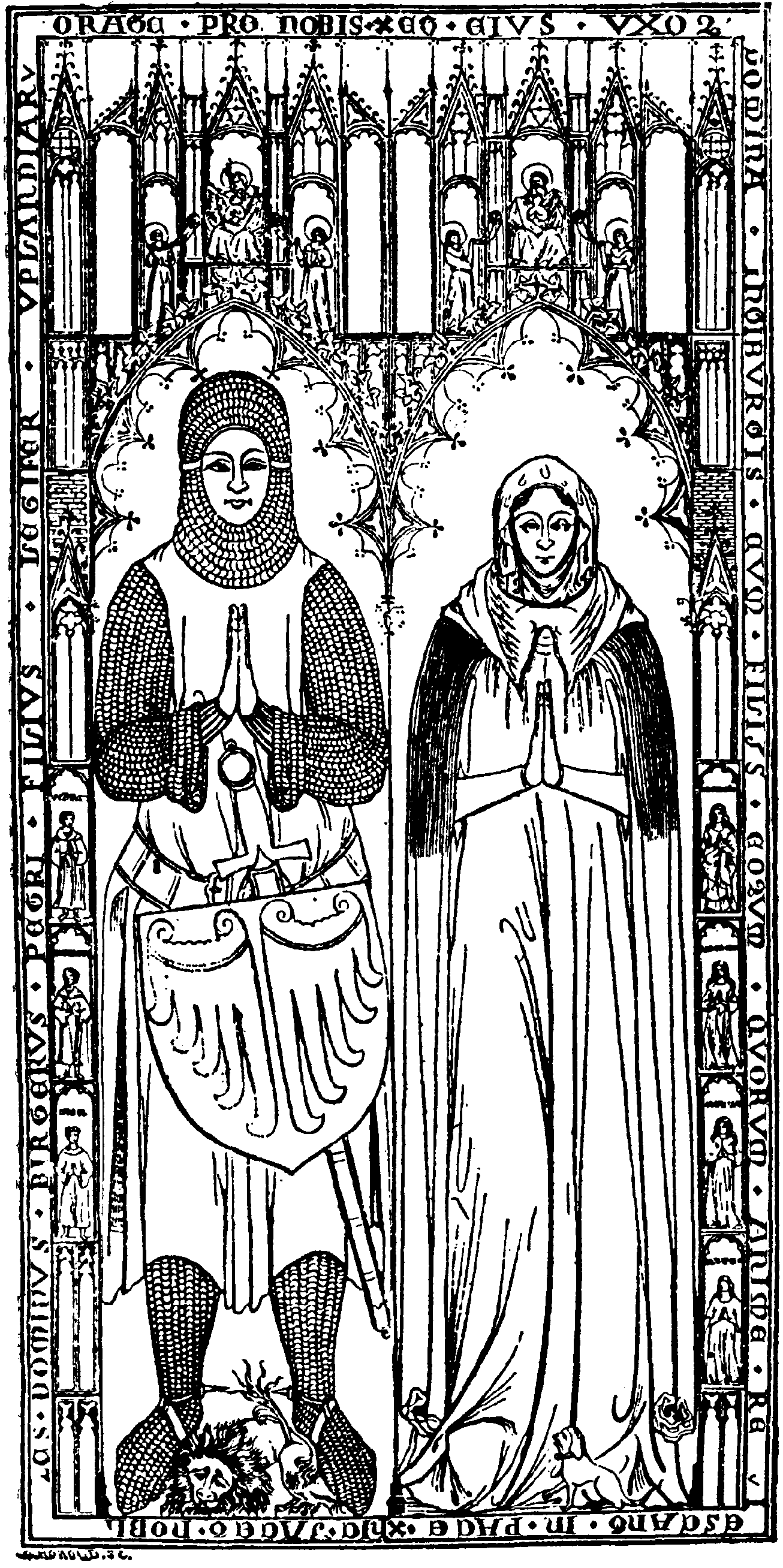
Herr Birger Persson of Finsta, Lady Ingeborg and their children's tombstone in Uppsala Cathedral.

Herr Birger Persson (sometimes Petersson) of Finsta (??? - 3 April 1327) was a Swedish magnate, knight, privy councillor and Uppland's first lawspeaker.

His father was the knight Pehr Israelsson of Uppland, while his first wife was Kristina Johansdotter (d. 1293), a niece of Saint Ingrid of Skännige. His second marriage to Ingeborg Bengtsdotter of the Folkunga family produced the nun and mystic, Saint Bridget of Sweden.

He was a co-drafter of the Law of Uppland. Birger is portrayed with several coats of arms: his tombstone in Uppsala Cathedral shows his shield with two lowered wings close together, without large gaps. His seal in mediaeval letters shows two wings, with an upper base, well-separated at large intervals, between a six-leaved rose, which hangs in a garland-like object.
