= Adoration of the Shepherds (Schongauer) =

Painting by Martin Schongauer

The Adoration of the Shepherds
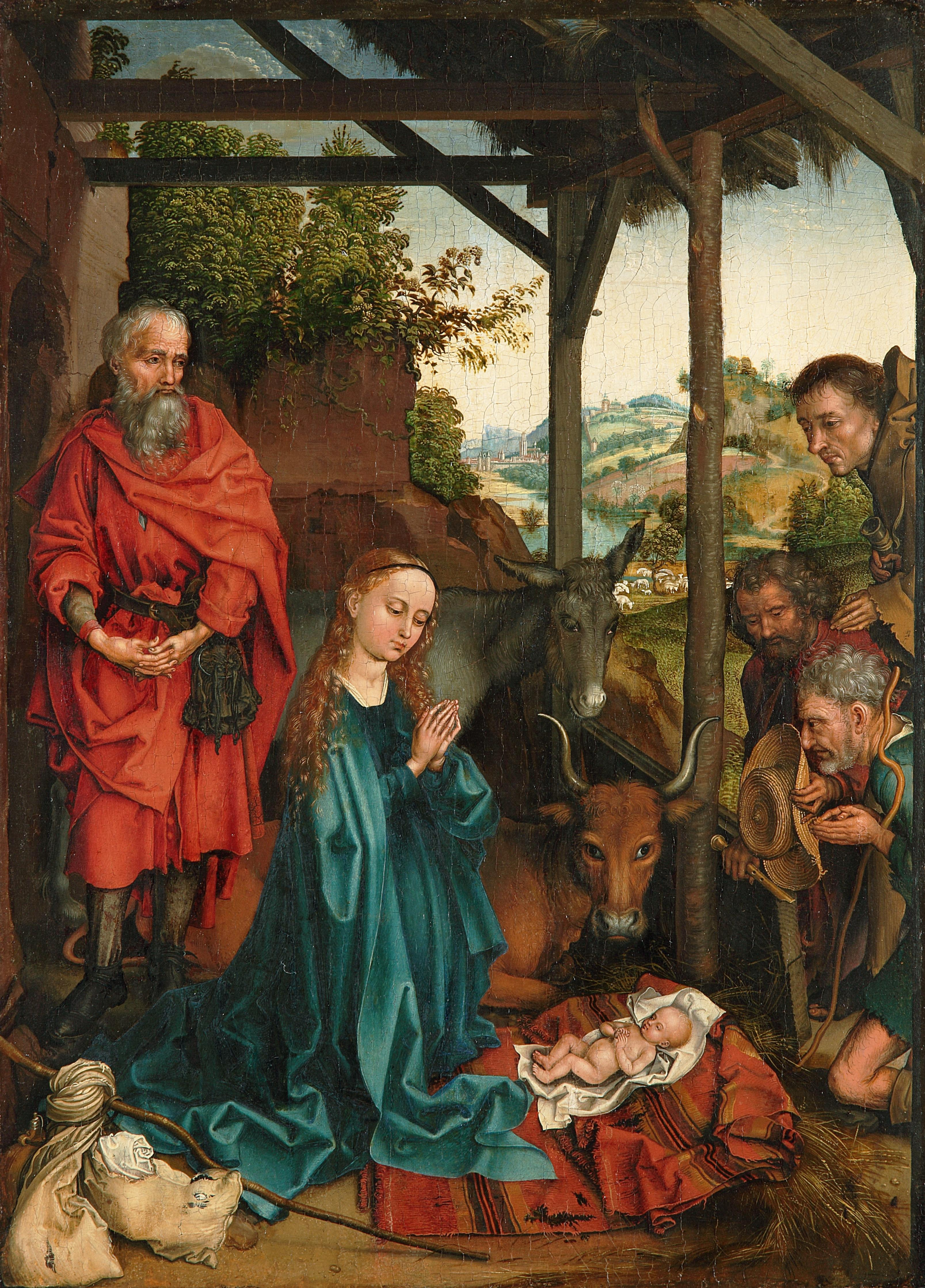
- Artist: Martin Schongauer
- Year: c. 1480
- Medium: Oil on panel
- Dimensions: 37.5 cm × 28 cm (14.8 in × 11 in)
- Location: Gemäldegalerie; Berlin

The Adoration of the Shepherds is an oil painting on panel of c. 1480 by the Colmar painter-engraver Martin Schongauer. It is in the Gemäldegalerie in Berlin.

== Description ==
The scene is the Adoration of the Shepherds. Mary kneels before her child, who lies on swaddling clothes. Behind her are Joseph standing with an ox and a donkey, and facing her are three shepherds who lean forward towards the Christ Child.

The iconography closely resembles the revelations of Bridget of Sweden which were still popular in Schongauer's time a century after she wrote them. This includes the elderly features of Joseph contrasted with the youthful features of the Virgin, her praying hands, her loose blond curly hair, and the miraculously clean and painless birth with the child sprouting spontaneously from its kneeling mother's womb keeping her virginity intact with no visible umbilical cord or afterbirth.

Schongauer was probably influenced by the work of Flemish painters such as Rogier van der Weyden and Hans Memling which he had seen on trips to Spain or Flanders. In turn his placement of the figures was an influence on later painters such as Albrecht Dürer and Hans Burgkmair the Elder.

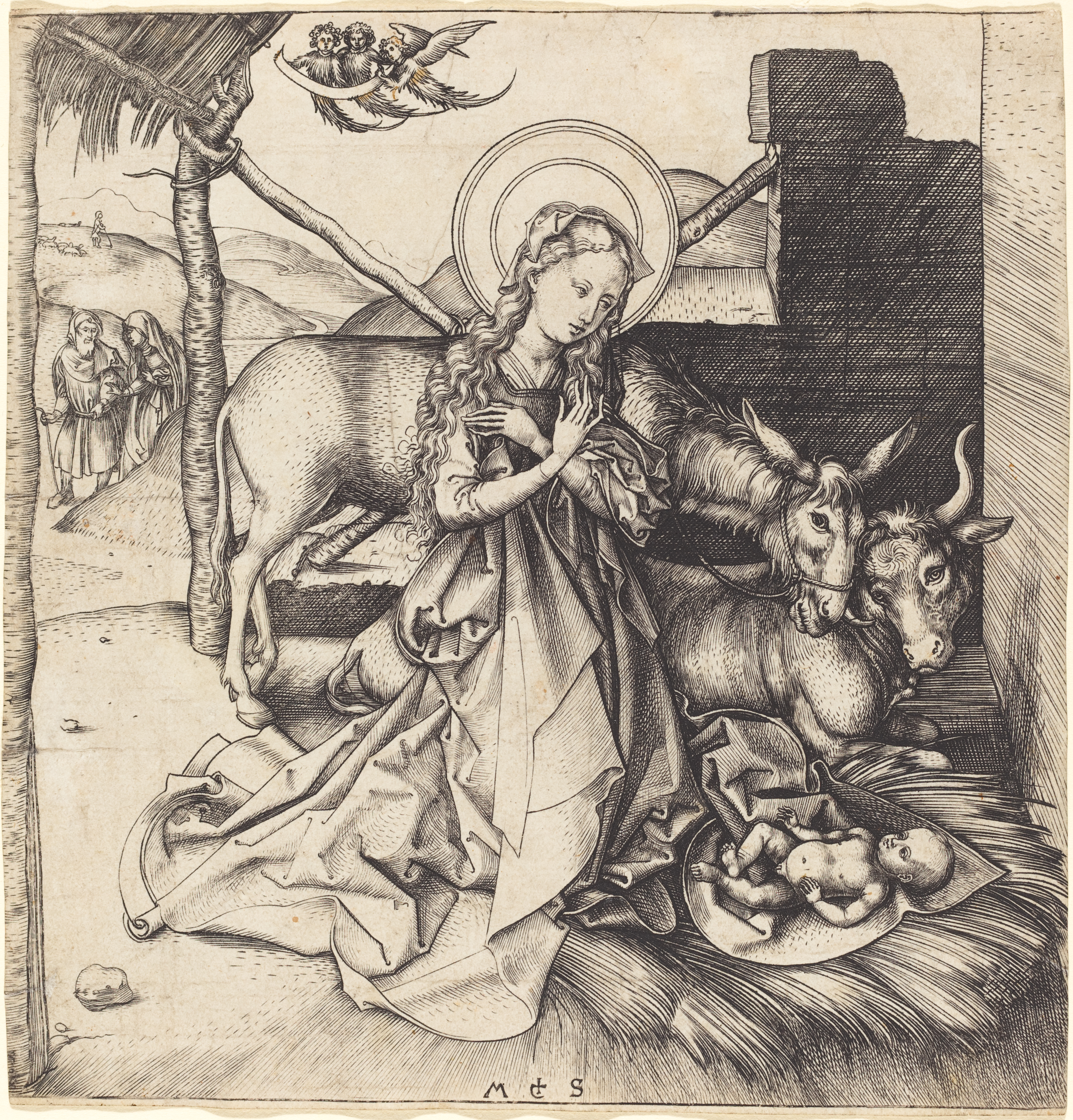
Small nativity, engraving by Schongauer

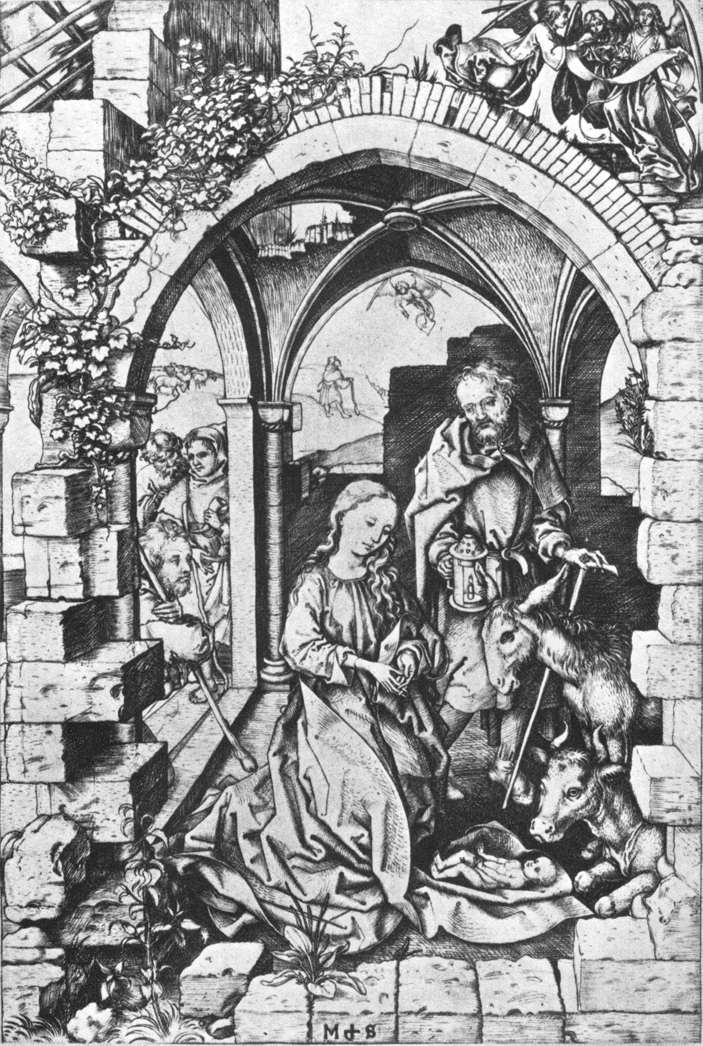
Large nativity, engraving by Schongauer

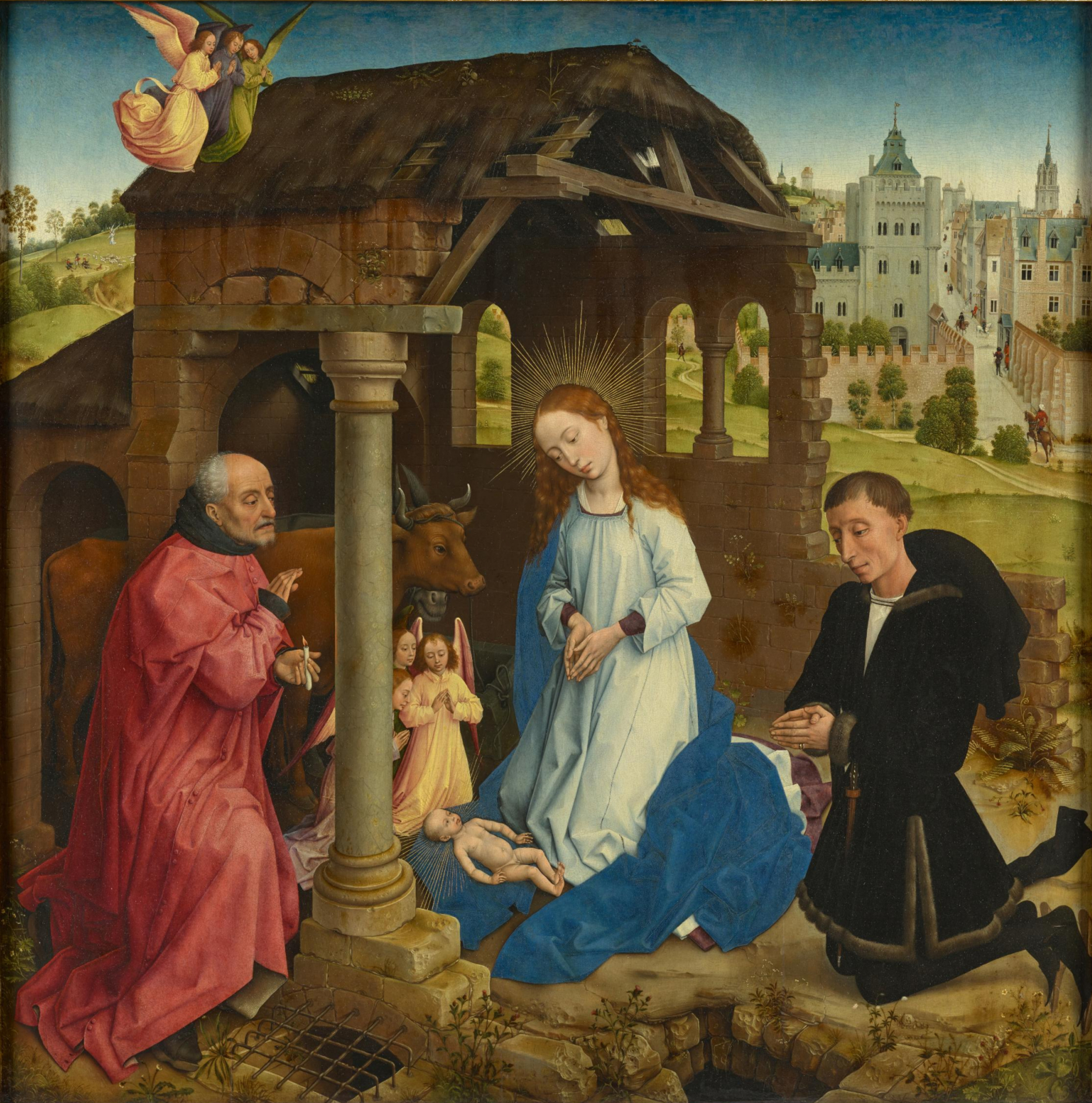
Nativity by Rogier van der Weyden about 30 years earlier

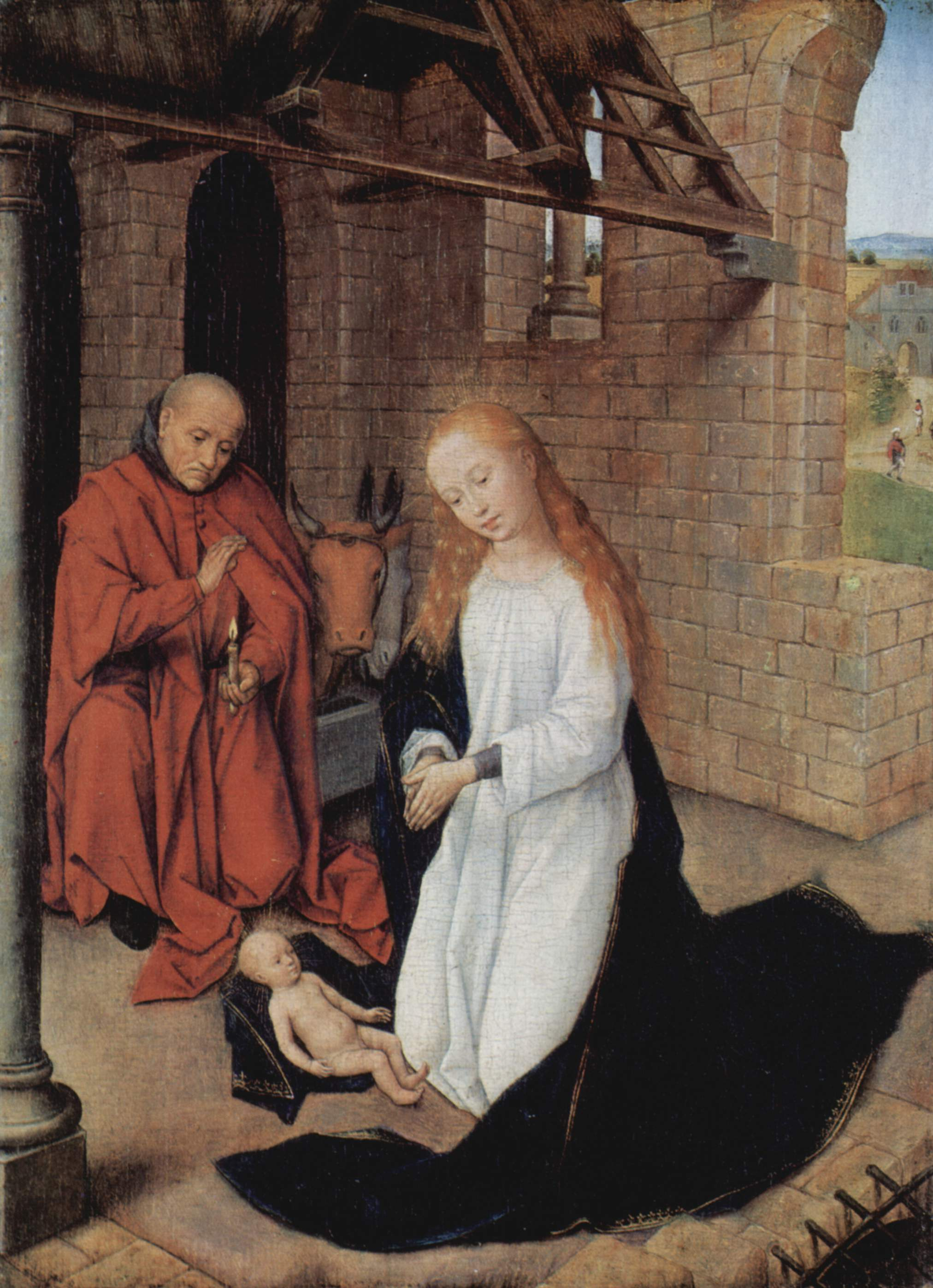
Nativity by Hans Memling about 10 years earlier

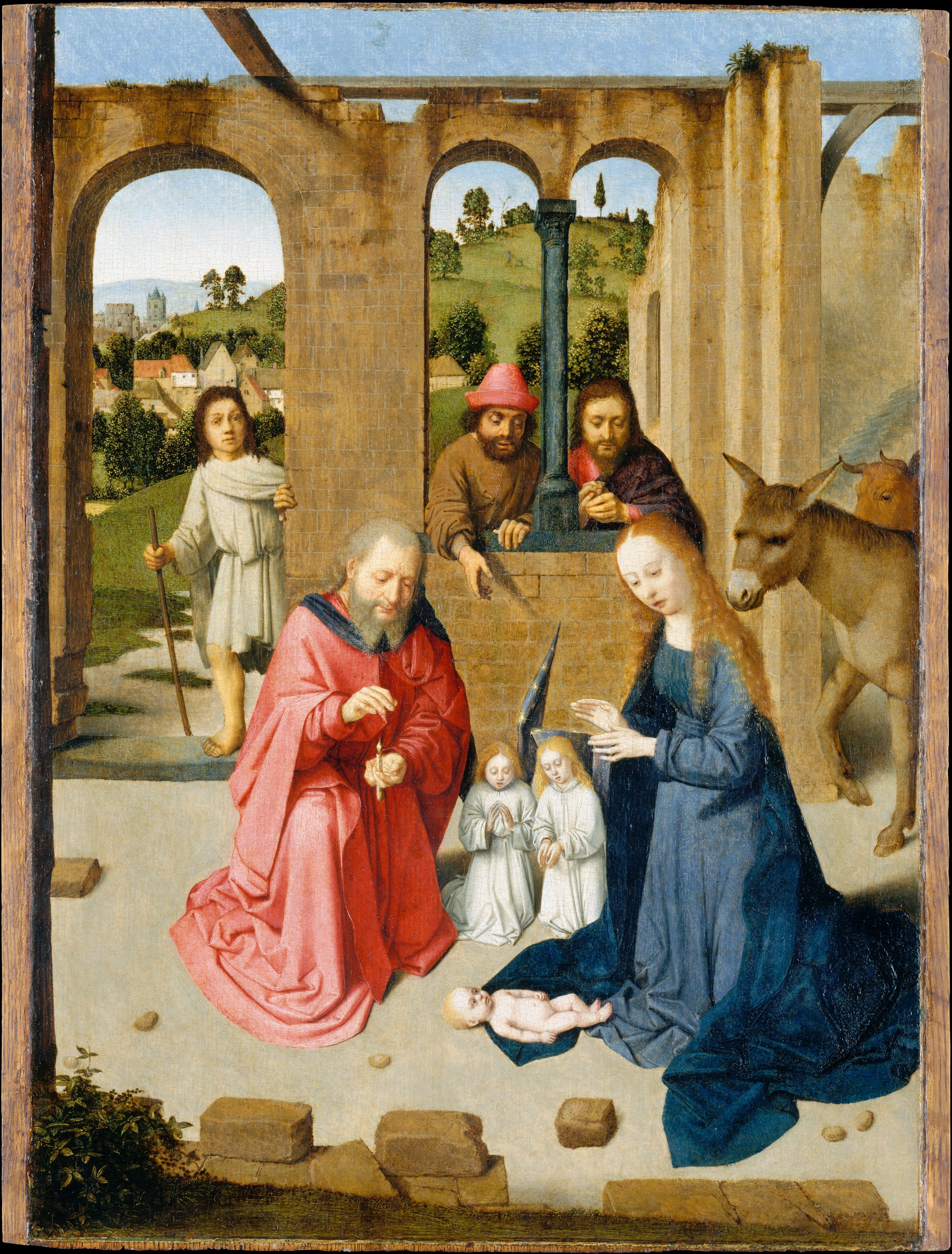
Nativity by Gerard David about the same time

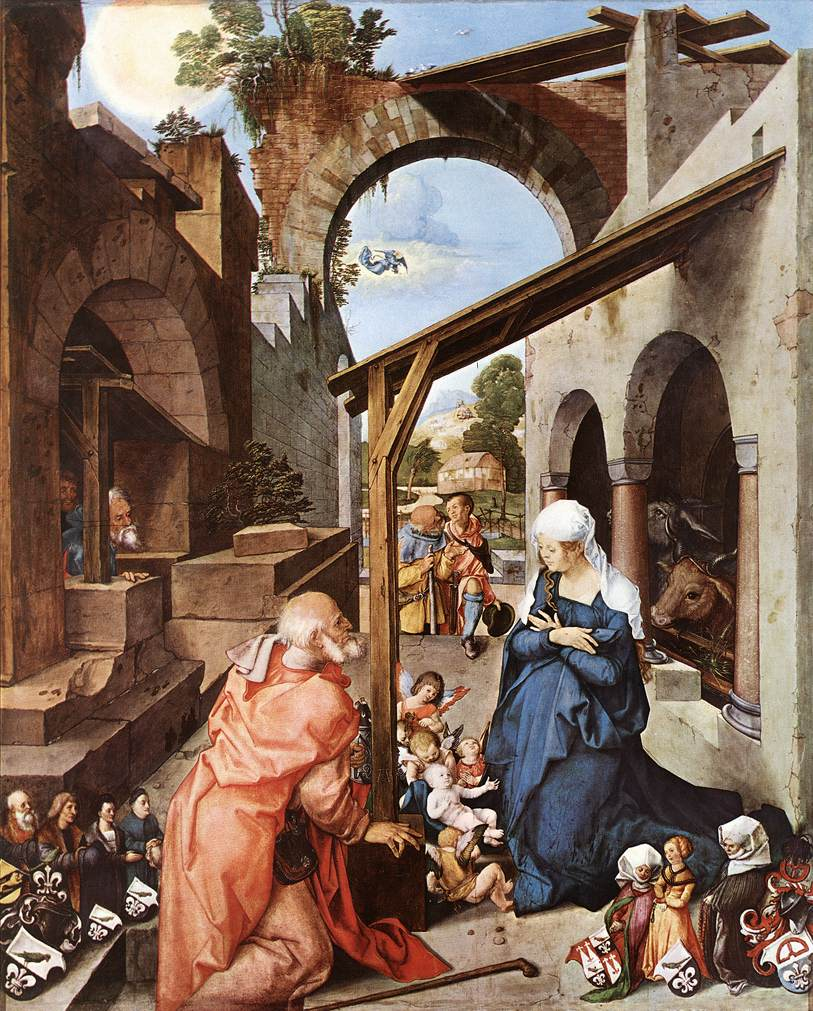
Nativity by Albrecht Dürer about 20 years later

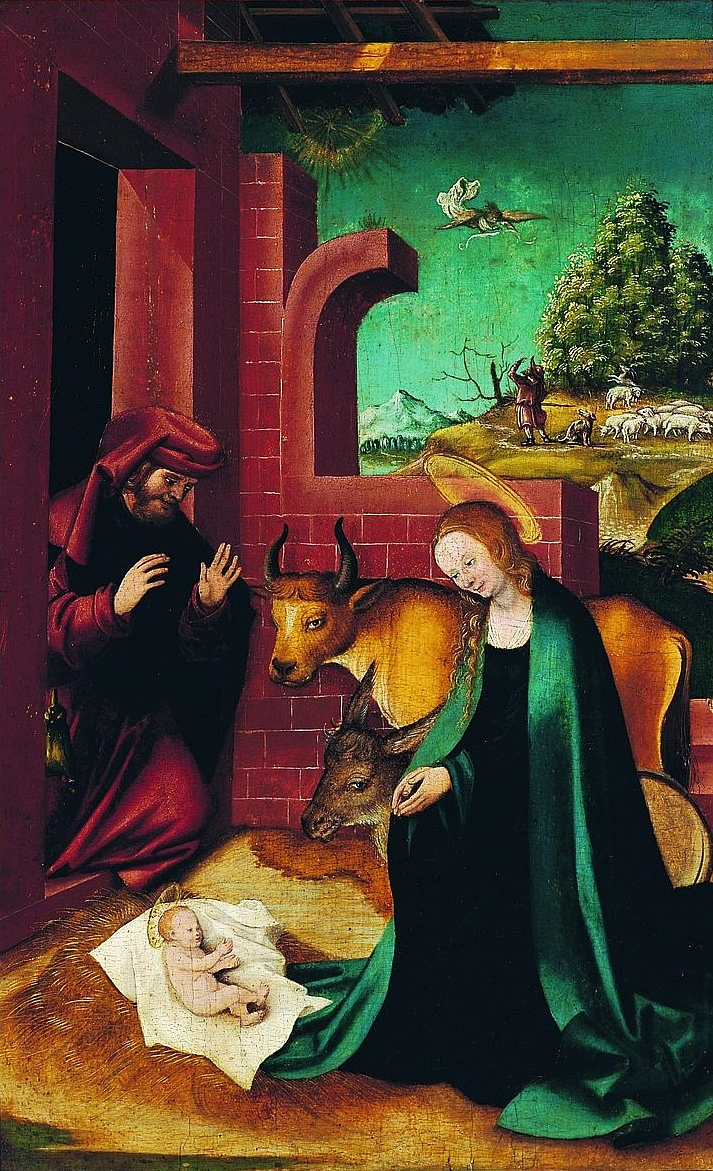
Nativity by Hans Burgkmair the Elder about 40 years later

The painting was purchased for the museum in 1902 by the museum friends' society called Kaiser-Friedrich-Museums-Verein. Its provenance before that is unknown.
