= Skederid Church =

Building in Norrtälje Municipality, Stockholm County, Sweden

Coordinates: 59°44′29″N 18°40′30″E

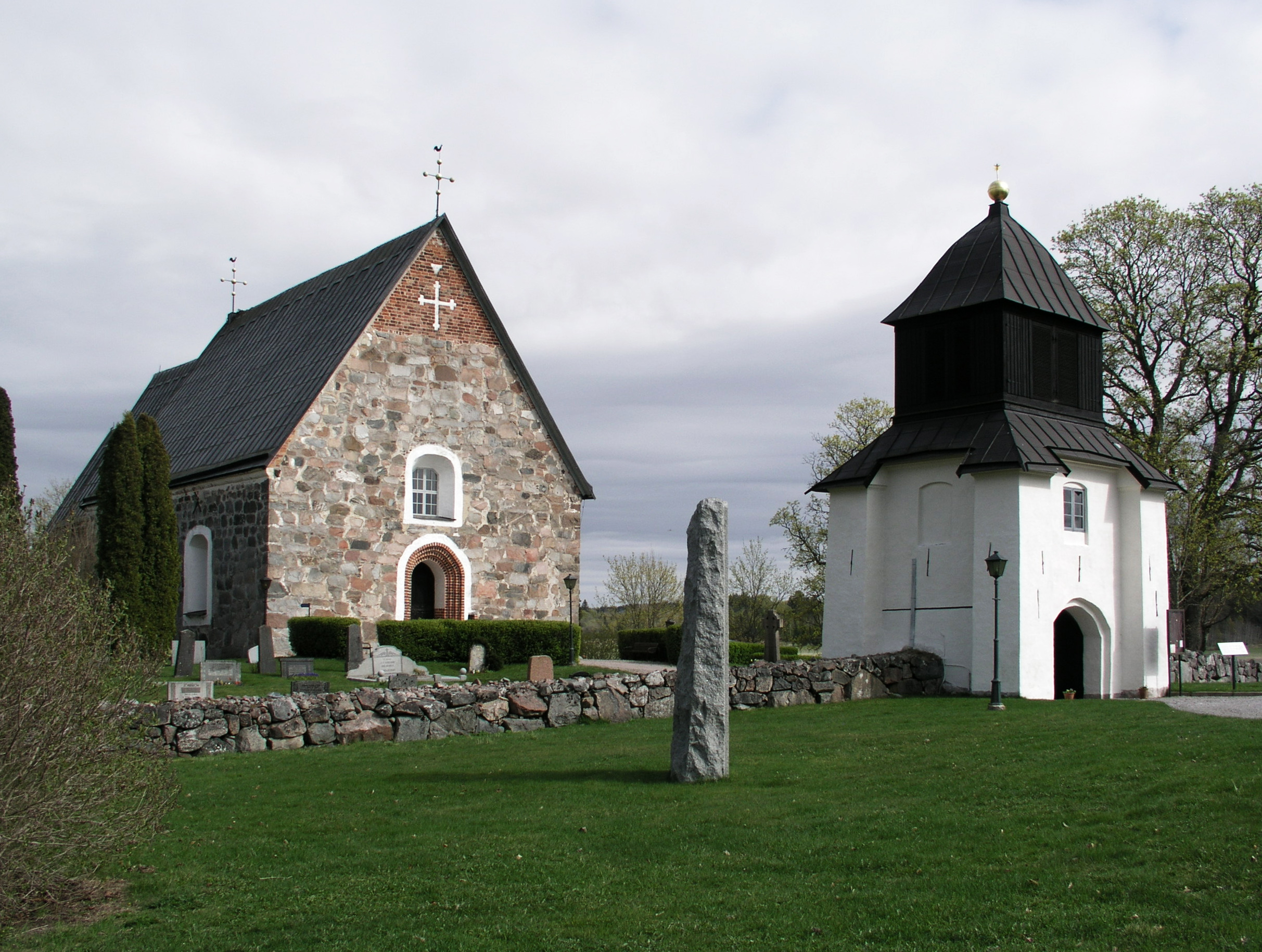
Skederid Church, external view

Skederid Church (Swedish: Skederids kyrka) is a medieval church that now belongs to the Lutheran Archdiocese of Uppsala. It lies just outside Norrtälje in Stockholm County, Sweden. It was built by Birger Persson, father of Saint Bridget of Sweden, and it is probably the church where she was baptised.

== History ==
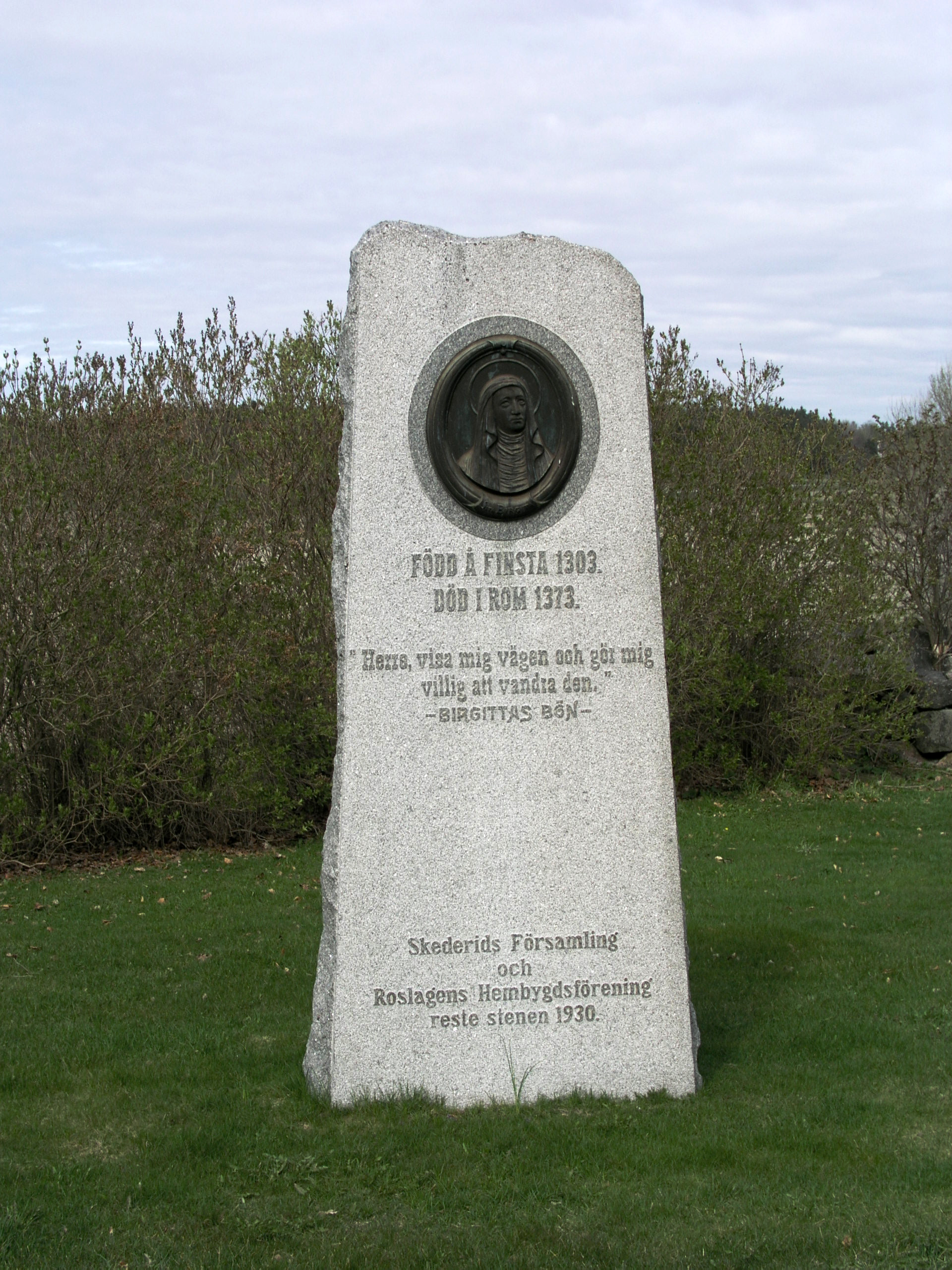
Memorial to Saint Bridget, erected outside the church in 1930

The oldest parts of Skederid Church date from the end of the 13th century, and was built by lawspeaker Birger Persson, a man closely connected to King Birger of Sweden and the father of Saint Bridget of Sweden. The area surrounding the church is rich in cultural heritage, having been the site of continuous population since at least the Bronze Age. A runestone is immured in the church. The church was originally built as a private church belonging to Birger Persson's farmstead. The original church was very small, the size of the choir of the presently visible building, but still consciously built, displaying influences from French church building traditions. The church was ravaged by fire some time during the 14th century, and the original wooden ceiling destroyed.

The young Saint Bridget had some of her earliest religious visions here. After she was proclaimed a saint in 1391, the church became a pilgrimage site. In connection with this, the church was expanded and rebuilt. By the mid-15th century it acquired the size and form it still largely has.

In 1748, the former choir was turned into a vestry, and in 1880 the old vestry was demolished. The medieval gate entrance to the cemetery was transformed into a bell tower in 1775. A memorial stone dedicated to Saint Bridget was erected outside the church in 1930.

== Architecture ==
The church is built of granite blocks, with some details in brick. The oldest parts of the church are the choir and vestry. A substantial enlargement of the church was carried out in the 15th century, when the present-day nave and interior vault were constructed. The church was originally decorated with frescos but only fragments remain of these.

The church has housed a number of medieval furnishings, most now in the Swedish History Museum, and possibly also relics (now lost) of Saint Bridget. A wooden sculpture depicting the same saint is still displayed in the church, while a triumphal cross, a processional cross and another wooden saint, all medieval, now are on displayed in the aforementioned museum. A number of carved wooden epitaphs belonging to various aristocratic families adorn the walls of the church.

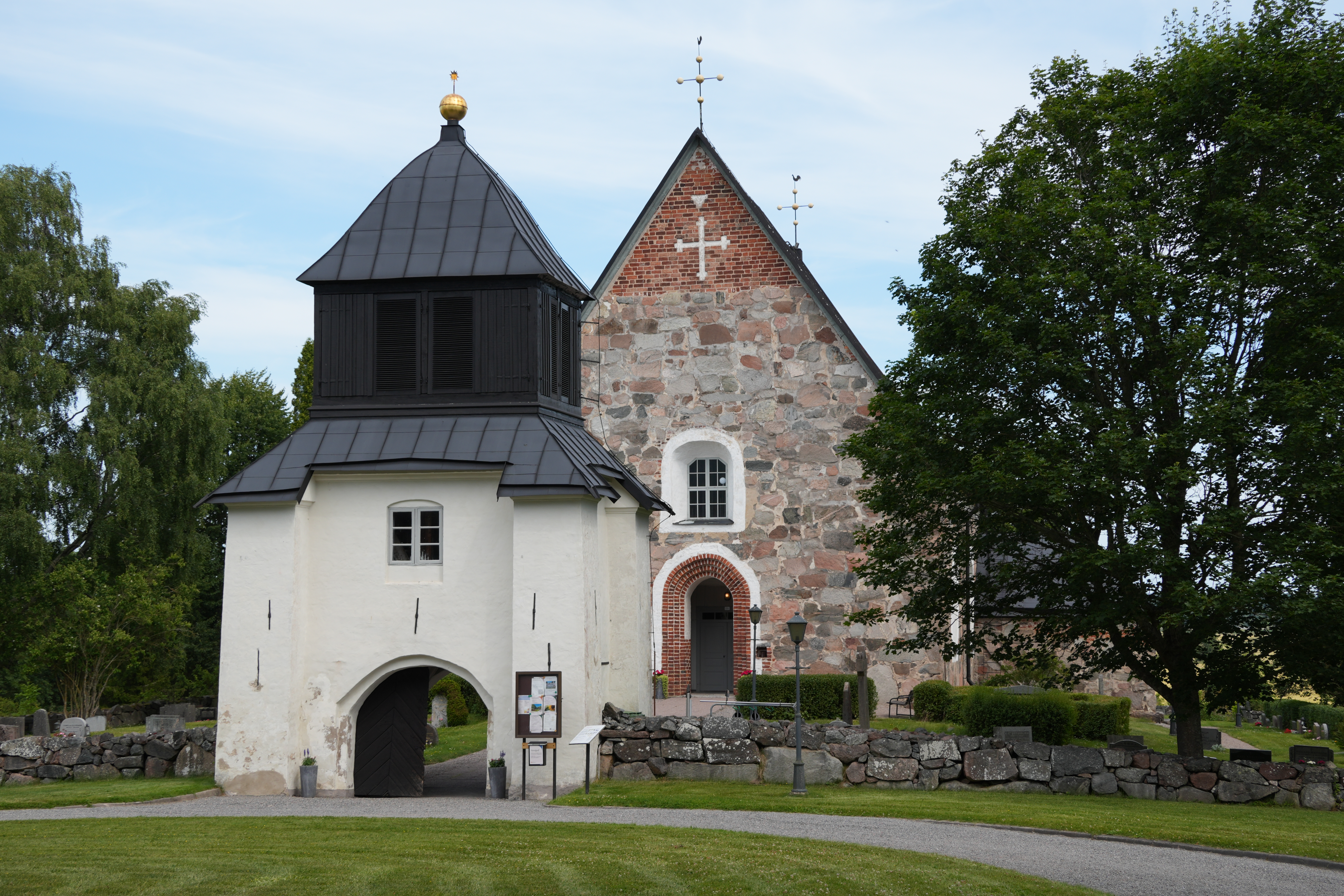
The lychgate of Skederid Evangelical-Lutheran Church

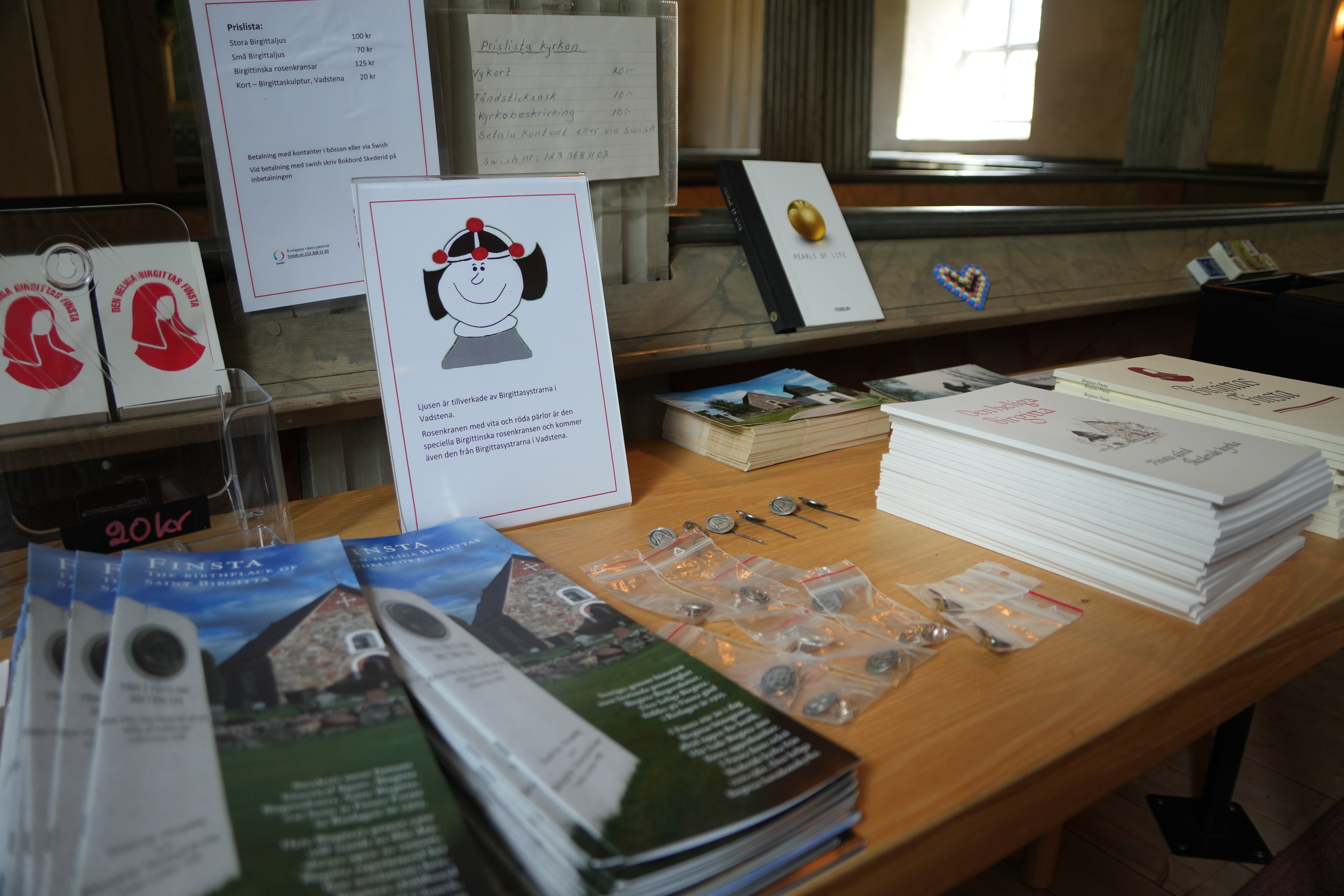
A table at Skederid Evangelical-Lutheran Church with literature, as well as brooch and lapel pins of Saint Bridget

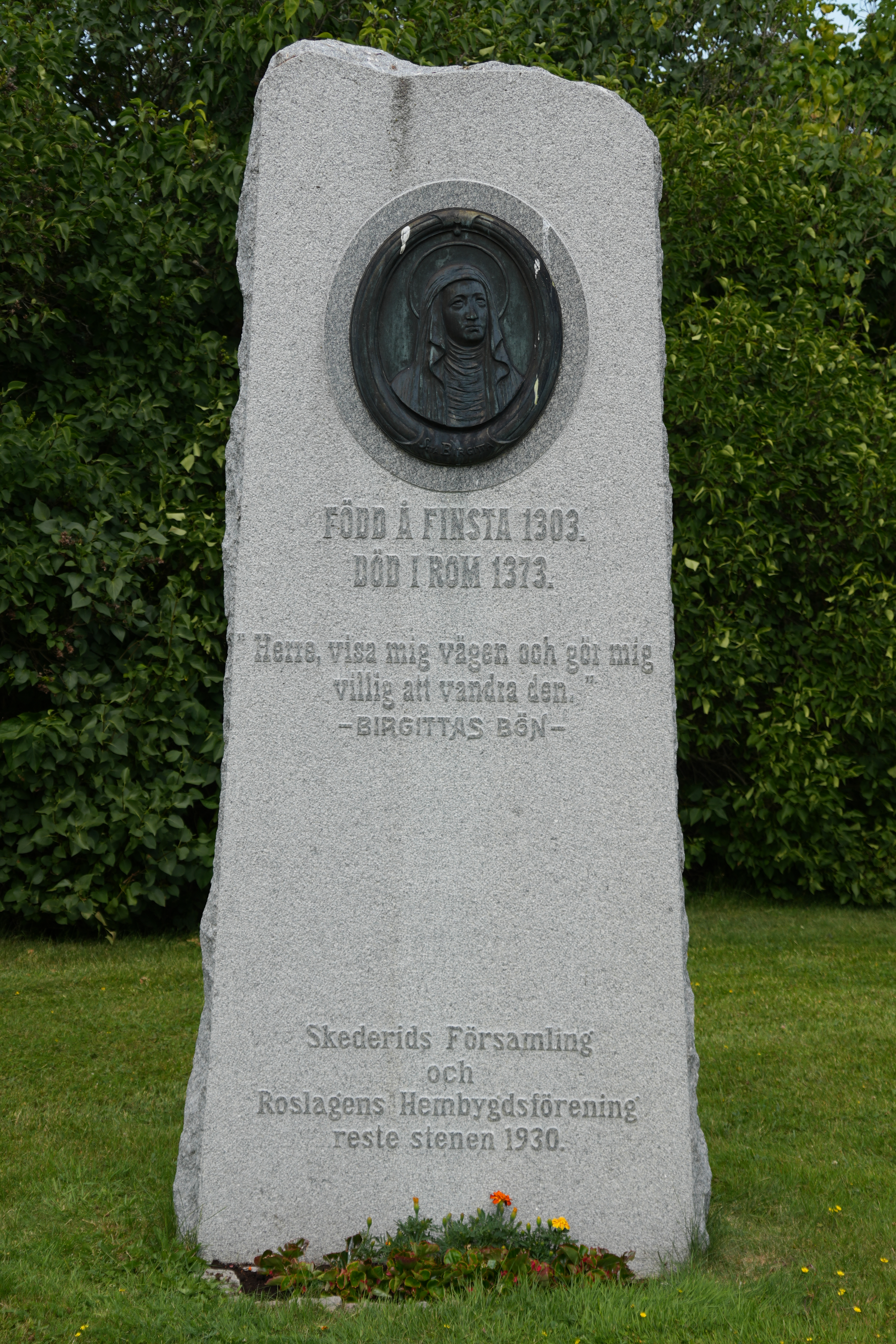
A memorial plaque to St Bridget at Skederid Evangelical-Lutheran Church

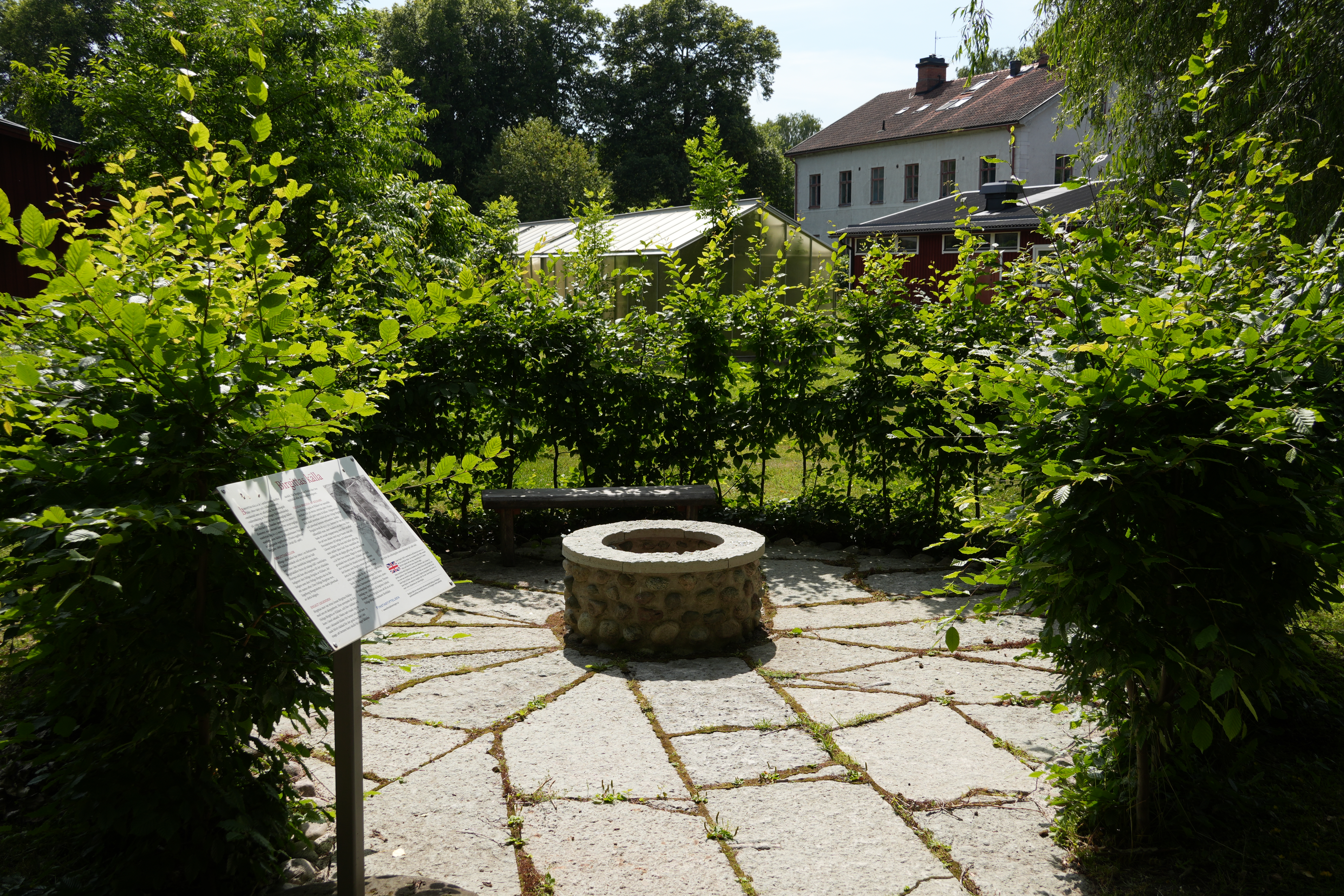
Saint Bridget's Holy Well near Skederid Church (Evangelical-Lutheran)

The exterior of Skederid Evangelical-Lutheran Church
