= Ingrid of Skänninge =

Swedish saint

Blessed Ingrid Elovsdotter OP
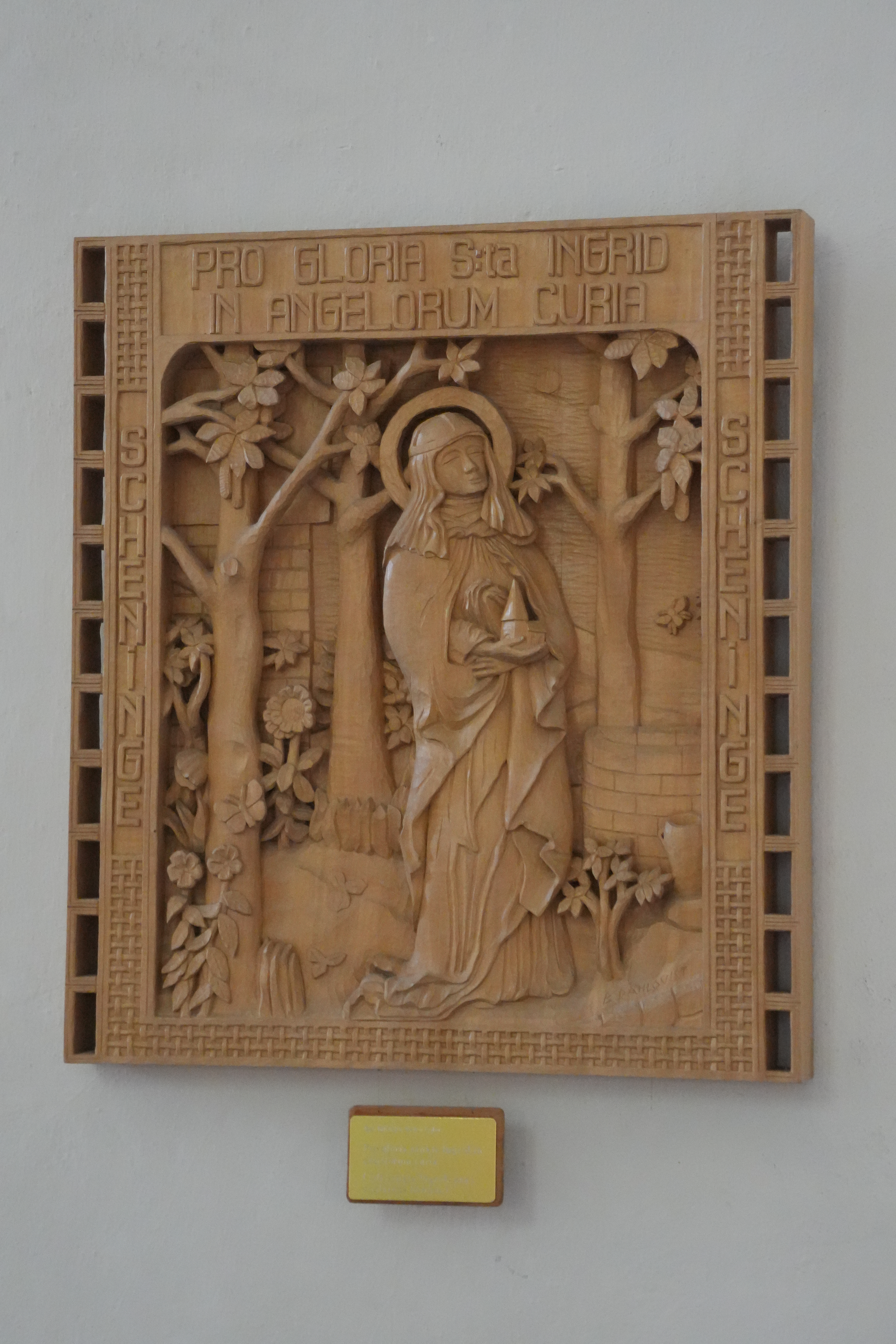
- A wooden relief panel in the Church of Our Lady in Skänninge (Evangelical-Lutheran) depicting Blessed Ingrid
- Born: c. 1220
- Died: 9 September 1282; Skänninge, Sweden
- Venerated in: Roman Catholic Church; Evangelical-Lutheran Churches
- Beatified: 16 March 1499 (cultus confirmation), Old Saint Peter's Basilica, Papal States by Pope Alexander VI
- Major shrine: Skänninge Abbey
- Feast: 2 September

Blessed Ingrid of Skänninge (died 9 September 1282) was a Swedish prioress. She founded Skänninge Abbey, a nunnery belonging to the Order of Preachers, in 1272. Her feast day is on 2 September.

== Life ==
Ingrid was the daughter of Elof, a nobleman from Östergötland. She was a member of the family Elofssönernas ätt, and belonged to the elite of the Swedish nobility. She had at least two brothers, Anders and Johan, the latter of whom was a knight of the Teutonic Order. Her niece, Kristina Johansdotter (d. 1293), was the first spouse of Birger Persson, who became the father of Bridget of Sweden in his second marriage. It is believed that Ingrid was an inspiration of Bridget.

Ingrid married a nobleman referred to as Sir Sigge, who likely died in 1271. After being widowed, Ingrid and her sister Kristina became a part of a circle of pious females around the Dominican friar Petrus de Dacia in Skänninge. In one of his letters, Petrus de Dacia has left a description of the ascetic life style and mystic revelations of one of his "spiritual daughters" in this circle of women, which likely refers to Ingrid.

In 1272, this circle of women formed a convent under the leadership of Ingrid by adopting the habit of the Dominicans and practising its rules. Ingrid made pilgrimages to Santiago de Compostela, Jerusalem and Rome. After the death of her sister, Ingrid applied for formal recognition of her convent. This was granted in 1281, a year before her death.

== Veneration ==
After her death in 1282, Ingrid's remains became objects of veneration and pilgrimages to the convent. It is possible that her fellow nuns regarded her as a saint already at the time of her death. At the Council of Constance, an application was made for her beatification. In 1499, Pope Alexander VI agreed to the translation of her relics, which took place in Skänninge Abbey in 1507.

== Legacy ==
Following the Swedish Reformation, the remains of Ingrid were removed to Vadstena Abbey. In 1645, the skull was stolen from Vadstena church by Antoine de Beaulieu, who believed it to be the skull of Bridget of Sweden. Antoine de Beaulieu gave Ingrid's skull to the French ambassador Gaspard Coignet de la Thullerie, who in turn placed it in the Church of Courson-les-Carrières in France. In 1959, it was given to the Bridgettine abbey of Mary's Refuge in Uden, where it was exhibited as a relic of Bridget of Sweden.
