= Bridget of Sweden =

Swedish nun, mystic, and saint (c.1303–1373)

Saint Bridget of Sweden OSsS
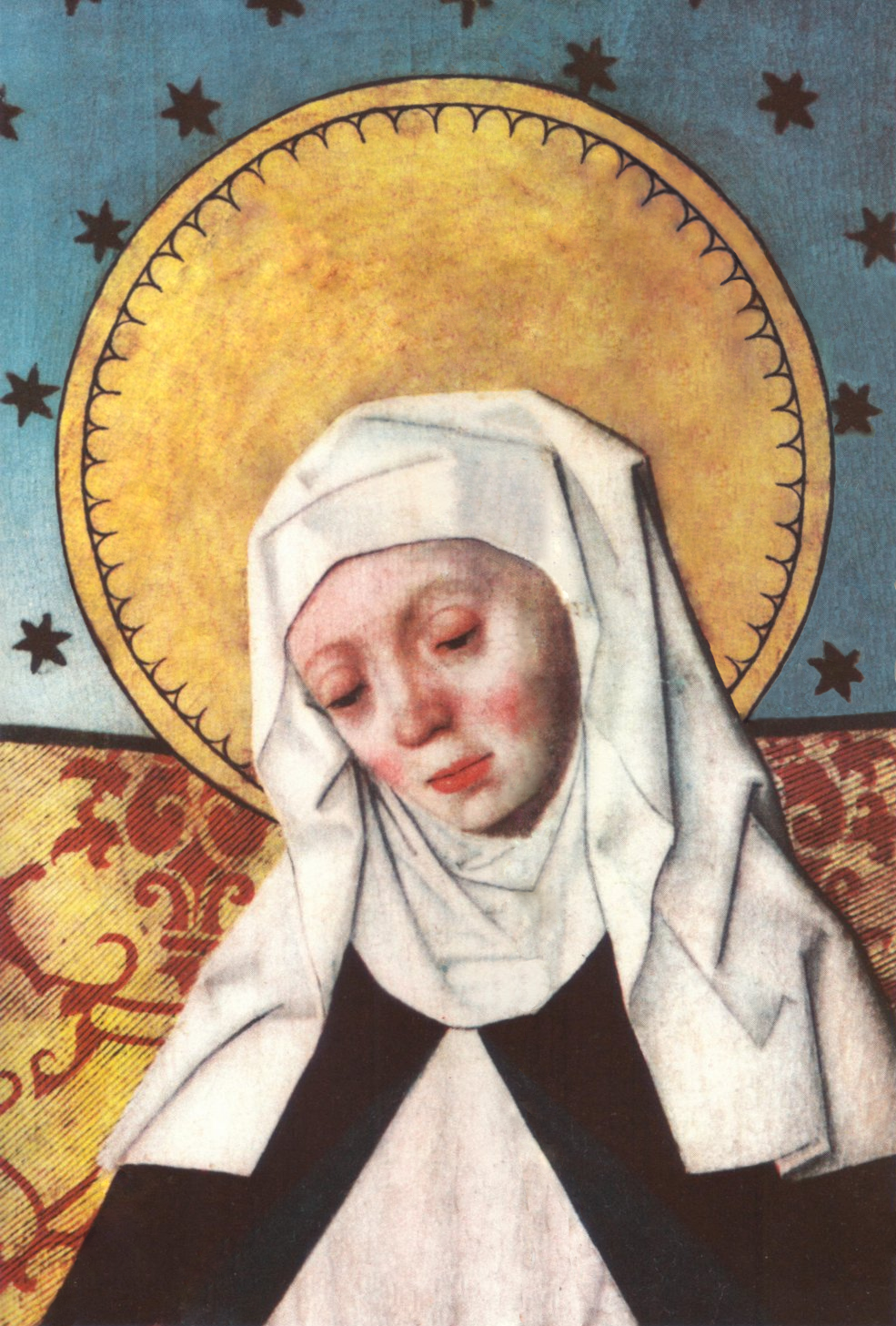
- Altarpiece in Salem church, Södermanland, Sweden (digitally restored)

Widow
- Born: c. 1304; Uppland, Sweden
- Died: 23 July 1373 (aged 68–69); Rome, Papal States
- Venerated in: Catholic Church; Anglican Communion; Lutheranism
- Canonized: 7 October 1391 by Pope Boniface IX
- Major shrine: Vadstena Abbey
- Feast: 23 July; 8 October (General Roman Calendar of 1960); 7 October (Sweden)
- Attributes: Pilgrim's hat, staff and bag; crown, writing-book, heart with a cross, book and quill
- Patronage: Europe, Sweden, widows, for a holy death

Bridget of Sweden, OSsS (c. 1304 – 23 July 1373), also known as Birgitta Birgersdotter and Birgitta of Vadstena (Swedish: heliga Birgitta), was a Swedish Catholic mystic and the founder of the Bridgettines. Outside Sweden, she was also known as the Princess of Nericia. She was the mother of Catherine of Vadstena.

Bridget is one of the six patron saints of Europe, together with Benedict of Nursia, Cyril and Methodius, Catherine of Siena and Teresa Benedicta of the Cross. Bridget of Sweden is honoured in the calendar of saints of the Catholic, Anglican, Episcopal, and Evangelical-Lutheran Churches.

== Biography ==
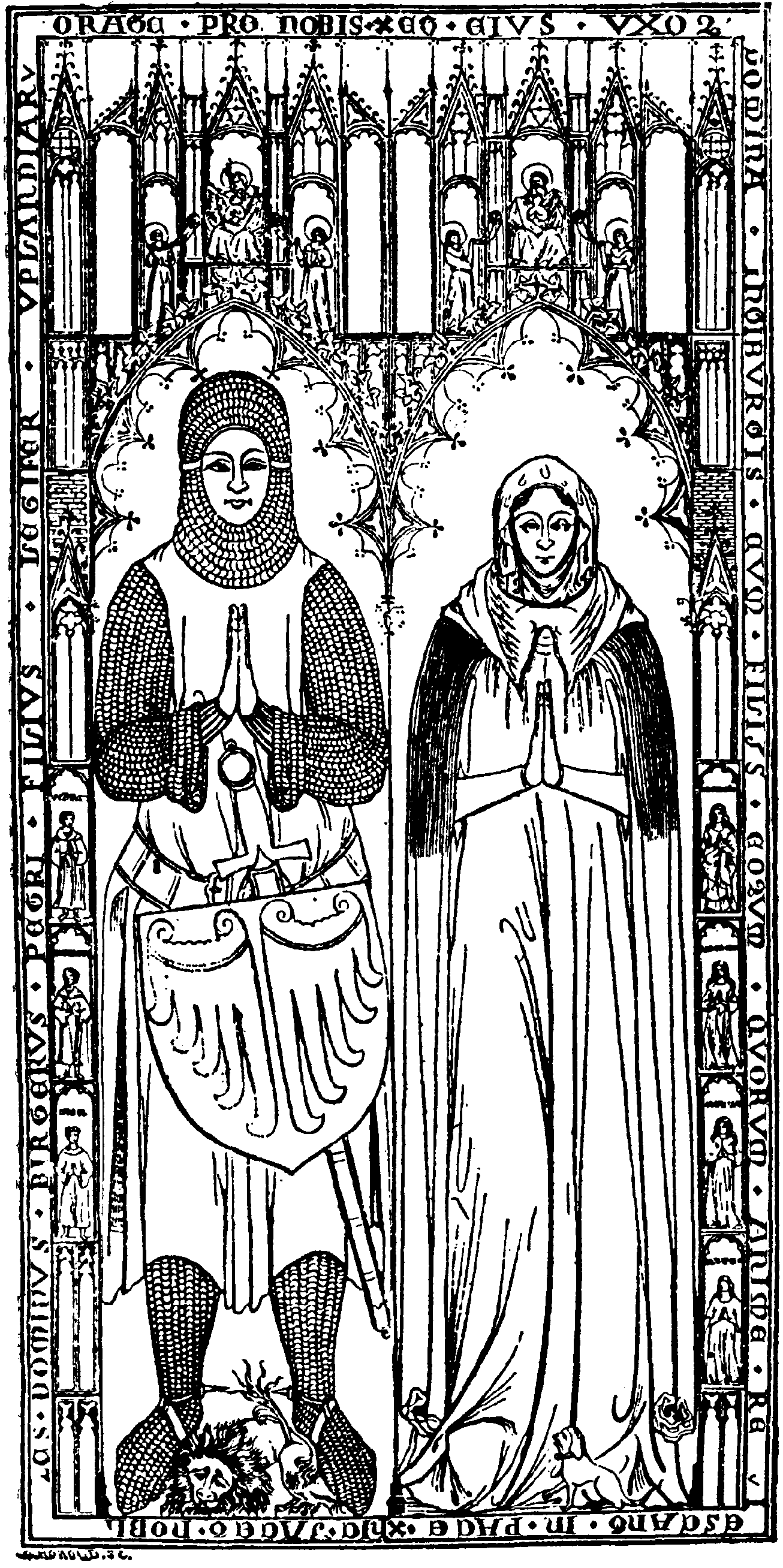
Drawing of the tomb of Bridget's parents in Uppsala Cathedral

The most celebrated saint of Sweden, Bridget was the daughter of the knight Birger Persson of the family of Finsta, governor and lawspeaker of Uppland, and one of the richest landowners of the country, and his wife Ingeborg Bengtsdotter, a member of the so-called Lawspeaker branch of the Folkunga family. Through her mother, Bridget was related to the Swedish kings of her era.

She was born in 1304. The exact date of her birth is not recorded. In 1316, at the age of 13 she married Ulf Gudmarsson of the family of Ulvåsa, a noble and lawspeaker of Östergötland, to whom she bore eight children, four daughters and four sons. Six of her children survived infancy, which was rare at that time. Her eldest daughter was Märta Ulfsdotter. Her second daughter is now honored as St. Catherine of Sweden. Her youngest daughter was Cecilia Ulvsdotter. Bridget became known for her works of charity, particularly toward Östergötland's unwed mothers and their children. When she was in her early thirties, she was summoned to be principal lady-in-waiting to the new Queen of Sweden, Blanche of Namur. In 1341, she and her husband went on pilgrimage to Santiago de Compostela.

In 1344, shortly after their return, Ulf died at the Cistercian Alvastra Abbey in Östergötland. After this loss, Bridget became a member of the Third Order of Saint Francis and devoted herself to a life of prayer and caring for the poor and the sick.

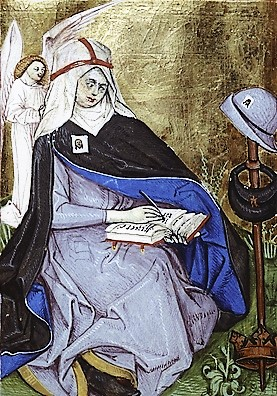
Saint Bridget in the religious habit of a Bridgettine nun, in a 1476 breviary of the form of the Liturgy of the Hours unique to Order of the Most Holy Savior

It was at this time that she developed the idea of establishing the religious community which was to become the religious order of the Most Holy Saviour, or the Bridgettines, whose principal house at Vadstena was later richly endowed by King Magnus IV of Sweden and Queen Blanche of Namur. One distinctive feature of the houses of the order was that they were double monasteries, with men and women both forming a joint community, but they lived in separate cloisters. They were required to live in poor convents and they were also required to give all of their surplus income to the poor. However, they were allowed to have as many books as they pleased.

In 1350, a Jubilee Year, Bridget braved a plague-stricken Europe to make a pilgrimage to Rome accompanied by her daughter, Catherine, and a small party of priests and disciples. This was partly done to obtain authorization to found the new order from the Pope and it was also partly done in pursuance of her self-imposed mission to elevate the moral tone of the age. This was during the period of the Avignon Papacy within the Roman Catholic Church, however, so she had to wait for the return of the papacy from the French city of Avignon to Rome, a move for which she agitated for many years.

It was not until 1370 that Pope Urban V, during his brief attempt to re-establish the papacy in Rome, confirmed the Rule of the order, but meanwhile Bridget had made herself universally beloved in Rome by her kindness and good works. Save for occasional pilgrimages, including one to Jerusalem in 1373, she remained in Rome until her death on 23 July 1373, urging ecclesiastical reform.

In her pilgrimages to Rome, Jerusalem and Bethlehem, she sent "back precise instructions for the construction of the monastery" now known as the Blue Church, insisting that an "abbess, signifying the Virgin Mary, should preside over both nuns and monks."

Bridget went to confession every day, and she had a constant smiling, glowing face. Although she never returned to Sweden, her years in Rome were far from happy, she was hounded by debts and opposition to her work against Church abuses. She was originally buried at San Lorenzo in Panisperna before her remains were returned to Sweden.

=== Sainthood ===
After Queen Margaret of Scandinavia had worked on both Pope Urban VI and his successor for it, Bridget was canonized in the year 1391 by Pope Boniface IX, which was confirmed by the Council of Constance in 1415. Because of new discussions about her works, the Council of Basel confirmed the orthodoxy of her revelations in 1436.

== Visions ==
The Vision of St Bridget: The Risen Christ, displaying his wound from Longinus, inspires the writing of Saint Bridget. Detail of initial letter miniature, dated 1530, probably made at Syon Abbey, England, a Bridgettine House.

At the age of ten, Bridget had a vision of Jesus hanging upon the cross. When she asked who had treated him like this, he answered:

They who despise me, and spurn my love for them.

The Passion of Christ became the center of her spiritual life from that moment on. The revelations which she had received since her childhood now became more frequent, and the records of these Revelationes coelestes ("Celestial revelations") which were translated into Latin by Matthias, canon of Linköping, and her confessor, Peter Olafsson, prior of Alvastra, acquired a great vogue during the Middle Ages. These revelations made Bridget something of a celebrity to some and a controversial figure to others.

=== Vision of the birth of Christ with kneeling Virgin ===
Her visions of the Nativity of Jesus would influence later depictions of the Nativity of Jesus in art. Shortly before her death, she described a vision which included the infant Jesus lying on (not in) clean swaddling clothes on the ground, and emitting light himself, and she described the Virgin as blonde-haired and kneeling in prayer exactly as she was moments before the spontaneous birth, with her womb shrunken and her virginity intact.

Many depictions followed this scene, they included the popular ox and donkey and they reduced other light sources in the scene in order to emphasize the "child of light" effect, and the Nativity was treated with chiaroscuro through the Baroque. Other details which are frequently seen, such as Joseph carrying a single candle that he "attached to the wall," and the presence of God the Father above, also originated in Bridget's vision.

The pose of the Virgin kneeling to pray to her child, to be joined by Saint Joseph, technically known as the "Adoration of the Child", became one of the most common depictions in the fifteenth and sixteenth centuries, largely replacing the reclining Virgin in the West. A few earlier depictions of the Virgin which show her with an ox and a donkey (scenes which are not described in the gospels) were produced as early as 1300, before Bridget was born, have a Franciscan origin, by which she may have been influenced, because she was a member of the Franciscan order.

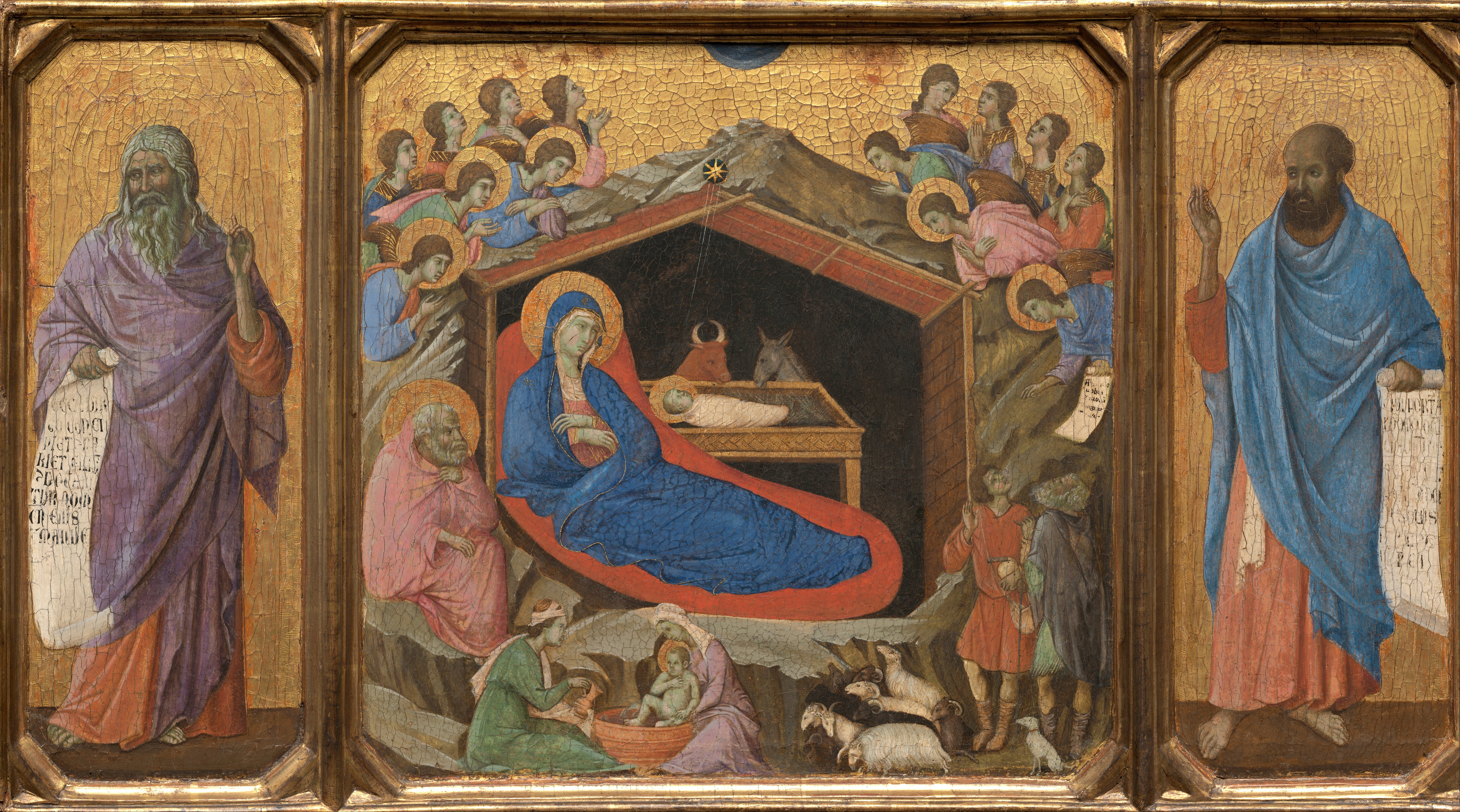
Virgin with ox and donkey, with midwife Salomé off to the side, c. 1311, by Duccio di Buoninsegna

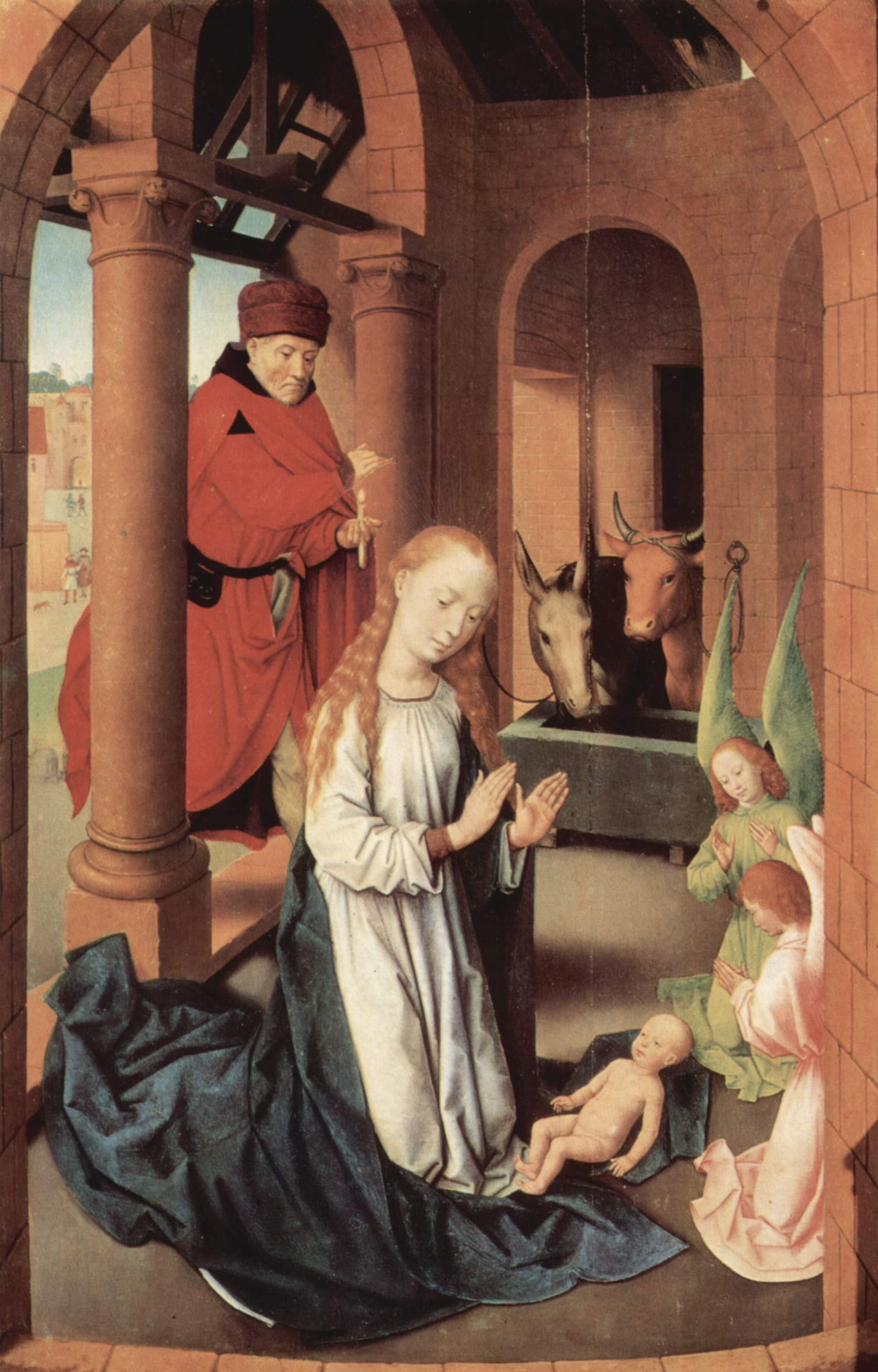
Virgin with Saint Joseph holding a candle as he enters the space with angels, ox, and donkey, circa 1470, by Hans Memling

Her visions of Purgatory were also well-known.

=== Prophecy ===
In addition, "she even predicted an eventual Vatican State, foretelling almost the exact boundaries delineated by Mussolini for Vatican City in 1921."

Pope Benedict XVI spoke of Bridget in a general audience on 27 October 2010, saying that the value of Saint Bridget's Revelations, sometimes the object of doubt, was specified by Pope John Paul II in the letter Spes Aedificandi: "Yet there is no doubt that the Church," wrote my beloved predecessor, "which recognized Bridget's holiness without ever pronouncing on her individual revelations, has accepted the overall authenticity of her interior experience."

== Fifteen 'Our Father and Hail Mary prayers' ==
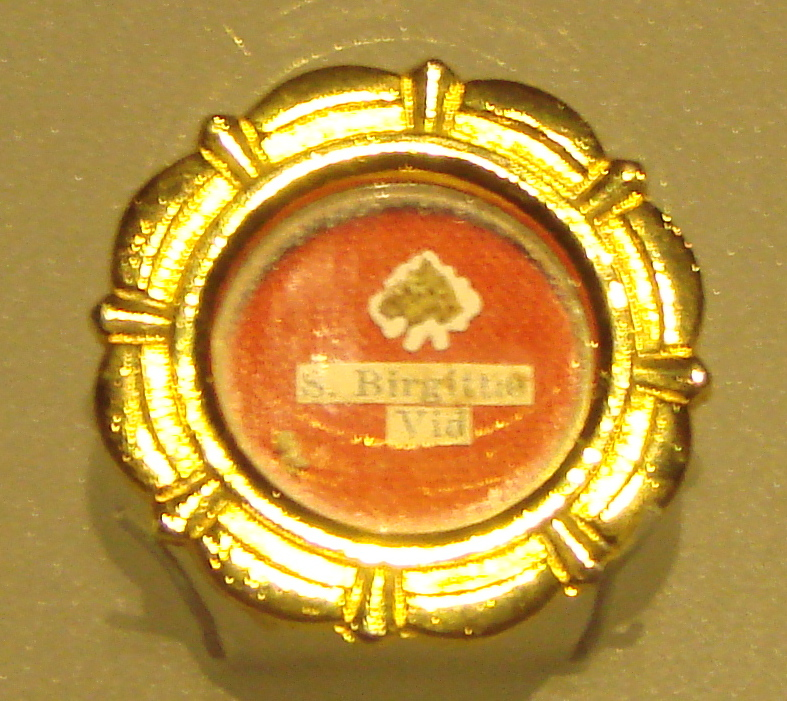
Saint Bridget's reliquary, holding a piece of her bone

Saint Bridget prayed for a long time to know how many blows Jesus Christ suffered during the Passion. Jesus was said to have responded to these prayers by appearing to her and stating that "I received 5480 blows upon My Body. If you wish to honor them in some way, recite fifteen Our Fathers and fifteen Hail Marys with the following Prayers, which I Myself shall teach you, for an entire year. When the year is finished, you will have honored each of My Wounds."

The prayers became known as the "Fifteen O's" because in the original Latin, each prayer began with the words O Jesu, O Rex, or O Domine Jesu Christe. Some have questioned whether Saint Bridget is in fact their author; Eamon Duffy reports that the prayers probably originated in England, in the devotional circles that surrounded Richard Rolle or the English Brigittines.

Whatever their origin, the prayers were widely circulated in the late Middle Ages, and they became regular features in Books of Hours and other devotional literature. They were translated into various languages; an early English language version of them was printed in a primer by William Caxton. The prayers themselves reflect the late medieval tradition of meditation on the passion of Christ, and are structured around the seven last words of Christ. They borrow from patristic and Scriptural sources as well as the tradition of devotion to the wounds of Christ.

During the Middle Ages, the prayers were circulated with various promises of indulgence and other assurances of 21 supernatural graces supposed to attend the daily recitation of the 15 orations at least for a year. These indulgences were repeated in the manuscript tradition of the Books of Hours, and may constitute one major source of the prayers' popularity in the late Middle Ages. They promise, among other things, the release from Purgatory of fifteen of the devotee's family members, and that they would keep fifteen living family members in a state of grace.

The extravagance of the promises which were made in these rubrics—one widely circulated version promised that the devotee would receive "his heart's desire, if it be for the salvation of his soul"—attracted critics early and late. In 1538, William Marshall enjoined his readers to "henseforth ... forget suche prayers as seynt Brigittes & other lyke, whyche greate promyses and perdons haue falsly auaunced."

Martin Luther strongly rejected the Roman Catholic belief in the 21 promises and nicknamed St Bridget Die tolle Brigit (The foolish Bridget). In the following decades, the Reformed Churches sought to eradicate the devotion to similar angelic and spiritual entities claiming they were a 'popish' and 'pagan' legacy. Calvinism was characterized by a lower degree of Marian devotion than that pertaining to the Roman Catholic Church, particularly with reference to the Marian title of Queen of Angels. Evangelical-Lutheranism continued to honour St Bridget of Sweden, commemorating her in the Evangelical-Lutheran calendar of saints, though rejecting the Roman Catholic concept of invocation of the saints.

The Vatican and the Lutheran Church jointly conceived a modern devotion to St Bridget which had remained a relevant factor of disagreement between the two churches till then. In 1954, the Supreme Sacred Congregation of the Holy Office ruled that the alleged promises (though not the prayers themselves) are unreliable, and it directed local ordinaries not to permit the circulation of pamphlets which contain the promises.

The ecumenical process of reconciliation culminated on 8 October 1991 during the sexcentennial of St Bridget's canonization, when Pope John Paul II and two Lutheran bishops met and prayed in front of the burial place of St Peter Apostle, in Rome. It was the first time in which a joint prayer was said by members of the two communities.

== Veneration ==
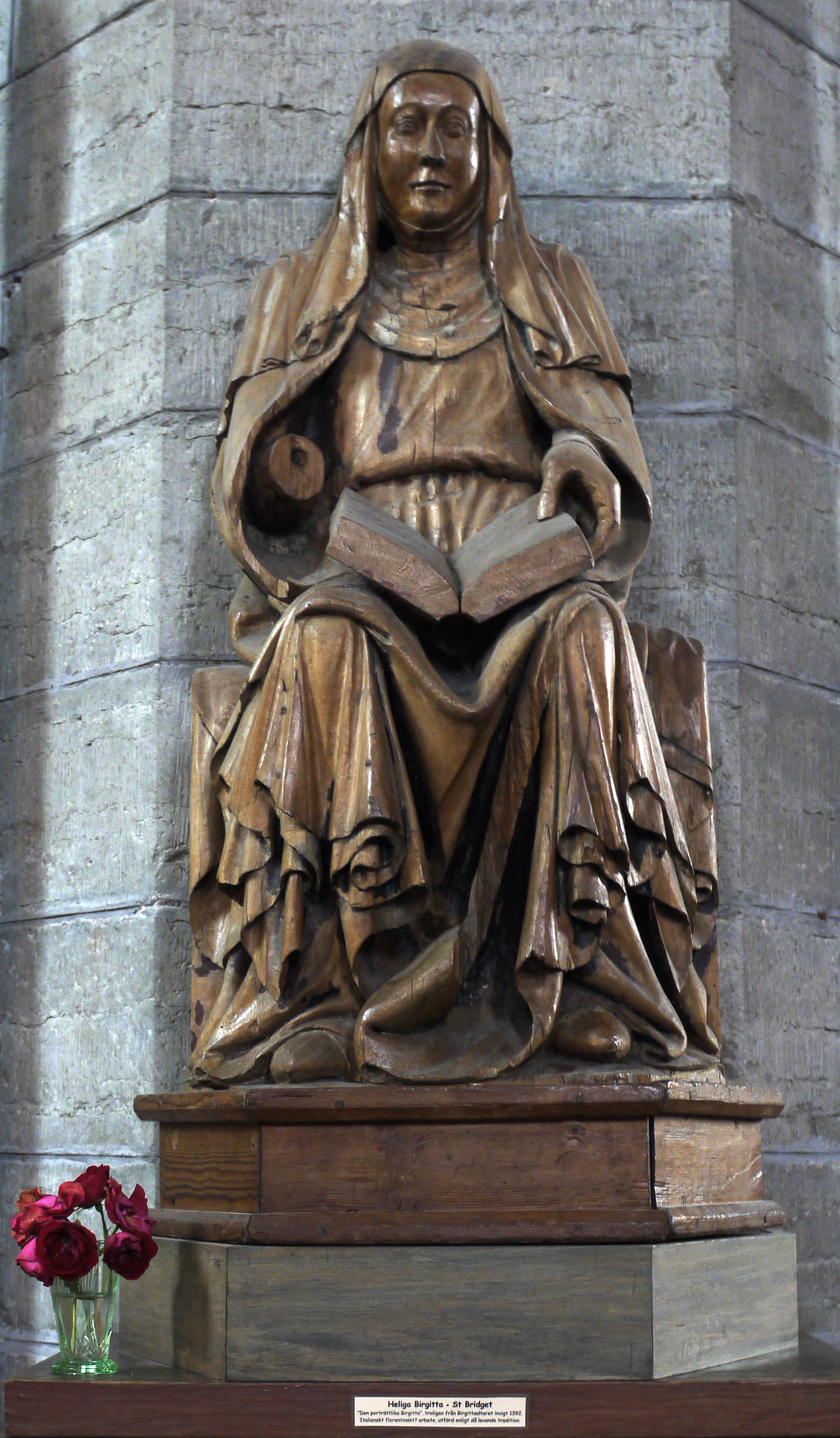
Statue of Bridget of Sweden in Vadstena Abbey. Work by sculptor Johannes Junge in 1425.

The Brigitta Chapel was erected in 1651 in Vienna, and in 1900 the new district Brigittenau was founded. In Sweden, adjacent to Skederid Church, built by Bridget's father on the family's land, a memorial stone was erected in 1930.

On 1 October 1999, Pope John Paul II named Saint Bridget a patron saint of Europe. Her feast day is celebrated on 23 July, the day of her death. Her feast was not in the Tridentine calendar, but was inserted in the General Roman Calendar in 1623 for celebration on 7 October, the day of her 1391 canonization by Pope Boniface IX. Five years later, her feast day was moved to 8 October (but the Church in Sweden celebrates it on the 7th), a date which was not changed until the revision of the General Roman Calendar in 1969, when it was set on 8 October. Some continue to use the earlier General Roman Calendar of 1954, the General Roman Calendar of Pope Pius XII, or the General Roman Calendar of 1960.

The Third Order of Saint Francis includes her feast day on its Calendar of saints on 23 July or 8, depending on the local province, honoring her as a member of the order.

The Bjärka-Säby Monastery contains a portrait of Bridget of Sweden which is venerated by Christians who are members of several denominations. An hour away from this monastery, the Vadstena Abbey (Evangelical-Lutheran), also known as the Blue Church, contains relics of the saint, and her body is venerated by Lutheran and Catholic believers.

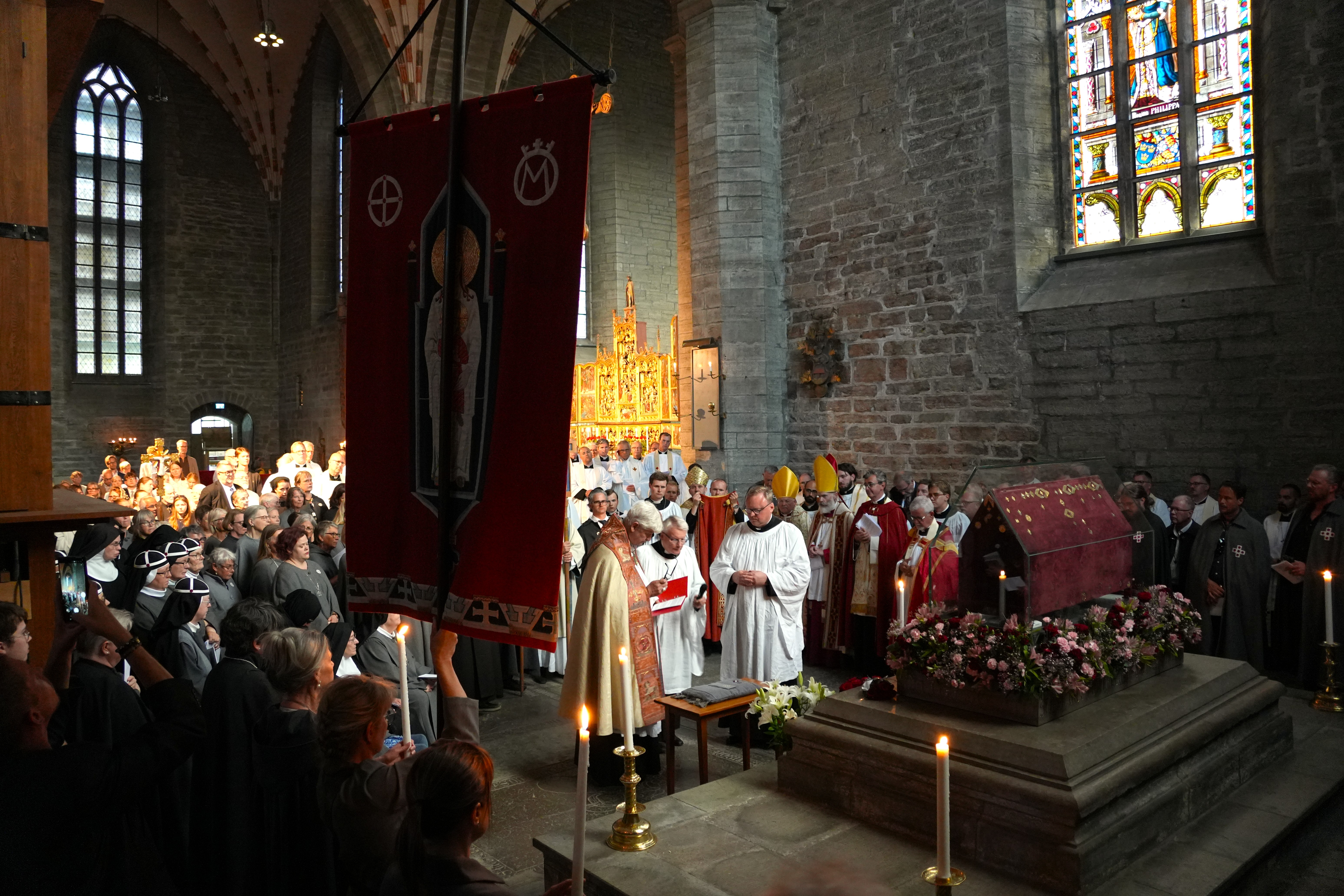
An Evangelical-Lutheran Mass of the Societas Sanctae Birgittae at the relics of St Bridget in Vadstena Abbey Church

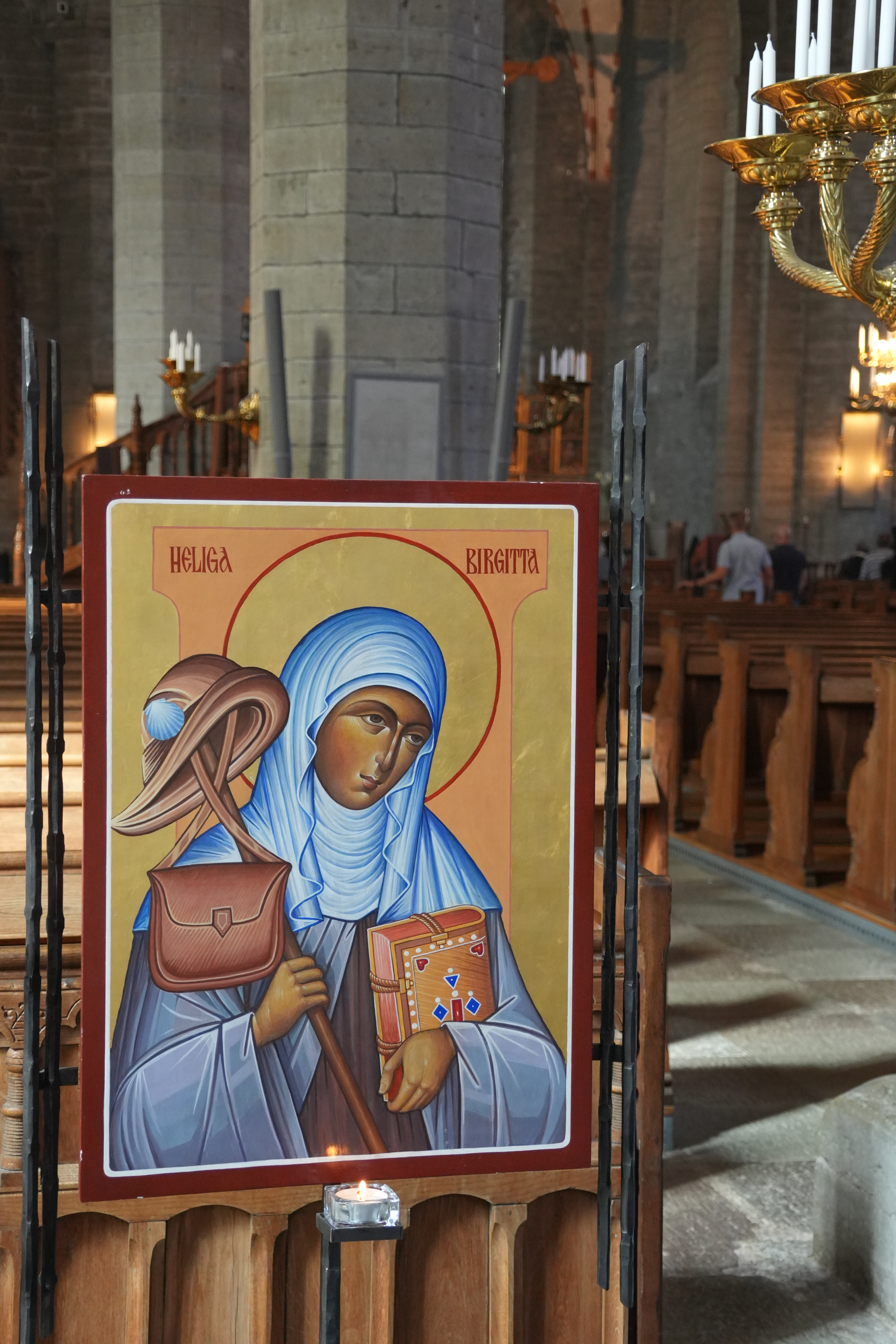
Icon of St Bridget in Vadstena Abbey Church, depicting Saint Bridget as a pilgrim

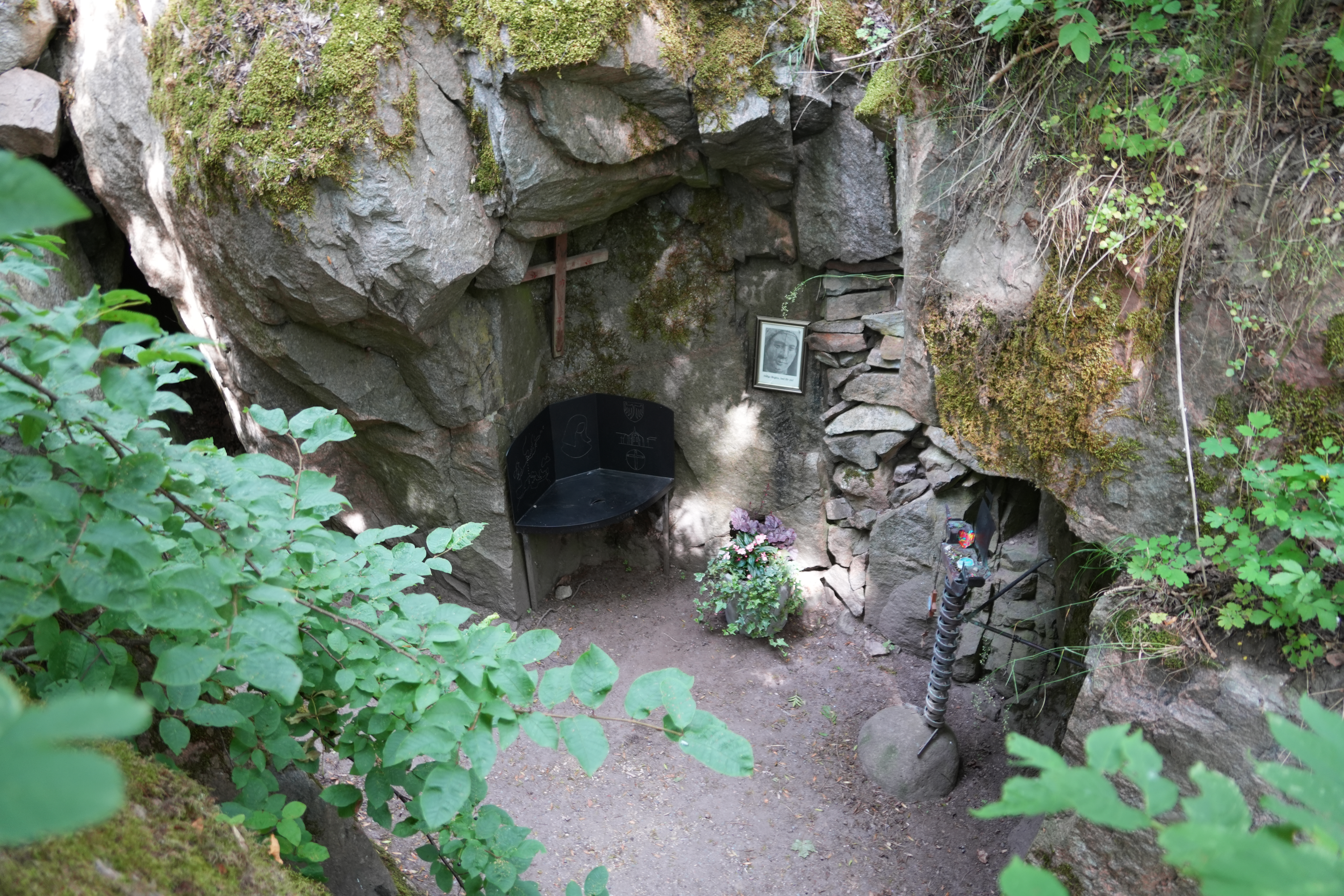
An outdoor Evangelical-Lutheran shrine to St Bridget in Finsta, Sweden called 'Saint Bridget's Prayer Cave'

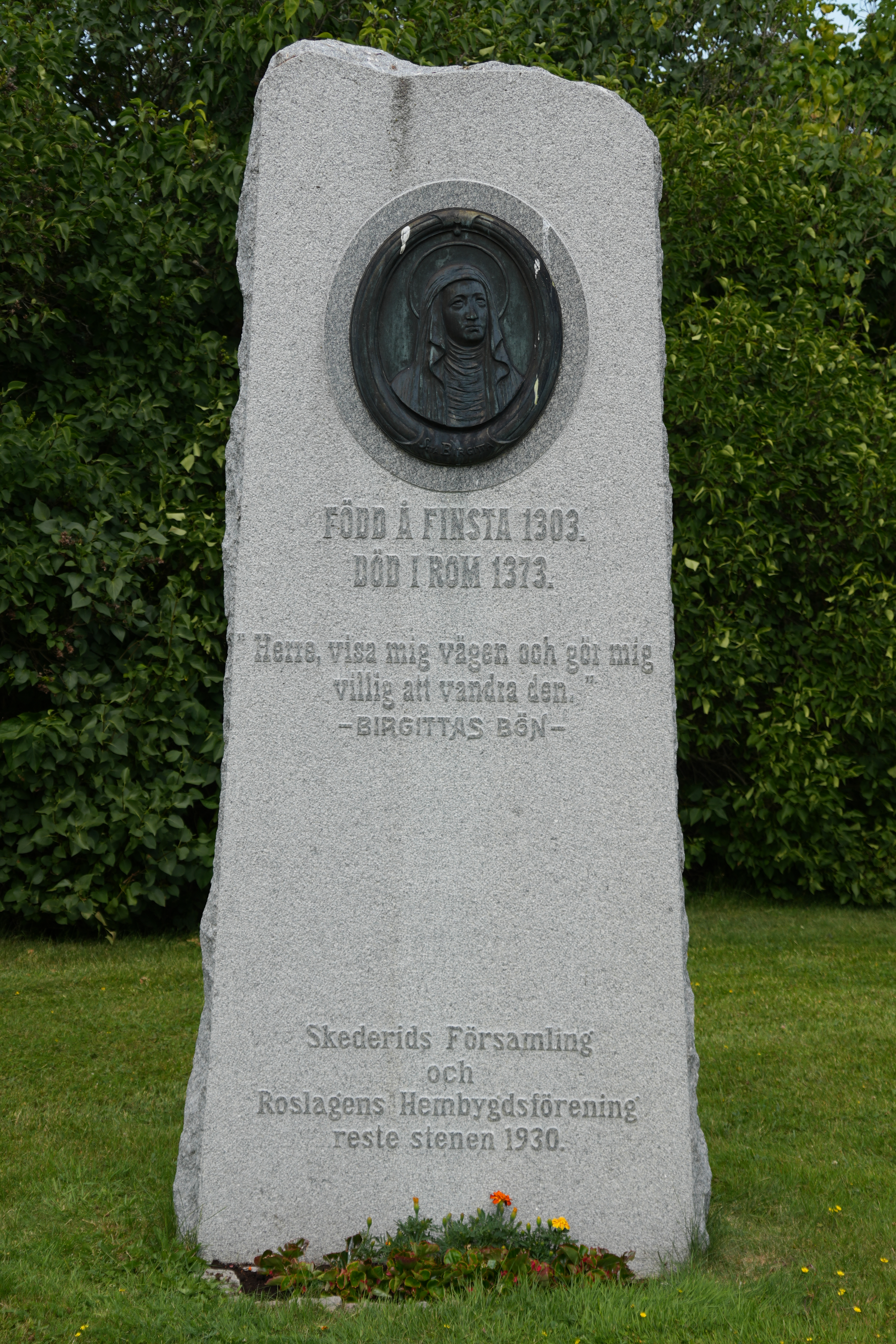
A memorial plaque to St Bridget at Skederid Church (Evangelical-Lutheran) in Norrtälje, Sweden

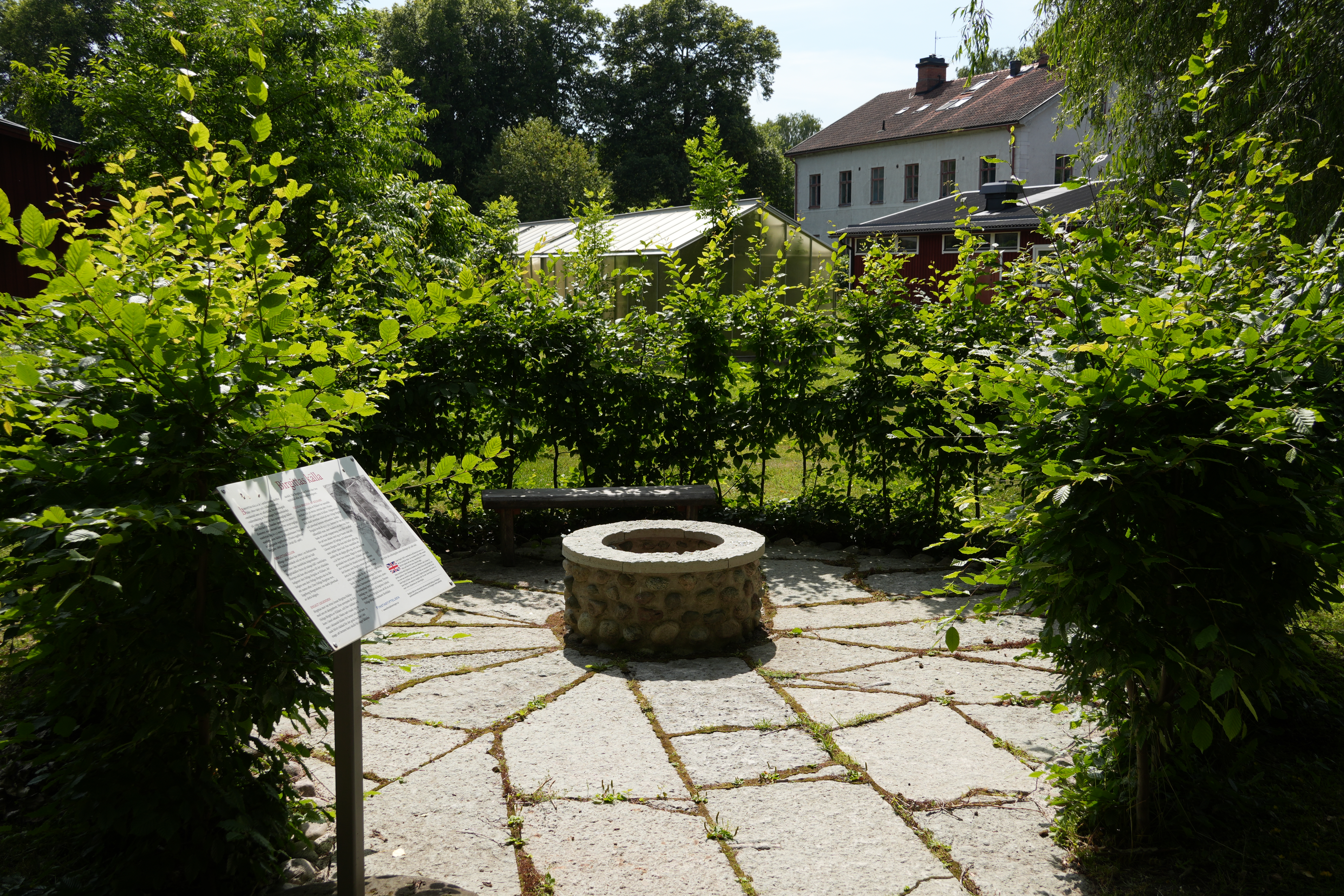
Saint Bridget's Holy Well near Skederid Church (Evangelical-Lutheran) in Finsta, Sweden

An Evangelical-Lutheran icon with St Bridget of Sweden (at Vadstena Abbey Church)

Bridget is remembered by the Church of England, which holds a commemoration on 23 July and on the Episcopal Church liturgical calendar on 7 October.

== Evaluations and interpretations ==
Although he was initially interested in Bridget's Revelations, Martin Luther would later conclude that her visions were mere ravings. Some 19th-century writers presented her as a forerunner of the Protestant Reformation due to her criticism of popes, bishops and other members of the clergy who did not live in accordance with the teachings of their religion. However, she never criticized that teaching or the church as such.

Of her as depicted in his play Folkungasagan August Strindberg explained Bridget as "a power-hungry, vainglorious woman who intentionally vied for sainthood", adding "of this unpleasant woman and according to the historical documents I made the uncontrollable ninny now in my drama, although in her honor I let her awaken to clarity about her silliness and her arrogance."

Centuries of Selfies (2020) describes how Bridget damaged King Magnus and Queen Blanche by accusing them of "erotic deviations, extravagance and murderous plots", a description particularly noted by Dala-Demokraten as likely to upset Swedish nuns. With the eventual translation of her Latin works into Swedish, increased understanding and appreciation of her evolved in some Swedish circles, but more historians have shown how Bridget used personally and politically motivated mud-slinging against people she did not like.

== See also ==
- Pirita convent
- Societas Sanctae Birgittae
- Saint Bridget of Sweden, patron saint archive

== Editions ==
Saint Birgitta's Revelaciones, that is, her Revelations written in Latin, appeared in critical editions during the years 1956 to 2002 under the aegis of the Royal Academy of Letters, History and Antiquities, Stockholm.

- Sancta Birgitta. Revelaciones Lib. I. Ed. by C.-G. Undhagen. Stockholm 1978.
- Sancta Birgitta. Revelaciones Lib. II. Ed. by C.-G. Undhagen† and B. Bergh. Stockholm 2001.
- Sancta Birgitta. Revelaciones Lib. III. Ed. by A.-M. Jönsson. Stockholm 1998.
- Sancta Birgitta. Revelaciones Lib. IV. Ed. by H. Aili. Stockholm 1992.
- Sancta Birgitta. Revelaciones Lib. V. Ed. by B. Bergh. Uppsala 1971.
- Sancta Birgitta. Revelaciones Lib. VI. Ed. by B. Bergh. Stockholm 1991.
- Sancta Birgitta. Revelaciones Lib. VII. Ed. by B. Bergh. Uppsala 1967.
- Sancta Birgitta. Revelaciones Lib. VIII. Ed. by H. Aili. Stockholm 2002.
- Sancta Birgitta. Revelaciones extravagantes Ed. by L. Hollman. Uppsala 1956.
- Sancta Birgitta. Opera minora Vol. I. Regula Salvatoris Ed. by. S. Eklund. Stockholm 1975.
- Sancta Birgitta. Opera minora Vol. II. Sermo angelicus Ed. by. S. Eklund. Uppsala 1972.
- Sancta Birgitta. Opera minora Vol. III. Quattuor oraciones Ed. by. S. Eklund. Stockholm 1991.

English translations are:

- The revelations of Saint Birgitta of Sweden, translated by Denis Searby, with introductions and notes by Bridget Morris, 4 vols. (Oxford: Oxford University Press, 2006–2015) [Volume 1 has Books I–III; Volume II has Books IV–V; Volume III has books VI–VII; Volume IV has book VIII]
- Birgitta of Sweden, Life and selected revelations, edited, with a preface by Marguerite Tjader Harris; translation and notes by Albert Ryle Kezel; introduction by Tore Nyberg, (New York: Paulist Press, 1990) [Includes translations of The life of Blessed Birgitta by Prior Peter and Master Peter, and Books 5 and 7 of Revelationes, and the Four prayers from the Revelationes.]
- Saint Bride and her book: Birgitta of Sweden's revelations, translated from middle English, introduction, by Julia Bolton Holloway, (1992)
- Arne Jönsson, St. Bridget's Revelations to the Popes : an edition of the so-called Tractatus de summis pontificibus, (Lund: Lund University Press, 1997)

== Monographs ==
- Aili, H. & Svanberg, J., Imagines Sanctae Birgittae. The Earliest Illuminated Manuscripts and Panel Paintings Related to the Revelations of St. Birgitta of Sweden. Stockholm: The Royal Academy of Letters, History and Antiquities. 2003.
- The Prophecies and Revelations of Saint Bridget (Birgitta) of Sweden and Her Life – With various Prayers. Archived from the original on 6 June 2010.
- James J Walsh (1907). St. Bridget of Sweden: a chapter of mediaeval church history. Vol. I vol. (No 2). Washington: The Writers Club of Washington. p. 64 – via archive.org.
