= Cecilia Ulvsdotter =

Swedish noblewoman (died 1399)

Cecilia Ulvsdotter (died 12 March 1399), was a Swedish noblewoman.

She was born as the youngest child of Bridget of Sweden and Ulf Gudmarsson. In the legend of Bridget, she was born with the assistance of the Virgin Mary. Because of this, her mother decided her for a holy life and placed her in the Skänninge Abbey as a novice. She was placed in the convent against her will and was freed by her brother Karl Ulvsson. She married either two or three times, first with an unknown man who died of poisoning during the wedding between Haakon VI of Norway and Margaret I of Denmark in 1363. At this occasion, Magnus IV of Sweden was saved from poisoning by Lars Sonesson (d. 1377), who was given Cecilia as a reward against the will of her family. As a widow, she was involved in a lawsuit about her dowry estate. In 1380, she married riksråd Bengt Filipsson (d. 1383). Twice widowed, she settled as a guest in Vadstena Abbey, to which she was a substantial donor, and where she died.
