= Skänninge Abbey =

Dominican nunnery in Sweden (1272–1544)

Coordinates: 58.3987°N 15.0829°E

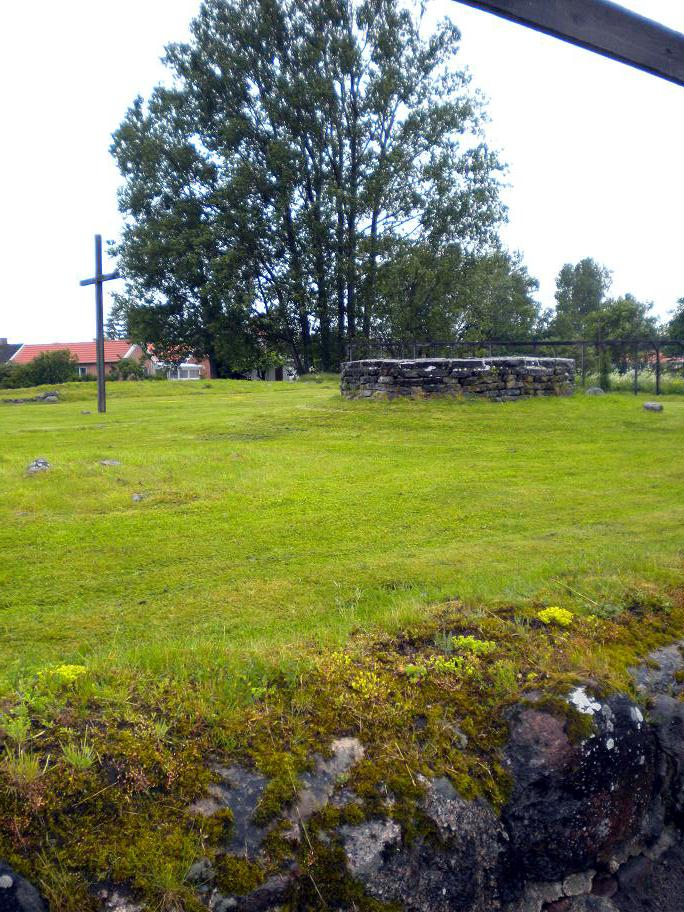
Abbey site

Skänninge Abbey, also known as St. Ingrid's Priory, was a convent for Dominican nuns in Skänninge in Sweden which existed from 1272 until 1544. It was founded by Ingrid of Skänninge, and as such, it was often referred to as St. Ingrid's Priory. Located near the church dedicated to Martin of Tours, it was originally named St. Martin's Priory, though this name was rarely used. The common name for it was Skänninge Abbey, but as there was also a convent for Dominican friars in Skänninge, it was often called Skänninge Nunnery.

== History ==
The monastery was founded by Saint Ingrid of Skänninge, after her return from her pilgrimages in Europe. Having been widowed, she founded a convent and became its first prioress. Though founded in 1272, it was not formerly inaugurated before 12 August 1281, and it was given its privilege by Magnus III of Sweden in 1282. Coming from the elite of the Swedish nobility, Ingrid and her family was able to donate large estates to the establishment.

The convent was built around a church dedicated to Saint Martin, which became its chapel, and was therefore formerly named St. Martin's Priory. On 2 September 1282, its prioress, Ingrid, died, and the convent became the center of her cult and the target for pilgrimages.

The cult of Blessed Ingrid benefited the convent and made it rich, and it was a successful rival to the male monastery of the same order in the city. In 1353, Magnus IV of Sweden donated Bjälbo to the convent. It was fashionable among wealthy people to be buried in the graveyard of the convent, and large donations were made to it in connection with the burials. Bridget of Sweden placed her daughter Cecilia Ulvsdotter in the convent in the 14th century.

In 1505, the wealthy Dominican convent of St. John's Priory, Kalmar, moved its members to the convent and transferred all its property and privileges to it. The city of Skänninge also benefited from the cult.

In 1507, the translation of the relics of Ingrid was performed in the convent with great celebration in the city.

=== Dissolution ===
By the Swedish Reformation of 1527, Catholic convents were confiscated by the crown in accordance with the Reduction of Gustav I of Sweden and banned from accepting new novices, although the existing members were allowed either to leave their convents or to remain, supported by a royal allowance. In 1531, the king demanded that the nuns move to Vadstena Abbey, but they refused. In 1544, however, the nuns from Skänninge, as the nuns from Askeby Abbey had been in 1529, were forcibly moved to Vreta Abbey.

The remains of the abbey were excavated in the 1920s, 1930s and 1940s.

== Prioresses ==
The prioresses are only partially known:

- Ingrid of Skänninge (1281-1282)
- Katarina (1323)
- Alleidis (1348)
- Iliana (1357-1377)
- Humborgh (1380)
- Ärmegard, Ermegard or Ermegerdh (1383-1397)
- Ermegard (1412)
- Margit Finvidsdotter (1430)
- Ragnild Felagsdotter (1435)
- Petronilla Petersdotter (1448)
- Birgitta Petersdotter (1491)
