= Finstaätten =

Finstaätten was a franklin class family from Uppland, named after a farm named Finsta. The family has no real family name, and it was formerly sometimes called "Two Wings". The Finsta farm was also not a manor house in the true sense, which could merit the nobility house name.

Ancestors of the Finsta family had varying seals. The knight Erland Israelsson, lawspeaker Birger Persson's uncle, carried a cross between two wings. His son, the knight Johan Ängel, wore his grandfather's coat of arms, an angel, while Birger took up his mother's coat of arms: two black turned wings with wing brackets outwards on red. The wings may have been of silver, according to Jan Raneke, a Swedish medieval weapons expert. The ancestor Israel died before 1269. His son Jakob Israelsson, who died in 1281, was archbishop of Uppsala, and his grandson Israel Erlandsson was a bishop at Västerås.

== Sources ==
- Wernstedt Folke (1957). Older Swedish free families: ättartavlor. Bd 1. H. 1 (in Swedish). Stockholm: Riddarhusdirektionen. SELIBR 12871.
- Bengt Hildebrand. Finstaatten. Svenskt biografiskt lexikon.
