= The Revelations of Saint Birgitta of Sweden =

Book by Birgitta van Zweden

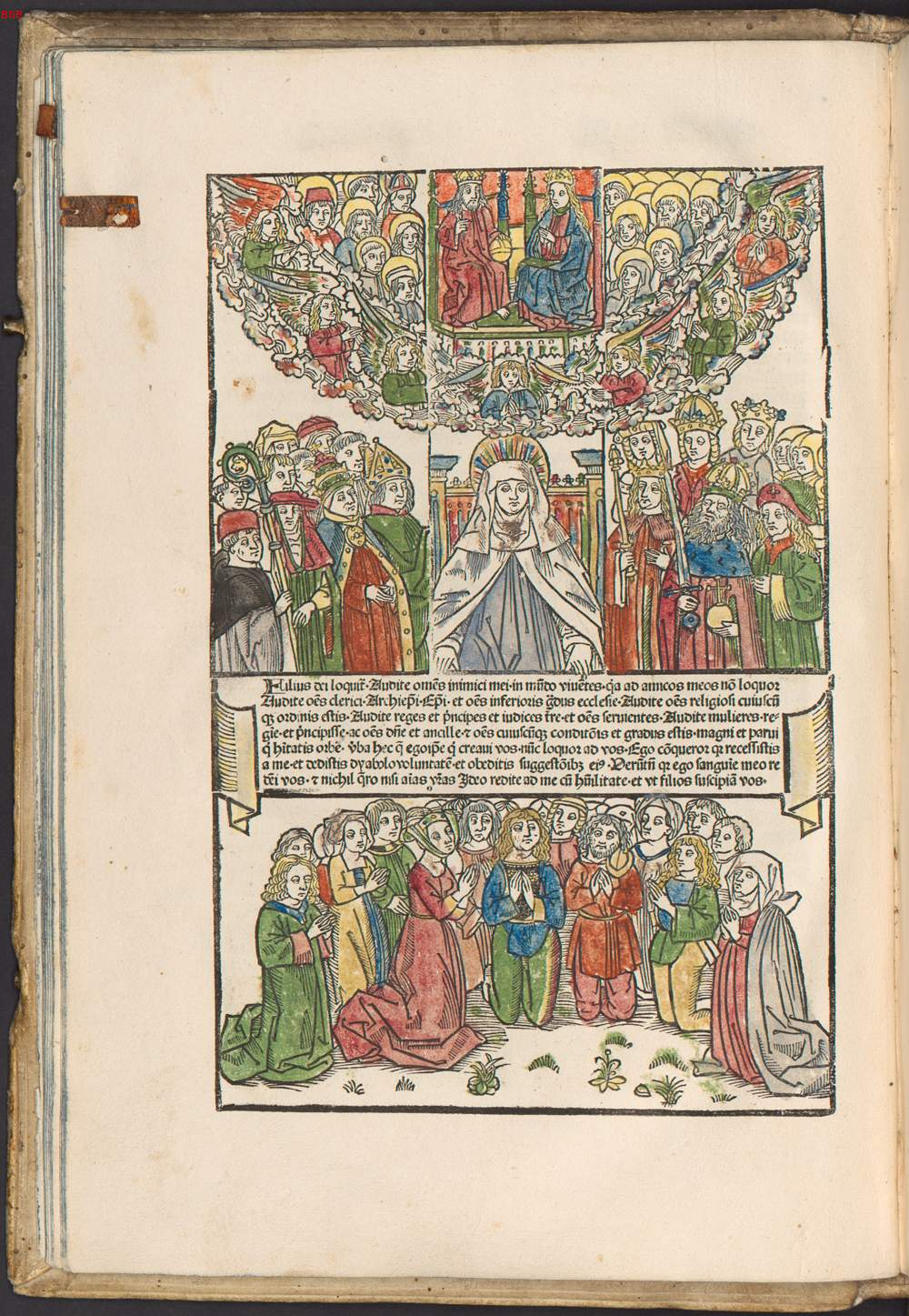
The Revelationes printed by Bartholomeus Ghotan 1492 in Lübeck.

The Revelations of Saint Birgitta of Sweden, or Heavenly Revelations (Latin: Revelationes celestes) is a large 14th-century book by Saint Birgitta of Sweden, a mystic and prophet.

The Revelations were written down between the years 1344 and 1373, in Latin by Petrus of Alvastra, Petrus of Skänninge and Alfonso of Jaén, either based on the Old Swedish originals or on the recitation of Birgitta. The work was printed first time in 1492 by Bartholomaeus Ghotan in Lübeck.

The work contains about 700 revelations in eight books, besides Revelationes extravagantes as supplement. The "Revelations" have been translated into most European languages and into Arabic. The first complete translation in English, The Revelations of St. Birgitta of Sweden, was made by Denis Searby.

Their content touches also on most of the political conflicts and ecclesiastical matters and debates of the time: the Avignon Papacy, the Hundred Years’ War, the legitimacy of secular and ecclesiastical rulers, the state of the priesthood, the Immaculate Conception of the Virgin Mary, apostolic life, the authenticity of relics, the Eucharist, and several other subjects. According to the Swedish church historian Herman Lundström (1952), Birgitta's revelations "contain a pure mysticism, rich in thought, and marked by deep insight into the inner mysteries of the devout life." They also " show traces of admirable anticipations of Reformation ideas. The conception of the universal priesthood appears here and there; in her personal devotion, she goes back to the eternal source of life and truth; and her rule commends the preaching of the Word to the people in the vernacular."

== Translations in English ==
- The revelations of Saint Birgitta of Sweden, translated by Denis Searby, with introductions and notes by Bridget Morris, 4 vols. (Oxford: Oxford University Press, 2006–2015) [Volume 1 has Books I–III; Volume II has Books IV–V; Volume III has books VI–VII; Volume IV has book VIII]
- Birgitta of Sweden, Life and selected revelations, edited, with a preface by Marguerite Tjader Harris; translation and notes by Albert Ryle Kezel; introduction by Tore Nyberg, (New York: Paulist Press, 1990) [Includes translations of The life of Blessed Birgitta by Prior Peter and Master Peter, and Books 5 and 7 of Revelationes, and the Four prayers from the Revelationes.]
- Saint Bride and her book: Birgitta of Sweden's revelations, translated from middle English, introduction, by Julia Bolton Holloway, (1992)
- The Word of the Angel (Sermo Angelicus). Saint Birgitta Of Sweden; John E. Halborg. Peregrina Publishing Co, 1996
- Arne Jönsson, St. Bridget's Revelations to the Popes : an edition of the so-called Tractatus de summis pontificibus, (Lund: Lund University Press, 1997)
