= Finsta =

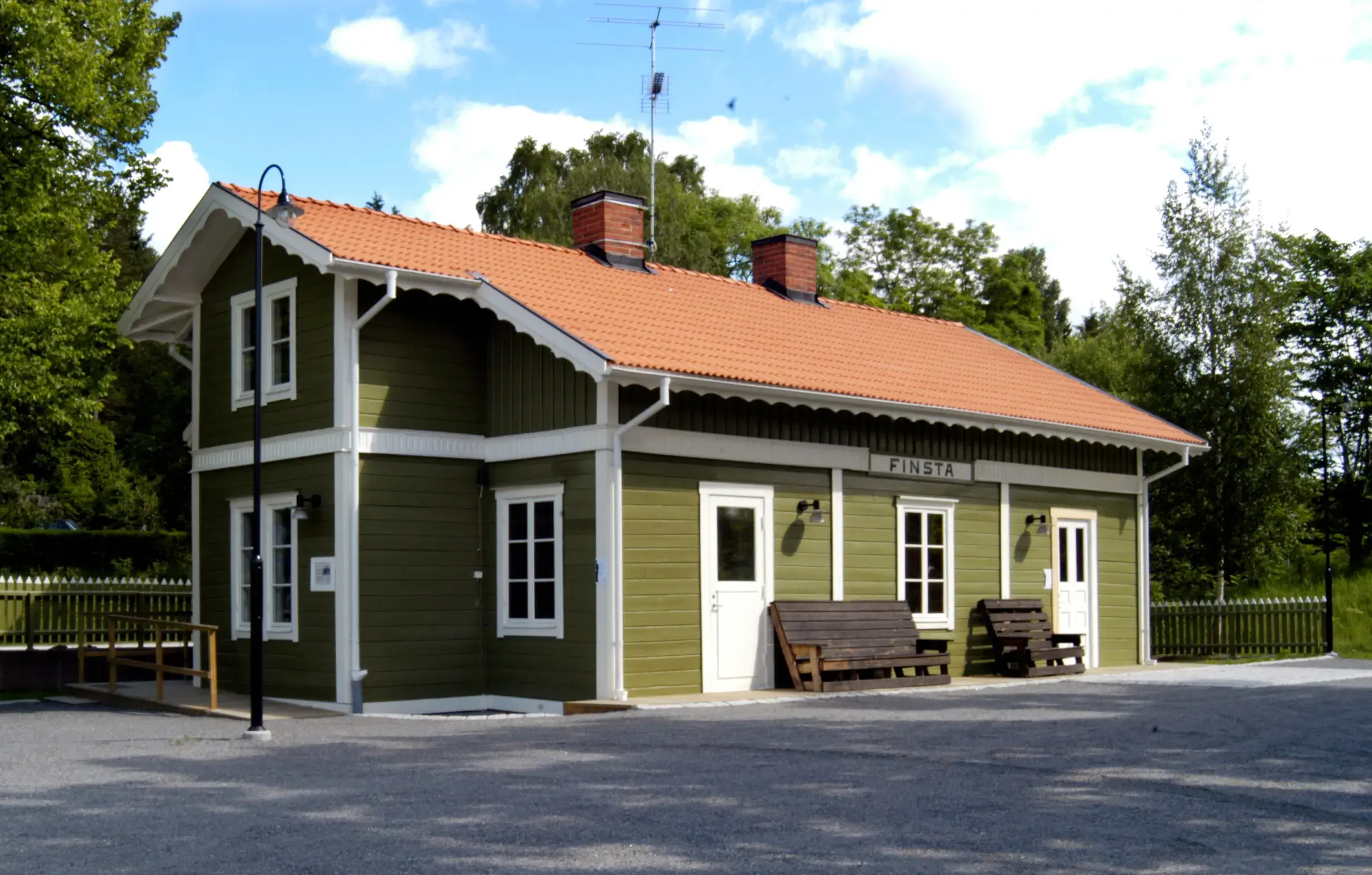
- Finsta railway station in 2003

- Location within Stockholm Location within Sweden
- Coordinates: 59°44′13″N 18°29′37″E
- Country: Sweden
- Province: Uppland
- County: Stockholm County
- Municipality: Norrtälje Municipality

Area
  - Total: 0.36 km^{2} (0.14 sq mi)

Population (31 December 2020)
  - Total: 248
  - Density: 690/km^{2} (1,800/sq mi)
- Time zone: UTC+1 (CET)
  - Summer (DST): UTC+2 (CEST)

Finsta (Swedish pronunciation: [ˈfɪ̂nːsta]) is a locality situated in Norrtälje Municipality, Stockholm County, Sweden with 244 inhabitants in 2010.

Finsta is according to local tradition the birthplace of Saint Bridget, one of Sweden's best known saints and the founder of the Bridgettine Order of nuns. Her father was the lawspeaker of Uppland and a local landowner; however other birthplaces have also been suggested.

== See also ==
- Finstaatten
