= Qaldoun al-Marah =

Qaldoun al-Marah قلدون المراح
- Village
- Location within Syria
- Coordinates: 33°52′31″N 36°41′11″E
- Country: Syria
- Governorate: Rif Dimashq Governorate
- District: An-Nabek District
- Nahiyah: An-Nabek

Population (2004 census)
  - Total: 2,561
- Time zone: UTC+2 (EET)
  - Summer (DST): UTC+3 (EEST)

Qaldoun al-Marah (Arabic: قلدون المراح, also called al-Mirah) is a village in southern Syria, administratively part of the Rif Dimashq Governorate, located on the northeast of Damascus, on the ancient caravan route to Homs and Aleppo, in the Qalamoun Mountains. Nearby localities include Yabroud, an-Nabek, al-Sahel and Deir Atiyah to the north, ar-Ruhaybah, Jayroud, al-Dumayr and al-Qutayfah to the south, and Ma'loula, Assal al-Ward and Hosh Arab to the southwest. According to the Syria Central Bureau of Statistics, Qaldoun al-Marah had a population of 2,561 in the 2004 census.

In 2019, practices and craftsmanship associated with the Damascene rose in the village were included into the UNESCO's intangible cultural heritage list as Intangible cultural heritage.
