= Al-Qastal, Damascus =

Al-Qastal القسطل
- Village
- Location within Syria
- Coordinates: 33°55′32″N 36°41′45″E
- Country: Syria
- Governorate: Rif Dimashq
- District: an-Nabek
- Subdistrict: an-Nabek

Population (2004 census)
  - Total: 3,486
- Time zone: UTC+2 (EET)
  - Summer (DST): UTC+3 (EEST)

Al-Qastal (Arabic: القسطل) is a village in southern Syria, administratively part of the Rif Dimashq Governorate, located on the northeast of Damascus, on the ancient caravan route to Homs and Aleppo, in the Qalamoun Mountains. Nearby localities include Yabroud, an-Nabek, al-Sahel and Deir Atiyah to the north, ar-Ruhaybah, Jayroud, al-Dumayr and al-Qutayfah to the south, and Ma'loula, Assal al-Ward and Hosh Arab to the southwest. According to the Syria Central Bureau of Statistics, al-Qastal had a population of 3,486 in the 2004 census. Its inhabitants are predominantly Sunni Muslims.

== History ==
Al-Qastal was visited by Syrian geographer Yaqut al-Hamawi in the early 13th century, during Ayyubid rule. He noted that it was "a place between Hims and Damascus where the caravans stop. It is said to be the name of the Kurah (or district)."

== Bibliography ==
- Le Strange, G. (1890). Palestine Under the Moslems: A Description of Syria and the Holy Land from A.D. 650 to 1500. London: Committee of the Palestine Exploration Fund. OCLC 1004386.
- Robinson, E.; Smith, E. (1841). Biblical Researches in Palestine, Mount Sinai and Arabia Petraea: A Journal of Travels in the year 1838. Vol. 3. Boston: Crocker & Brewster.
