= Battle of Qalamoun (2013–2014) =

Battle during the Syrian Civil War

- Part of the Syrian civil war
- Battle of Western Qalamoun (2013–2017) Syrian Government & Hezbollah control Lebanese Government & Hezbollah control Syrian Opposition control For a war map of the current situation in Rif Dimashq, see here.
Date	15 November – 15 December 2013 (1 month) (First phase) 10 February – 16 March 2014 (1 month and 6 days) (Second phase) 17 March – 26 April 2014 (1 month, 1 week and 2 days) (Third phase)
Location	Qalamoun Mountains (An-Nabek District and Yabroud District), Syria
Result	Syrian government victory
Territorial changes	Government forces take almost full control of the Qalamoun Mountains border region, including the An-Nabek District and Yabroud District

Belligerents
(Syria) Syrian Government; Hezbollah; Arab Nationalist Guard	Al-Nusra Front; Green Battalion; Islamic Front; Free Syrian Army Islamic State of Iraq and the Levant

Commanders and leaders
Gen. Badi Ali	Abu al-Malik al-Talli (WIA) (Qalamoun commander); Abu Azzam Al-Kuwaiti † (Qalamoun deputy commander Ahmed al-Assir (Lebanon commander); Ahmad Nawaf Durra † (Qalamoun commander); Bilal Kharyoush † (Qalamoun deputy commander); Salim Barakat † (Qara commander); Firas Qassem † (local Yabrud commander) Abu Ayman al-Iraqi

Units involved
Syrian Armed Forces; Syrian Army; National Defence Forces; Syrian Air Force; (Iraq) Iraqi militias; Liwa Abu al-Fadhal al-Abbas; Liwa'a Zulfiqar (Iraqi militia); Christian militias; Saidnaya NDF militias; Lions of the Cherubim	Katiba al-Bittar al-Libi

Strength
~10,000 Syrian Army troops (deployed for the assault on Yabrud); 15,000 Hezbollah fighters (opposition claim) "Several hundred" Christian militiamen	25,000–30,000 rebels

Casualties and losses
First phase: Unknown; Second phase: 180 killed (47 Hezbollah fighters; Army claim); 1,800 killed and injured (140 Hezbollah fighters; opposition claim)	First phase: 100 killed and captured (An-Nabk battle; Army claim); Second phase: 1,479 killed, including at least 13 commanders (Army claim); Low hundreds of losses (opposition claim)

The Battle of Qalamoun started on 15 November 2013, with air strikes on the town of Qara, in the strategic Qalamoun region, in an attempt by the Syrian Army to cut rebel supply lines to Damascus from Lebanon. The strategic region had been used by rebel forces as a rear base for its operations around the capital Damascus. For its part, government forces had been using the nearby highway to link Damascus with the central Homs province and had multiple weapons depots in the area. The battle was primarily led on the rebel side by the Al-Nusra Front.

== 2013 Army offensive ==
=== Capture of Qara ===
Between 15 and 17 November, 1,200–1,700 families, 90 percent of Qara, evacuated from the town over the border into the Lebanese town of Arsal, after the Syrian Army issued a warning that they were going to attack rebel forces in the area. In preparation for the offensive, thousands of Hezbollah fighters positioned themselves opposite the Qalamoun region on the Lebanese side of the border. For its part, rebels had been digging in for months, preparing a network of caves and bunkers in the mountains.

On 15 November, the military launched its offensive against Qara and the next day multiple air strikes hit the rebel-held town. Fighting was also raging near the towns of An-Nabk and Rima. The clashes led to the closure of the Damascus-Homs highway. Rebel forces in the area mobilised to counter the Army offensive.

On 17 November, government forces moved into the hills around Qara and were attempting to storm the town itself as more air strikes were conducted. Artillery was also used to hit the town. By the afternoon, government forces were not able to advance in the city despite repeated attempts and the constant bombardment.

On 18 November, government troops continued the offensive, capturing key positions in Qara, according to the pro-government al-Watan daily newspaper. The Air Force carried out several raids on al-Qalamoun and Yabrud mountains, as pro-government press sources claimed that the Army controlled large parts of Qara. A man who fled Qara into Lebanon described the attack on the town and stated "Qara is finished". Middle East security officials stated there were few signs yet of a massive Syrian armour build-up needed for an all-out assault on Qalamoun. They speculated that the government may conclude that dwindling rebel supplies from Lebanon would mean an all-out assault is not worth the cost.

On 19 November, government forces took full control of Qara. Rebels retreated from the town towards An-Nabk and Deir Attiyeh.

=== Rebel attack on Deir Attiyeh ===
On 20 November, a series of suicide attacks occurred against government forces in An-Nabk and Deir Attiyeh. A suicide car bomber targeted a military checkpoint while another blew up near a security headquarters, both on the outskirts of An-Nabk. In another incident, two Saudis tried to blow up the hospital in Deir Attiyeh but were stopped by government soldiers. In the attack on the checkpoint seven soldiers were killed and five wounded, while several soldiers died in the attack on the hospital. After the Saudi bombers exploded, five rebel fighters entered the hospital in an attempt to destroy medical equipment and kidnap a wounded Army officer and the Ikhbariya al-Suriya television crew. However, they were beaten back by the Army and the officer and crew were saved. Meanwhile, eight rebels were killed in fighting in the countryside around Deir Attiyeh.

On 22 November, rebel forces, led by militants from ISIL and Al-Nusra Front, mostly seized the largely Christian town of Deir Attiyeh. Only the Bassel hospital and a small hill remained under Army control.

On 25 November, the Army started deploying troops in Deir Attiyeh, in preparation to recapture the town, and soon after launched a counter-attack. The next day, the Air Forces hit Al-Nabk, killing seven people, including three children. Meanwhile, the Syrian Health Minister, Saad al-Nayef, accused the rebels of committing a "massacre" in Deir Attiyeh, killing "five doctors, five nurses and two ambulance drivers." Opposition activists confirmed five doctors and four nurses were killed in the clashes at the main hospital.

On 27 November, four Hezbollah fighters were killed in fighting in the Qalamoun region, one of them the nephew of the Lebanese Caretaker Agriculture Minister Hussein Hajj Hassan, a top Hezbollah official. At this time, fighting started in the area of the government-held town of Maaloula.

On 28 November, the Army recaptured Deir Attiyeh, with fighting continuing in the surrounding countryside.

=== Army push into An-Nabek, fighting in Maaloula ===
The same day the Army recaptured Deir Attiyeh, government forces entered An-Nabek and fighting raged around the town. A military source stated that if the town would to be captured, the Army would be left with only Yabrud and some other villages to take in order to completely block off the border with Lebanon.

On 29 November, the Army was shelling rebel positions in the town that had halted its advance. Government forces detained dozens of people in the western part of An-Nabk that they had captured.

On the night of 29 November, rebel forces started an attack on Maaloula, in an attempt to capture it and cut Army supply lines from Damascus to An-Nabk, after their previous attack on the town was repelled in September. In the early hours of the next day, the rebels broke into the town and captured the Mar Takla convent in the western part of Maaloula. Meanwhile, fighting was still continuing in An-Nabk, which was hit with several air strikes. The Air Force also attacked Yabrud.

On 1 December, fighting in Maaloula was concentrated in the old quarter of the town. Meanwhile, a suicide bomber attacked a police checkpoint on the Damascus-Homs highway, near An-Nabk, killing five government fighters. By this point, according to a Syrian security source, the military had captured 60 percent of An-Nabk.

On 2 December, the rebels moved into the center of Maaloula, after sending explosive-filled tires hurtling down from positions in the cliffs above the town on security forces deployed there. By this point, rebel forces captured the old quarter of Maaloula. The Army and pro-government militias fought during the day in an attempt to retake the district. Several nuns from the monastery were being held by rebel fighters and, according to a Vatican spokesperson, the 12 Syrian and Lebanese Orthodox nuns were forcibly taken north in the direction of Yabrud. During the evening, rebels had taken full control of Maaloula, with fighting continuing against government forces in the town's outskirts. At the same time, the Army captured most of An-Nabk and continued to advance through the town the next day. Due to the advances, the Army reopened the Damascus-Homs highway.

On 3 December, the Army sent reinforcements to Maaloula to link up with government forces still on the outskirts of the town and attempt to retake it.

On 6 December, government forces reportedly killed at least 18 people, including children, in an underground shelter in the government-held Al-Fattah district of An-Nabk. The opposition claimed that government troops torched the bodies after the killings "in a bid to conceal their crime". The next day, the number of those killed was updated to 40.

On 8 December, the Army advanced further, capturing new sectors of An-Nabk. The next day, the Army reopened the Damascus-Homs highway, after securing it for the most part. However, according to SOHR, the highway was still not fully secured due to continuing rebel attacks. On 10 December, the Army took full control of An-Nabk, with fighting continuing in its outskirts as a pocket of rebel resistance in a small area east of the town remained. State TV aired a live report from An-Nabk's main square in the center of the town. According to a pro-government newspaper, 100 rebels were killed or captured during the battle for the town.

On 11 December, government forces shelled the outskirts of Yabrud and the Rima area, as well as the outskirts of An-Nabk. Several air strikes were also conducted against Yabrud. By 15 December, the military was prepared to storm the town.

== Interlude ==
Early on 21 December, Hezbollah forces ambushed a group of Al-Nusra Front rebels on the Lebanese side of the border in Wadi al-Jamala, on the outskirts of Nahle, a mountainous area opposite the Qalamoun region. The rebels were attempting to infiltrate Lebanon from Syria via an illegal border crossing. 32 rebels and one Hezbollah fighter were killed and one Hezbollah fighter was wounded.

On 27 December, the Army ambushed a rebel force in a mountainous area between Maaloula and Yabrud, leaving 65 rebels dead and 20 wounded. The same day, 15 people were killed by landmines in the area between Yabrud and An-Nabk.

On 19 January 2014, more than 60 rebel fighters were killed in an ambush by government forces, while they were attempting to attack the Christian town of Saidnaya.

On 30 January, it was reported the Syrian army was preparing to start the battle for control of Yabrud. During this time, the Reema Farms had been witnessing violent clashes between the Army and the rebels, while the military captured the hills around Al-Neaymat and Al-Abboudieh, along the Syrian-Lebanese border.

== 2014 renewed Army offensive ==
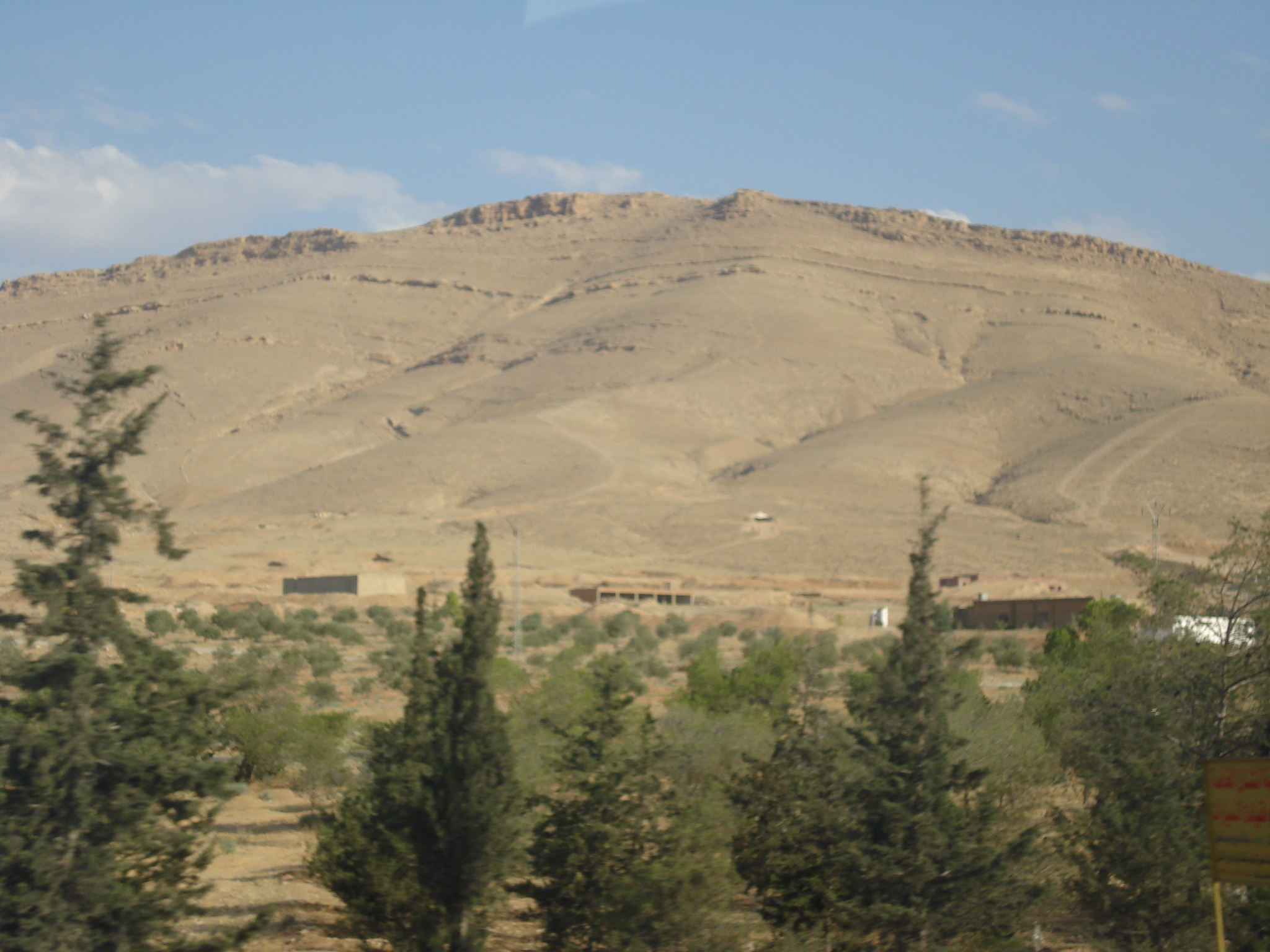
The Qalamoun Mountains

=== Battle for the hills ===
On 10 February, the military renewed its offensive against rebels in the Qalamoun mountains. On 12 February, the Syrian Air Force launched 20 airstrikes on Yabrud, while the Syrian Army captured the town of al-Jarajir, north-west of Yabrud near the Lebanese border. The next day, according to the pro-government al-Watan newspaper, the Army captured the town of Sahel, the al-Arid road, Qamieh and al-Kornish areas surrounding Yabrud.

Around 20 February, rebels ambushed a Hezbollah convoy near the Lebanese border while they were traveling towards the frontline. 27 Hezbollah fighters were killed.

By the end of February, according to a Hezbollah commander, government forces had captured 70 percent of the Qalamoun mountains.

On 26 February, a rebel commander was killed outside Yabrud, while rebels claimed that they continued to withstand the offensive. They also claimed that the government offensive failed in the Rima Farms region to force a breakthrough.

On 27 February, the pro-government Al-Watan newspaper reported that the Army captured two strategic hills near Yabrud that were being used by the rebels as supply routes.

On 28 February, rebel sources claimed that their forces captured "Flag" hill and that Hezbollah retreated from the Sahel front.

On 3 March, according to the Iranian Al-Alam news network, government forces recaptured Sahel and the previous day, the Army reportedly captured the strategic Al-Kuwaiti hill. Meanwhile, according to the SOHR, fighting was still continuing in the Sahel area, but government forces were advancing. A journalist for Hezbollah's television channel Al-Manar made a TV report from the village. Government forces were reportedly reinforced by an Iraqi militia for the assault. 17 rebels, 15 government soldiers and militiamen and four Hezbollah fighters were killed during the day's fighting and 30 rebels were captured. One of the killed rebels was Hussein Mohammad Ammoun, who orchestrated a car bomb plot involving a female terrorism suspect in Lebanon the previous month.

On 4 March, fighting was reportedly still continuing in the Sahel area, while reporters were taken on a tour of the village. A military commander also stated that the Army captured several hills and strategic positions on Yabrud's outskirts. To the north of Yabrud, in the Rima area, helicopters bombarded rebel positions using barrel bombs.

On 5 March, government forces in Sahel were preparing to advance towards Flitah and Ras al-Ma'ara. The next day, they pressed their offensive against Yabrud and captured the "Kuwait" and "Qatar" hills near the city. The Army also captured areas in the Rima Farms region. 17 rebels and 15 soldiers were reportedly killed in the fighting.

On 7 March 18 more rebels, 11 soldiers and one Hezbollah fighter were killed in fighting in Yabrud's outskirts.

On 9 March, the nuns captured by rebels in Maaloula, and held for more than three months in Yabrud, were released and were on their way to Damascus via Lebanon. By this point, according to an opposition TV station, 200 government fighters had been killed in the month-long offensive to capture the Yabrud area. According to a Hezbollah website, 40 Hezbollah fighters had been killed by 7 March.

On 11 March, after almost a month of fighting, government forces captured the Rima Farms region, positioning themselves directly facing Yabrud.

=== Battle of Yabroud ===
On 14 March, Hezbollah fighters in Lebanon approached Yabroud from the west as a diversion while Syrian Army troops attacked from the east, with fire support by Iranian militias provided to both forces. This left the rebels under heavy bombardment and caught in a pincer. The Army soon reached the eastern outskirts of the city. During this time, Hezbollah commandos conducted a raid within Yabroud in which they killed 13 rebel leaders, including the Kuwaiti Al-Nusra Qalamoun deputy commander, Abu Azzam al-Kuwaiti. This left rebel forces in disarray. In the meantime, the Army captured Aqaba hill, east of the town. This forced the rebels to retreat towards their rear bases. Government forces started entering Yabroud from the east and advanced along the town's main street, while rebels were retreating towards Rankous. Fighting was also taking place on the northern edge, between Yabrud and Sahel.

On 15 March, fighting was reportedly still raging at the eastern entrance of the city, with rebels sending reinforcements after they managed to regroup, while Hezbollah fighters were also fighting inside the town itself. Government troops managed to advance "hundreds of meters (yards) inside Yabroud", according to a military source. 15 air-strikes were conducted against the town during the day. One of the strongest rebel groups was sent to defend Mar Maroun hill, east of the town. However, rebels were soon surprised when the Army captured Mar Maroun without any notable resistance. Thus the Army captured all hills around the town. The lack of resistance raised suspicions that the rebel group in charge of defending the hill made a deal with government forces. After this, the Army controlled Yabrud's eastern approaches and northeastern boundary. Later in the day, government forces had advanced two kilometers inside the town towards a roundabout, according to state TV. The SOHR denied government troops had managed to enter the city and said they were still two kilometers away from it. In the evening, rebel commanders held a meeting during which they decided to abandon Yabrud, with only the Al-Nusra Front deciding to still stay and fight.

On 16 March, Syrian troops, backed by Hezbollah fighters, captured most, if not all, of Yabroud, after entering the eastern part of the town the previous night. Government forces had secured the town's main square, the Al-Akhzar Grand Mosque and the town's Catholic church. Most of the opposition forces withdrew at dawn. 1,000 rebels retreated to the mountainous border area near the Lebanese town of Arsal. Others fled to the nearby towns of Rankous, Flitah and Hosh Arab. A small hardcore group of fighters remained in the town to fight to the death. The fighters were trying to drag Army troops into urban warfare, where they believed they had an advantage. However, by this point, rebel supplies for the town were cut off and weapons that were promised to opposition forces never arrived. As the Army was moving into Yabroud, the Air Force fired four rockets near the barren hills of Arsal, possibly targeting smugglers supplying rebels in the area. In all, the Air Force conducted 20 air strikes during the day between Yabrud and Arsal and on the outskirts of Arsal, after hundreds of rebels poured into the area. By noon, the Al-Nusra fighters had also retreated from the town. Military sources stated 500–1,000 rebels had been killed since the start of the operation to capture Yabrud. The rebel's loss of the town was seen as a symbolic and practical blow for the opposition. Due to the loss of Yabroud, the rebels had no way of supplying their forces in rural Damascus, where government forces were surrounding a series of opposition-held areas, denying them food, power and clean water. According to a security source, the Army's next targets were going to be Rankous and Flitah. Later during the day, the Syrian Defense Minister, General Fahd Jassem al-Freij, inspected government troops in Yabroud. By the evening, opposition forces completely withdrew from the area and headed towards the surrounding western villages, particularly the plains of the nearby city of Rankus.

During the whole time that the battle was ongoing, the town was being hit by aerial bombardment from the Syrian Air Force and heavy shelling. The ferocity of the artillery strikes could be seen per one incident in which a group of 14 rebels was hit, leaving 12 of them dead and only two survivors.

== Third phase – Operations continue ==
On 17 March, the Lebanese army sent commandos to the border area with Syria, as Syrian rebels continued to flee into Lebanon after the fall of Yabrud. The Lebanese military detained 15 rebels trying to cross into Lebanon in the northern Akkar region of Wadi Khaled. According to a Syrian Army source, 1,400 rebels from the FSA, Ahrar al-Sham and other groups had fled Yabrud in the previous two days, while 1,000 militants from the Al-Nusra Front remained to fight in the town, but they also eventually retreated. During the final fighting for Yabrud, 19 Hezbollah fighters were killed. Government forces shelled Flitah, as they prepared to assault the last rebel-held areas in the Qalamoun mountains, which includes Ras al-Maarra and Flitah, northwest of Yabrud, and Rankus to the south. This would mark the start of the Army's third phase to capture the whole mountain range. During the evening, a pro-government source reported that government troops had broken through the frontline at Ras al-Maarra.

On 18 March, many unconfirmed claims surfaced from cities in the Qalamoun mountains, claiming a will to negotiate with government forces to spare the numerous cities south of Yabrud, including Maalula, of an Army offensive. Army troops were advancing towards Ras al-Ain, southwest of Yabrud, and captured several hills overlooking the village. Later, it was reported the military and Hezbollah entered Ras al-Ain and were progressing. Meanwhile, northwest of Yabrud, the Army entered Ras al-Maarra and captured large parts of it.

On 19 March, the rebel's central front in the mountains appeared to be collapsing as the Army captured Ras al-Ain, after two days of fighting. The military seized a factory in the village for manufacturing bombs, including car-bombs which bore Lebanese licence plaits. Meanwhile, fierce fighting raged between Army and rebel forces at a checkpoint near Rankus, while government troops were also fighting rebel and jihadist forces around the villages of Bkhaa and Jobeh in the Qalamoun region. Later, fighting also erupted in Rankus itself. Rebel commander Abu Omar Al-Farouq claimed, via the pro-opposition Syria Newsdesk, that "dozens of battalions" were stationed in the hills surrounding Yabrud and were "awaiting orders to move towards the city", but he admitted that the previous withdrawal from the town resulted in a state of confusion among the rebels and "divided and dispersed their forces".

On 20 March, a pro-government source claimed that Rankus would fall to the Army in a matter of hours. The next day, the same source, claimed that the military captured Rankus, but this was not independently confirmed.

On 23 March, a special Hezbollah unit infiltrated 11 kilometers deep inside rebel-held territory in the Qalamoun region and planted bombs inside the garden of a house frequented by three rebel car-bomb experts. When the experts arrived, along with four of their bodyguards, the bombs were detonated killing all seven of them.

During the evening of 26 March, the Army and Hezbollah advanced on Flitah and attacked it in an attempt to capture the town. By the next day, the attack had been halted as the military shelled Flitah. Among those killed in the fighting was the commander of the rebel Military Council of Qalamoun and his deputy.

On 28 March, rebels in Flitah appeared to be on the verge of collapse and the next day, the Army captured Flitah and Ras Al-Maar, leaving only Rankus to be captured by government forces before completely cutting rebel supplies from Lebanon into Qalamoun.

On 31 March, it was reported by the SOHR that an Army Colonel was killed in the fighting and two days later, according to the SOHR, "a dozen" government fighters were killed and wounded in a rebel ambush, while two rebels were reportedly killed in the clashes.

On 7 April, fighting raged around al-Sarkha, near Rankus, with government forces reportedly advancing. Later, the Fars News Agency reported the military managed to capture al-Sarkha and thus had broken through the rebel's first line of defense of Rankus. The SOHR also confirmed the Army had advanced towards Rankus.

On 8 April, the military captured the Saidnaya Observatory, near Rankus, after fighting that killed 15 rebel fighters. Later, fighting erupted in the outskirts of Rankus which left a rebel commander dead. The state news agency claimed government forces captured a hilltop overlooking Rankus as well as a few neighborhoods of the town. A military sources stated rebels were willing to surrender Rankus after their string of losses in the Qalamoun area. Meanwhile, the frontline at al-Sarkha was still reported to be just north of the village. During this time, rebels were retreating towards Zabadani, further south, and reportedly preparing for a last stand against the advancing government troops.

On 9 April, the Army entered the area of Rankus with heavy fighting subsequently erupting and a military source eventually reporting the military had captured the town. The SOHR also later confirmed government forces had captured Rankus, stating that as they entered the town there were no rebel forces a Rankus after a truce was reached a couple of days earlier between some of the town's residents and the government, which is why the residents demanded the rebels to leave the town. 140 rebels were reportedly killed during the battle for the town including an Iraqi al-Nusra commander, Abu Talha al-Baghdadi. Clashes continued on the edges of Rankus.

On 13 April, state television claimed the Army captured a string of hills overlooking Rankus.

On 14 April, the Army captured Al-Sarkha and recaptured Maaloula. Three Lebanese journalists from the pro-Hezbollah Al-Manar TV were killed during the fighting in Maaloula. Four soldiers also died as they tried to rescue the Al-Manar TV team. The Army had also secured the villages of Jibbeh and Jbaadin.

On 15 April, the military captured Assal al-Ward after rebels surrendered or retreated. The Army then continued on and captured Hawsh Arab that night. During the day, government troops were still fighting pockets of rebel resistance at a mosque in Maaloula.

On 20 April, President Bashar al-Assad visited Maaloula for the Easter holiday.

On 26 April, rebels in Zabadani surrendered and the Army captured the town, thus taking the last rebel stronghold in the Qalamoun region and on the Lebanese border.

== Aftermath ==
In late June 2014, following hit-and-run attacks by remnant rebel forces in the mountains, the Syrian Army and Hezbollah launched an offensive to clear the area of all remaining rebels. The situation escalated in early August when rebels came into direct conflict with the Lebanese military as well on the Lebanese side of the border in the town of Arsal.

On 19 August, a senior figure in the Islamic State, who had organised car and suicide bombings across Syria, Lebanon and Iraq, was killed. Some reports said that he was killed when a bomb, attached to his car, was detonated which was by Hezbollah Fighters. There were also several other reports that said that he was killed by the Syrian Army in the Qalamoun region.

== See also ==
- Cities and towns during the Syrian Civil War
- Timeline of the Syrian Civil War
