= Al-Jebbah =

Al-Jebbah الجبة
- Village
- Location within Syria
- Coordinates: 33°54′23″N 36°29′5″E
- Country: Syria
- Governorate: Rif Dimashq
- District: Yabroud
- Subdistrict: Assal al-Ward

Population (2004 census)
  - Total: 2,829
- Time zone: UTC+2 (EET)
  - Summer (DST): UTC+3 (EEST)
- Area code: 11

Al-Jebbah (Arabic: الجبة; also spelled al-Jibbeh) is a village in southern Syria, administratively part of the Rif Dimashq Governorate, located northeast of Damascus in the Qalamoun Mountains. Nearby localities include Ma'loula and al-Qutayfah to the southeast, Hosh Arab and al-Tawani to the south and Assal al-Ward and Rankous to the southwest. According to the Syria Central Bureau of Statistics, al-Jibbah had a population of 2,829 in the 2004 census. Its inhabitants are predominantly Sunni Muslims.

== Bibliography ==
- Robinson, E.; Smith, E. (1841). Biblical Researches in Palestine, Mount Sinai and Arabia Petraea: A Journal of Travels in the year 1838. Vol. 3. Boston: Crocker & Brewster.
