= Hala, Syria =

Hala حله
- Village
- Location within Syria
- Coordinates: 33°44′14″N 36°31′58″E
- Country: Syria
- Governorate: Rif Dimashq Governorate
- District: Al-Qutayfah District
- Nahiyah: Al-Qutayfah

Population (2004 census)
  - Total: 3,921
- Time zone: UTC+2 (EET)
  - Summer (DST): UTC+3 (EEST)
- Area code: 11

Hala (Arabic: حله) is a village in southern Syria, administratively part of the Rif Dimashq Governorate, located northeast of Damascus in the Qalamoun Mountains. Nearby localities include Ma'loula and Yabroud to the northeast, Hosh Arab, Rankous and Assal al-Ward to the northeast and Jayroud and al-Qutayfah to the east. According to the Syria Central Bureau of Statistics, Hala had a population of 3,921 in the 2004 census.
