= Al-Sahel =

Village in Syria

Al-Sahel السحل
- Village
- Location in Syria
- Coordinates: 34°01′N 36°39′E
- Country: Syria
- Governorate: Rif Dimashq Governorate
- District: An-Nabek District
- Nahiyah: An-Nabek
- Elevation: 1,499 m (4,918 ft)

Population (2004 census)
  - Total: 5,677
- Time zone: UTC+2 (EET)
  - Summer (DST): UTC+3 (EEST)

Al-Sahel (Arabic: السحل, also transliterated As-Sahel and As-Sehel) is a Syrian village in the An-Nabek District of the Rif Dimashq Governorate. According to the Syria Central Bureau of Statistics (CBS), al-Sahel had a population of 5,677 in the 2004 census. Its inhabitants are predominantly Sunni Muslims.

== Nearby cities and towns ==
City-Village	Distance	Direction
Ma`arrat al Bash	3.5 nm	West
Flitah (Meshrefah)	2.7 nm	West
al-Jarajir	4.1 nm	North
An-Nabek	5.0 nm	East
Ras al-Ayn	4.1 nm	South
Yabroud	3.4 nm	South

== Weather ==
Season	Temperature, °C	Rainfall, cm	Wind, km/h
Fall	15.3	0.8	5
Winter	2.5	2.7	5.5
Spring	13.5	0.0	6
Summer	22.5	0.0	5

== Bibliography ==
- Robinson, E.; Smith, E. (1841). Biblical Researches in Palestine, Mount Sinai and Arabia Petraea: A Journal of Travels in the year 1838. Vol. 3. Boston: Crocker & Brewster.
