= Al-Tawani =

Al-Tawani التواني
- Village
- Location within Syria
- Coordinates: 33°46′43″N 36°30′3″E
- Country: Syria
- Governorate: Rif Dimashq Governorate
- District: Al-Qutayfah District
- Nahiyah: Ma'loula

Population (2004 census)
  - Total: 2,446
- Time zone: UTC+2 (EET)
  - Summer (DST): UTC+3 (EEST)
- Area code: 11

Al-Tawani (Arabic: التواني) is a village in southern Syria, administratively part of the Rif Dimashq Governorate, located northeast of Damascus in the Qalamoun Mountains. Nearby localities include Ma'loula to the northeast, Hosh Arab and Assal al-Ward to the north, Hala to the south, and al-Qutayfah to the southeast. According to the Syria Central Bureau of Statistics, al-Tawani had a population of 2,446 in the 2004 census. Its inhabitants are predominantly Sunni Muslims.

== Bibliography ==
- Robinson, E.; Smith, E. (1841). Biblical Researches in Palestine, Mount Sinai and Arabia Petraea: A Journal of Travels in the year 1838. Vol. 3. Boston: Crocker & Brewster.
