= Harfush dynasty =

Lebanese family dynasty (15th-century to 1865)

Harfush آل حرفوش
- Flag of the Harfush dynasty
- Country: Beqaa Valley and Sidon-Beirut Sanjak briefly, Ottoman Empire
- Founded: 15th century (Beqaa)
- Founder: Ibn Harfush
- Final ruler: Ahmed
- Dissolution: 1865

The Harfush dynasty (or Harfouche, Harfuch, Harfouch, or most commonly spelled Harfoush dynasty, all varying transcriptions of the same Arabic family name حرفوش) was a dynasty that descended from the Khuza'a tribe, which helped, during the reign of Muhammad, in the conquest of Syria. The Harfush are considered the best-known Shiite group in the history of Ottoman-period Lebanon, when they controlled the Baalbek District and several parts of the Bekaa Valley. Their being Shiaa was a major factor in the rivalry between the Harfushes and the Lebanese Druze Maan family.

The Shia notables such as the Harfush emirs of Baalbek and Bekaa Valley were among the most sought-after local intermediaries of the Ottoman state. Later the Hamadas rose to power. They exercised control over multiple tax farms in the rural hinterland of Tripoli in the seventeenth century through complex relationships with both the Ottoman state authorities and the local non-Shiaa communities. The Harfush and Hamadas both belonged to Shia Islam in Lebanon, the Harfush emirate of the Bekaa Valley and the Hamadas of Mt Lebanon challenged the territorial extension and power of the Druze emirate of the Shuf. Unlike the Druze, the Shia emirs were regularly denounced for their religious identity and persecuted under Ebu's-Suud's definition of (Kızılbaş) heretics.

The Harfushes had been a regionally paramount dynasty since early Mamluk times and even served as patrons of local Shiaa shrines and scholars. To the Ottomans they were therefore always leading candidates for local fiscal and political offices, including for the military governorship of the sub-province of Homs, to which they were appointed to partially offset the influence of the increasingly hegemonic Druze emirate.

== History ==
=== Fifteenth century ===
The late Mamluk historian Ibn Tawq identifies an Ibn Harfush as a muqaddam of the Anti-Lebanon mountain villages al-Jebbeh and Assal al-Ward as early as 1483. Later, Ibn al-Himsi and Ibn Tulun mention one as deputy (na'ib) of Baalbek in 1498. The unnamed Ibn Harfush appears in an Ottoman archival source as early as 1516, when he and several other local notables signed a letter offering their submission to Sultan Selim I, but was executed in 1518 by Janbirdi al-Ghazali as a rebel.

=== Sixteenth century ===
There is no further word on Musa Harfush's eventual participation in the Yemen campaign (which was in fact directed against the forces of the Zaydi Shiite imam), and in later years the Harfushes would be appointed sancak-beğs of Homs and Tadmur rather than of Sidon. If nothing else, his being selected to lead a tribal auxiliary division in return for an official governorship in 1568, more than twenty years before the Ma‘n family received their emiral title, points towards both the possibilities and the limits of Shiite enfranchisement under Ottoman rule: the progressive monetarization of provincial government and the privatization of military power in the later sixteenth century created a context in which non- Sunni tribal leaders constituted viable, even ideal, candidates for local tax and police concessions, accredited by the state and integrated into the imperial military administrative hierarchy. Yet their success would also depend on their ability to hold sway locally, to transcend their narrow parochial bases, raise revenues and capitalize on western Syria's changing economic situation. The Harfush emirs were among the first in the region to be co-opted by the Ottoman state, but would in the long run not stand up to the competition of other local forces.

==== Turning Sidon-Beirut into a beğlerbeğlik ====
As elsewhere in the empire, administrative units such as sancaks, eyalets and tax farms were not precisely delimited but could be reorganized according to the government's needs or the assignee's personal importance. The Ottomans briefly contemplated turning Sidon-Beirut into a beğlerbeğlik under ‘Ali Harfush in 1585; starting in 1590 Fakhr al-Din Ma‘n and his sons held Safad and then Sidon-Beirut for many years as sancak-beğs.

=== Seventeenth century ===
==== Battle of ‘Anjar ====
The Harfush leader Emir Yunus al-Harfush was in a conflict with the Lebanese Druze lord Fakhr al-Din in the early 1600s because of that conflict Fakhr al-Din decided to pull into the Bekaa valley. The Harfush dynasty wanted to take over the Ma'an family realm during Fakhr al-Din's exile. Yunus had an ally, Mustafa Pasha who was the governor of Damascus. Yunus and Pasha wanted to take the sanjak of Safad from Fakhr al-Din. Fakhr al-din returned from Italy, marched across the Bekaa. He captured Mustafa Pasha and defeated the Harfush's Emir.

Bekaa Valley before and after the battle of ‘Anjar can be obtained from a recently published register of iltizam appointments for the province of Damascus. Covering the years 1616 to 1635, the register among other things provides documentary evidence of the Harfushes’ growing marginalization as well as of the rise of the Shihabis of Wadi Taym as new contenders for government tax farms in the region. Beginning in 1618, for example, around the time of Fakhr al-Din's return from Tuscany, Yunus Harfush came under pressure to renounce the income normally due to the emin of Baalbek from the village of ‘Aytha, after the mufti of Damascus (a native of ‘Aytha) had petitioned for it to be set aside for himself in the supposed interest of reviving and repopulating the area. Even in later years, after the Harfushes had retaken control of the Bekaa from the Ma‘ns and the mufti was long dead, the village remained formally excluded from their holdings. The register also sheds light on the administrative context of the fitna (strife) between the Harfushes and Ma‘ns in 1623–24. It corroborates local chroniclers’ claims that Fakhr al-Din offered to send the sultan 100,000 gold coins for the Baalbek tax concession, but casts doubt on the notion that the governor of Damascus simply ‘paid no heed’ to the offer or ignored the Sublime Porte's orders to instate him. Fakhr al-Din's offer was matched by Yunus, and the iltizam was reconfirmed to his son ‘Ali Harfush by the kadıs of Damascus and Baalbek immediately after the battle of ‘Anjar.

==== One of their well-known scholars ====
There was at least one Imami scholar from the Bekaa by the name of Harfush in the Ottoman period: Muhammad ibn ‘Ali al-Harfushi (died 1649), a cloth-maker, grammarian and poet from Karak Nuh, was apparently persecuted for rafd in Damascus and then moved to Iran, where he received an official state post.

=== Eighteenth century ===
==== The battle of Ayn Dara and the role of Harfush's emir ====
The Harfushes appear to have been back in control of Baalbek by 1702, when local accounts indicate that a Christian shaykh of ‘Aqura in Mt Lebanon entered emir Husayn’s (Harfush) service as yazıcı, or secretary, on account of his Turkish skills. In 1711, French consular reports suggest, Husayn Harfush gave shelter to Haydar Shihabi and then supplied 2,500 troops to help him wipe out his Druze rivals in the Battle of Ain Dara, and establish himself as sole emir of the Shuf. curiously not addressed in H. A. al-Shihabi or any other chronicles of the period.

==== Support to the Shiaa of Mount Lebanon ====
The Ottoman court historian Raşid (d. 1735) telescopes several important events into his official account (but omits the atrocities committed against the Shiaa villagers). The Hamadas, who were supported by the ʿAwjan as well as the Harfush, were caught in heavy snows while fleeing toward Baalbek. An estimated 150 men perished. Only the Khazins now prevented the wholesale slaughter of the survivors, by disingenuously claiming they had no permission from Maan to leave the province of Tripoli, and directed the imperial forces elsewhere. Still, Ali Paşa was not to be satisfied. A manhunt began for the Hamadas and their confederates, Shiaa or otherwise. Untold villages were torched, women enslaved, and severed heads brought back to Tripoli. In late August, he sent another army into the Ftuh just to pillage the farmsteads. In the course of an attempt to retrieve some of their animals, Husayn ibn Sirhan, his cousin Hasan Dib and several companions were caught and killed. In late October, when Abd al-Ghani al-Nabulusi visited Tripoli, Ali Paşa was still out "battling the pertinacious heretics, the Hamada faction".

==== Close alliance to the Orthodox ====
Like the Hamadas, the Harfush emirs were involved on more than one occasion in the selection of church officials and the running of local monasteries. Tradition holds that many Christians quit the Baalbek region in the eighteenth century for the newer, more secure town of Zahle on account of the Harfushes’ oppression and rapacity, but more critical studies have questioned this interpretation, pointing out that the Harfushes were closely allied to the Orthodox Ma‘luf family of Zahle (where Mustafa Harfush took refuge some years later) and showing that depredations from various quarters as well as Zahle's growing commercial attractiveness accounted for Baalbek's decline in the eighteenth century. What repression there was did not always target the Christian community per se. The Shiite ‘Usayran family, for example, is also said to have left Baalbek in this period to avoid expropriation by the Harfushes, establishing itself as one of the premier commercial households of Sidon and later even serving as consuls of Iran.

===== Siege of Zahle =====
Says a contemporary Christian historian of the siege of Zahle' in 1841: "The harfushes did not credit Zahle' only, but also all Christians in Lebanon. The Christians would have been humiliated if they had lost their battle (Zahle’) against the Duruze, who had (the Duruze) earlier won the battle in Deir Al Qamar" (The Harfushes stood behind the Christians and defeated the Duruze in the battle field of Zahle').

=== End ===
In 1865 the Ottoman government ordered to send the last Harfush emirs to Edirne in Turkey for exile; later most of them returned to Baalbeck, but others could not and stayed in Constantinople; subsequently Emir Ahmad bin Mohamad bin Soultan El -Harfouche was transferred to Cairo.

=== Effect of disappearance of the Harfush emirate ===
The abrupt disappearance of the Harfush emirate left the Shiite community of Baalbek bereft of any anciently rooted, indigenous social leadership, making it that much more of a likely venue for the rise of foreign-inspired, ideological mass movements such as Communism, Nasirism and the Hizb Allah in Lebanon's tumultuous 20th century.

After nearly four centuries of their rule, it ended in sorrowful conclusions. During and after their reign they were subjected to many kinds of wars; at times parts of their history were distorted or deliberately smeared, and some of their achievements were attributed to others. Nevertheless, because historical truth cannot be falsified forever, some judicious writers eventually spoke in their defense. In the end, these remain public figures recorded by history.

== Present ==
Today, the Harfushes still own large acres of lands in Baalbek, the main cemetery of Baalbek and two villages are left in their memory, the Harfouche village and the Mrah el Harfouch village. The name of Yunus al-Harfouche is also engraved on the oldest mosque in the city of Baalbek. Nowadays, in the city it is more frequently referred to as Al Harfouch family instead of Harfouch dynasty. However, in the local families of the Bekaa still hold Al Harfouch to their high standards as the heroic defenders of region and its people.

== See also ==
- Shia Islam in Lebanon

== Gallery ==
Ottoman official Document of retirement to L'emir Ahmad Harfouche.

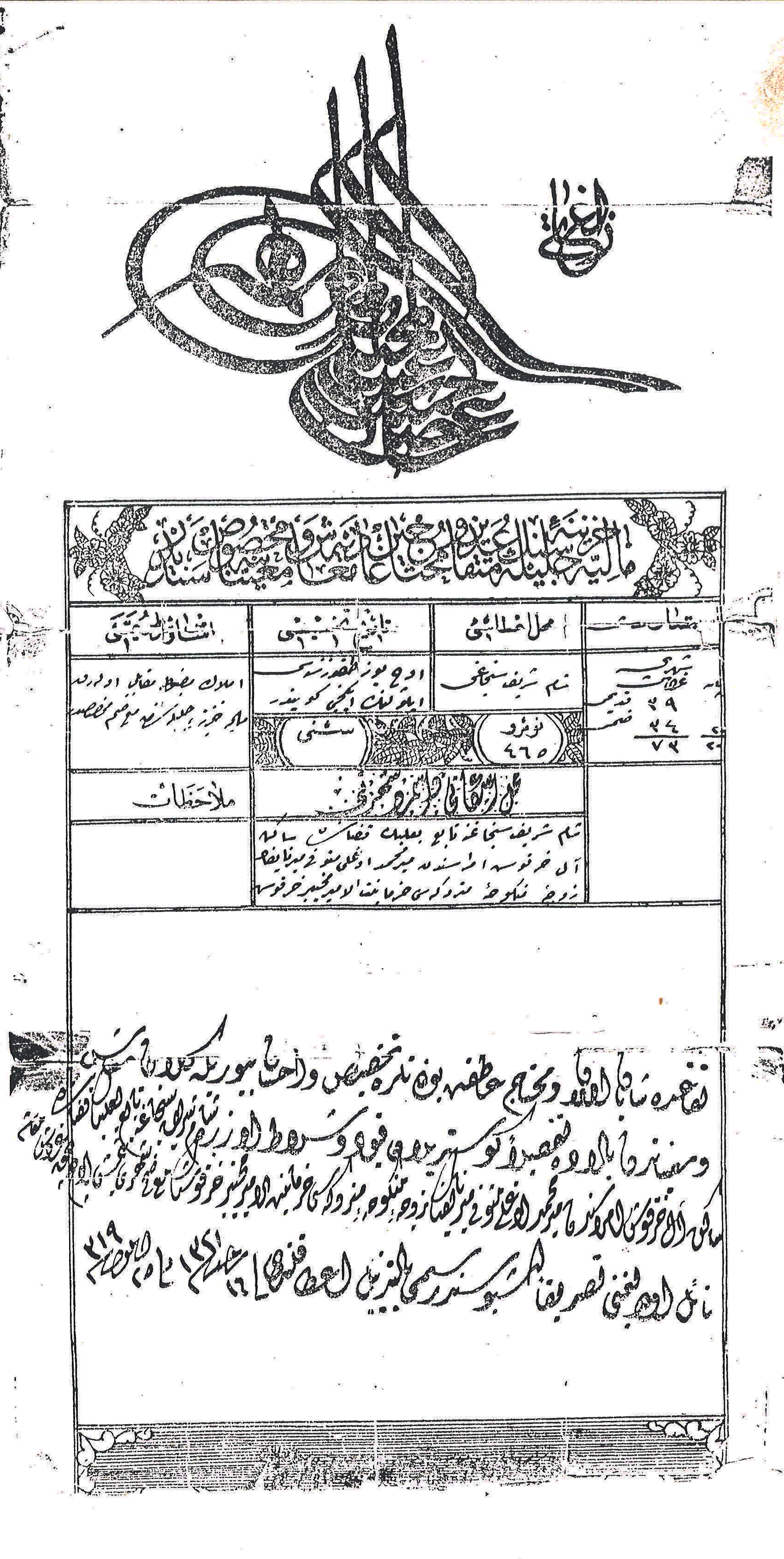
Ottoman official Document of retirement to L'emir Moukheiber Harfouche.

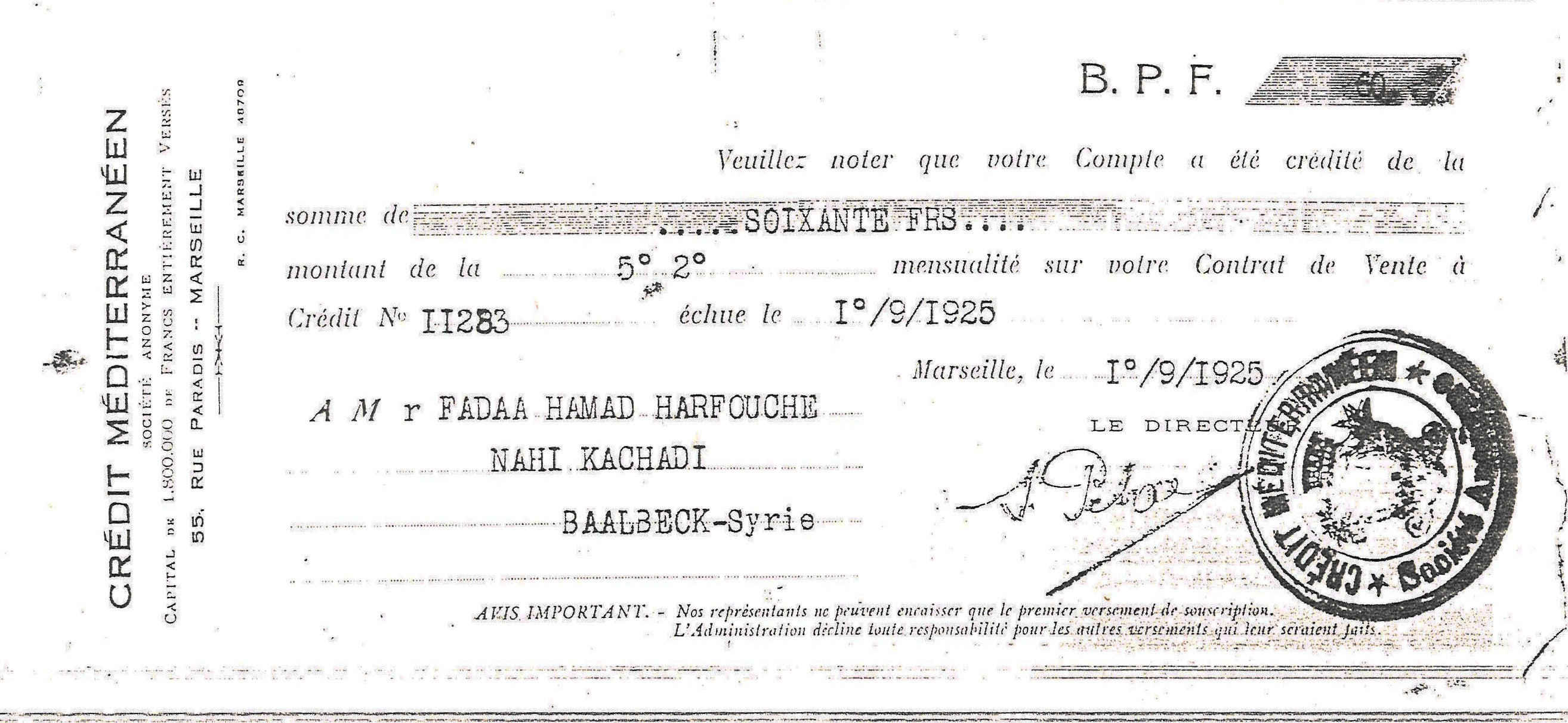
Cheque of banque credit mediterranean to the order of Fadaa Harfouche.

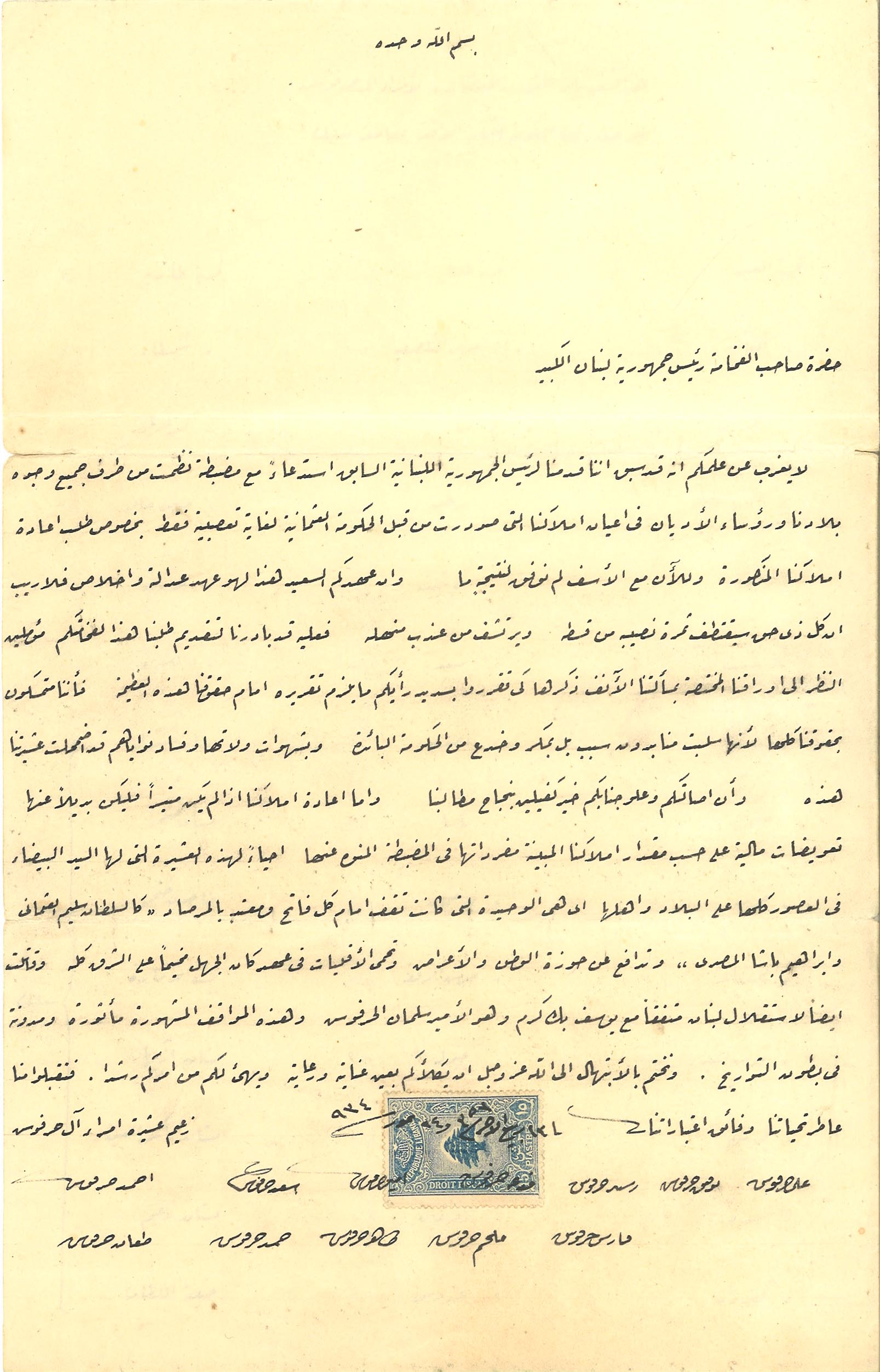
A letter signed by Emir Ahmad al-Harfush addressed to Habib Pasha El- Saad.

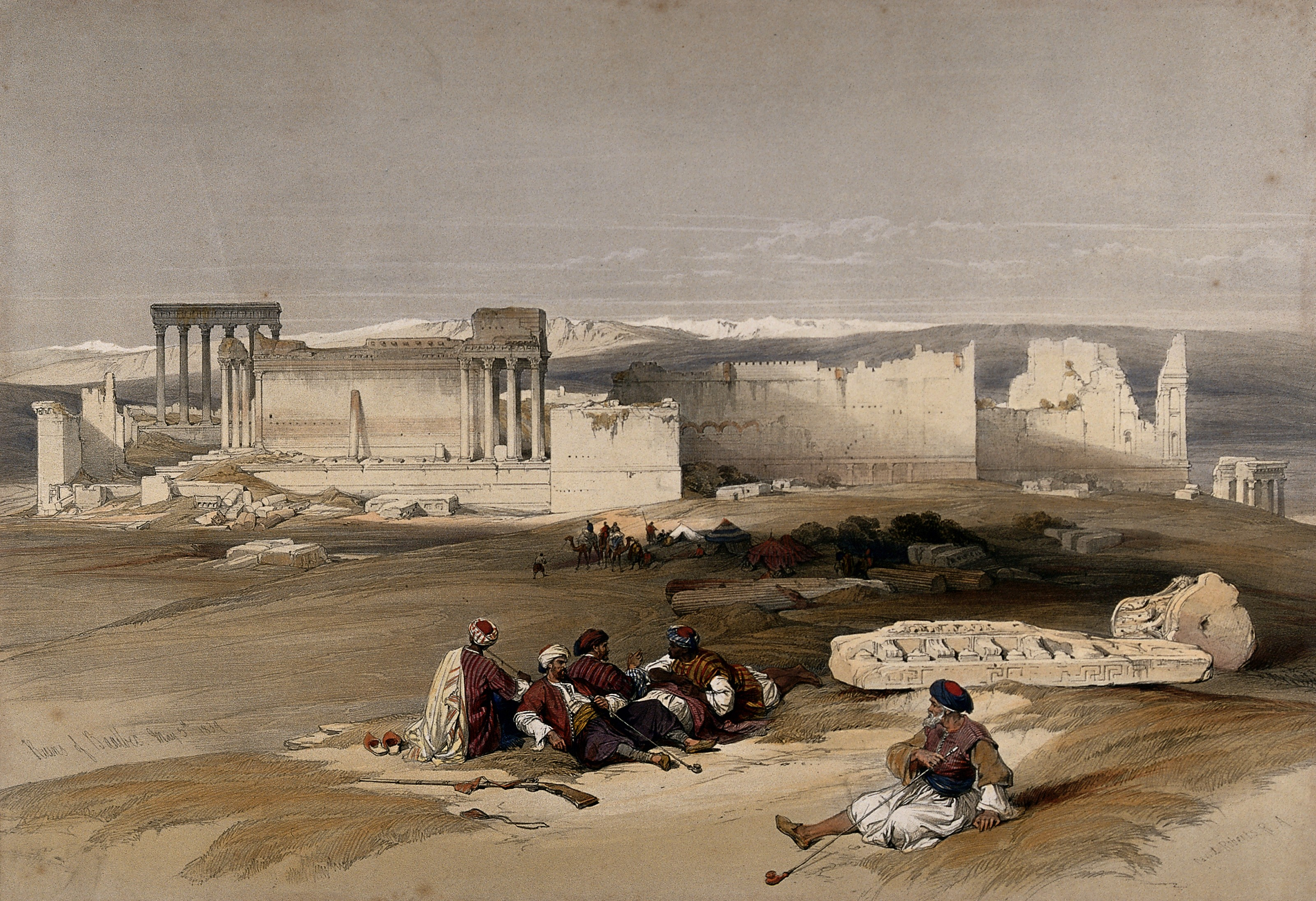
The ancient city of Baalbec. Coloured lithograph in The Holy Land, Syria, Idumea, Arabia, Egypt, and Nubia, after painting by David Roberts

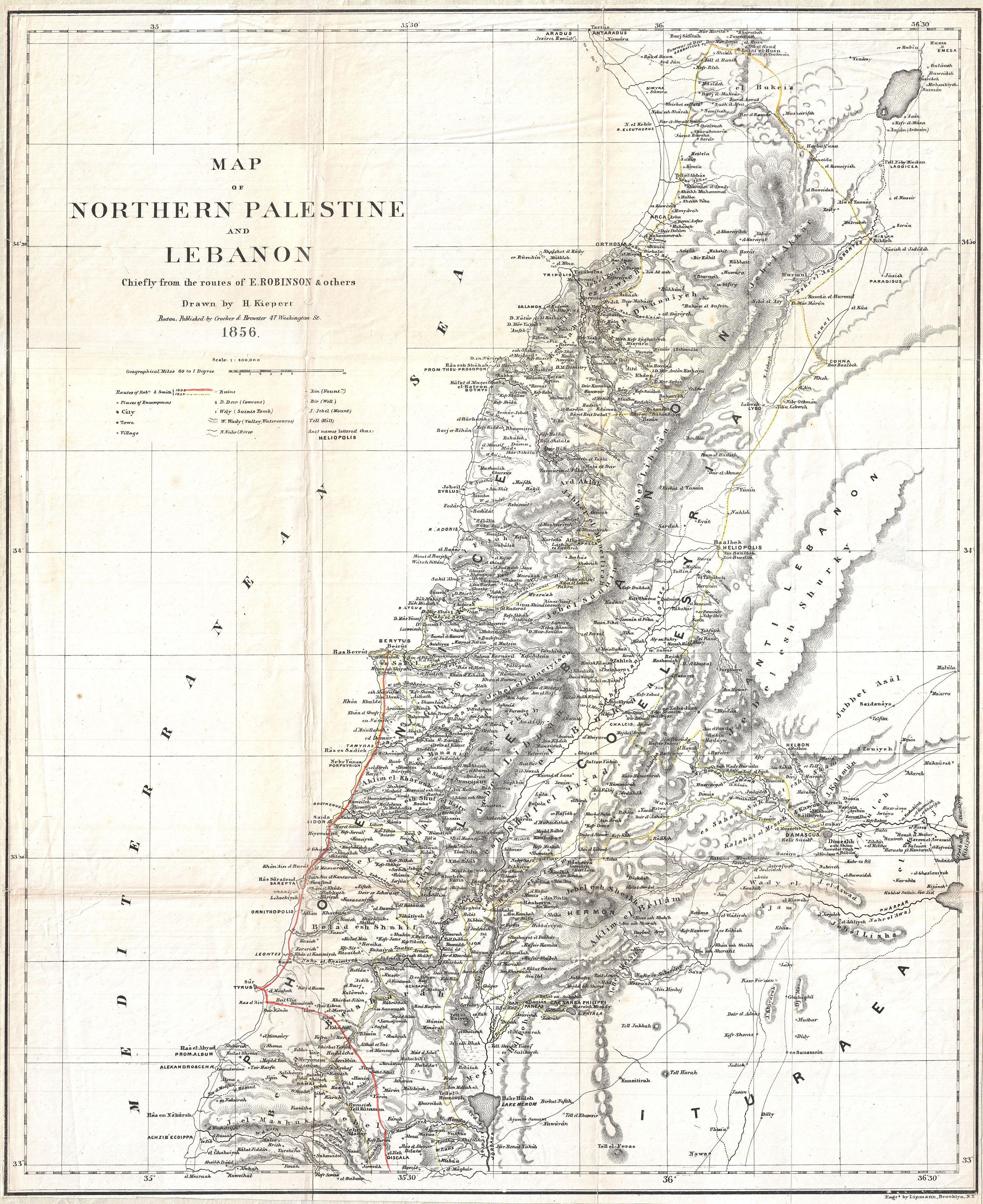
Kiepert Map of Lebanon 1856.

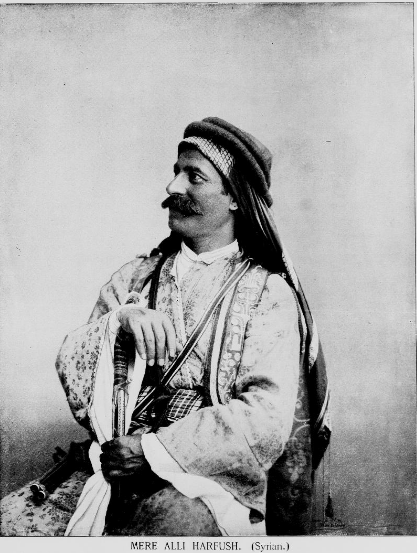
Emir Alli Harfush from Baalbec 1896.

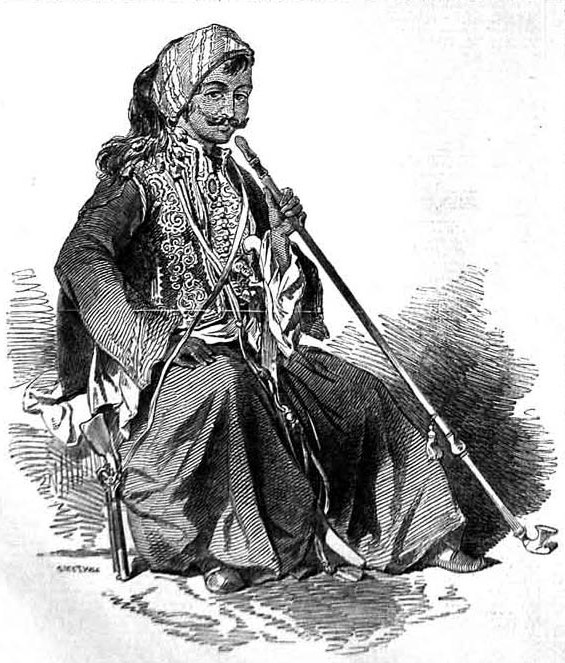
Emir khanjar Harfoush prince of Baalbec

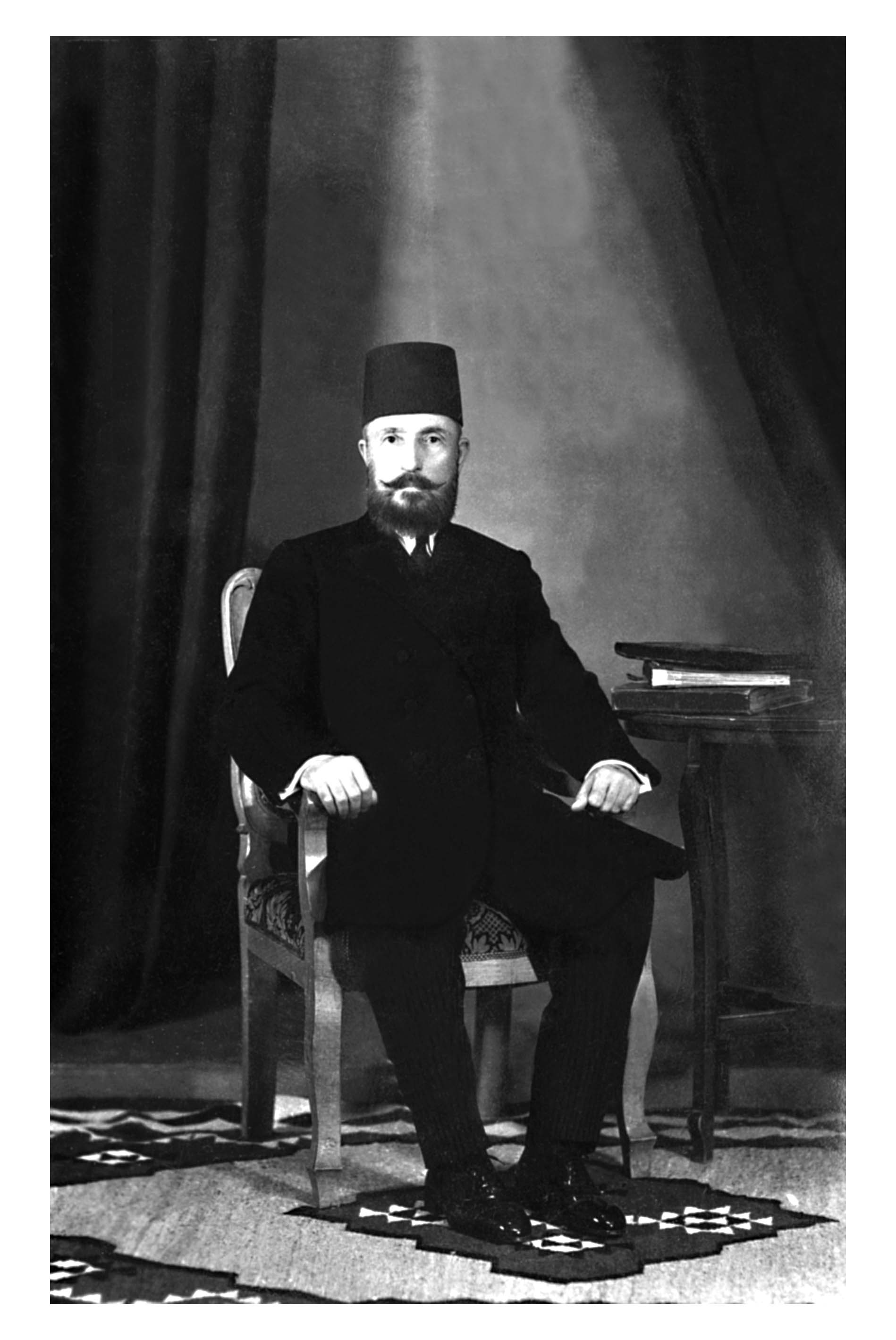
Emir Ahmad al-Harfush

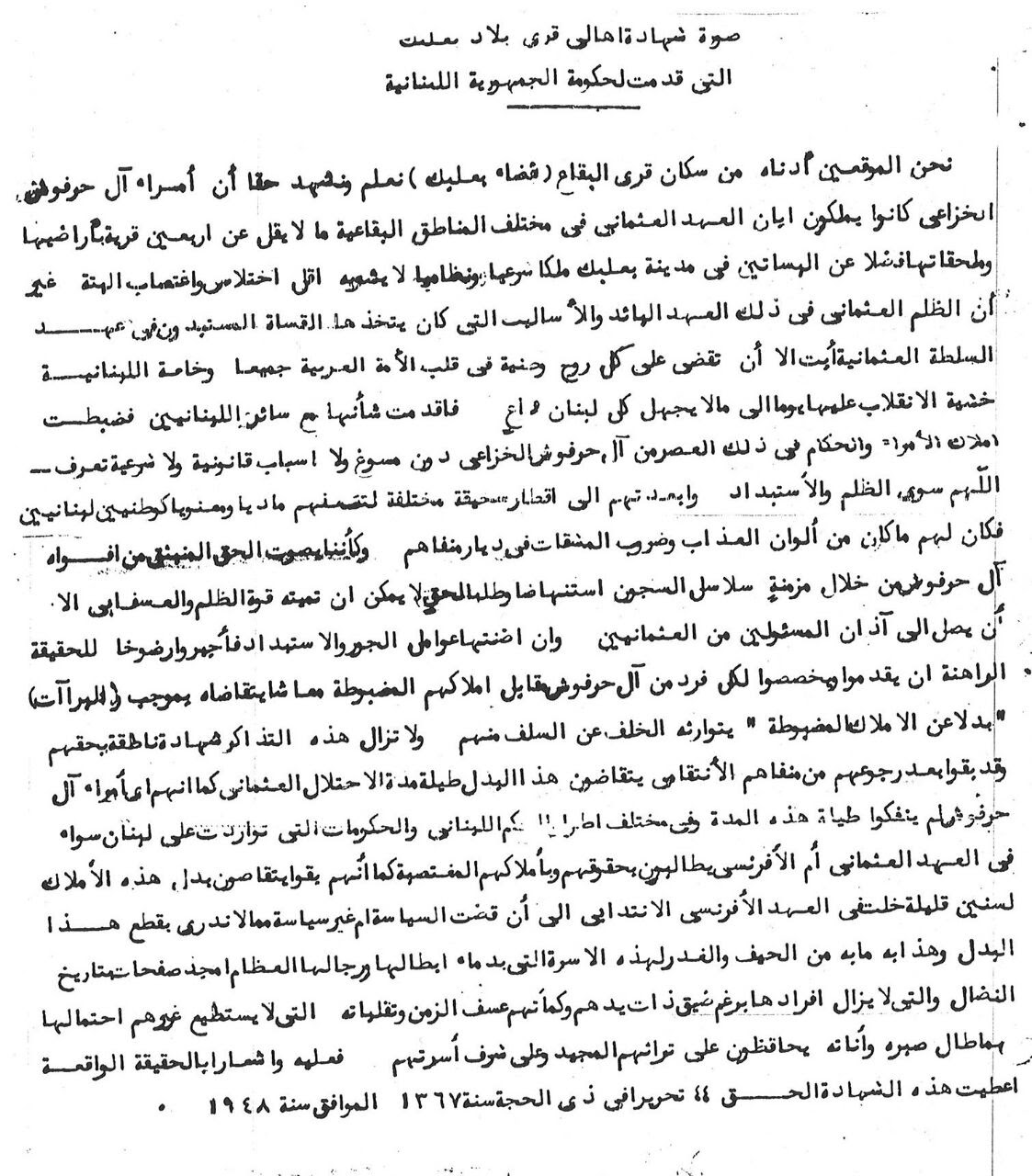
Testimony of the people of Baalbek regarding the confiscated properties.

== Sources ==
- Winter, Stefan (11 March 2010). The Shiaa of Lebanon under Ottoman Rule, 1516–1788. Cambridge University Press. ISBN 978-1-139-48681-1.
