= Mashrafet Flita =

Mashrafet Flita مشرفة فليطة
- Village
- Location within Syria
- Coordinates: 34.03140°N 36.58297°E
- Country: Syria
- Governorate: Rif Dimashq Governorate
- District: An-Nabek District
- Nahiyah: An-Nabek

Population (2004 census)
  - Total: 6,475
- Time zone: UTC+2 (EET)
  - Summer (DST): UTC+3 (EEST)

Mashrafet Flita (Arabic: مشرفة فليطة) is a village in southern Syria, administratively part of the Rif Dimashq Governorate. According to the Syria Central Bureau of Statistics, Mashrafet Flita had a population of 6,475 in the 2004 census.

== History ==
In 1838, Eli Smith noted Felita as being populated by Sunni Muslims.
