= Raheiba =

Syrian city

Al-Raheiba is a Syrian city administratively linked to Al-Qutayfah in Damascus countryside province, located about 45 kilometres (28 mi) north of central Damascus.
