= Al-Naseriyah =

Al-Naseriyah الناصرية
- Village
- Location in Syria
- Coordinates: 33°52′18.7″N 36°48′52.7″E
- Country: Syria
- Governorate: Rif Dimashq Governorate
- District: Al-Qutayfah District
- Nahiyah: Jayroud

Population (2004 census)
  - Total: 4,827
- Time zone: UTC+2 (AST)
  - Summer (DST): UTC+3 (EEST)

Al-Naseriyah (Arabic: الناصرية) is a Syrian village in the Al-Qutayfah District of the Rif Dimashq Governorate. According to the Syria Central Bureau of Statistics (CBS), Al-Naseriyah had a population of 4,827 in the 2004 census. Its inhabitants are predominantly Sunni Muslim.
