= Nebek =

Nebek may refer to:

- Paliurus spina-christi, a species of tree
- Al-Nabek, a city in Syria
