= Al-Atnah =

Al-Atnah العطنة
- Village
- Location in Syria
- Coordinates: 33°50′52″N 36°46′2″E
- Country: Syria
- Governorate: Rif Dimashq Governorate
- District: Al-Qutayfah District
- Nahiyah: Jayroud

Population (2004 census)
  - Total: 1,897
- Time zone: UTC+2 (EET)
  - Summer (DST): UTC+3 (EEST)

Al-Atnah (Arabic: العطنة) is a Syrian village in the Al-Qutayfah District of the Rif Dimashq Governorate. According to the Syria Central Bureau of Statistics (CBS), Al-Atnah had a population of 1,897 in the 2004 census. Its inhabitants are predominantly Sunni Muslims.

== Bibliography ==
- Robinson, E.; Smith, E. (1841). Biblical Researches in Palestine, Mount Sinai and Arabia Petraea: A Journal of Travels in the year 1838. Vol. 3. Boston: Crocker & Brewster.
