= Agnes Mariam de la Croix =

Lebanese Christian nun (born 1952)

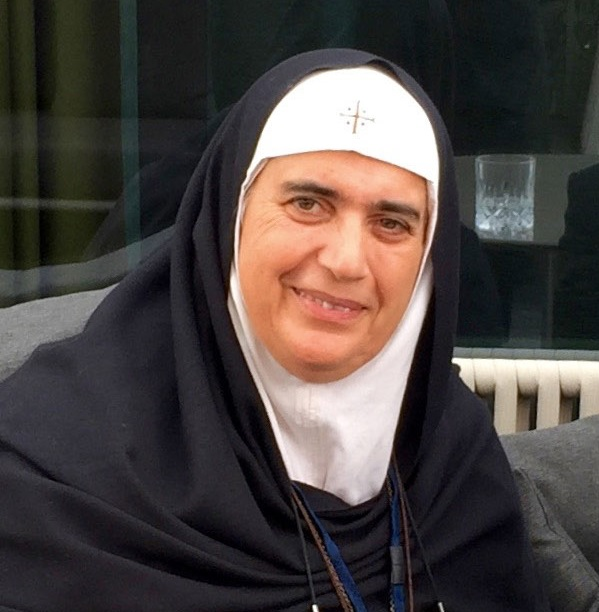
- Agnes Mariam of the Cross, in 2015
- Born: 1952 (age 73–74); Beirut, Lebanon

Mother Superior Agnes Mariam of the Cross (born 1952), also known as Mother Agnes, is a Lebanese Christian nun. She is mother superior of the Monastery of St. James the Mutilated in Syria, a Melkite Greek Catholic monastery in the town of Qara in the Homs diocese. She is outspoken in regard to the Syrian Civil War and, according to Foreign Policy is "one of the most prolific defenders of the" government of Bashar al-Assad.

== Early life ==
Born Marie Fadia Laham in Beirut, Lebanon, her Palestinian father had fled Nazareth at the time Israel was created in 1948 while her mother was Lebanese. After her education by French nuns, she became a hippie for 2 and a half years while travelling in Europe, India and Nepal. (“Lebanese marijuana is the best in the world,” she said.) While travelling she felt called by God. She then became a nun in the Carmelite order in 1971. She said worked to help displaced families from the Lebanon civil war.

De la Croix gained the consent of the religious authorities to work with the Melkite Greek Catholic Church in 1992, and moved to Syria about two years later with the objective of establishing a monastic foundation and restoring a monastery. Mother Agnes said at an event in San Francisco during her American tour in 2013: "I used to hate Syrians who came to Lebanon to bomb us every day" during the country's civil war, but "then the Lord called me to Syria to a blessed adventure to restore an ancient monastery that was in ruins" and she underwent a "conversion" after which she "learned never to hate anyone".

== Syrian Civil War ==
De la Croix has been accused by multiple sources of sharing Syrian regime propaganda and disinformation. According to the Committee to Protect Journalists, she "was clearly pushing the official line that the 'terrorists' were Islamic extremists bent on overthrowing a regime that she described as a protector of Christian minorities in Syria". In 2012, Father Paolo Dall’Oglio, a priest who had lived in Syria for 30 years but was expelled during the war, described de la Croix as "an instrument" of Assad’s government: "She has been consistent in assuming and spreading the lies of the regime, and promoting it through the power of her religious persona... She knows how to cover up the brutality of the regime.”

During the civil war, she used her close relations to the Assad government and connections to Christian circles in Western Europe to host visitors to Syria under the protection of the regime. After French journalist Gilles Jacquier was killed in Homs during 2012 (one of the first journalist casualties in the Civil War), his widow and two colleagues wrote a book in which they alleged de la Croix had been involved in a Syrian government plot to kill Jacquier. De la Croix had been serving as Jacquier's fixer, and put him on the bus to Homs the day he was killed, while she remained in Damascus with pro-regime journalists. De la Croix sued for defamation but lost the case, the court finding that "the words and acts which are the object of legal proceedings are not sufficiently specific" ('trop imprécis').

De la Croix also alleged that the May 2012 Houla massacre, in which the government killed over 100 people, was staged by the opposition and its victims in fact Alawites and Shia converts, a conspiracy theory that was promoted by left-wing activist Thierry Meyssan and subsequently reached some mainstream media outlets.

The same year de la Croix stated that, in Homs, 80,000 Christians were displaced by opposition groups, and that the majority of fighters were from outside Syria. The latter claim was disputed by, among others, an anti-Assad group named Syrian Christians for Democracy, reported The Independent. Interviewed by The Australian in October 2012, she said the rebellion "steadily became a violent Islamist expression against a liberal secular society."

She attempted to prove that Syrian opposition activists fabricated the videos showing victims of the Ghouta chemical attack in Damascus on 21 August 2013. She had no formal training in analysing video evidence or the use of chemical weapons, and compiled a 50-page report. She said the attacks were staged by rebels and the victims kidnapped pro-government Alawites, a claim rejected by family members of abducted people from that community. Her claims were investigated by Human Rights Watch and refuted, and the New York Times noted that part of her analysis was based on a misunderstanding of the difference between time zones. Sergey Lavrov, the Russian foreign minister, cited her analysis when he claimed there were "serious grounds to believe" the Ghouta attack "was a provocation", staged by Syrian rebels. De la Croix was interviewed by the Russian RT station about her analysis.

She said that in 2013, rebels based near her monastery warned her extremist fighters wanted to abduct her. The rebels helped her to flee.

She acted as government liaison during the evacuation of Moadamiyah (then under siege) at the end of October 2013. According to rebel spokesman Quasi Zakarya, up to 1,800 women, children and others were freed, but about 300 men were arrested by the government and forced to join the Syrian army. According to Raya Jalabi in The Guardian: "Asked whether she considers Hezbollah and Iran – entities which supported the Assad government – to be complicit in the fabric of foreign sectarian forces inside Syria, she said no, as 'Hezbollah isn't coming in as a religious force, and is not committing crimes of a religious nature.'"

In late 2013, De la Croix toured Israel (a country she told Ha'aretz that she "loved") and the United States, and visited Europe, presenting her version of events in Syria. Organised by the Syria Solidarity Movement, a pro-Assad organisation based in California formed to host her, she spoke at venues, mainly churches, on the US west and east coasts. Her US tour was as a representative of the Syrian Mussalaha (“reconciliation”) movement led by Ali Haidar, a minister in Assad’s government and leader of the far right Syrian Social Nationalist Party (SSNP).

In November 2013, she withdrew from speaking at the British Stop the War Coalition's annual conference after two participants, Jeremy Scahill and Owen Jones, decided not to speak at the meeting if it meant sharing a platform with de la Croix.

In 2013, de la Croix said she does not support the Assad government and describes herself as part of the liberal opposition to Assad. She said she supports the "civilian population who is suffering purely at the hands of foreign agents". After the Russian involvement in the Syrian civil war began in 2015, according to the Carnegie Endowment for International Peace, "Local voices, such as those of Mother Agnes, were amplified by the pro-Kremlin news outlet RT (formerly Russia Today), as well as by botnets and seemingly fake news websites, to create an appearance of widespread consensus over the Syrian regime’s version of events. This helped to blunt international responses to the conflict."

In 2018, she continued to host pro-government visits to Syria, telling participants that the government of Saudi Arabia, and not that of Syria, was responsible for refugees in Europe, because it wants the West to be Islamized.
