= Al-Humayra =

Al-Humayra الحميرة
- Village
- Location in Syria
- Coordinates: 34°10′18″N 36°50′49″E
- Country: Syria
- Governorate: Rif Dimashq Governorate
- District: An-Nabek District
- Nahiyah: Deir Attiah

Population (2004 census)
  - Total: 1,740
- Time zone: UTC+2 (EET)
  - Summer (DST): UTC+3 (EEST)

Al-Humayra (Arabic: الحميرة) is a Syrian village in the An-Nabek District of the Rif Dimashq Governorate. According to the Syria Central Bureau of Statistics (CBS), Al-Humayra had a population of 1,740 in the 2004 census.
