= Wadi an-Naaim =

Wadi an-Naaim وادي النعيم
- Village
- Country: Syria
- Governorate: Rif Dimashq Governorate
- District: Yabroud District
- Nahiyah: Assal al-Ward

Population (2004 census)
  - Total: 125
- Time zone: UTC+2 (EET)
  - Summer (DST): UTC+3 (EEST)

Wadi an-Naaim (Arabic: وادي النعيم) is a Syrian village in the Yabroud District of the Rif Dimashq Governorate. According to the Syria Central Bureau of Statistics (CBS), Wadi an-Naaim had a population of 125 in the 2004 census.
