= Al-Mansoura, Rif Dimashq =

Al-Mansoura المنصورة
- Village
- Location in Syria
- Country: Syria
- Governorate: Rif Dimashq Governorate
- District: Al-Qutayfah District
- Nahiyah: Jayroud

Population (2004 census)
  - Total: 878
- Time zone: UTC+2 (EET)
  - Summer (DST): UTC+3 (EEST)

Al-Mansoura (Arabic: المنصورة) is a Syrian village in the Al-Qutayfah District of the Rif Dimashq Governorate. According to the Syria Central Bureau of Statistics (CBS), Al-Mansoura had a population of 878 in the 2004 census.
