= Rima, Syria =

Rima is the name of the following villages in Syria:

- Rima, Qatana
- Rima, Yabrud
