= James Intercisus =

Christian saint (died 420 AD)

Saint James Intercisus
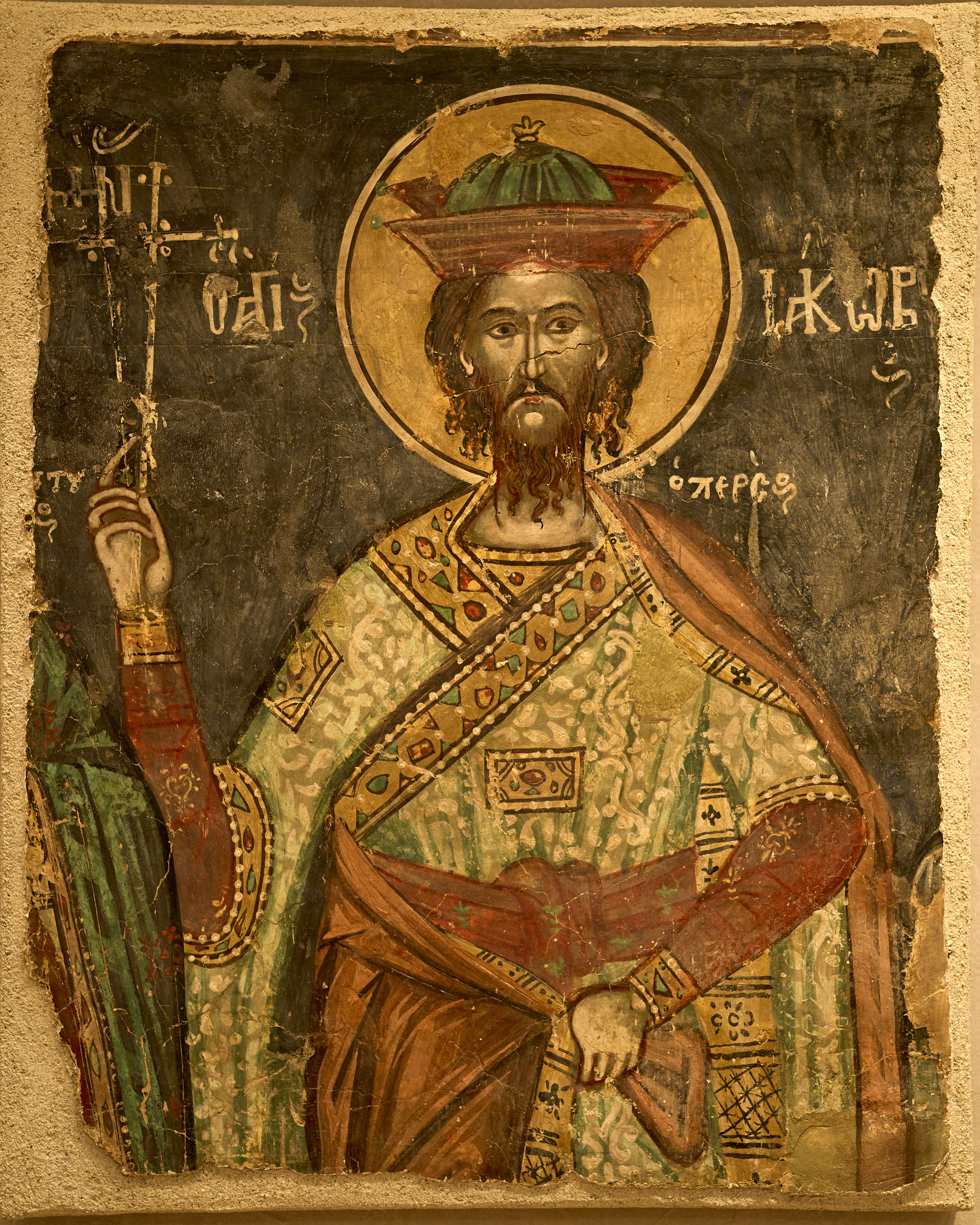
- Mural depicting Saint James Intercisus at the Byzantine and Christian Museum of Athens, Greece

Martyr
- Born: Beth Huzaye (Khuzestan, Sasanian Empire)
- Died: 27 November 420; Beth Lapat (Gundishapur, Sasanian Empire)
- Venerated in: East Syriac Christianity; Eastern Orthodox Church; Catholic Church; Oriental Orthodoxy
- Major shrine: Braga, Portugal
- Feast: 27 November; 27 Hathor (Coptic Christianity)
- Patronage: Deafness, Hearing Problems

James Intercisus (Latin: Jacobus Intercisus, (Ancient Greek: Ἰάκωβος ὁ Πέρσης; born in Beth Huzaye, died 27 November 420 AD in Beth Lapat), commonly known as Mor Yaqoub M’Pasqo Sahada (Syriac: ܡܪ ܝܥܩܘܒ ܡܦܣܩܐ ܣܗܕܐ, romanized: Mor Yaqōb M'pasqō Saḥāda), also called James the Mutilated, James the Persian or Jacob the Persian (also known in Cyprus as Akouphos), was a Christian saint born in Beth Huzaye in the city of Beth Lapat. His Latin epithet, Intercisus (or Pasqo in Syriac), is derived from the word for "cut into pieces," which refers to the manner of his martyrdom. His death, along with the persecution of other Christians in the Sasanid Empire, started the Roman-Sassanid War (421-422).

== Life ==
Tradition states that he was a military officer and courtier to Yazdegerd I who had apostatized after this ruler began to persecute Christians. He lived under the rule of Yazdgerd's successor, Bahram V, who heavily persecuted Christians. Under the influence of his Christian family, however, he expressed his faith to Bahram V, leading to his execution.

== Death ==
He was killed in Beth Lapat (Gundishapur). The ruins of this city are near Dezful, Iran.

At his execution, he survived the loss of limbs until he was beheaded. His followers requested to receive his remains as relics, but this request was denied; according to some they went on to steal them, after which they were sent to the Portuguese cathedral of Braga and put into a sarcophagus in the Relics Chapel.

== Legend ==
James' story is recounted in The Golden Legend by Jacobus de Voragine.

According to Katherine Rabenstein, he may be a composite character of James of Beit (who, having renounced Christianity under Yazdegerd, was shamed by his parents and changed his mind, becoming a martyr under the persecution of Bahram); Mar Peros (similarly shamed by his parents and martyred in 448); and James of Karka (a 20-year-old notary to Bahram, tortured alongside many others after casually remarking that he'd rather be cut into pieces than renounce God).

== Relics, churches and monasteries ==
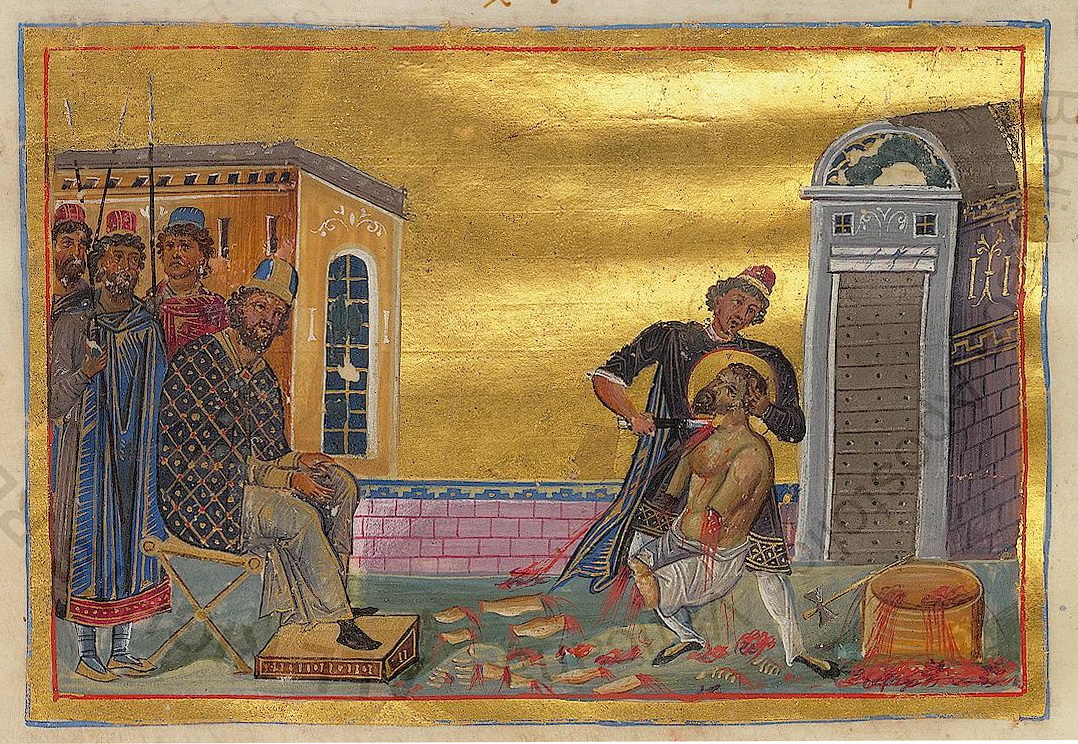
The martyrdom of James, from the Menologion of Basil II.

Guillermus Ludovicus, bishop of Salpi, gifted to the abbey of St Paul in Cormery, the place where he had been a monk, several relics, including the head of James, on 19 July 1103.

A piece of bone from the finger of James the Mutilated (Mor Yaqoub M’Pasqo Sahada) is kept in a golden casket in the holy cross (kurishupalli) dedicated to the saint in the Orthodox Syrian Old Church of St Peter & Paul in Pengamuck, Kerala, India. It was dedicated by Gregorios Geevargese (Parumala Thirumeni) and metropolitan Dionysious Joseph (Pulikkottil II), a native of Pengamuck, who had received the bone at his consecration as metropolitan by the patriarch of Antioch Ignatius Yakoob II.

Several churches and monasteries are dedicated to Saint James:

- Church of St. James Intercisus in the Armenian Quarter of Jerusalem
- Church of Saint Jacob Intercisus (ܥܕܬܐ ܕܡܪܝ ܝܥܩܘܒ ܡܦܣܩܐ Syriac: ‘ēdtā dmār ya’qōḇ mpassqā) in Tesqopa, Iraq
- Monastery of St. James the Persian in Sireți, Strășeni Moldova
- Monastery of St. James the Persian in Deddeh, Lebanon
- Monastery of St. James the Mutilated in Qara, Syria
- St. Peter's & St. Paul’s Jacobite Syrian Othodox Old Church, Pengamuck, Kerala, India

== See also ==
- Martyrs of Persia under Shapur II
- Persian martyr acts

== Bibliography ==
- Thieleman J. van Braght, Martyr's Mirror, 1660
