= Monastery of St. James the Mutilated =

Monastery in Qara, Syria

- Mar Yakub
- Interactive map of Monastery of St. James the Mutilated

Monastery information
- Other name: Jacques le Mutilé
- Established: 6th Century

The Monastery of St. James the Mutilated is a 6th-century Melkite Greek Catholic monastery in Qara, Syria. It is located 97 km (60 mi) north of Damascus and 15 km (9.3 mi) east of Al-Nabek. The monastery is dedicated to Saint James the Mutilated.

== Murals ==
The National Museum of Damascus holds a section from a fresco that once decorated the apse of the altar of the monastery's church. The fragment dates from the Ayyubid dynasty.

"The panel portrays a winged angel whose head is surrounded by a halo of light. His hair is long and his head is tied with a fillet. He wears white clothing and lifts his right hand in benediction, while holding a rope in his left hand. His gaze reflects piety and faith. The panel was executed in varying shades of brown and grey in addition to red, blue, and green.

Art historians note that the iconographic facial features are those of the Archangel Michael, one of the highest and most important of the angels. Indeed, the folds of the garments, the features of the face, and the style of shading conform very closely to depictions on the third-layer paintings of the Monastery of Mar Musa al-Habashi (St Moses, the Ethiopian) which lies nearby and flourished contemporaneously."

== See also ==
- Agnes Mariam de la Croix, a Mother Superior of this monastery
- https://www.maryakub.net/
