= Al-Jarajir =

Al-Jarajir الجراجير
- Village
- Location in Syria
- Coordinates: 34°4′59″N 36°40′4″E
- Country: Syria
- Governorate: Rif Dimashq
- District: an-Nabek
- Subdistrict: Deir Atiyah

Population (2004 census)
  - Total: 4,022
- Time zone: UTC+2 (EET)
  - Summer (DST): UTC+3 (EEST)

Al-Jarajir (Arabic: الجراجير) is a Syrian village in the An-Nabek District of the Rif Dimashq Governorate. According to the Syria Central Bureau of Statistics (CBS), Al-Jarajir had a population of 4,022 in the 2004 census.
