= Ibn Tawq =

Muslim notary and diarist

Shihāb al-Dīn Aḥmad ibn Muḥammad (1430–1509), called Ibn Ṭawq, was a Muslim notary and diarist from Damascus.

== Life ==
Ibn Ṭawq was born in 1430 into a peasant family from the village of Jayrūd outside Damascus. He also held land in the predominantly Christian village of Maʿlūlā. In Damascus, he lived near the Qaṣab Mosque in the quarter of Sūq Ṣārūjā just north of the Bāb al-Salāma gate to Old Damascus. His mother's family was from Damascus. In 1498, he moved to Maʿlūlā, where he stayed for at least a year and a half whlie his wife remained in Damascus.

Ibn Ṭawq belonged to the middle class, owned an orchard and several female slaves. He was a court clerk (kātib) and notary (shāhid). He adhered to the Shāfiʿī school of law, but did not hesitate to seek justice from a Ḥanbalī judge. He was just prominent enough to make it into the biographical dictionary of Najm al-Dīn al-Ghazzī, who describes him as a shaykh, imām (prayer leader), ʿālim (scholar) and muḥaddith (traditionist).

Ibn Ṭawq was married twice. With his first wife, he had a son and two daughters. His second wife, who belonged to a prominent family, had a daughter from a previous marriage. At one point he divorced and remarried her on account of an oath he took. They had five daughters who died in childhood and one son.

Ibn Ṭawq died in 1509.

== Diary ==
Ibn Ṭawq is known almost entirely for and through his Arabic diary, which he entitled Taʿlīq ("summary report"). The surviving portion of the diary covers the period from late 1480 to late 1501 with almost daily reports. Ibn Ṭawq also treated the diary as a sort of personal archive. According to Boaz Shoshan, there is "no comparable source for the pre-Ottoman era in terms of the density" of information than the Taʿlīq. It is the only surviving diary from the Mamlūk Sultanate.

== Bibliography ==
- Guo, Li (2008). "Review of Al-Taʿlīq, vols. 2–3, ed. Ǧaʿfar al-Muḥāǧir" (PDF). Mamlūk Studies Review. 12: 210–218.
- Ibn Ṭawq (2000–2007). Ǧaʿfar al-Muḥāǧir (ed.). Al-Taʿlīq: Yawmīyāt Shihāb al-Dīn Aḥmad. Presses de l'Ifpo. 4 vols.
- Shoshan, Boaz (2020). Damascus Life, 1480–1500: A Report of a Local Notary. Brill.
- Wollina, Torsten (2012). "A View from Within: Ibn Ṭawq's Personal Topography of 15th century Damascus". Bulletin d'études orientales. 61: 271–295.
