= Assal al-Ward =

Town in southern Syria

Assal al-Ward عسال الورد
- Town
- Location within Syria
- Coordinates: 33°51′57″N 36°24′48″E
- Country: Syria
- Governorate: Rif Dimashq
- District: Yabroud
- Subdistrict: Assal al-Ward
- Elevation: 1,850 m (6,070 ft)

Population (2004 census)
  - Total: 5,812
- Time zone: UTC+2 (EET)
  - Summer (DST): UTC+3 (EEST)
- Area code: 11

Assal al-Ward (Arabic: عسال الورد; also spelled Asal el-Ward) is a town in southern Syria, administratively part of the Rif Dimashq Governorate, located northeast of Damascus along the Syrian–Lebanese borders. Nearby localities include Hala, Hosh Arab and al-Qutayfah to the southeast, Rankous, Saidnaya, Douma and al-Tawani to the south. According to the Syria Central Bureau of Statistics, Assal al-Ward had a population of 5,812 in the 2004 census. The town is also the administrative center of the Assal al-Ward nahiyah which consists of three towns with a combined population of 8,766. Its inhabitants are predominantly Sunni Muslims.

== History ==
Assal al-Ward ("the rose makers") was long famous for its flower produce. The flowers produced in the town were supplied to the attar makers of Damascus. But unrestricted grazing reduced the town's once burgeoning yearly harvest of sixty to seventy Kantars (hundredweights) to one or one and a half by the end of the 19th century. During the early 1870s, the village was described as a "well-to-do place" with an entirely Shafi'i Muslim population. Armed men from the village possessed about 250 guns and were led by a local chief, Shaykh Salih. The inhabitants were noted for their hospitality, intelligence and willingness to fight. In 1874, the town was visited by British geographer, Sir Richard Francis Burton, and he noted that the town was affluent, with cool fresh air and healthy inhabitants. In its Quarterly Statement of 1892, the Palestine Exploration Fund described Assal al-Ward as a "village of a few hundred people" with a cool water spring.

== Geography ==
Assal al-Ward lies on a high plateau that starts at 1,600 metres (5,200 ft) between the Qalamoun and Anti-Lebanon Mountains. The large Tertiary-Quaternary basin of Assal al-Ward is watered by several springs, and drains northwards towards the towns of Jayroud and an-Nabek. The area's forest vegetation is dominated by Juniperus excelsa (Greek Juniper) which is observed between 1,880 to 2,200 metres (6,170 to 7,220 ft).

== Bibliography ==
- Burton, R. F.; Tyrwhitt-Drake, C. F. (1872). Unexplored Syria: Visits to the Libanus, the Tulúl el Safá, the Anti-Libanus, the northern Libanus, and the 'Aláh. Vol. 2. Tinsley Brothers. This article incorporates text from this source, which is in the public domain.
- Hastings, James (2004). A Dictionary of the Bible: Volume III: (Part I: Kir – Nympha). The Minerva Group, Inc. ISBN 9781410217264.
- Beck, Barry F. (1989). Engineering and Environmental Impacts of Sinkholes and Karts: Proceedings of the third multidisciplinary conference, St. Petersburg-Beach, Florida, 2–4 October 1989. Taylor & Francis. ISBN 9789061919872.
- Merlo, Maurizio; Croitory, Lelia, eds. (2005). Valuing Mediterranean Forests: Towards Total Economic Value. CABI. ISBN 9780851999975.
- Palestine Exploration Fund (1892). Quarterly statement. Vol. 23–24. Palestine Exploration Fund. This article incorporates text from this source, which is in the public domain.
- Robinson, E.; Smith, E. (1841). Biblical Researches in Palestine, Mount Sinai and Arabia Petraea: A Journal of Travels in the year 1838. Vol. 3. Boston: Crocker & Brewster.
- Royal Geographical Society (1872). The journal of the Royal Geographical Society of London. Vol. 42. J. Murray. This article incorporates text from this source, which is in the public domain.
