= Ras al-Ayn, Rif Dimashq Governorate =

Ras al-'Ayn رأس العين
- Village
- Location within Syria
- Coordinates: 33.56°N 36.217°E
- Country: Syria
- Governorate: Rif Dimashq Governorate
- District: Yabroud District
- Nahiyah: Yabroud

Population (2004 census)
  - Total: 2,754
- Time zone: UTC+2 (EET)
  - Summer (DST): UTC+3 (EEST)

Ras al-'Ayn (Arabic: رأس العين) is a village in southern Syria, administratively part of the Rif Dimashq Governorate, located southwest of Damascus. Nearby localities include Yabroud to the northeast, Ras al-Maara to the northwest, and Ma'loula to the southwest. According to the Syria Central Bureau of Statistics, the village had a population of 2,754 in the 2004 census. Its inhabitants are predominantly Sunni Muslims.

== Bibliography ==
- Robinson, E.; Smith, E. (1841). Biblical Researches in Palestine, Mount Sinai and Arabia Petraea: A Journal of Travels in the year 1838. Vol. 3. Boston: Crocker & Brewster.
