= Rima, Yabrud =

Coordinates: 33.9803°N 36.6790°E

Rima ريما
- Village
- Location in Syria
- Country: Syria
- Governorate: Rif Dimashq Governorate
- District: Yabroud District
- Nahiyah: Yabroud

Population (2004 census)
  - Total: 1,034
- Time zone: UTC+2 (EET)
  - Summer (DST): UTC+3 (EEST)

Rima (Arabic: ريما) is a Syrian village in the Yabrud District of the Rif Dimashq Governorate. According to the Syria Central Bureau of Statistics (CBS), Rima had a population of 1,034 in the 2004 census.
