= Muadamiyat al-Qalamoun =

Muadamiyat al-Qalamoun معضمية القلمون
- Town
- Location in Syria
- Coordinates: 33°44′31.4″N 36°38′36.7″E
- Country: Syria
- Governorate: Rif Dimashq Governorate
- District: Al-Qutayfah District
- Nahiyah: Al-Qutayfah

Population (2004 census)
  - Total: 14,228
- Time zone: UTC+2 (EET)
  - Summer (DST): UTC+3 (EEST)

Muadamiyat al-Qalamoun (Arabic: معضمية القلمون) is a Syrian town in the Al-Qutayfah District of the Rif Dimashq Governorate. According to the Syria Central Bureau of Statistics (CBS), Muadamiyat al-Qalamoun had a population of 14,228 in the 2004 census. Its inhabitants are predominantly Sunni Muslims.

== Bibliography ==
- Robinson, E.; Smith, E. (1841). Biblical Researches in Palestine, Mount Sinai and Arabia Petraea: A Journal of Travels in the year 1838. Vol. 3. Boston: Crocker & Brewster.
