= Gilles Jacquier =

French photojournalist and reporter

- Born: 25 October 1968; Évian-les-Bains, France
- Died: 11 January 2012 (aged 43); Homs, Syria
- Cause of death: Rocket attack
- Education: ESRA
- Occupation: Photojournalist
- Partner: Caroline Poiron
- Children: Apoline and Cloée (born 2010)

Gilles Jacquier (25 October 1968 – 11 January 2012) was a French photojournalist and reporter for France Télévisions. Jacquier worked as a special correspondent for Envoyé spécial, one of France's best known documentary programs which airs on France 2. He had a successful career, has covered major international military conflicts and won many awards during his life. He was killed on 11 January 2012 while covering the ongoing Syrian Civil War in Homs, Syria. Jacquier was the first Western journalist killed in Syria since the beginning of the Syrian Civil War.

== Biography ==
=== Career ===
Jacquier was born in Évian-les-Bains and started his career in 1991 as a reporter images for France 3 Lille. From 1994 to 1998, he worked for France 3 all around the world in many countries, such as South Africa, Japan, Nepal.

Then, he worked for France 2 from 1999 to 2006 as a reporter to the editor and have dealt with conflicts army in Iraq, Afghanistan, Kosovo. In 2002, Jacquier was shot and wounded near the al Ain refugee camp outside Nablus in the northern West Bank while covering the Second Intifada for France 2. Jacquier, who was wearing a bullet proof vest, was shot in the collarbone and recovered. Speaking of his experiences, Jacquier said in an interview, "I hate war but in war zone I can meet real people... Most of the time people are really themselves, very sincere in front of a camera and it's impossible not be moved by their suffering... Above all, I like filming people as close as possible to the action, with their emotions, but without voyeurism."

Since 2006, Jacquier worked for Envoyé Spécial and reported from all over the world. He worked as a war correspondent for more than twenty years. He shot and submitted most of his own footage. Jacquier reported on location from conflicts in Afghanistan, Algeria, Iraq, the Democratic Republic of the Congo, the wars in the former Yugoslavia, and, more recently, the Arab Spring from 2010 to 2012.

=== Personal life ===
Jacquier had a partner, Caroline Poiron. She is a reporter-photographer working for Paris Match. They have twin girls: Apoline and Cloée (born 2010).

Gilles Jacquier was the son of Georges Jacquier, who was baker and founder of a ski school at Bernex. His mother died two weeks after the birth of Jacquier's children. His grandfather was the mayor of Bernex for thirty years.

=== Death ===
In 2012, Jacquier entered Syria with a visa to cover the Syrian Civil War against Bashar al-Assad. Jacquier and cameraman, Christophe Kenck, were allowed to travel to the city of Homs, a stronghold of the opposition revolt, with the permission of the Syrian government. Pro-government nun, Mother Mary Agnes (Agnes Mariam de la Croix), was his fixer.

On 11 January 2012, Jacquier was interviewing local Syrian businesspeople and, at Mother Agnes' urging, traveled to a Homs hospital, when a pro-government demonstration organized nearby. It has been reported that Jacquier was killed in a rocket attack while in the field. and that seven other people were also killed in the attack.

His wife alleges that he was killed by the government, namely in a plot carried out by Assef Shawkat, Maher al-Assad, Ali Mamluk, and Michel Samaha. She also says he was killed either by a 22 millimeter gun associated with Syrian secret police or a long knife. Other journalists, including Jacques Duplessy, Patrick Vallélian and Sid Ahmed Hammouche, who were present in Homs the day Gilles Jacquier was killed also think the Syrian regime was responsible for this death. A regime defector also says Gilles Jacquier was deliberately killed in a planned government attack.

==== Context ====
Homs is a power base for opponents of the government of Syrian President Bashar al-Assad meet.

Two Swiss journalists, Patrick Vallélian of L'Hebdo and Sid Ahmed Hammouche of La Liberté, who were also working in Homs, accused the Syrian government of being behind the attack that killed Jacquier. Opposition groups also accused the Syrian government of orchestrating the Homs attack. Other opposition sources and Arab League observers blamed anti-Assad rebels. Arab League mission reports from Homs state that Jacquier was killed by mortar shells fired by opposition forces. This version is denied by his wife and colleagues, who consider the wounds do not match with a death by mortar. French prosecutors announced a murder investigation into his death, while the French government launched its own independent inquiry. The investigation by the French Ministry of Defence concluded that Jacquier had been killed in an attack carried out by anti-Assad rebels. Caroline Poiron, Jacquier's wife, published the book Attentat Express in June 2013 with Vallélian and Hammouche that accuses Syrian government intelligence of a planned killing of her husband.

== Reactions and awards ==
=== Reactions ===
The news director for France Télévisions, Thierry Thuillier, called Jacquier one of the best journalists working for the group. On 23 January 2012, France Télévisions named one of its studios "studio Gilles Jacquier" to honor him.

=== Awards ===
Jacquier and his colleague, Bertrand Coq, jointly won the 2003 audiovisual Albert Londres Prize for their work on the France 2 documentary, Naplouse, on the Second Intifada in the Palestinian Territories.

In 2007, Jacquier won the TV Journalism Ilari Alpi 2007 for "Ukraine, the last frontier", a reportage from Envoyé Spécial. In 2009, he also won the Jean-Louis Calderon price (in the category "video") about his reportage about Afghanistan, broadcast in Envoyé Spécial.

In June 2011, Jacquier received an award in Italy for best international reporting Ilaria Alpi "Tunisia, the revolution in progress".

In May 2012, Jacquier received the award International Journalism and Human Rights given by the Barcelona Human Rights Film Festival. His widow, Caroline Poiron came to receive the award given in hand by Javier Couso, brother of the camara Jose Couso killed in Iraq in 2004 while he was reporting the war.

== See also ==
- List of journalists killed during the Syrian Civil War
