= Al-Qutayfah District =

al-Qutayfah District منطقة القطيفة
- District
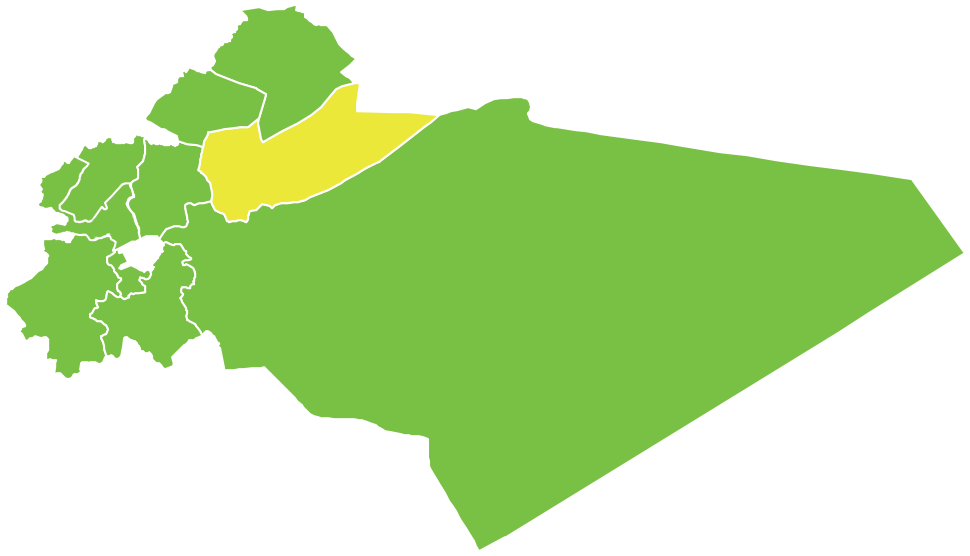
- Map of al-Qutayfah District within Rif Dimashq Governorate
- Coordinates (al-Qutayfah): 33.73°N 36.58°E
- Country: Syria
- Governorate: Rif Dimashq
- Seat: al-Qutayfah
- Subdistricts: 4 nawāḥī

Area
  - Total: 1,587.63 km^{2} (612.99 sq mi)

Population (2004)
  - Total: 119,283
  - Density: 75.1327/km^{2} (194.593/sq mi)
- Geocode: SY0303

al-Qutayfah District (Arabic: منطقة القطيفة, romanized: manṭiqat al-Qutayfah) is a district of the Rif Dimashq Governorate in southern Syria. Administrative centre is the city of al-Qutayfah. At the 2004 census, the district had a population of 119,283.

== Sub-districts ==
The district of al-Qutayfah is divided into four sub-districts or nawāḥī (population as of 2004):

Subdistricts of al-Qutayfah District
Code	Name	Area	Population
SY030300	al-Qutayfah Subdistrict	270.68 km^{2}	44,820
SY030301	Jayroud Subdistrict	382.07 km^{2}	31,821
SY030302	Maaloula Subdistrict	226.06 km^{2}	12,192
SY030303	ar-Ruhaybah Subdistrict	708.82 km^{2}	30,450

== Localities in al-Qutayfah District ==
According to the Central Bureau of Statistics (CBS), the following villages, towns and cities make up the district of Al-Qutayfah:

English Name	Arabic Name	Population	Subdistrict
ar-Ruhaybah	الرحيبة	30,450	ar-Ruhaybah
al-Qutayfah	القطيفة	26,671	al-Qutayfah
Jayroud	جيرود	24,219	Jayroud
Muadamiyat al-Qalamoun	معضمية القلمون	14,228	al-Qutayfah
al-Naseriyah	الناصرية	4,827	Jayroud
Hala	حله	3,921	al-Qutayfah
Jubb'adin	جبعدين	3,778	Maaloula
Ain al-Tinah	عين التينة	3,206	Maaloula
Maaloula	معلولا	2,762	Maaloula
al-Tawani	التواني	2,446	Maaloula
al-Aatanah	العطنة	1,897	Jayroud
al-Mansoura	المنصورة	878	Jayroud
