= Jayrud =

Jairoud جيرود
- Town
- Location within Syria
- Coordinates: 33°48′24″N 36°44′25″E
- Country: Syria
- Governorate: Rif Dimashq
- District: al-Qutayfah
- Subdistrict: Jayroud

Population (2004 census)
  - Total: 24,219
- Time zone: UTC+2 (EET)
  - Summer (DST): UTC+3 (EEST)
- Area code: 11

Jairoud (Arabic: جيرود; also spelled Jerud or Jayroud) is a city in southern Syria, administratively part of the Rif Dimashq Governorate, located northeast of Damascus in the Qalamoun Mountains. Nearby localities include ar-Ruhaybah, al-Qutayfah and Muadamiyat al-Qalamoun to the southwest, Yabroud, an-Nabek and Deir Atiyah to the north and al-Qaryatayn to the northeast. According to the Syria Central Bureau of Statistics, Jairoud had a population of 24,219 in the 2004 census. The city is also the administrative center of the Jairoud nahiyah which consists of four towns and villages with a combined population of 31,821. Its inhabitants are predominantly Sunni Muslims.

== History ==
Excavations at the site produced microliths, blades, scrapers and other lithic tools dating back to the Natufian culture.

During Roman times, Jairoud was known as Geroda. The city is mentioned in the Antonine Itinerary which was written during the reign of Diocletian. In the itinerary the city is one of the stations on the Roman road between Palmyra and Damascus, and is at a distance of 16 Roman miles from Telsea (modern Al-Dumayr).

Jairoud was visited by Syrian geographer Yaqut al-Hamawi in the early 13th century, during Ayyubid rule. He noted that it was "a village of Ma'loula in the Ghautah of Damascus."

Under the Ottomans, the city served as the centre of the Jairoud Nahiyah, and was the seat of a Pasha (Mohammed Aldaas Jairoudi Pasha) and an Agha (Saleem Aldaas Agha) In the 19th century, the city was described as affluent, hospitable and "unusually clean." The city was attacked frequently by Bedouin tribes that live on the edge of the Syrian Desert.

On June 29, 2016, more than 30 people were killed when the Syrian regime bombarded the city. It was said to be the first attack on the opposition held town by the regime after a nearly two year long truce.

== Geography ==
The city lies on the ancient merchant caravan route between Damascus and Palmyra, in the fertile plain of Jairoud on the foothills of the Qalamoun Mountains. The land is well-cultivated and is known for its produce of wheat and barley. The city lies to the western end of a large salt marsh called, "al-Mallahah".

== Bibliography ==
- Akkermans, Peter M. M. G.; Schwartz, Glenn M. (2004). The Archaeology of Syria: From Complex Hunter-Gatherers to Early Urban Societies (c.16,000-300 BC). Cambridge University Press. ISBN 9780521796668.
- Le Strange, G. (1890). Palestine Under the Moslems: A Description of Syria and the Holy Land from A.D. 650 to 1500. London: Committee of the Palestine Exploration Fund. OCLC 1004386.
- Porter, J.L. (1856). "Memoir on the Map of Damascus, Hauran, and the Lebanon Mountains". Journal of the Royal Geographical Society of London. 26. Royal Geographical Society: 43–55. doi:10.2307/1798344. This article incorporates text from this source, which is in the public domain.
- Porter, J.L. (1868). A handbook for travellers in Syria and Palestine. J. Murray. "Jerud syria."
- Robinson, E.; Smith, E. (1841). Biblical Researches in Palestine, Mount Sinai and Arabia Petraea: A Journal of Travels in the year 1838. Vol. 3. Boston: Crocker & Brewster.
