= Flitah =

Flitah فليطة Meshrefah
- Village
- Location in Syria
- Coordinates: 34°1′43″N 36°35′0″E
- Country: Syria
- Governorate: Rif Dimashq
- District: an-Nabek
- Subdistrict: an-Nabek

Population (2004 census)
  - Total: 6,475
- Time zone: UTC+2 (EET)
  - Summer (DST): UTC+3 (EEST)

Flitah or Meshrefah (Arabic: فليطة/مشرفة) is a Syrian village in the An-Nabek District of the Rif Dimashq Governorate. According to the Syria Central Bureau of Statistics (CBS), Flitah had a population of 6,475 in the 2004 census. Its inhabitants are predominantly Sunni Muslims.

== Bibliography ==
- Robinson, E.; Smith, E. (1841). Biblical Researches in Palestine, Mount Sinai and Arabia Petraea: A Journal of Travels in the year 1838. Vol. 3. Boston: Crocker & Brewster.
