= Yabroud District =

Yabroud District منطقة يبرود
- District
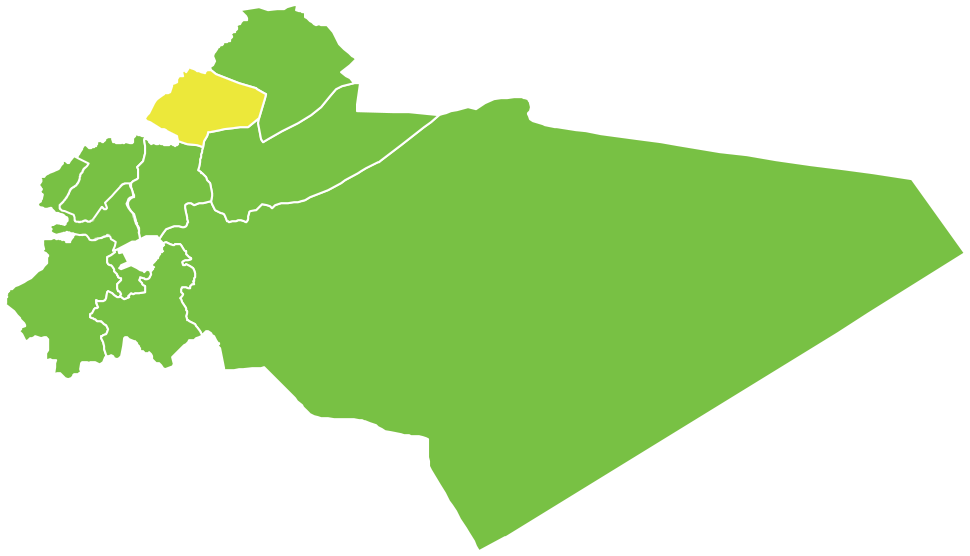
- Map of Yabroud District within Rif Dimashq Governorate
- Coordinates (Yabroud): 34°N 36.7°E
- Country: Syria
- Governorate: Rif Dimashq
- Seat: Yabroud
- Subdistricts: 2 nawāḥī

Area
  - Total: 580.34 km^{2} (224.07 sq mi)

Population (2004)
  - Total: 48,370
  - Density: 83.35/km^{2} (215.9/sq mi)
- Geocode: SY0305

Yabroud District (Arabic: منطقة يبرود, romanized: manṭiqat Yabrūd) is a district of the Rif Dimashq Governorate in southern Syria. Administrative centre is the city of Yabroud. At the 2004 census, the district had a population of 48,370.

== Sub-districts ==
The district of Yabroud is divided into two sub-districts or nawāḥī (population as of 2004):

Subdistricts of Yabroud District
| Code | Name | Area | Population |
|---|---|---|---|
| SY030500 | Yabroud Subdistrict | 321.58 km² | 39,604 |
| SY030501 | Assal al-Ward Subdistrict | 258.76 km² | 8,706 |

== Localities in Yabroud District ==
According to the Central Bureau of Statistics (CBS), the following villages, towns and cities, make up the district of Yabroud:

| English Name | Arabic Name | Population | Subdistrict |
|---|---|---|---|
| Yabroud | يبرود | 25,891 | Yabroud |
| Ras al-Maara | رأس المعرة | 8,520 | Yabroud |
| Assal al-Ward | عسال الورد | 5,812 | Assal al-Ward |
| al-Jebbah | الجبة | 2,829 | Assal al-Ward |
| Ras al-Ayn | رأس العين | 2,754 | Yabroud |
| al-Sarkha (Bakhah) | (الصرخه (بخعة | 1,405 | Yabroud |
| Rima | ريما | 1,034 | Yabroud |
| Wadi an-Naaim | وادي النعيم | 125 | Assal al-Ward |
