= Al-Nabek District =

al-Nabek District منطقة النبك
- District
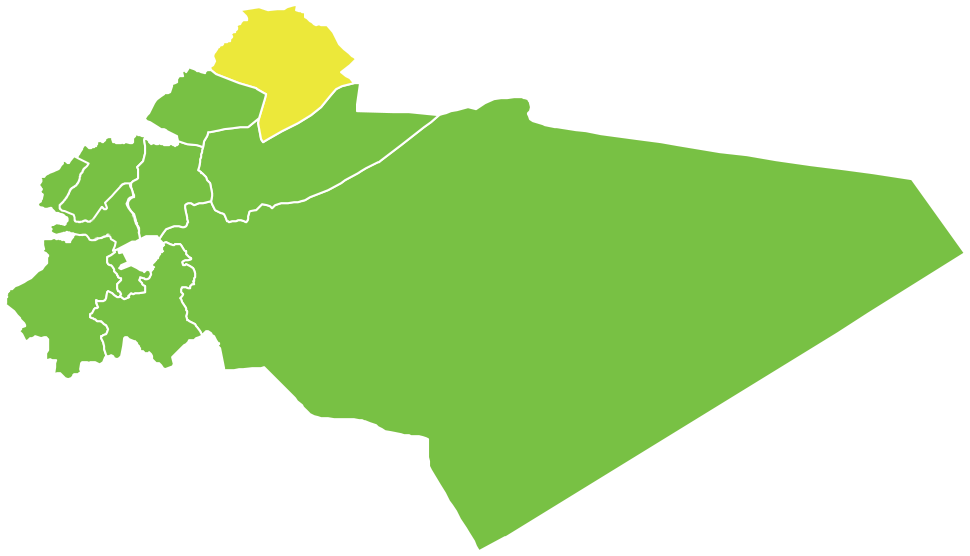
- Map of al-Nabek District within Rif Dimashq Governorate
- Coordinates (al-Nabek): 34.02°N 36.72°E
- Country: Syria
- Governorate: Rif Dimashq
- Seat: al-Nabek
- Subdistricts: 3 nawāḥī

Area
  - Total: 1,122.87 km^{2} (433.54 sq mi)

Population (2004)
  - Total: 80,001
  - Density: 71.247/km^{2} (184.53/sq mi)
- Geocode: SY0306

al-Nabek District (Arabic: منطقة النبك, romanized: manṭiqat an-Nabek) is a district of the Rif Dimashq Governorate in southern Syria. Administrative centre is the city of al-Nabek. At the 2004 census, the district had a population of 80,001.

The area of the district is also known as Qalamoun (also transliterated as Qalamun, Qalamūn, Kalamon and Kalamoun).

== Sub-districts ==
The district of al-Nabek is divided into three sub-districts nawāḥī (population as of 2004):

Subdistricts of al-Nabek District
Code	Name	Area	Population
SY030600	al-Nabek Subdistrict	546.37 km^{2}	50,747
SY030601	Deir Atiyah Subdistrict	km^{2}	15,006
SY030602	Qara Subdistrict	km^{2}	14,248

== Localities in an-Nabek District ==
According to the Central Bureau of Statistics (CBS), the following villages, towns and cities, make up the district of an-Nabek:

English Name	Arabic Name	Population	Subdistrict
al-Nabek	النبك	32,548	al-Nabek
Qara	قارة	12,508	Qara
Deir Atiyah	دير عطية	10,984	Deir Atiyah
Flitah (Meshrefah)	(فليطة (مشرفة	6,475	al-Nabek
al-Sahel	السحل	5,677	al-Nabek
al-Jarajir	الجراجير	4,022	Deir Atiyah
al-Qastal	القسطل	3,486	al-Nabek
Qaldoun al-Marah	قلدون المراح	2,561	al-Nabek
al-Humayra	الحميرة	1,740	Qara
