= Qara, Syria =

City in Syria

Qara قارة Qārā, Kara
- City
- Location in Syria
- Coordinates: 34°09′15″N 36°44′39″E
- Country: Syria
- Governorate: Rif Dimashq
- District: an-Nabek
- Subdistrict: Qara
- Elevation: 1,280 m (4,200 ft)

Population (2004 census)
  - Total: 12,508

Qara or Kara (Arabic: قارة) is a city in the An-Nabek District of the Rif Dimashq Governorate, Syria. It is located between the Qalamoun Mountains and the Eastern Lebanon mountains range, 95 kilometres (59 mi) north of the capital Damascus on the road to the city of Homs. According to the Syria Central Bureau of Statistics (CBS), Qara had a population of 12,508 in the 2004 census. Its inhabitants are mostly Sunni Muslims and Greek Orthodox and Catholic Christians.

== History ==
Its Christian history dates back to the 5th century when, during the Christological controversies of the time, it aligned itself with imperial Chalcedonian Christianity. It is then mentioned in the 11th century as a center of Melkite Christianity. In 1184, Ibn Jubayr and Yaqut reported that the town was entirely Christian, but Sultan Baybars expelled or killed the Christian population during his campaigns against the Crusaders and Mongols.

It was the southernmost town in the Jund Hims military district of the region of Syria during the Umayyad Caliphate. Abu'l-Fida described it in his Geography of 1321 as "a large village half way between Damascus and Homs. It is a waystation for the caravans. Most of its inhabitants are Christians. It lies 1½ marches from Homs and 2 marches from Damascus." Since the 14th century Qara has been eclipsed by an-Nabek its neighbor to the south. It was described as a caravan station located between Damascus and Homs.

The Sufi scholar Abd al-Ghani al-Nabulsi visited Qara in 1690, remarking that the village's houses were "very small", confusing this along with the encountered unfriendliness of the inhabitants as a sign of hostility to outsiders. However, the conditions of Qara were common in villages located in the lawless regions of the Levant at that time. While Qara's population had originally been Christian, by the 17th century it was a mixed Muslim-Christian village.

== See also ==
- Monastery of St. James the Mutilated

== Bibliography ==
- Le Strange, G. (1890). Palestine Under the Moslems: A Description of Syria and the Holy Land from A.D. 650 to 1500. London: Committee of the Palestine Exploration Fund. OCLC 1004386.
- Robinson, E.; Smith, E. (1841). Biblical Researches in Palestine, Mount Sinai and Arabia Petraea: A Journal of Travels in the year 1838. Vol. 3. Boston: Crocker & Brewster.
