= Al-Ruhaybah =

Al-Ruhaybah الرحيبة Al-Ruhaibah
- Location in Syria
- Coordinates: 33°44′36.9″N 36°42′04.2″E
- Country: Syria
- Governorate: Rif Dimashq
- District: al-Qutayfah
- Subdistrict: ar-Ruhaybah

Population (2004 census)
  - Total: 30,450
- Time zone: UTC+2 (EET)
  - Summer (DST): UTC+3 (EEST)

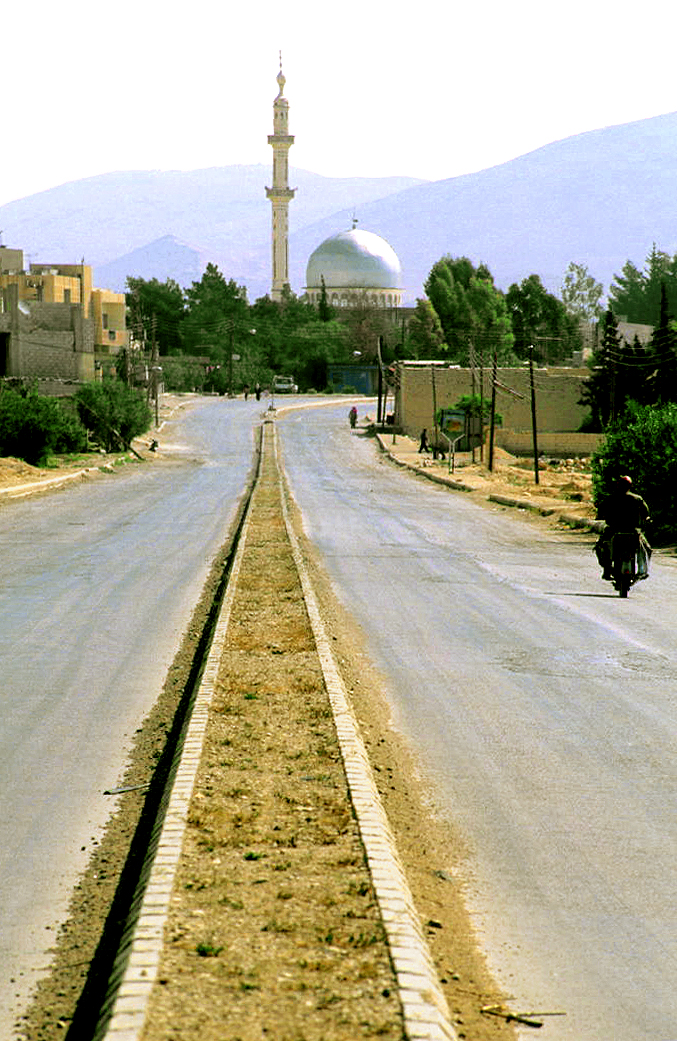
A mosque in Al-Ruhaybah (2001)

Al-Ruhaybah or Al-Ruhaibah (Arabic: الرحيبة) is a Syrian city in the Al-Qutayfah District of the Rif Dimashq Governorate. According to the Syria Central Bureau of Statistics (CBS), Ar-Ruhaybah had a population of 30,450 in the 2004 census. Its inhabitants are predominantly Sunni Muslims.

== Bibliography ==
- Robinson, E.; Smith, E. (1841). Biblical Researches in Palestine, Mount Sinai and Arabia Petraea: A Journal of Travels in the year 1838. Vol. 3. Boston: Crocker & Brewster.
