= Al-Qutayfah =

Al-Qutayfah ٱلْقُطَيْفَة Qutaifa
- City
- Location in Syria
- Coordinates: 33°44′20″N 36°36′00″E
- Country: Syria
- Governorate: Rif Dimashq
- District: al-Qutayfah
- Subdistrict: al-Qutayfah
- Elevation: 940 m (3,080 ft)

Population (2004 census)
  - Total: 26,671
- Time zone: UTC+2 (EET)
  - Summer (DST): +3
- Area code: 011

Al-Qutayfah (Arabic: ٱلْقُطَيْفَة, romanized: al-Quṭayfah) is a city in Syria, administratively belonging to the Rif Dimashq Governorate, capital of the al-Qutayfah District. It is located approximately 40 kilometers (25 mi) east of Damascus. According to the Syria Central Bureau of Statistics (CBS), al-Qutayfah had a population of 26,671 in the 2004 census. Its inhabitants are predominantly Sunni Muslims.

== Bibliography ==
- Robinson, E.; Smith, E. (1841). Biblical Researches in Palestine, Mount Sinai and Arabia Petraea: A Journal of Travels in the year 1838. Vol. 3. Boston: Crocker & Brewster.
