= Al-Nabek =

City in Syria

Al-Nabek النبك An-Nabek, Nabk
- City
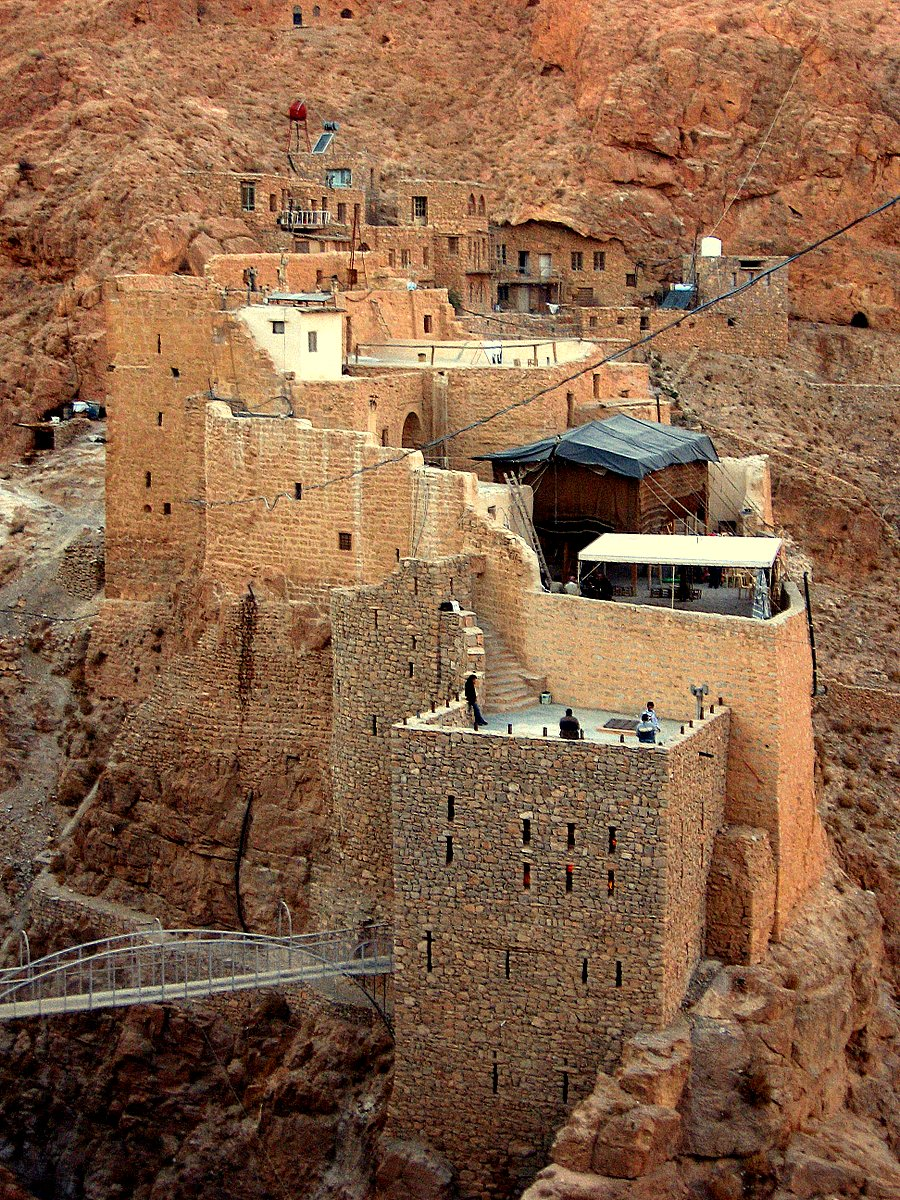
- Monastery of St. Moses the Abyssinian

- Location in Syria
- Coordinates: 34°01′N 36°43′E
- Country: Syria
- Governorate: Rif Dimashq
- District: an-Nabek
- Subdistrict: an-Nabek
- Elevation: 1,255 m (4,117 ft)

Population (2004 census)
  - Total: 32 548
- Time zone: UTC+2 (EET)
  - Summer (DST): +3

Al-Nabek or An-Nabek (Arabic: النبك, romanized: an-Nabk) is a Syrian city administratively belonging to Rif Dimashq and the capital of the Qalamoun. It is located 81 kilometers (50 mi) north of Damascus and south of Homs and has an altitude of 1,255 meters (4,117 ft). According to the Syria Central Bureau of Statistics (CBS), An-Nabek had a population of 32,548 in the 2004 census. The Monastery of St. Moses the Abyssinian (Deir Mar Musa al-Habashi) is located along the Anti-Lebanon Mountains near Nabek and dates back to at least the 6th century.

In the mid-19th century, the population was recorded as consisting mostly of Sunni Muslims, Syriac Catholic and Melkite Catholic Christians. In the mid-1940s, its 6,000 inhabitants were noted to be Sunni Muslims.

== History ==
An-Nabek has been mentioned by Arab geographers from the 12th to 13th centuries CE. Ibn Jubayr recorded that it was a village north of Damascus "with much running water and broad arable fields." Yaqut al-Hamawi wrote in 1225 that "is a fine village with excellent provisions... There is here a curious spring which runs cold in the summer, and with clear, excellent water. They say its source is at Yabroud. It is inhabited chiefly by Muslims." During the Syrian Civil War the town and surrounding area came under the influence of rebel fighters in an area that spilled over into Lebanon. This pocket was later liquidated by Syrian and Hezbollah troops in the Qalamoun offensive (July–August 2017), with many rebel fighters surrendering to government troops.

== Landmarks ==
Deir Mar Musa al-Habashi, the monastery of Monastery of St. Moses the Abyssinian, sits above the town to the east.

== Climate ==
Climate data for Al-Nabek, elevation 1,333 m (4,373 ft)
Month	Jan	Feb	Mar	Apr	May	Jun	Jul	Aug	Sep	Oct	Nov	Dec	Year
Mean daily maximum °C (°F)	7.9 (46.2)	9.5 (49.1)	13.1 (55.6)	17.7 (63.9)	22.7 (72.9)	27.8 (82.0)	30.2 (86.4)	30.6 (87.1)	26.3 (79.3)	21.5 (70.7)	15.0 (59.0)	10.6 (51.1)	19.4 (66.9)
Daily mean °C (°F)	3.0 (37.4)	4.1 (39.4)	7.0 (44.6)	11.3 (52.3)	15.5 (59.9)	20.2 (68.4)	22.2 (72.0)	22.2 (72.0)	18.3 (64.9)	14.3 (57.7)	9.1 (48.4)	5.3 (41.5)	12.7 (54.9)
Mean daily minimum °C (°F)	−1.2 (29.8)	−0.7 (30.7)	1.2 (34.2)	4.5 (40.1)	8.1 (46.6)	12.0 (53.6)	13.8 (56.8)	14.3 (57.7)	11.1 (52.0)	8.0 (46.4)	4.1 (39.4)	1.0 (33.8)	6.3 (43.4)
Average precipitation mm (inches)	26 (1.0)	21 (0.8)	13 (0.5)	16 (0.6)	11 (0.4)	1 (0.0)	0 (0)	0 (0)	2 (0.1)	12 (0.5)	18 (0.7)	24 (0.9)	144 (5.5)
Source: FAO

== Bibliography ==
- Le Strange, G. (1890). Palestine Under the Moslems: A Description of Syria and the Holy Land from A.D. 650 to 1500. London: Committee of the Palestine Exploration Fund. OCLC 1004386.
- Robinson, E.; Smith, E. (1841). Biblical Researches in Palestine, Mount Sinai and Arabia Petraea: A Journal of Travels in the year 1838. Vol. 3. Boston: Crocker & Brewster.
