= Rif Dimashq Governorate =

Rif Dimashq Governorate مُحافظة ريف دمشق
- Governorate
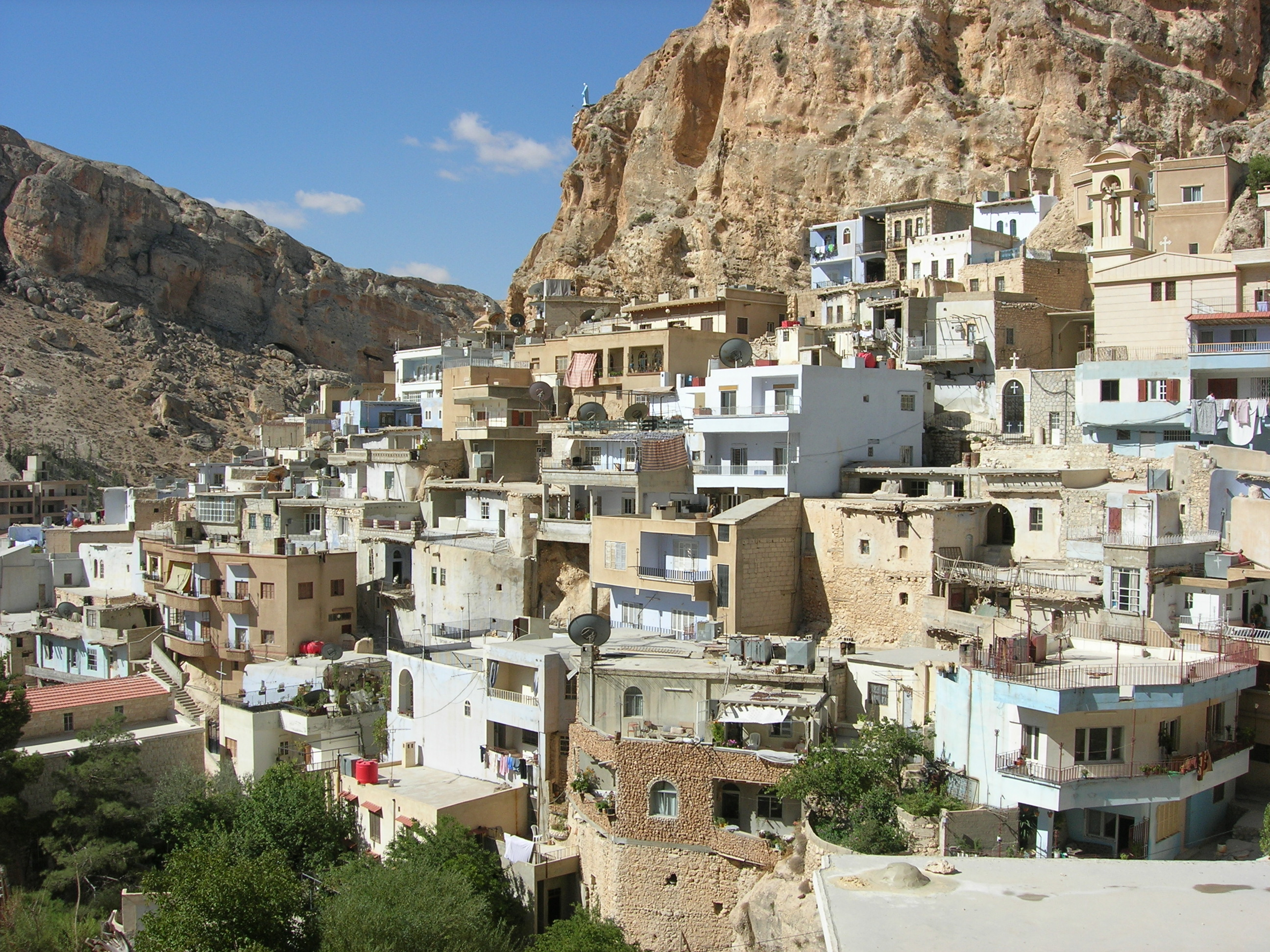
- View over Maaloula

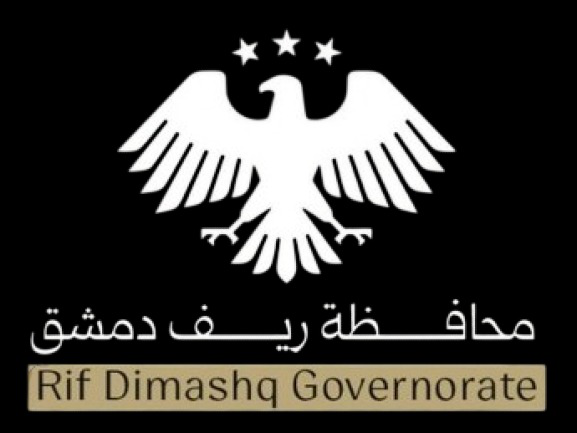
- Seal

- Map of Syria with Rif Dimashq Governorate highlighted
- Interactive map of Rif Dimashq Governorate
- Coordinates (Damascus): 33.5°N 37°E
- Country: Syria
- Capital: Damascus
- Manatiq (Districts): 10

Government
  - Governor: Amer al-Sheikh
  - Commander of Internal Security in Rif Dimashq: Ahmed al-Dalati
  - Director of the Rif Dimashq Security Directorate: Hussam al-Tahhan

Area
  - Total: 26,258.55 km^{2} (10,138.48 sq mi)

Population (2011)
  - Total: 2,836,000
  - Density: 108.0/km^{2} (279.7/sq mi)
- Time zone: UTC+3 (AST)
- ISO 3166 code: SY-RD
- Main language(s): Arabic
- Website: rif-dimashq.gov.sy

Rif Dimashq Governorate (Arabic: محافظة ريف دمشق, romanized: Muḥāfaẓat Rīf Dimašq, lit. 'Damascus Countryside') is one of the fourteen governorates (provinces) of Syria. It is situated in the southwestern part of the country. It borders the governorates of Quneitra, Daraa and Suwayda in the southwest, Homs in the north, Lebanon in the west and Jordan in the south. The capital is the city of Damascus.

The Governorate completely surrounds the city and governorate of Damascus and it has an area of 18,032 km² and a population of 2,273,074 (2004 census).

The Governorate was a major site of fighting in the Syrian civil war in the Rif Dimashq Governorate campaign.

In January 2023, after rumors in social media that Douma have been renamed Al-Fayhaa and became the capital of Rif Dimashq Governorate, Ibrahim Jumaa, head of Rif Dimashq Governorate Council, said that such move should be taken by presidential decret. He said that Al-Fayhaa will be the new name of the ensemble composed by Douma and Harasta, which will be named Al-Fayhaa, and a new building is under construction in Harasta to serve as governorate headquarters, which will be finished by two years.

== Districts ==
Districts of Rif Dimashq in four colours

The governorate is divided into ten districts (manatiq). The districts are further divided into 37 sub-districts (nawahi). There were nine districts until February 2009, when Qudsaya District was created from parts of Markaz Rif Dimashq and Al-Zabadani districts. There is a small village belonging to the Damascus countryside (Ghouta) called Aqraba, which is characterized by its fields and agricultural orchards (nawahi). The governorate's total population (as of the 2004 census) is 2,273,074.

- Markaz Rif Dimashq District (6 sub-districts; population: 837,804)
  - Al-Kiswah Subdistrict
  - Babbila Subdistrict
  - Jaramana Subdistrict
  - Al-Malihah Subdistrict
  - Kafr Batna Subdistrict
  - Arbin Subdistrict
- Darayya District (3 sub-districts; population: 260,961)
  - Darayya Subdistrict
  - Sahnaya Subdistrict
  - al-Hajar al-Aswad Subdistrict
- Douma District (7 sub-districts; population: 433,719)
  - Douma Subdistrict
  - Harasta Subdistrict
  - Sabaa Biyar Subdistrict
  - Al-Dumayr Subdistrict
  - Al-Nashabiyah Subdistrict
  - Al-Ghizlaniyah Subdistrict
  - Harran al-Awamid Subdistrict
- Al-Nabek District (3 sub-districts; population: 80,001)
  - Al-Nabek Subdistrict
  - Deir Atiyah Subdistrict
  - Qara Subdistrict
- Qatana District (3 sub-districts; population: 207,245)
  - Qatana Subdistrict
  - Beit Jinn Subdistrict
  - Sa'sa' Subdistrict
- Qudsaya District (3 sub-districts; population: 105,974)^{*}
  - Qudsaya Subdistrict
  - Al-Dimas Subdistrict
  - Ain al-Fijah Subdistrict
- Al-Qutayfah District (4 sub-districts; population: 119,283)
  - Al-Qutayfah Subdistrict
  - Jayrud Subdistrict
  - Maaloula Subdistrict
  - Al-Ruhaybah Subdistrict
- Al-Tall District (3 sub-districts; population: 115,937)
  - al-Tall Subdistrict
  - Saidnaya Subdistrict
  - Rankous Subdistrict
- Yabroud District (2 sub-districts; population: 48,370)
  - Yabroud Subdistrict
  - Assal al-Ward Subdistrict
- Al-Zabadani District (3 sub-districts; population: 63,780)
  - Al-Zabadani Subdistrict
  - Madaya Subdistrict
  - Serghaya Subdistrict

^{*}a newly-created district since 2009, formerly belonging to Markaz Rif Dimashq District and parts of Al-Zabadani District

=== Historical districts ===
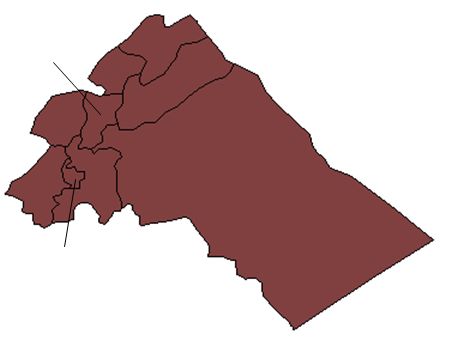

== Demographics ==
Religious composition of Rif Dimashq Governorate (2011)
Sunnis	87%
Christians	5%
Alawites	4%
Druze	4%
Shias	0.9%
Ismailis	0.1%

At the end of 2011, the population of Rif Dimashq reached 2,836,000, accounting for 13% of Syria’s population. Sunni Muslims made up 87% of the governorate, while Christians made up 5%, Alawites made up 4%, Druze made up 4%, Twelver Shia Muslims made up 0.9%, and Ismaili Muslims made up 0.1%.
