= Aramaic square script =

Consonantal alphabet script

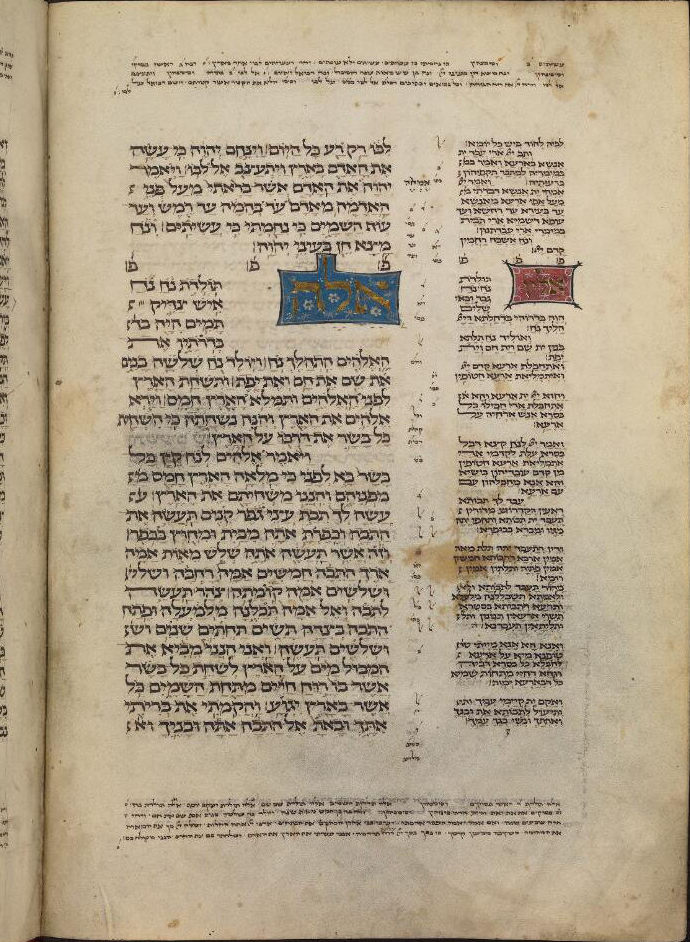
Page from the Kennicott Bible with Onkelos (Aramaic language translation), Hebrew language on the left, Aramaic on the right

Aramaic square script is the 22-letter consonantal alphabet script, or an abjad, that developed during the rule of the Achaemenid empire to write the Aramaic language. It is loosely called "square" because its letters can be fit into the shape of a square (rather than rectangle, etc).

The earliest known examples of square script are the Elephantine Papyri and Ostraca, a cache of Jewish and non-Jewish documents from the 5th to 4th centuries BCE. By the first centuries CE, Jews had begun to use square script or "ktav Ashuri" (Assyrian script) for all purposes, in both Hebrew and Aramaic. It is still the main script used for Modern Hebrew and other Jewish languages, and also survives in the square Maalouli alphabet used for Western Neo-Aramaic.

== Background ==
The Neo-Assyrian empire adopted use of the Aramaic language and early Aramaic script alongside their native Akkadian language after conquering the Aramaean city-states and kingdoms in the 9th and 8th centuries BC. The (non-square) script then used was simpler than their own cuneiform script, and first adopted in the provinces where Aramaic was widely spoken and then eventually in Assyria itself. Aramaic "square script", so called because the letters fit into the shape of a square, is first known from the Elephantine papyri.

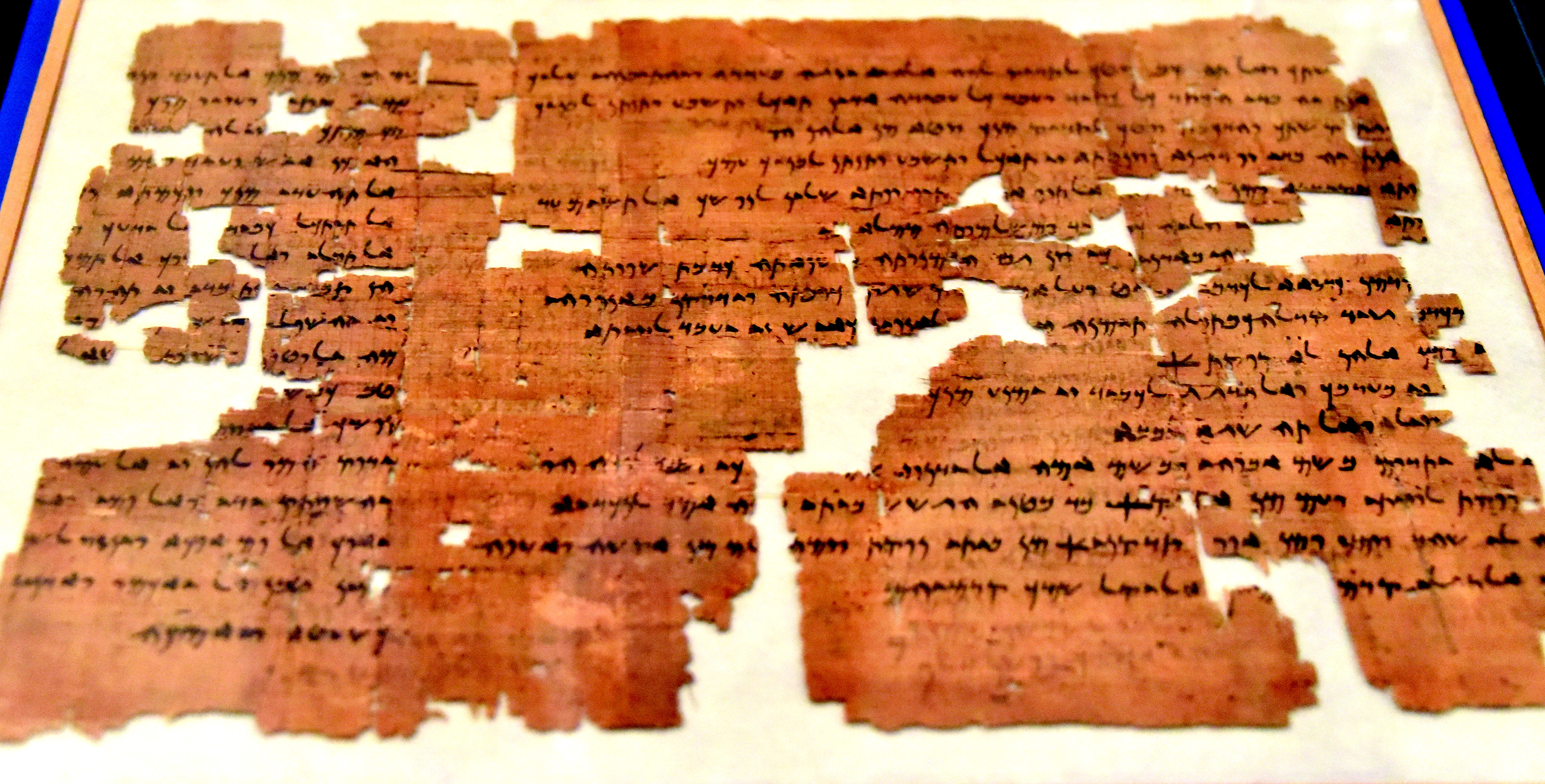
Papyrus narrating the story of the wise chancellor Ahiqar. Aramaic script. 5th century BCE. From Elephantine, Egypt. Neues Museum, Berlin

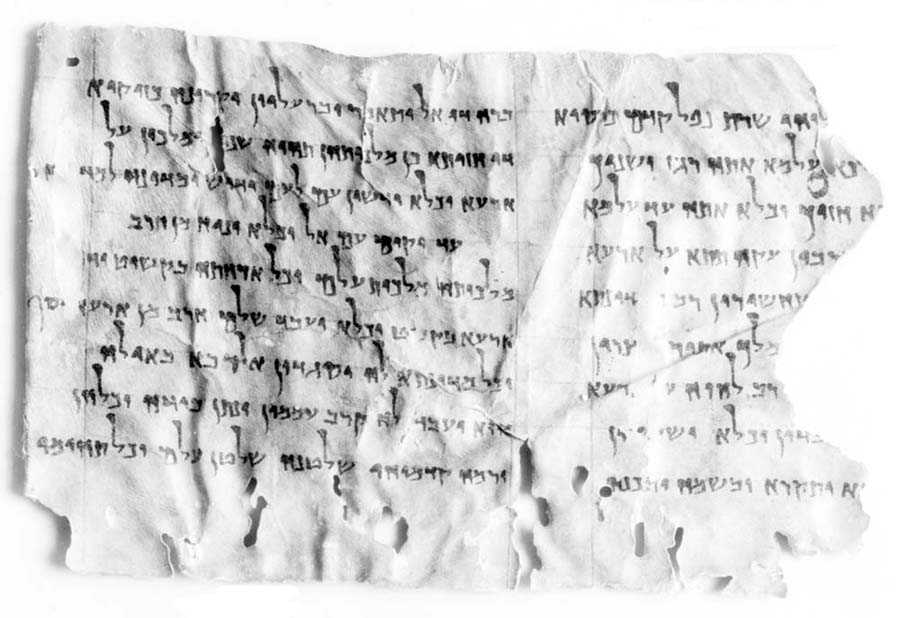
Son of God manuscript, one of the Qumran scrolls written in Jewish Palestinian Aramaic using square script

The Hebrew Bible was originally written using the Phoenician alphabet script (also known as Paleo-Hebrew). Possibly as early as the late Persian or the Hellenistic Period, Jewish scribes began using square script to write Hebrew, and this practice was in widespread use by the 3rd century BCE. Some scholars attribute this shift to the influence of the Babylonian exile where Aramaic was also the language of daily life.

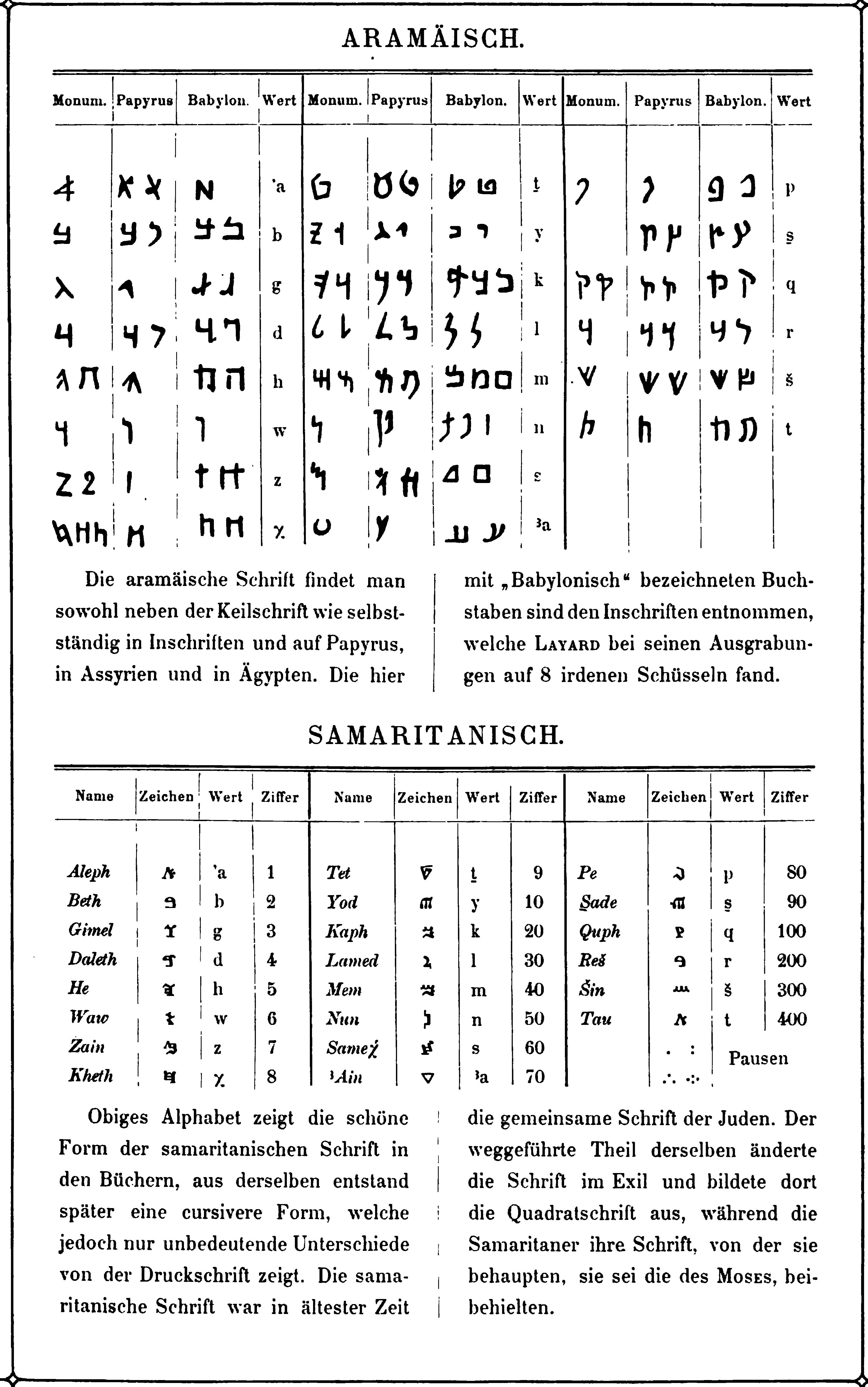
Aramaic alphabet scripts charted at top, Samaritan alphabet at bottom

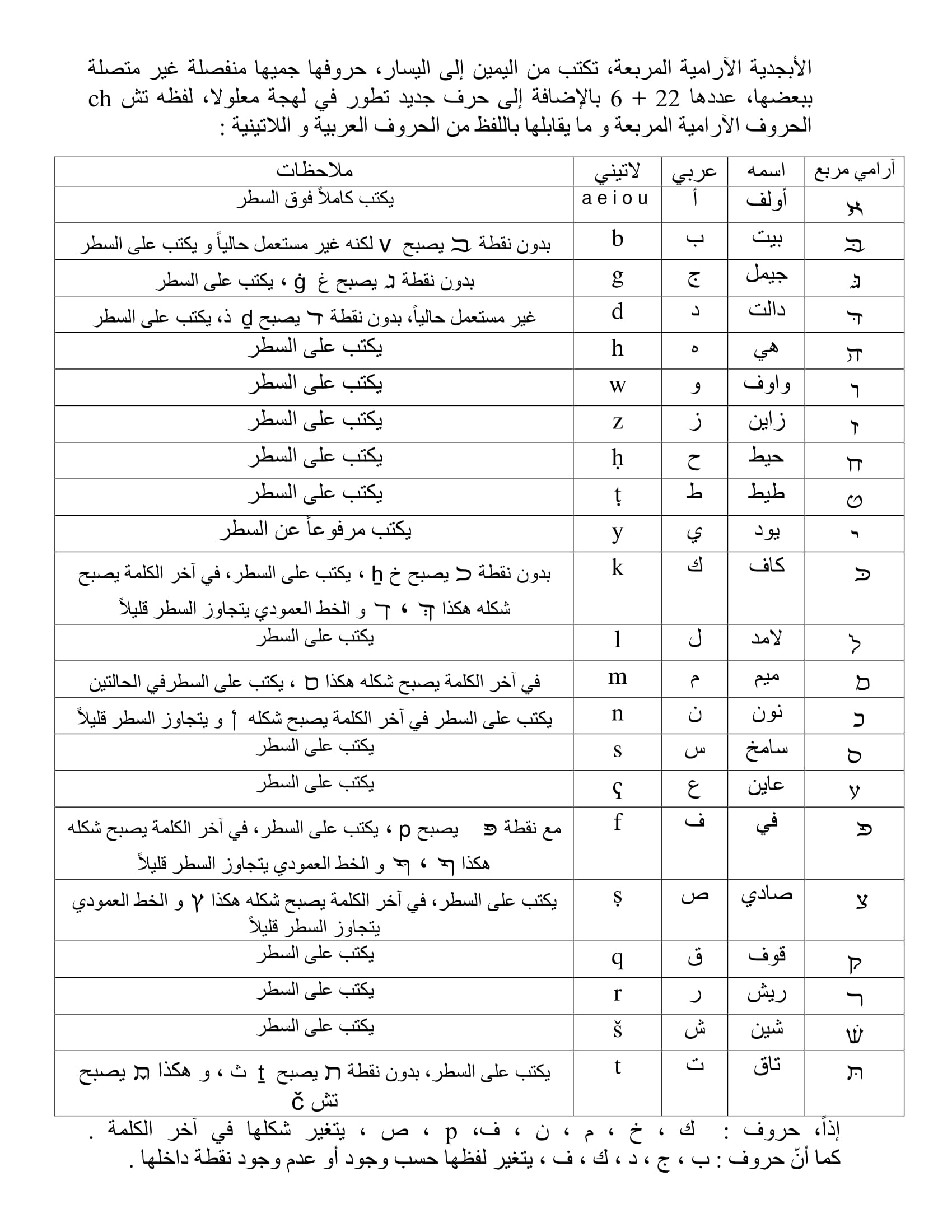
Western Neo-Aramaic Square alphabet chart with its Arabic alphabet letter equivalents

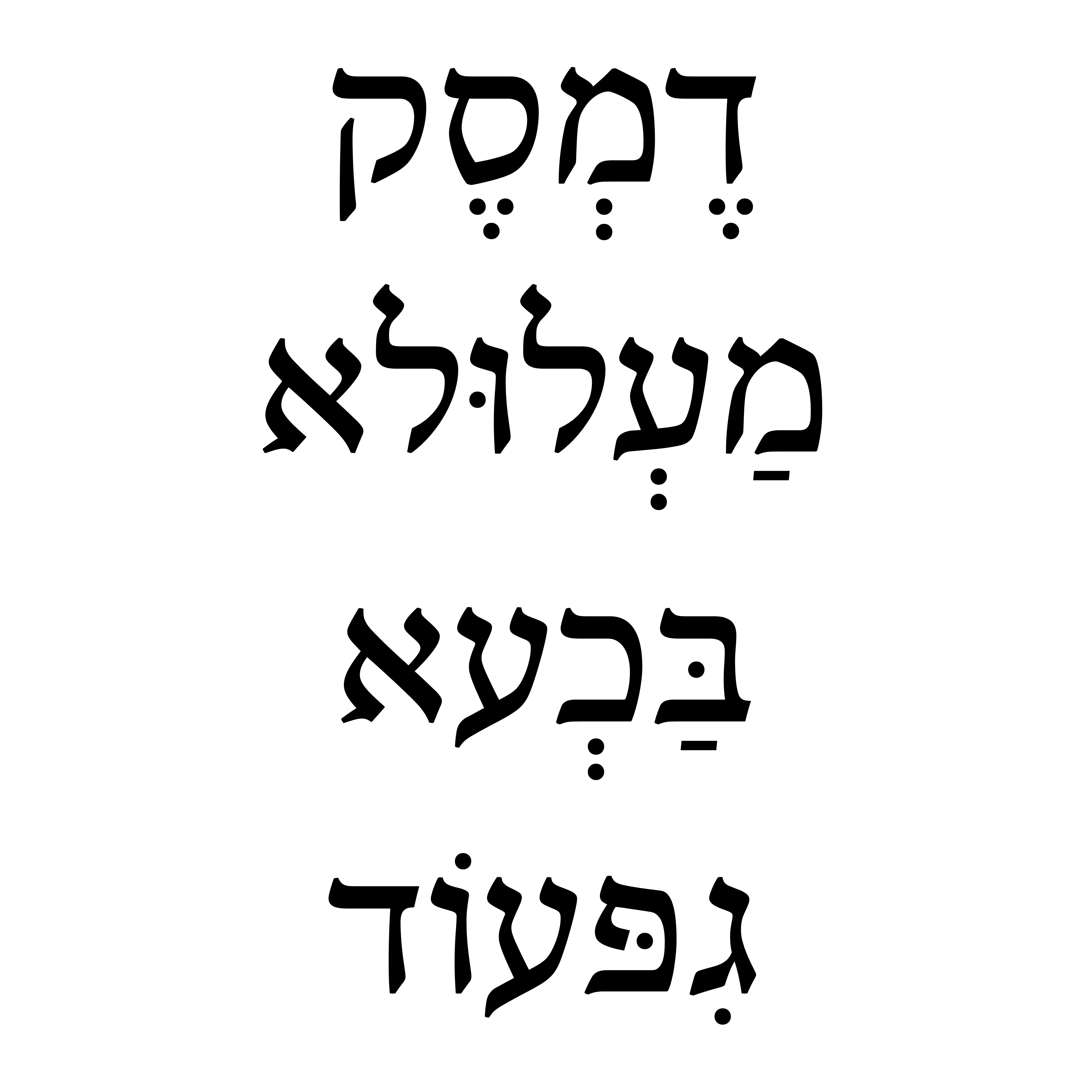
"Damascus", the capital of Syria written in Western neo-Aramaic square script at top, followed by the names of Syrian towns that continue to speak and write Western neo-Aramaic dialects: Maaloula, Al-Sarkha (Bakhah), and Jubb'adin

The Talmud refers to square script as k'tav ashuri ("Assyrian script"), distinguishing it from Phoenician/Paleo-Hebrew script Ktav 'Ivri ("Hebrew script").

Today, only the Samaritans continue to use a form of Phoenician/Paleo-Hebrew for their written language.

== Texts ==
Study of the early development of the square Aramaic script (and its Hebrew counterpart), is important to categorizing, analyzing and dating the many thousands of Aramaic and Hebrew inscriptions made in the Middle Aramaic period, including those of the Dead Sea Scrolls. There is a great deal of debate among paleographists over the terminology and typologies to be used in classifying the various texts that is complicated by the lack of definitively dated texts outside of this corpus from the late Hellenistic to early Roman periods.

Almost all of the Dead Sea Scrolls are written in square script, including both Hebrew and Aramaic texts. However, several Hebrew manuscripts use Paleo-Hebrew for the Tetragrammaton, and one Aramaic manuscript (4Q243) uses Paleo-Hebrew for "Elohekha".

Jewish Babylonian Aramaic and Mandaic differ only in script: Jewish Babylonian Aramaic uses square script.

Immanuel Tremellius' 16th-century edition of the Peshitta used square script, as did Chaim Heller's 1927-1929 edition.

=== Magic bowl inscriptions ===
Square script was used to inscribe incantation bowls in various languages, and while many of these clearly reflect a Jewish religious or cultural milieu, there are several that do not. Some are written in an Aramaic koine language with in some cases a Mandaic context and prototype. Several others use Aramaic square script for expression in Standard Literary Babylonian Aramaic, and display remarkable syncretism, with closing formula banning "the evil elements in the name of your God Sadday, YHWH, Jesus, Ruha Qaddista". Ruha Qaddista is a feminized form for the Holy Spirit, reflecting the early Eastern churches transmission of Mesopotamian legacies which used qadistu as an epitaph of the goddess Ishtar.

== Cursive counterparts ==
Several other alphabets were born out of Imperial Aramaic that resemble the Aramaic square script, yet exhibit differences in the letter shapes tending towards being more rounded or cursive. Among these are Hatran Aramaic, Palmyrene Aramaic and Nabataean Aramaic.

== Bibliography ==
- Akopian, Arman (2017). Introduction to Aramean and Syriac Studies: A manual.
- Bae, Chul-hyun (2004). "Aramaic as a Lingua Franca During the Persian Empire (538-333 B.C.E.)". Journal of Universal Language. 5: 1–20. doi:10.22425/jul.2004.5.1.1.
- Berlin, Adele; Brettler, Marc Zvi (2004). The Jewish Study Bible. Oxford University Press. ISBN 978-0-19-529751-5.
- Collins, John J. (2002). "Current Issues in the Study of Daniel". In Collins, John J.; Flint, Peter W.; VanEpps, Cameron (eds.). The Book of Daniel: Composition and Reception. BRILL. ISBN 978-90-04-11675-7.
- Byrne, R. (2005). "Asia, Ancient Southwest: Middle Aramaic Scripts". Encyclopedia of Language and Linguistics. Elsevier Science. ISBN 978-0-08-054784-8.
- Di Segni, Leah (2022). An Introduction to Late Antique Epigraphy in the Holy Land. Edizioni Terra Santa. ISBN 979-12-5471-118-7.
- Müller-Kessler, Christa (2012). "More on puzzling words and spellings in Aramaic incantation bowls and related texts". Bulletin of the School of Oriental and African Studies. 75 (1): 1–31. doi:10.1017/S0041977X1100084X. JSTOR 23258892.
- Mansoor, Menahem (1978). Biblical Hebrew Step by Step: Volume 1. Baker Publishing. ISBN 978-0-8010-6041-0.
- Mitchell, T. C. (1988). Biblical Archaeology: Documents for the British Museum. Cambridge University Press. ISBN 978-0-521-36867-4.
- Meyer, Anthony R. "Chapter Five: Aramaic Dead Sea Scrolls". Naming God in Early Judaism. Brill. pp. 90–129.
- Müller-Kessler, Christa (April–June 2005). "Review: Of Jesus, Darius, Marduk...: Aramaic Magic Bowls in the Moussaieff Collection - Reviewed Work: A Corpus of Magic Bowls: Incantation Texts in Jewish Aramaic from Late Antiquity by Dan Levene". Journal of the American Oriental Society. 125 (2): 219-240. JSTOR 20064328.
- Longacre, Drew (2017). "4.1.3.2.1 Hebrew and Aramaic Palaeography". Textual History of the Bible, Vol. 3.
- Newsom, Carol Ann; Brettler, Marc Zvi; Coogan, Michael David; Perkins, Pheme (2018). The New Oxford Annotated Bible: New Revised Standard Version with the Apocrypha: an Ecumenical Study Bible. Oxford University Press. ISBN 978-0-19-027609-6.
- Reeves, John C. (2000). "Giants, Book of the". In Lawrence H. Schiffman & James C. VanderKam (ed.). Encyclopaedia of the Dead Sea Scrolls (Volume 1). Oxford University Press, 2000. pp. 309–311.
- Tov, Emmanuel (2025). "Scribal Habits of the Aramaic Qumran Texts". Textus. 34 (1): 1–14. doi:10.1163/2589255X-bja10047.
- Vanderhooft, David S. (2021). "Chapter 4: Aramaic, Paleo-Hebrew and "Jewish" scripts in the Ptolemaic Period". In Nihan, Christophe; Lipschits, Oded; Honigman, Sylvie (eds.). Times of Transition: Judea in the Early Hellenistic Period. Penn State University Press.
- Van De Water, Rick (June 2000). "Reconsidering Palaeographic and Radiocarbon Dating of the Dead Sea Scrolls". Revue de Qumrân. 19 (3 (75)): 423–439. JSTOR 24663113.
