= Western Aramaic languages =

Group of Aramaic dialects from the Levant

Western Aramaic
- Geographic distribution: Levant (western & southern Syria, Lebanon, Israel, Palestine, Transjordan, Sinai)
- Linguistic classification: Afro-Asiatic: Semitic; West Semitic; Central Semitic; Northwest Semitic; Aramaic; Western Aramaic
- Subdivisions: Orontes Aramaic †; Lebanese Aramaic †; Damascene Aramaic • Western Neo-Aramaic; Palmyrene Aramaic † (Note: The Palmyrene dialect has a dual affiliation because it combines features of both Western and Eastern Aramaic, but it is somewhat closer to the Eastern branch.); Palestinian Aramaic † • Jewish • Samaritan • Galilean • Pagan • Christian; Perean Aramaic † (Note: Also known as East Jordanian Aramaic or Transjordan Aramaic.) • Jewish • Pagan • Christian; Iturean Aramaic? †; Nabataean Aramaic †

Language codes
- Glottolog: west2815

Western Aramaic is a group of Aramaic dialects once spoken widely throughout the ancient Levant, predominantly in the south, and Sinai, including ancient Damascus, Nabataea, across the Palestine region with Judea, Transjordan and Samaria, as well as today's Lebanon and the basins of the Orontes as far as Aleppo in the north. The group was divided into several regional variants, spoken mainly by the Palmyrenes in the east and the Aramaeans who settled on Mount Lebanon - ancestors of the early Maronites. In the south, it was spoken by Judeans (early Jews), Galileans, Samaritans, Canaanites, Melkites (descendants of the aforementioned peoples who followed Chalcedonian Christianity), Nabataeans and possibly the Itureans. All of the Western Aramaic dialects are considered extinct today, except for the modern variety known as Western Neo-Aramaic. This dialect, which descends from Damascene Aramaic, is still spoken by the Arameans (Syriacs) in the towns of Maaloula, Bakh'a and Jubb'adin near Damascus, Syria.

== History ==
A Western Aramaic text, written in Christian Palestinian Aramaic, utilizing a modified version of the Syriac alphabet.

During the Late Middle Aramaic period, spanning from 300 B.C.E. to 200 C.E., Aramaic diverged into its eastern and western branches.

In the middle of the fifth century, Theodoret of Cyrus (d. c. 466) noted that Aramaic, commonly labeled by Greeks as "Syrian" or "Syriac", was widely spoken. He also stated that "the Osroënians, the Syrians, the people of the Euphrates, the Palestinians, and the Phoenicians all speak Syriac, but with many differences in pronunciation", thus recording the regional diversity of Eastern and Western Aramaic dialects during the late antiquity.

Following the early Muslim conquests in the seventh century and the consequent cultural and linguistic Arabization of the Levant and Mesopotamia, Arabic gradually replaced Aramaic, including its Western varieties, as the primary language for most people.

Despite this, Western Aramaic appears to have survived for a relatively long time, at least in some secluded villages in the mountains of Lebanon and in the Anti-Lebanon Mountains in Syria. In fact, up until the 17th century, travelers in the Lebanon region still reported villages where Aramaic was spoken.

== Present ==
Modern state of Neo-Aramaic languages, showing the remaining enclave of Western Neo-Aramaic (in green color)

Today, Western Neo-Aramaic is the sole surviving remnant of the entire western branch of the Aramaic language, spoken by no more than a few thousand people in the Anti-Lebanon mountains of Syria, mainly in Maaloula and Jubb'adin. Until the Syrian Civil War, it was also spoken in Bakhʽa, which was completely destroyed during the war, and all the survivors fled to other parts of Syria or to Lebanon. Their populations of these areas avoided cultural and linguistic Arabization due to the remote, mountainous locations of their isolated villages.

== See also ==
- Aramaic studies
- Bible translations into Aramaic
- Western Neo-Aramaic

== Sources ==
- Arnold, Werner (2000). "The Arabic dialects in the Turkish province of Hatay and the Aramaic dialects in the Syrian mountains of Qalamûn: Two minority languages compared". Arabic as a Minority Language. Berlin-New York: Walter de Gruyter. pp. 347–370. ISBN 978-3-11-016578-4.
- Arnold, Werner (2008). "The Roots qrṭ and qrṣ in Western Neo-Aramaic". Aramaic in Its Historical and Linguistic Setting. Wiesbaden: Harrassowitz Verlag. pp. 305–311. ISBN 978-3-447-05787-5.
- Arnold, Werner (2012). "Western Neo-Aramaic". The Semitic Languages: An International Handbook. Berlin-Boston: Walter de Gruyter. pp. 685–696. ISBN 978-3-11-025158-6.
- Beyer, Klaus (1986). The Aramaic Language: Its Distribution and Subdivisions. Göttingen: Vandenhoeck und Ruprecht. ISBN 978-3-525-53573-8.
- Brock, Sebastian P. (1971). "A Fragment of the Acta Pilati in Christian Palestinian Aramaic". The Journal of Theological Studies. 22 (1): 157–159. doi:10.1093/jts/XXII.I.157. JSTOR 23962351.
- Brock, Sebastian P. (1989). "Three Thousand Years of Aramaic Literature". ARAM Periodical. 1 (1): 11–23.
- Brock, Sebastian P. (1994). "Greek and Syriac in Late Antique Syria". Literacy and Power in the Ancient World. Cambridge: Cambridge University Press. pp. 149–160, 234–235. ISBN 978-0-521-58736-5.
- Creason, Stuart (2008). "Aramaic" (PDF). The Ancient Languages of Syria-Palestine and Arabia. Cambridge: Cambridge University Press. pp. 108–144.
- Gzella, Holger (2015). A Cultural History of Aramaic: From the Beginnings to the Advent of Islam. Leiden-Boston: Brill. ISBN 978-90-04-28510-1.
- Griffith, Sidney H. (1997). "From Aramaic to Arabic: The Languages of the Monasteries of Palestine in the Byzantine and Early Islamic Periods". Dumbarton Oaks Papers. 51: 11–31. doi:10.2307/1291760. JSTOR 1291760.
- Joosten, Jan (1991). "West Aramaic Elements in the Old Syriac and Peshitta Gospels". Journal of Biblical Literature. 110 (2): 271–289. doi:10.2307/3267086. JSTOR 3267086.
- Joosten, Jan (1992). "Two West Aramaic Elements in the Old Syriac and Peshitta Gospels". Biblische Notizen. 61: 17–21.
- Joosten, Jan (1994). "West Aramaic Elements in the Syriac Gospels: Methodological Considerations". VI Symposium Syriacum 1992. Roma: Pontificium institutum studiorum orientalium. pp. 101–109. ISBN 978-88-7210-305-0.
- Kim, Ronald (2008). "Stammbaum or Continuum? The Subgrouping of Modern Aramaic Dialects Reconsidered". Journal of the American Oriental Society. 128 (3): 505–531.
- Mengozzi, Alessandro (2011). "Neo-Aramaic Studies: A Survey of Recent Publications". Folia Orientalia. 48: 233–265.
- Morgenstern, Matthew (2012). "Christian Palestinian Aramaic". The Semitic Languages: An International Handbook. Berlin-Boston: Walter de Gruyter. pp. 628–637. ISBN 978-3-11-025158-6.
- Petruccione, John F.; Hill, Robert C., eds. (2007). Theodoret of Cyrus: The Questions on the Octateuch. Vol. 2. Washington: COA Press. ISBN 978-0-8132-1499-3.
- Rubin, Rehav (2003). "Greek and Syrian Anchorites in the Laura of St. Firmin". ARAM Periodical. 15 (1–2): 81–96. doi:10.2143/ARAM.15.0.504527.
- Sokoloff, Michael (1990). A Dictionary of Jewish Palestinian Aramaic of the Byzantine Period. Ramat Gan: Bar Ilan University Press. ISBN 978-965-226-101-4.
- Sokoloff, Michael (2003). A Dictionary of Judean Aramaic. Ramat Gan: Bar Ilan University Press. ISBN 978-965-226-261-5.
- Sokoloff, Michael (2012). "Jewish Palestinian Aramaic". The Semitic Languages: An International Handbook. Berlin-Boston: Walter de Gruyter. pp. 610–619. ISBN 978-3-11-025158-6.
- Sokoloff, Michael (2014). A dictionary of Christian Palestinian Aramaic. Leuven: Peeters.
- Stevenson, William B. (1924). Grammar of Palestinian Jewish Aramaic. Oxford: Clarendon Press. ISBN 978-1-7252-0617-5.
- Tal, Abraham (2012). "Samaritan Aramaic". The Semitic Languages: An International Handbook. Berlin-Boston: Walter de Gruyter. pp. 619–628. ISBN 978-3-11-025158-6.
- Taylor, David G. K. (2002). "Bilingualism and Diglossia in Late Antique Syria and Mesopotamia". Bilingualism in Ancient Society: Language Contact and the Written Word. Oxford: Oxford University Press. pp. 298–331. ISBN 978-90-04-26441-0.
- Wardini, Elie (2012). "Some aspects of Aramaic as attested in Lebanese place names". Orientalia Suecana. 61: 21–29.
- Weninger, Stefan (2012). "Aramaic-Arabic Language Contact". The Semitic Languages: An International Handbook. Berlin-Boston: Walter de Gruyter. pp. 747–755. ISBN 978-3-11-025158-6.
- Yildiz, Efrem (2000). "The Aramaic Language and Its Classification". Journal of Assyrian Academic Studies. 14 (1): 23–44.
