= Levant =

Region in the Eastern Mediterranean

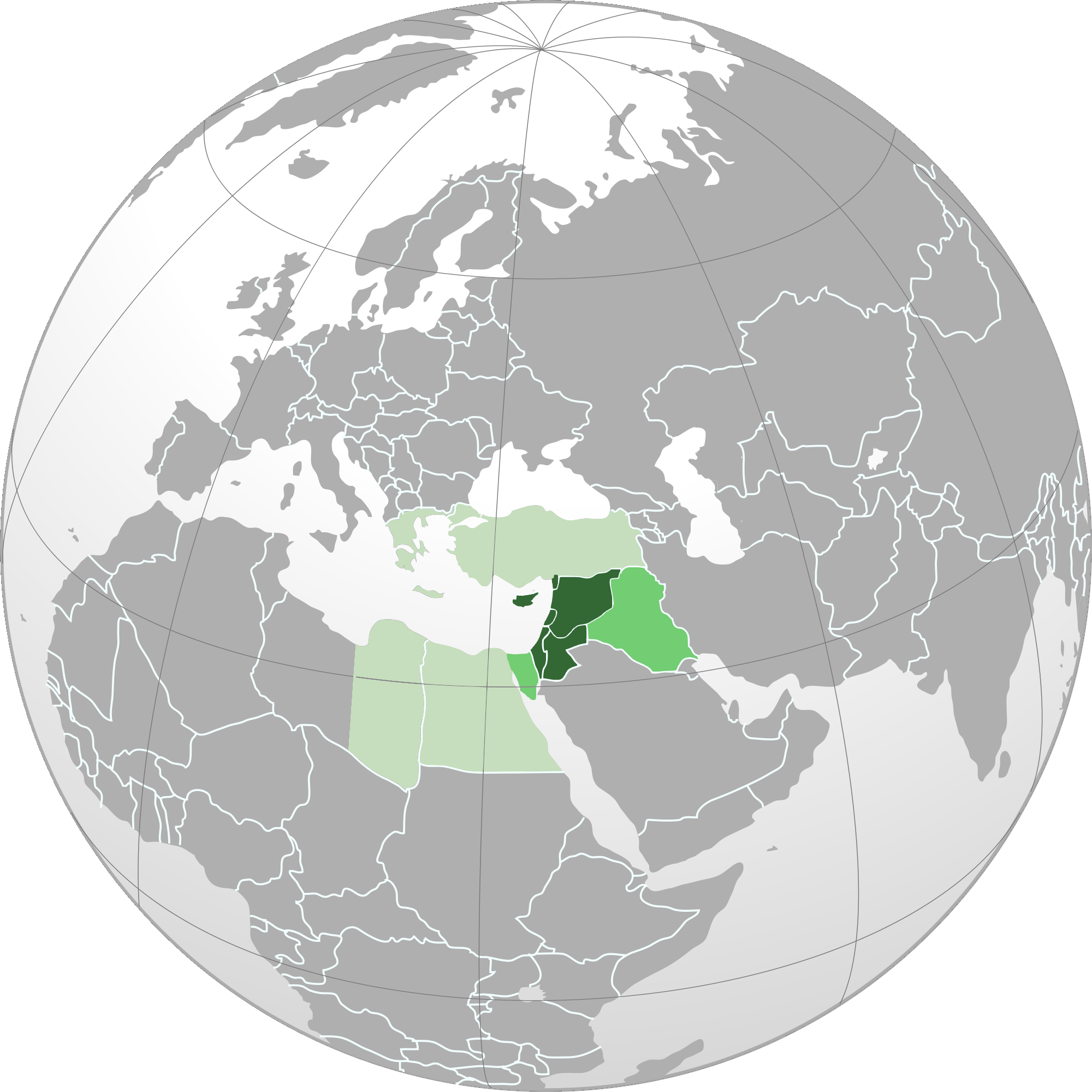
- Countries and regions of the Levant in its broad, historical meaning (equivalent to the Eastern Mediterranean) Countries of the Levant in 20th-century usage Countries and regions sometimes included in 21st-century usage
- Countries and regions: Narrow definition: Akrotiri and Dhekelia; Cyprus; (Turkey) Hatay Province; Israel; Jordan; Lebanon; Palestine; Syria; Broad definition: Egypt; Greece; Iraq; Libya; Turkey
- Population: Narrow definition: 57,681,876 (Note: Total population by adding the populations of Cyprus, Israel, Jordan, Lebanon, Palestine, Syria, and Turkey's Hatay Province.)
- Demonym: Levantine
- Languages: Arabic, Aramaic, Armenian, Circassian, Domari, Greek, Hebrew, Kurdish, Turkish
- Time Zones: UTC+02:00 (EET) and UTC+03:00 (TRT/AST)
- Largest cities: List: (Jordan) Amman (Syria) Aleppo (Lebanon) Beirut (Syria) Damascus (Israel) (Palestine) Jerusalem

The Levant (Note: /ləˈvænt/ lə-VANT, US also /ləˈvɑːnt/ lə-VAHNT) is a subregion of West Asia along the Eastern Mediterranean that forms part of the Middle East. The term is often used in conjunction with historical or cultural references.

In its narrowest sense, used in archaeology and other contexts, the Levant refers to Cyprus and land bordering the Levantine Sea (Mediterranean) in West Asia that includes Syria, Lebanon, Jordan, Palestine, Israel, and south Cilicia (Turkey). In its widest historical sense, the Levant included all the Eastern Mediterranean; extending from Greece to Egypt and Cyrenaica (Eastern Libya). The Levantine corridor represents the land bridge between Africa and Eurasia, has been described as the crossroads of West Asia, Eastern Mediterranean, and Northeast Africa, and geologically as the "northwest of the Arabian plate".

In the 13th and 14th centuries, levante was used for Italian maritime commerce in the Eastern Mediterranean, including Greece, Anatolia, Syria-Palestine, and Egypt, that is the lands east of Venice. It derives from the Italian levante, meaning "rising", implying the rising of the Sun in the east, and is broadly equivalent to the Mashriq, (Note: Arabic: ٱلْمَشْرِق, pronounced [ʔal.maʃ.riq]) meaning "eastern place, where the Sun rises". Eventually the term was restricted to the Muslim countries of Syria-Palestine and Egypt. The term entered English in the 15th century from French. In 1581, England set up the Levant Company to trade with the Ottoman Empire. The name Levant States was used to refer to the French mandate over Syria and Lebanon after World War I, so Levant has come to refer to modern Syria, Lebanon, Palestine, Israel, Jordan, and Cyprus.

As a name for the contemporary region, several dictionaries consider Levant to be archaic. The noun Levant and adjective Levantine are sometimes used to describe the ancient and modern culture area formerly called Syro-Palestinian. Archaeologists now speak of the Levant and Levantine archaeology, food scholars of Levantine cuisine, and Latin Catholics of the Levant are sometimes called Levantines, though the term is normally used to describe the Levant population more widely.

== Etymology ==
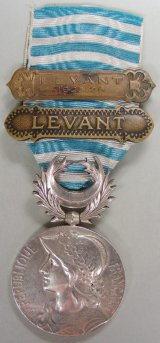
French medal commemorating the Franco–Turkish War in Cilicia, c. 1920

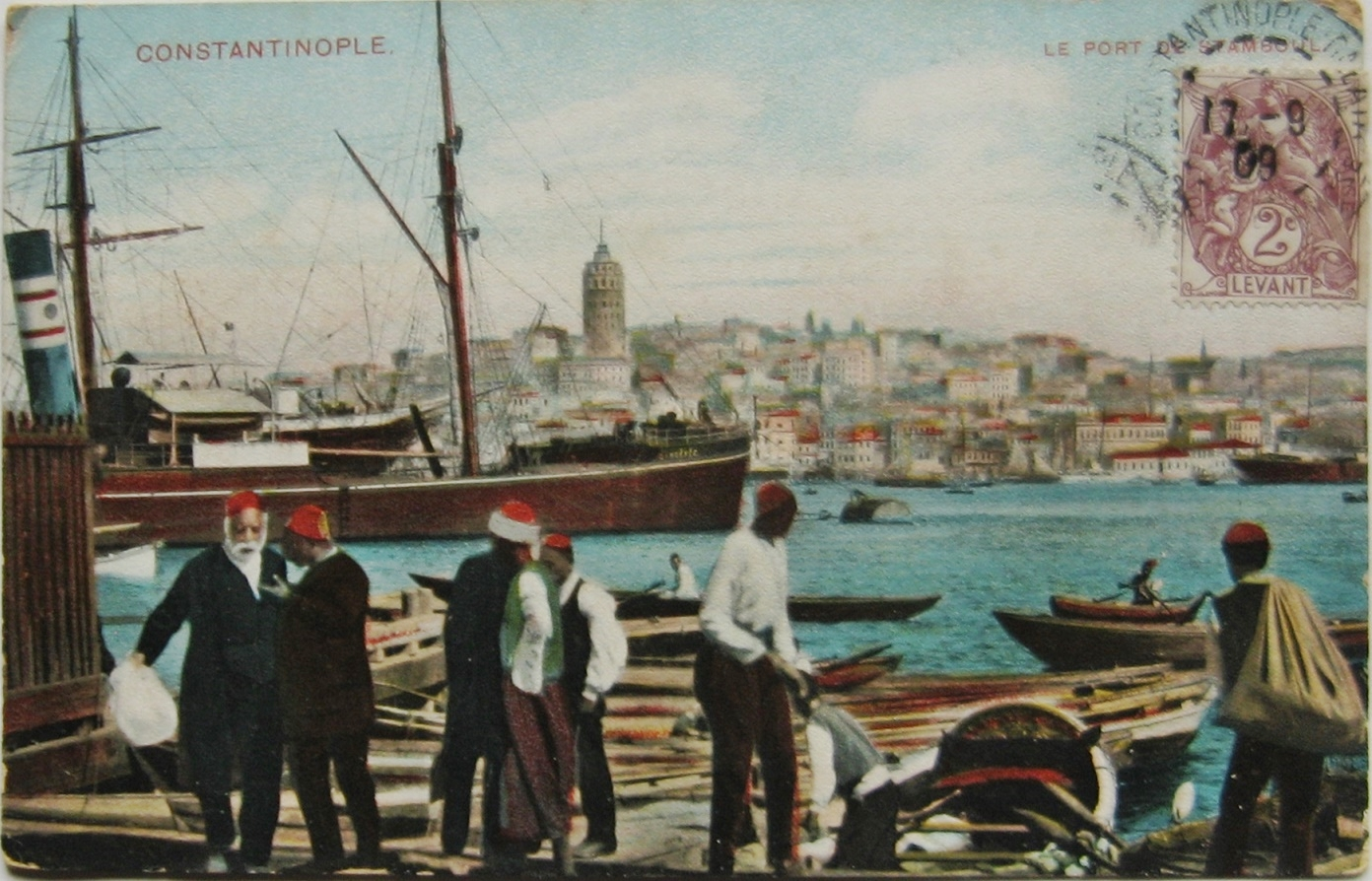
1909 postcard depicting Ottoman Constantinople and bearing a French stamp inscribed "Levant"

The term Levant appears in English in 1497, and originally meant "the East" or "Mediterranean lands east of Italy". It is borrowed from the French levant "rising", referring to the rising of the sun in the east, or the point where the sun rises. The phrase is ultimately from the Latin word levare, meaning "lift, raise". Similar etymologies are found in Greek Ἀνατολή Anatolē (cf. Anatolia 'the direction of sunrise'), in Germanic Morgenland (lit. 'morning land'), in Italian (as in Riviera di Levante, the portion of the Liguria coast east of Genoa), in Hungarian Kelet ('east'), in Spanish and Catalan Levante and Llevant ('the place of rising'), and in Hebrew מִזְרָח mizraḥ ('east'). Most notably, "Orient" and its Latin source oriens meaning "east", is literally "rising", deriving from Latin orior "rise".

The notion of the Levant has undergone a dynamic process of historical evolution in usage, meaning, and understanding. While the term "Levantine" originally referred to the European residents of the eastern Mediterranean region, it later came to refer to regional "native" and "minority" groups.

The term became current in English in the 16th century, along with the first English merchant adventurers in the region; English ships appeared in the Mediterranean in the 1570s, and the English merchant company signed its agreement ("capitulations") with the Ottoman Sultan in 1579. The English Levant Company was founded in 1581 to trade with the Ottoman Empire, and in 1670 the French Compagnie du Levant was founded for the same purpose. At this time, the Far East was known as the "Upper Levant".

In early 19th-century travel writing, the term sometimes incorporated certain Mediterranean provinces of the Ottoman Empire, as well as independent Greece (and especially the Greek islands). In 19th-century archaeology, it referred to overlapping cultures in this region during and after prehistoric times, intending to reference the place instead of any one culture. The French mandate of Syria and Lebanon (1920–1946) was called the Levant states.

== Geography and modern use of the term ==
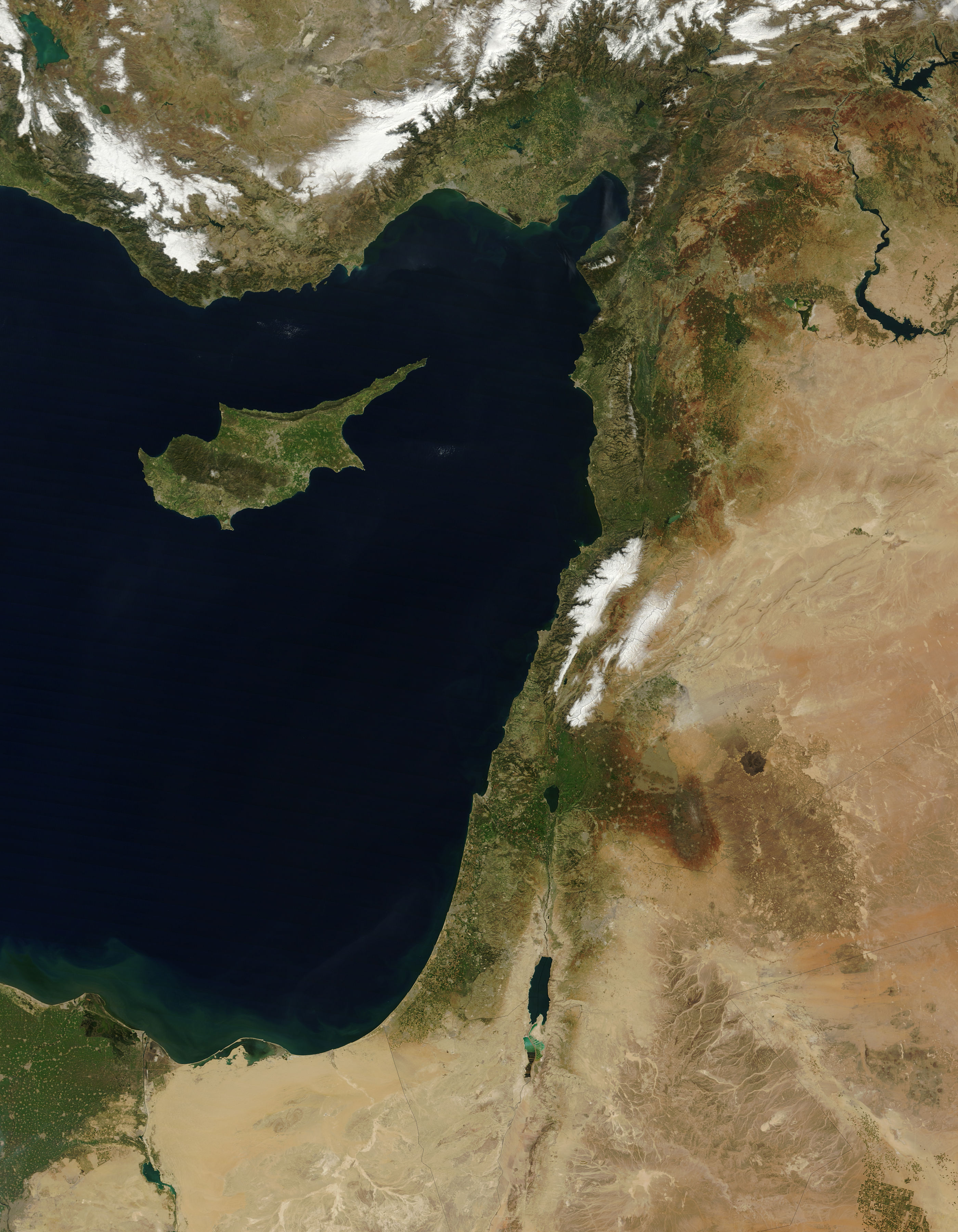
Satellite view of the Levant including Cyprus, Syria, Lebanon, Israel, Palestine, Jordan, Hatay (Turkey) and the Northern Sinai (Egypt).

Today, "Levant" is the term typically used by archaeologists and historians in relation to the history of the region. Scholars have adopted the term Levant to identify the region due to its being a "wider, yet relevant, cultural corpus" that does not have the "political overtones" of Syria-Palestine. (Note: "Nevertheless, despite such a well-reasoned basis for the identification of Levantine archaeology, the adoption of this term by many scholars has been, for the most part, simply the result of individual attempts to consider a wider, yet relevant, cultural corpus than that which is suggested by the use of terms like Canaan, Israel, or even Syria-Palestine. Regardless of the manner in which the term has come into common use, for a couple of additional reasons it seems clear that the Levant will remain the term of choice. In the first place scholars have shown a penchant for the term Levant, despite the fact that the term 'Syria-Palestine' has been advocated since the late 1970s. This is evident from the fact that no journal or series today has adopted a title that includes 'Syria-Palestine'. However, the journal Levant has been published since 1969 and since 1990, Ägypten und Levante has also attracted a plethora of papers relating to the archaeology of this region. Furthermore, a search through any electronic database of titles reveals an overwhelming adoption of the term 'Levant' when compared to 'Syria-Palestine' for archaeological studies. Undoubtedly, this is mostly due to the fact that 'Syria-Palestine' was a Roman administrative division of the Levant created by Hadrian (Millar 1993). The term 'Syria-Palestine' also carries political overtones that inadvertently evoke current efforts to establish a full-fledged Palestinian state. Scholars have recognized, therefore, that—for at least the time being—they can spare themselves further headaches by adopting the term Levant to identify this region" (Burke 2010, p. 84)) (Note: "At the beginning of this Introduction I have indicated how difficult it is to choose a general accepted name for the region this book deals with. In Europe we are used to the late Roman name 'Palestine,' and the designation 'Palestinian Archaeology' has a long history. According to Byzantine usage it included CisJordan and TransJordan and even Lebanon and Sinai. In modern times, however, the name 'Palestine' has exclusively become the political designation for a restricted area. Furthermore, in the period this book deals with a region called 'Palestine' did not yet exist. Also the ancient name 'Canaan' cannot be used as it refers to an older period in history. Designations as: 'The Land(s) of the Bible' or 'the Holy Land' evoke the suspicion of a theological bias. 'The Land of Israel' does not apply to the situation because it never included Lebanon or the greater part of modern Jordan. Therefore I have joined those who today advocate the designation 'Southern Levant.' Although I confess that it is an awkward name, it is at least strictly geographical." (Geus 2003, p. 6)) The term is also used for modern events, peoples, states or parts of states in the same region, namely Cyprus, Egypt, Iraq, Israel, Jordan, Lebanon, Palestine, Syria, and Turkey are sometimes considered Levant countries (compare with Near East, Middle East, Eastern Mediterranean and West Asia). Several researchers include the island of Cyprus in Levantine studies, including the Council for British Research in the Levant (CBRL), the UCLA Near Eastern Languages and Cultures department, Journal of Levantine Studies and the UCL Institute of Archaeology, the last of which has dated the connection between Cyprus and mainland Levant to the early Iron Age. Archaeologists seeking a neutral orientation that is neither biblical nor national have used terms such as Levantine archaeology and archaeology of the Southern Levant.

While the usage of the term "Levant" in academia has been restricted to the fields of archeology and literature, there is a recent attempt to reclaim the notion of the Levant as a category of analysis in political and social sciences. Two academic journals were launched in the early 2010s using the word: the Journal of Levantine Studies, published by the Van Leer Jerusalem Institute and The Levantine Review, published by Boston College.

The word Levant has been used in some translations of the term ash-Shām as used by the organization known as ISIL, ISIS, and other names, though there is disagreement as to whether this translation is accurate.

=== Archaeological definition ===
In The Oxford Handbook of the Archaeology of the Levant: c. 8000–332 BCE (OHAL; 2013), the definition of the Levant for the specific purposes of the book is synonymous to that of the Arabic "bilad al-sham, 'the land of sham [Syria]'", translating in Western parlance to greater Syria. OHAL defines the boundaries of the Levant as follows.

- To the north: the Taurus Mountains or the Plain of 'Amuq
- To the east: the eastern deserts, i.e. (from north to south) the Euphrates and the Jebel el-Bishrī area for the northern Levant, followed by the Syrian Desert east of the eastern hinterland of the Anti-Lebanon range (whose southernmost part is Mount Hermon), and Transjordan's highlands and eastern desert (also discussed at Syrian Desert, also known as the Badia region). In other words, Mesopotamia and the North Arabian Desert.
- To the south: Wadi al-Arish in Sinai
- To the west: the Mediterranean Sea

Subregions

A distinction is made between the main subregions of the Levant, the northern and the southern:

- The Litani River marks the division between the Northern Levant and the Southern Levant.

The island of Cyprus is also included as a third subregion in the archaeological region of the Levant:

- Cyprus, geographically distinct from the Levant, is included due to its proximity and natural resources (copper in particular), which induced close cultural ties.

== Demographics ==
Historical population of the Levant
Year	Pop.	±%
100	4,800,000	—
500	4,127,000	−14.0%
900	3,120,000	−24.4%
1897	3,231,874	+3.6%
1914	3,448,356	+6.7%
1922	3,198,951	−7.2%

The region is inhabited by Levantine Arabs, Jews, Kurds, Assyrians, Armenians, Chechens and Circassians. The population of the modern Levant border is approximately 57.6 million consisting of the populations of Syria, Jordan, Israel, Lebanon and Palestine.

State	Population (2023)	Density/km2 (2018)	Life expectancy (2024)
Israel	10,094,000	458	83.20 years
Jordan	11,484,805	114	77.98 years
Lebanon	5,364,482	513	77.94 years
Palestine	5,483,450	731	69.21 years
Syria	25,255,139	118.3	72.56 years
Total	57,681,876	184.2	75.56

=== Religious and ethnic groups ===
Current religious map of the Levant and Mesopotamia. Suni Muslims Shia Muslims Alevi Muslims Christians Jews Druze Irreligious

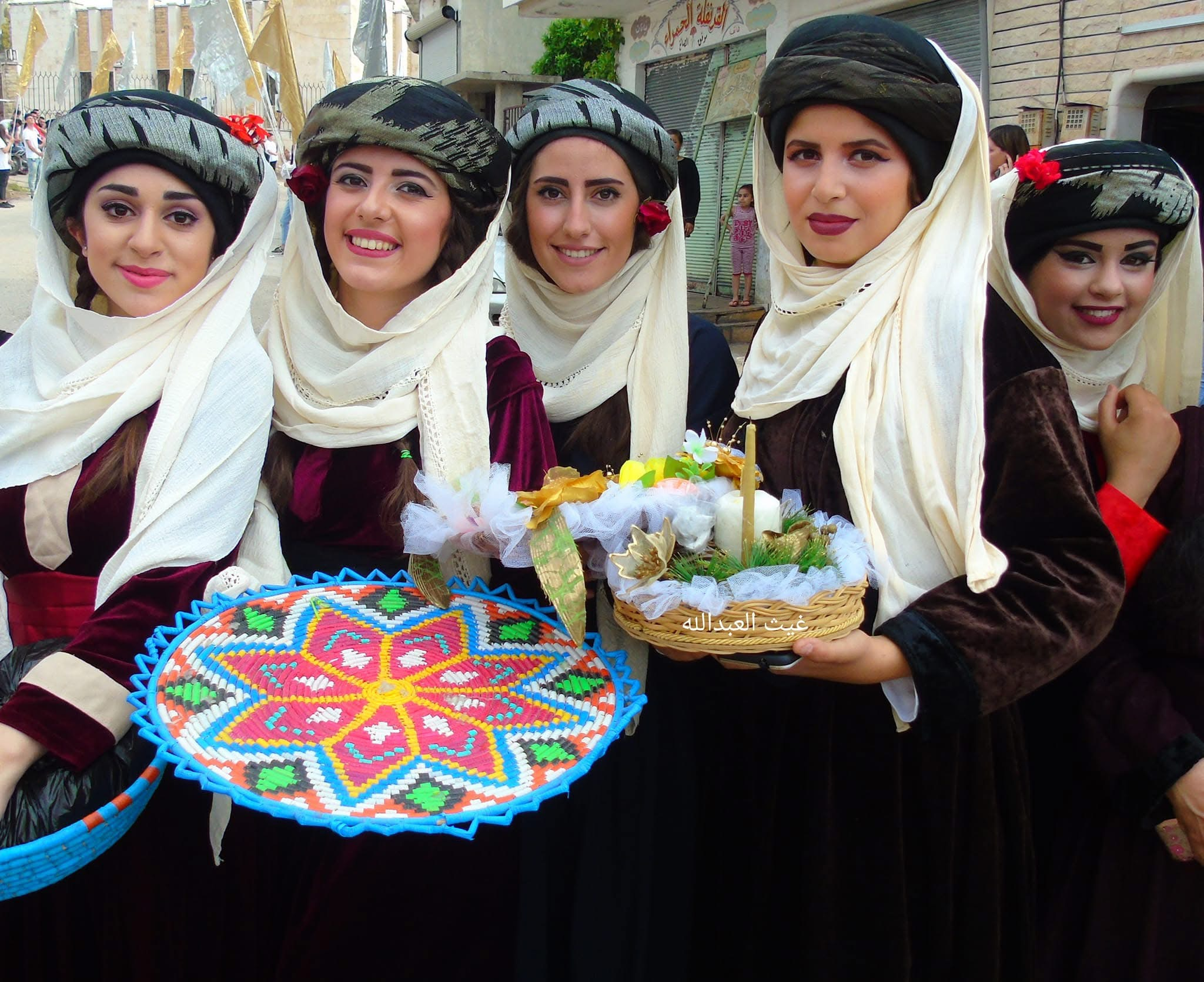
Syrians in traditional folk costume in Al-Suqaylabiyah, Syria.

The majority of Levantines are Muslims. Islam was first introduced into the region following the Muslim conquest of the Levant in the 7th century; however, a Muslim majority may have only reached by the 13th century. The majority of Levantine Muslims are Sunnis adhering to the four madhhabs (Hanafi, Shafi'i, Hanbali, and Maliki). Other Islamic denominations include the Alawites and Nizari Ismailis in Syria, and Twelver Shi'ite Muslims in Lebanon.

As the birthplace of Christianity, the Levant has many Christian denominations and various churches, mainly the Antiochian Greek Orthodox, Syriac Orthodox, and various Eastern Catholic (Syriac Catholic, Melkite and Maronite) denominations. Armenians mostly belong to the Armenian Apostolic Church. There are also Assyrians belonging to the Assyrian Church of the East and the Chaldean Catholic Church.

Other religious groups in the Levant include Jews, Samaritans, Druze, and Yazidis.

=== Languages ===
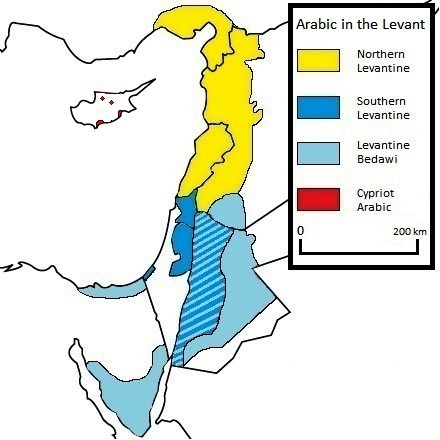
Map representing the distribution of the Arabic dialects in the area of the Levant

Most populations in the Levant speak Levantine Arabic (شامي, Šāmī), a variety of Arabic descended from the pre-Islamic Arabic dialects of Syria and Hejazi Arabic, but retaining significant influence from Western Middle Aramaic. Levantine Arabic is usually classified as North Levantine Arabic in Lebanon, Syria, and parts of Turkey, and South Levantine Arabic in Palestine and Jordan. Each of these encompasses a spectrum of regional or urban/rural variations. In addition to the varieties normally grouped together as "Levantine", a number of other varieties and dialects of Arabic are spoken in the Levant area, such as Levantine Bedawi Arabic (by Bedouins) and Mesopotamian Arabic (in eastern Syria).

Of the languages of Cyprus, the two official languages are Turkish and Greek. The most used languages by population are Greek in the south followed by Turkish in the north. Two minority languages are recognized: Armenian, and Cypriot Maronite Arabic, a hybrid of mostly medieval Arabic vernaculars with strong influence from contact with Turkish and Greek, spoken by approximately 1,000 people.

Concerning the languages of Israel, Modern Hebrew is the country's official language, and almost the entire population speaks it either as a first language or proficiently as a second language. Arabic is used mainly by Israel's Arab minority while English is widely used.

Western Neo-Aramaic is additionally spoken in three villages in Syria: Maaloula, Jubb'adin and Bakhah.

Among diaspora communities based in the Levant, Greek, Armenian, and Circassian are also spoken.

=== Genetics ===
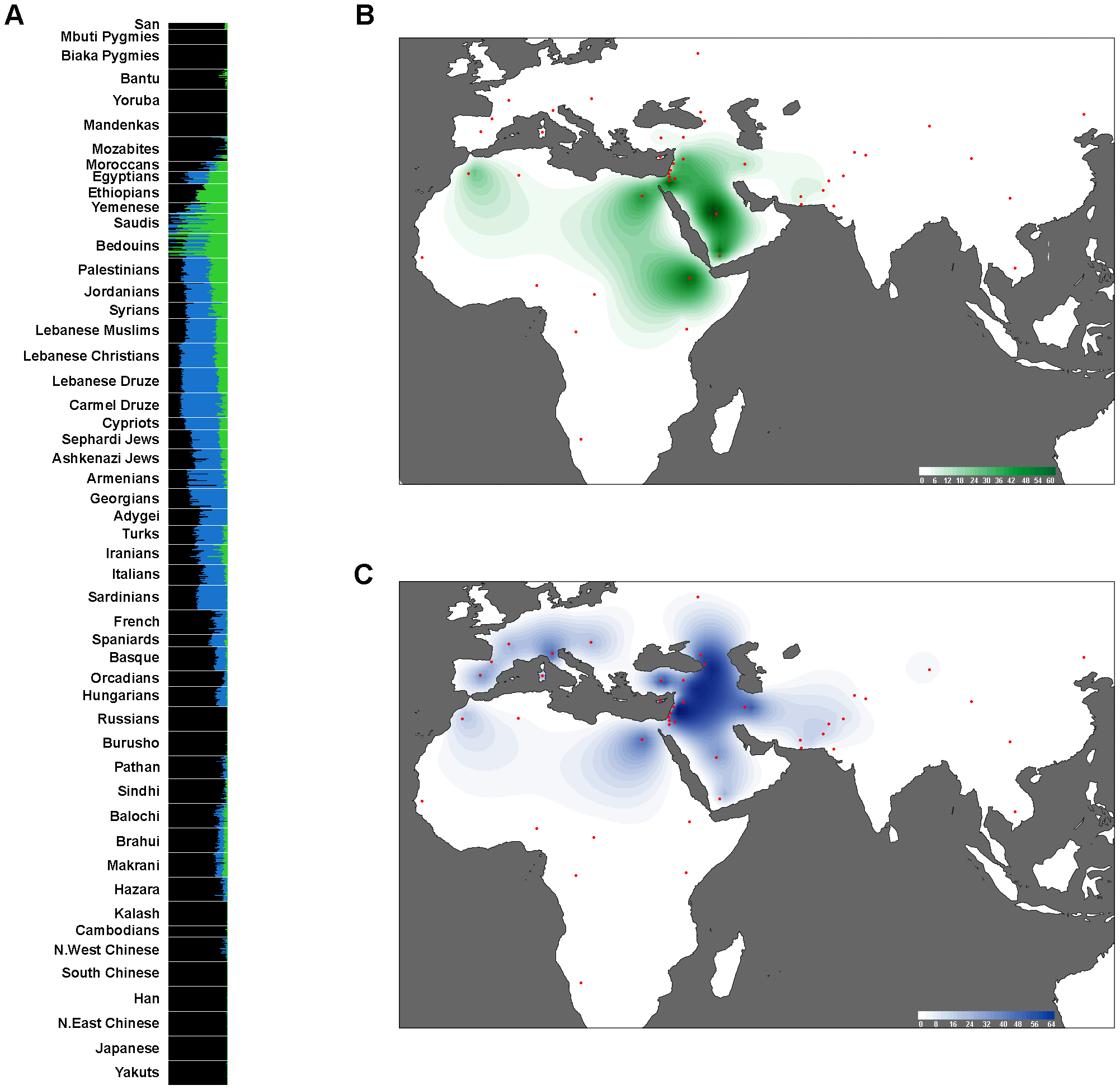
Levantine ancestral component highlighted in blue

Ancient DNA analysis has confirmed the genetic relationship between Natufians and other ancient and modern Middle Easterners. The presence of Neolithic Anatolian and Neolithic Iranian ancestry among modern Levantines can be attributed to migrations during the Neolithic and Bronze Ages.

According to recent ancient DNA studies, Levantines derive most of their ancestry from ancient Semitic-speaking peoples of the Bronze and Iron age Levant. Other Arabs include the Bedouins of Syrian Desert, Naqab and eastern Syria, who speak Bedouin Arabic. Non-Arab minorities include Circassians, Chechens, Turks, Jews, Turkmens, Assyrians, Kurds, Nawars, and Armenians.

== See also ==
- Fertile Crescent
- French post offices in the Ottoman Empire ("Levant" stamps)
- Wildlife of the Levant
