= Jewish Palestinian Aramaic =

Western Aramaic dialect

Jewish Aramaic
- Region: Judea, Levant
- Ethnicity: Jews
- Era: 150 BCE – 1200 CE
- Language family: Afro-Asiatic: Semitic; Central Semitic; Northwest Semitic; Aramaic; Western Aramaic; Jewish Aramaic
- Dialects: Galilean dialect; Judean dialect
- Writing system: Aramaic alphabet

Language codes
- ISO 639-3: jpa
- Glottolog: gali1269

Jewish Palestinian Aramaic was a Western Aramaic language spoken by the Jews during the Classic Era in Judea and the Levant.

== Description ==
The language was used specifically in Hasmonean, Herodian and Roman Judaea and adjacent lands in the late first millennium BCE, and later in Syria Palaestina and Palaestina Secunda in the early first millennium CE. This language is sometimes called Galilean Aramaic, although that term more specifically refers to its Galilean dialect.

The most notable text in the Jewish Palestinian Aramaic corpus is the Jerusalem Talmud, which is still studied in Jewish religious schools and academically, although not as widely as the Babylonian Talmud, most of which is written in Jewish Babylonian Aramaic. There are some older texts in Jewish Palestinian Aramaic, notably the Megillat Taanit: the Babylonian Talmud contains occasional quotations from these. Dead Sea Scroll 4Q246, found in Qumran, is written in this language as well.

The Targum and like texts are written in Late Jewish Literary Aramaic. It is the final stage of Jewish Palestinian Aramaic.

There were some differences in the dialects between Judea and Galilee, and most surviving texts are in the Galilean dialect. Michael Sokoloff has published separate dictionaries of the two dialects. A Galilean dialect of Aramaic was probably a language spoken by Jesus.

Jewish Palestinian Aramaic was gradually replaced by Arabic following the Muslim conquest of the Levant in the seventh century.

== Grammar ==
=== Orthography ===
י, ו, א, ה are used to denote vowels. וו and יי are also used as replacements for their singular counterparts in the middle of words.

== Sample text ==
| JPA | English |
|---|---|
| בת גבר אביינוס דאתרה | The daughter of an important man of the place |
| לית אפשר לאבילא למיכל מיניה | It is impossible for the mourner to eat from it |
| דחסיר אבר או יתיר אבר | Lacking a limb or having an extra limb |

== See also ==
- Christian Palestinian Aramaic
- Jewish Babylonian Aramaic
- Mandaic language
- Samaritan Aramaic
- Western Neo-Aramaic

== Sources ==
- Dalman, Gustaf (1905). Grammatik des jüdisch-palästinischen Aramäisch (2nd ed.). Leipzig: Leipzig, Hinrichs.
- Caspar Levias (1986). A Grammar of Galilean Aramaic. The Jewish Theological Seminary of America. ISBN 0-87334-030-2.
- Beyer, Klaus (1986). The Aramaic Language: Its Distribution and Subdivisions. Göttingen: Vandenhoeck & Ruprecht. ISBN 9783525535738.
- Gzella, Holger (2015). A Cultural History of Aramaic: From the Beginnings to the Advent of Islam. Leiden-Boston: Brill. ISBN 9789004285101.
- Sokoloff, Michael (1990). A Dictionary of Jewish Palestinian Aramaic of the Byzantine Period. Ramat Gan: Bar Ilan University Press. ISBN 9789652261014.
- Sokoloff, Michael (2003). A Dictionary of Judean Aramaic. Ramat Gan: Bar Ilan University Press. ISBN 9789652262615.
- Sokoloff, Michael (2012a). "Jewish Palestinian Aramaic". The Semitic Languages: An International Handbook. Berlin-Boston: Walter de Gruyter. pp. 610–619. ISBN 9783110251586.
- Stevenson, William B. (1924). Grammar of Palestinian Jewish Aramaic. Oxford: Clarendon Press. ISBN 9781725206175.
