= Convent of Saint Thecla (Maaloula) =

Greek Orthodox convent in Maaloula, Syria

- Arabic: دير مار تقلا
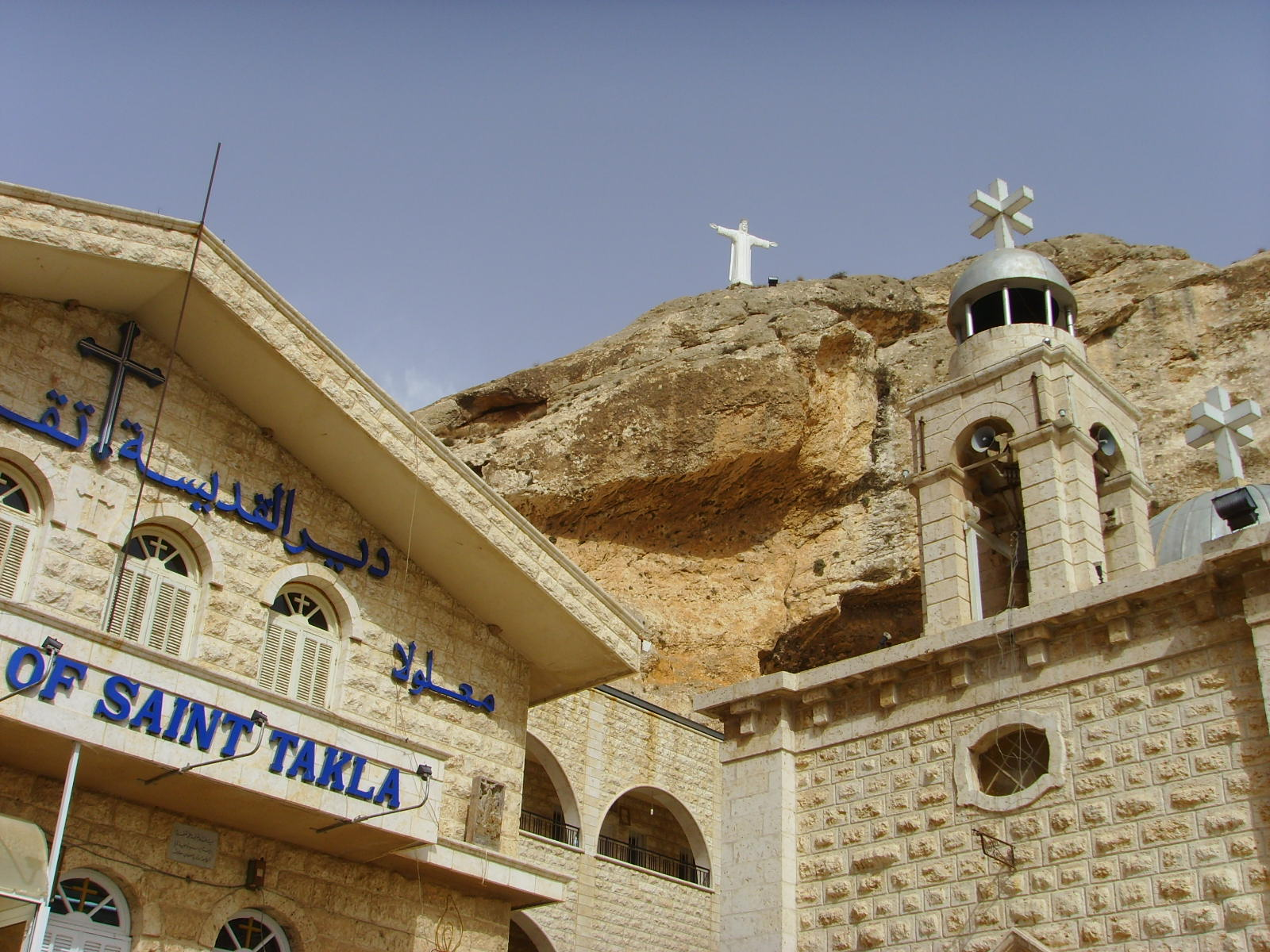
- Denomination: Greek Orthodox Church of Antioch

Site
- Location: Maaloula, al-Qutayfah District, Rif Dimashq Governorate, Syria
- Coordinates: 33.847300°N 36.546729°E

The Convent of Saint Thecla (Mar Taqla) (Arabic: دير مار تقلا) is a Greek Orthodox convent in Maaloula, Syria. It is administered by the Greek Orthodox Patriarchate of Antioch. The convent was built in 1935 around the grotto of St. Thecla.

== Location ==
St Thecla Ma‘lula is located northeast of Damascus at an altitude of 1600 meters in the mountainous region of Qalamoun. The village of Ma‘lula' is isolated and naturally protected, which may largely explain its inhabitants’ continuing adherence to Christianity and the Aramaic language. This convent is a major place of Christian pilgrimage in Syria.

The name "Ma‘lula", meaning ‘entrance’ in Aramaic, refers to the village's position at the opening of a narrow pass between two steep hills.

== Legend of St Thecla ==
According to the legend of St Thecla, Thecla was a girl who belonged to a noble pagan family from Qalamoun. At age 18, Thecla ran away from home. Her father had arranged her marriage to a pagan, but she wanted to be a Christian. In the most common version of her story, Roman soldiers chased her to the third range of Qalamoun. Reaching the vicinity of Ma‘lula, she found the way blocked by a rocky height; yet, the moment she prayed for God's mercy, the barrier was miraculously divided. This miracle allowed her to pass through into the grotto and escape capture and death. Thecla spent the rest of her life there.

In the grotto, Thecla dug into a natural spring. The faithful believe these to be sacred waters that can cure paralysis, rheumatism, and infertility. Thecla spent her life healing the sick and preaching the Christian faith, finally dying at age 90. She is buried in the grotto.

== Pilgrims ==
St. Thecla's reputation as a healing saint has drawn many visitors to the convent to pay visits and fulfill vows. Pilgrim families now stay at the guest-house attached to the convent. Previously, however, visitors spent the afternoon and night in the grotto, prostrated themselves at dawn before the iconostasis, and drank the holy water of the spring. If the supplicant were a pregnant woman, she would eat a tuft of wick from the oil-lamp in the grotto. Supplicants who were too sick to go to Ma‘lula in person gave visitors their written prayers to place before the tomb of St. Thecla.

Veneration of the saints in Syria is frequent even among Muslims. Despite the spread of Islam in the region, local inhabitants have retained a firm faith in St Thecla, permitting the survival and prosperity of the convent. Many prayers offered to St Thecla in her grotto are preceded by Qur'anic recitations. Reportedly, childless Muslim women frequently became pregnant as a result of her intercession. Some of these couples would even have a longed-for child baptized as a mark of reverence for the saint.

== Activities ==
The convent of St Thecla depends directly on the Patriarchate of Antioch and is administered by a mother superior, now Pelagia Sayyaf. Seven nuns and the mother superior live at the convent. As in most Orthodox monasteries, their daily lives consist mainly of fulfilling prayer obligations. Each nun performs prayers by herself every morning, and three days each week are allocated for communal prayers. Because the convent of St Thecla is a shrine for the people of Qalamoun and Christians throughout the Near East, the nuns are always prepared to welcome visitors and guide them throughout the convent. Parish activities are constant at the convent, especially the liturgies on Sundays and feast days. The nuns share the tasks of cleaning and tidying the convent buildings; by tradition, however, special care of St Thecla's grotto church is given to the eldest nun.

In addition to these duties, the nuns practice manual crafts, such as sewing and embroidery, making rosaries, and decorating icons with pearls. Since Pelagia Sayyaf's appointment as mother superior, the nuns have also run a small orphanage. The nuns derive all their daily needs from the town of Ma‘lula; they seldom leave the convent, except to supervise agricultural work in the nearby fields or, occasionally, to travel to Damascus for goods that are locally unavailable. On such visits, they may take the opportunity to visit the Patriarchate.

== History ==
The Qalamoun region became Christian in the fourth century, the period when the first monasteries were founded: indeed, Christian manuscripts from this period have been preserved by the monks of Ma‘lula. Following its arrival in the seventh century, Islam penetrated the Qalamoun region slowly, gradually becoming established in the first range and the surrounding plains before spreading to the second range in the ninth century. However, stubborn Christian resistance halted Islamic penetration of the third range until the sixteenth and seventeenth centuries.

The monastery of St Thecla and the church of St John the Baptist were rebuilt in 1756, according to the chronicle of Mikha’il al-Burayk. The Russian consul Uspensky records four monks at St Thecla in 1840.

In 1906, a church was built at the grotto over the remains of an ancient church of unknown date. The convent building was begun in 1935, and a second floor was added in 1959.

== The convent today ==
The ground floor of the St Thecla convent contains a reception room, refectory, and display rooms for the sale of religious artifacts; the second floor is entirely occupied by the cells of the nuns. Just below the building is a kitchen, including a baking-stone used for making bread; above it, another building dating to 1888 has recently been restored as a patriarchal residence. A guest-house for tourists and visitors was built in 1934. A ladder at the top of the main convent building leads directly to the shrine of St Thecla, a rock-grotto that dates back to the earliest Christian centuries. The grotto is divided into a sacred spring and two small churches, which have recently been modernized.

== Icons ==
The icons are located in the iconostasis of the convent church of St John the Baptist, in the saint's grotto, and in the mother superior's wing. With the exception of a few contemporary twentieth-century icons, they date from the mid-eighteenth to the late-nineteenth century.

=== Eighteenth-century icons ===
Three examples of the work of Patriarch Sylvestros are exhibited in the church of St John the Baptist.

- The first icon represents Christ, blessing with his right hand and holding the Gospel upon his lap with his left. St John the Baptist stands to the left, leaning towards Christ and blessing with his right hand, while his left is folded upon an open document in Arabic, reading: "Behold the Lamb of God, who takes away the sins of the world."
- The second icon represents the Virgin Mary, the Child on her left arm, leaning towards his mother with his eyes upon the spectator. To the right of the couple stands St Thecla, carrying a decorative metal cross in her right hand and making the sign of peace with her left.
- The third icon represents the Annunciation: the Angel Gabriel offers a rose to Mary, who reaches for it.

The grotto contains two icons.

- The first icon shows the Resurrection; Christ, transfigured in light, blesses with his right hand and carries a banner in his left. To the right sits an angel, and to the left, women bearing perfumes; at the bottom are three guards in different positions. Behind the scene is the city and surrounding gardens, the first light of morning rising upon them.
- The second icon represents the Nativity of the Virgin, in which the infant Mary is raised upon the angel's hand to be crowned and invested with the Holy Spirit.

The mother superior's wing of the convent contains several more icons. One icon represents the archangel Michael, another icon Moses the Black. A third icon represents St Elias sitting at the door of his cave while ravens bring him food.

The sanctuary of the convent church contains an icon showing two saints, probably St. Cosmas and Damian.

=== Nineteenth century icons ===
The nineteenth-century icons are also found in the convent church. The main group, on the upper register of the iconostasis, represents the Nativity of the Virgin, the Purification, the Dormition, the Baptism of Christ, the Transfiguration, the Descent from the Cross, the Resurrection, and Pentecost. Separately, there are three large icons painted on fabric. The first fabric icon represents St Thecla and the other two an assortment of biblical and hagiographical scenes.

A wooden cross in the convent church displays the Crucified Lord in the center, surrounded by the Virgin, St John the Apostle and the symbols of the four Evangelists. Nearby is an icon of Sts Sergius and Bacchus on horseback in military uniform.

The last group of icons belongs to the Jerusalem school, known for its fusion of traditional Eastern iconography and European painting styles. Among them are four icons by the greatest representative of the school, Mikha’il Mhanna al-Qudsi.
