= Maaloula =

Town in Syria

Maaloula معلولا ܡܥܠܘܠܐ - מעלולא
- Town
- Overview of Maaloula, 2025

- Location in Syria
- Coordinates: 33°50′39″N 36°32′48″E
- Country: Syria
- Governorate: Rif Dimashq
- District: al-Qutayfah
- Subdistrict: Maaloula
- Elevation: 1,500 m (4,900 ft)

Population (2004 census)
  - Total: 2,762

Maaloula (Arabic: مَعلُولَا; Western Neo-Aramaic: ܡܥܠܘܠܐ ,מעלולא, romanized: Maʿlūlā) is a town in southwestern Syria. The town is located in the Rif Dimashq Governorate and is 56 km northeast of Damascus, and is built into the mountainside at an altitude of more than 1,500m. It is known as one of three remaining villages where Western Neo-Aramaic is spoken, the other two being the nearby smaller villages of Jubb'adin and the now depopulated Bakha.

== Etymology ==
Maʿlūlā is said to derive from the Aramaic word maʿəlā, meaning "entrance". The name is romanized as Maaloula, Ma'loula, Maalula, Ma'lula, Malula. However, "Maaloula" is the most common.

== History ==
=== Civil war ===
Maaloula became the scene of battle between the Al-Qaeda-linked insurgent group Al-Nusra Front and the Syrian Army in September 2013.

The insurgents took over the town on October 21. Around 13 people were killed, with many more wounded.

On October 28, government forces recaptured the town.

Maaloula was again taken over by the Al-Nusra Front on December 3, 2013. The group took 12 Orthodox nuns as hostages. The nuns were moved between different locations and ended up in Yabroud where they were held for three months. Officials from Lebanon negotiated a deal for their release. Those negotiations produced an agreement on a prisoner exchange under which around 150 Syrian women detained by the government were also freed. After the nuns were freed on 9 March 2014, they stated that they were mostly treated well by their captors.

On 14 April 2014, with the help of Hezbollah and SSNP, the Syrian Army once again recaptured the town. The success of Syrian government forces in recapturing Maaloula was part of a string of other successes in the strategic Qalamoun region, including the seizure of the former rebel bastion of Yabroud in the previous month.

== Demographics ==
In 1838, its inhabitants were Antiochian Greek Orthodox Christians, Melkite Catholics, and a minority of Sunni Muslims.

Presently, the population maintains religious diversity, with both Christians and Muslims identifying ethnically as Arameans Notably, the Muslim inhabitants have a remarkable legacy as they haven’t embraced an Arab ethnic identity, unlike the majority of other Syrians who underwent Islamization and, consequently, Arabization over the centuries.

In the middle of the 20th century, 15,000 people lived in Maaloula.

According to the Syria Central Bureau of Statistics, Maaloula had a population of 2,762 in the 2004 census. However, the population increases to about 10,000 during the summer, due to people coming from Damascus for holidays.

== Language ==
With two other nearby towns, Bakh'a and Jubb'adin, Maaloula is the only place where a Western Aramaic language is still spoken, which it has been able to retain amidst the rise of Arabic due to its distance from other major cities and its isolating geological features. However, modern roads and transportation, as well as accessibility to Arabic-language television and print media – and for some time until recently, also state policy – have eroded that linguistic heritage.

As the last remaining area where Western Neo-Aramaic is still spoken, the three villages represent an important source for anthropological linguistic studies regarding first century Western Aramaic. According to scholarly consensus, the language of Jesus was a Western Middle Aramaic variety, Galilean Aramaic.

== Monasteries ==
There are two important monasteries in Maaloula: the Melkite Catholic monastery of Mar Sarkis and the Antiochian Greek Orthodox Convent of Saint Thecla.

=== Saint Sarkis Monastic Complex ===
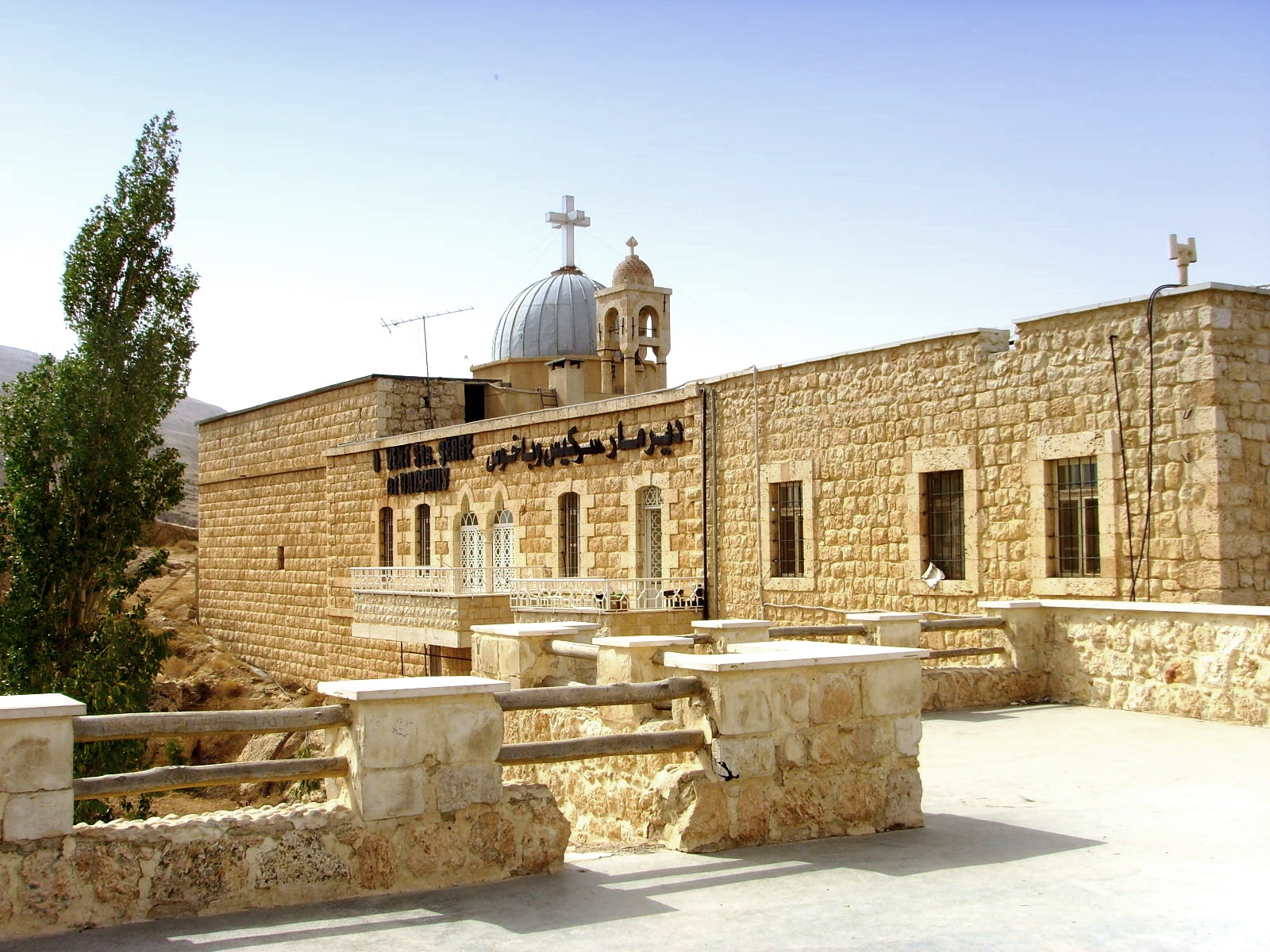
The monastic complex of Saint Sarkis

The Saint Sarkis Monastic Complex of Maaloula is one of the oldest surviving monasteries in Syria. It was built on the site of a pagan temple, and has elements which go back to the fifth to sixth century Byzantine period.

Saint Sarkis is the Aramaic name for Sergius, a Roman soldier who was executed for his Christian beliefs. This monastery still maintains its solemn historical character.

The monastery has two of the oldest icons in the world, one depicting the Last Supper.

=== Convent of Saint Thecla ===
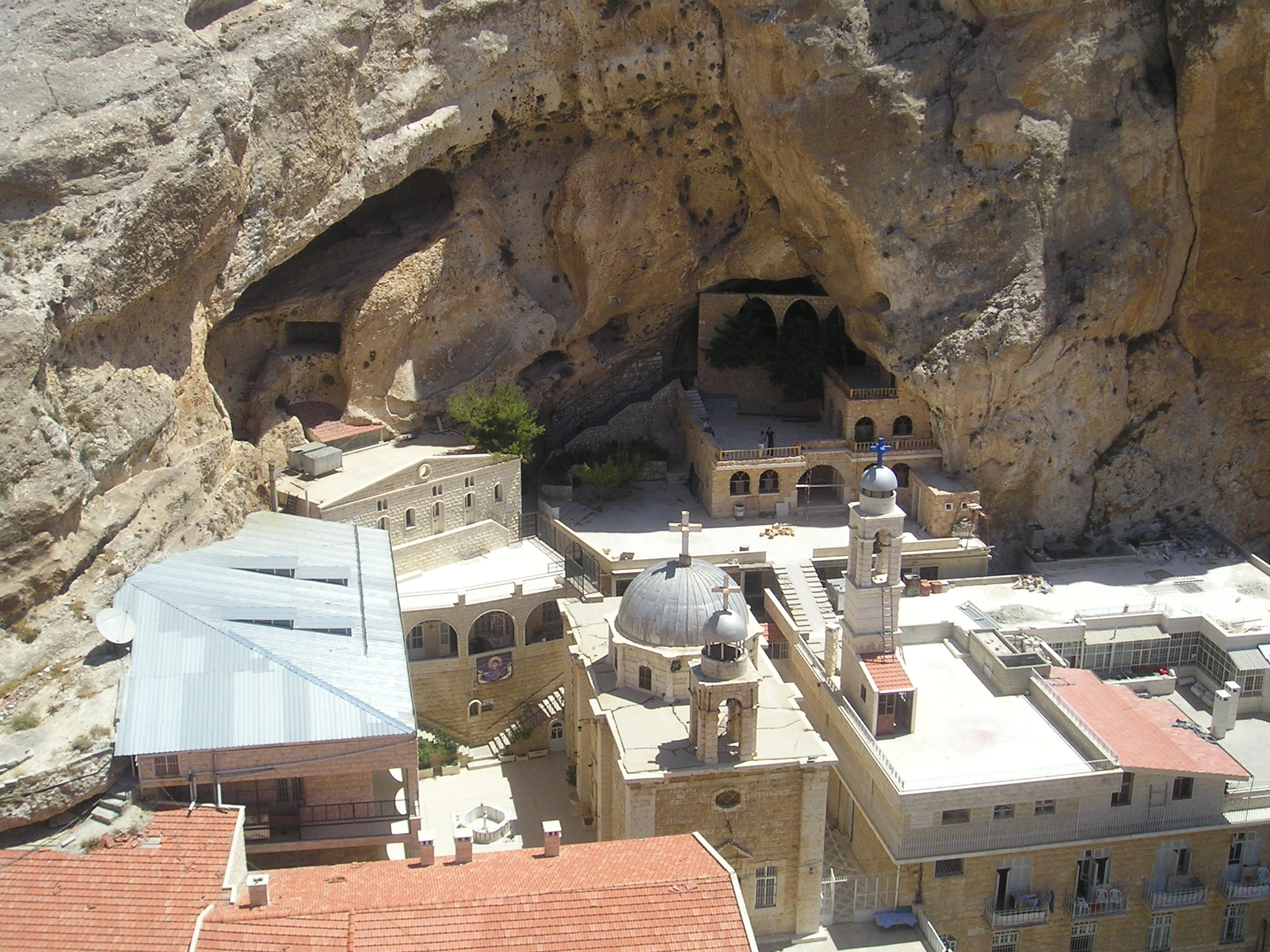
The Convent of Saint Thecla

This convent holds the remains of Thecla, which the second-century Acts of Paul and Thecla accounts a noble virgin and pupil of Paul the Apostle. According to later legend not in the Acts, Thecla was being pursued by soldiers of her father to capture her because of her Christian faith. She came upon a mountain, and after praying, the mountain split open and let her escape through. The town gets its name from this gap or entrance in the mountain. However, there are many variations to this story among the residents of Maaloula.

=== Other monasteries ===
There are also the remains of numerous monasteries, convents, churches, shrines and sanctuaries. There are some that lie in ruins, while others continue to stand, defying age. Many pilgrims come to Maaloula, both Muslim and Christian, and they go there to gain blessings and make offerings.

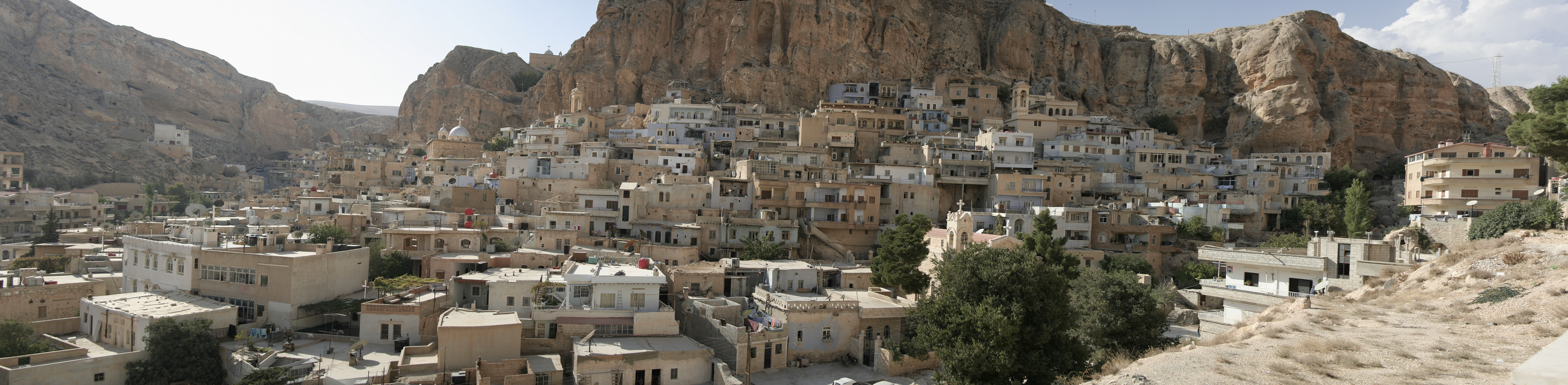
View over the town of Maaloula from East to West (2007)

=== Virgin Mary statue ===
External image
- image of Lady of Peace statue

The people of Maaloula celebrated as a new statue of Mary, mother of Jesus was erected in its centre, replacing the figure destroyed in Islamist attacks in 2013. On 13 June 2015, Syrian officials unveiled the new statue of the Virgin Mary, draped in a white robe topped with a blue shawl, her hands lifted in prayer. The fibreglass figure stood at just over 3 metres (10 feet) tall and was placed on the base of the original statue.

The statue is titled "Lady of Peace" (Arabic: سيدة السلام, romanized: sayyidat as-salām).

== Climate ==
Climate data for Maaloula
Month	Jan	Feb	Mar	Apr	May	Jun	Jul	Aug	Sep	Oct	Nov	Dec	Year
Mean daily maximum °C (°F)	7.1 (44.8)	8.0 (46.4)	11.7 (53.1)	16.3 (61.3)	21.6 (70.9)	26.0 (78.8)	28.5 (83.3)	28.7 (83.7)	25.8 (78.4)	20.8 (69.4)	12.9 (55.2)	8.7 (47.7)	18.0 (64.4)
Daily mean °C (°F)	2.7 (36.9)	3.3 (37.9)	6.3 (43.3)	10.4 (50.7)	14.8 (58.6)	18.9 (66.0)	20.9 (69.6)	21.3 (70.3)	18.4 (65.1)	14.2 (57.6)	8.2 (46.8)	4.3 (39.7)	12.0 (53.5)
Mean daily minimum °C (°F)	−1.8 (28.8)	−1.4 (29.5)	0.8 (33.4)	4.5 (40.1)	8.0 (46.4)	11.7 (53.1)	13.3 (55.9)	13.8 (56.8)	11.0 (51.8)	7.5 (45.5)	3.5 (38.3)	−0.1 (31.8)	5.9 (42.6)
Average precipitation mm (inches)	46 (1.8)	38 (1.5)	22 (0.9)	16 (0.6)	14 (0.6)	0 (0)	0 (0)	0 (0)	2 (0.1)	16 (0.6)	30 (1.2)	45 (1.8)	229 (9.1)
Source: Climate-data.com

== Sister city ==
- Béziers, France (2014)

== See also ==
- Western Neo-Aramaic
- Battle of Maaloula

== Bibliography ==
- Robinson, E.; Smith, E. (1841). Biblical Researches in Palestine, Mount Sinai and Arabia Petraea: A Journal of Travels in the year 1838. Vol. 3. Boston: Crocker & Brewster.
- Wehbi, Rimon (2017). Die aramäischen Wassermühlen in Maalula. Heidelberg: Heidelberg University.
- Wehbi, Rimon (2021). "Zwei neuwestaramäische Texte über die Wassermühlen in Maalula (Syrien)". Mediterranean Language Review (in German). 28 (1). Wiesbaden: Harrassowitz Verlag: 135–153. doi:10.13173/MLR.28.1.135.
