= Galilean dialect =

Jewish Aramaic dialect spoken during the late Second Temple period

- Region: Galilee
- Ethnicity: Galileans
- Era: Second Temple period
- Language family: Afro-Asiatic: Semitic; West Semitic; Central Semitic; Northwest Semitic; Aramoid?; Aramaic; Western; Jewish Palestinian Aramaic; Galilean dialect
- Writing system: Aramaic alphabet

Language codes
- ISO 639-3: –
- IETF: jpa-u-sd-ilz
- The Galilee region

The Galilean dialect was the form of Jewish Palestinian Aramaic spoken by people in Galilee during the Classical period, for example at the time of Jesus and the disciples, as distinct from the Judean dialect spoken in Jerusalem.

The Aramaic of Jesus, as recorded in the Gospels, gives various examples of Aramaic phrases. The New Testament notes that the pronunciation of Peter gave him away as a Galilean to the servant girl at the brazier the night of Jesus' trial (see Matthew 26:73 and Mark 14:70).

== Scholarly reconstruction ==
=== Classical scholarship ===
In the 17th and 18th centuries, John Lightfoot and Johann Christian Schöttgen identified and commented on the Galilean Aramaic speech. Schöttgen's work Horae Ebraicae et Talmudicae, which studied the New Testament in the context of the Talmud, followed that of Lightfoot. Both scholars provided examples of differences between Galilean and Judean speech.

The 19th century grammarian Gustaf Dalman identified "Galilean Aramaic” in the grammar of the Palestinian Talmud and Midrash, but he was doubted by Theodor Zahn, who raised issues with using the grammar of writings from the 4th–7th centuries to reconstruct the Galilean Aramaic of the 1st century.

=== Modern scholarship ===
Porter (2000) notes that scholars have tended to be "vague" in describing exactly what a "Galilean dialect" entailed. Hoehner (1983) notes that the Talmud has one place (Ber. 53b) with several amusing stories about Galilean dialect that indicate only a defective pronunciation of gutturals in the 3rd and 4th centuries. Hugo Odeberg attempted a grammar based on the Aramaic of the Genesis Rabbah in 1939. Michael Sokoloff's English preface to Caspar Levias's 1986 A Grammar of Galilean Aramaic (in Hebrew) also sheds light on the controversy that began with Dalman. E. Y. Kutscher's 1976 Studies in Galilean Aramaic may offer some newer insights. More recently, attempts at better understanding the Galilean dialect in the New Testament have been taken up by Steve Caruso, who has spent over 10 years compiling a topical lexical reference of the Galilean dialect. Caruso has noted the difficulties of the task:

Galilean has proven to be one of the more obscure and misunderstood dialects due to systemic – albeit well-intentioned – corruption to its corpus over the centuries, involving the layering of Eastern scribal “corrections” away from genuine Western dialect features. To this day there is no easily accessible grammar or fully articulated syntax, and due to the academic predisposition towards viewing Aramaic languages through an Eastern Aramaic lens, assessing vocabulary with appropriate orthographical and dialectical considerations has proven difficult.

Caruso has since published a nearly complete grammar in English.

== Personal names ==
Evidence on possible shortening or changing of Hebrew names into Galilean is limited. Ossuary inscriptions invariably show full Hebrew name forms. David Flusser suggested that the short name Yeshu for Jesus in the Talmud was 'almost certainly' a dialect form of Yeshua, based on the swallowing of the ayin noted by Paul Billerbeck; other scholars follow the traditional understanding of the name as a polemical reduction.
