= Al-Sarkha (Bakhah) =

Al-Sarkha ܒܟܥܐ - בכעא الصرخة, بخعة
- Depopulated village
- Location in Syria
- Coordinates: 33°53′4″N 36°33′46″E
- Country: Syria
- Governorate: Rif Dimashq Governorate
- District: Yabroud District
- Nahiyah: Yabroud

Population (2025)
  - Total: 0
- Time zone: UTC+2 (EET)
  - Summer (DST): UTC+3 (EEST)

Al-Sarkha, Bakh'ah or Bakh'a (Western Neo-Aramaic: ܒܟܥܐ - בכעא lit. 'to cry or to weep', Arabic: الصرخة or بخعة) is a depopulated Syrian village in the Yabroud District of the Rif Dimashq Governorate. According to the Syria Central Bureau of Statistics (CBS), Al-Sarkha had a population of 1,405 in the 2004 census. The village, inhabited by Sunni Muslims of Aramean descent, was vastly damaged during the Syrian Civil War, and all of the inhabitants fled to other parts of Syria or to Lebanon as refugees. As of 1 February 2025, the village is still completely uninhabited. It was one of the only three remaining villages where Western Neo-Aramaic is spoken, alongside Maaloula and Jubb'adin.

Following their conversion to Islam in the 18th century, the inhabitants of Bakh'a underwent a religious transformation, shifting from being exclusively Christian to entirely Muslim.

== Demographics ==
In 1838, American missionary and scholar Eli Smith noted Al-Sarkha as being populated by Sunni Muslims and Antiochian Greek Christians.

In 2004, according to the Syrian Central Bureau of Statistics census, the village had 1,405 inhabitants.

In March 2014, all of the village's residents were displaced to Lebanon and other parts of Syria as refugees due to the destruction during the Syrian Civil War.

As of 1 February 2025, the village remains uninhabited.

== See also ==
- Western Neo-Aramaic

== Bibliography ==
- Robinson, E.; Smith, E. (1841). Biblical Researches in Palestine, Mount Sinai and Arabia Petraea: A Journal of Travels in the year 1838. Vol. 3. Boston: Crocker & Brewster.
