= Western Neo-Aramaic =

Modern Western Aramaic language

- ܣܪܝܘܢ (ܐܰܪܳܡܰܝ) siryōn (arōmay)
- Pronunciation: [sirˈjo:n]
- Native to: Syria
- Region: Maaloula, Bakhʽa and Jubb'adin villages, Qalamoun Mountains, Damascus
- Ethnicity: Aramean (Syriac)
- Native speakers: 30,000 (2023)
- Language family: Afro-Asiatic: Semitic; West Semitic; Central Semitic; Northwest Semitic; Aramaic; Western; Damascene Aramaic; Western Neo-Aramaic
- Early forms: Proto-Afroasiatic: Proto-Semitic; Old Aramaic; Middle Aramaic; Western Middle Aramaic
- Dialects: Maalouli, Bakh'a, Jubb'adin
- Writing system: Maalouli square script (Note: It is a modified version of the Hebrew alphabet since 2006, but its usage is declining.); Syriac alphabet (Serṭā); Phoenician alphabet (Note: Since 2016, a rarely utilized, slightly modified version of the Old Phoenician alphabet has been used for Western Neo-Aramaic.); Arabic alphabet

Language codes
- ISO 639-3: amw
- Glottolog: west2763
- ELP: Western Neo-Aramaic

Western Neo-Aramaic (ܐܰܪܳܡܰܝ, arōmay, "Aramaic"), also referred to as Siryon (ܣܪܝܘܢ, siryōn, "Syriac"), is a modern variety of the Western Aramaic branch consisting of three closely related dialects. Today, it is spoken by Christian and Muslim Arameans (Syriacs) in only two villages— Maaloula and Jubb'adin (and until recently, Bakhʽa)—in the Anti-Lebanon Mountains of western Syria. Bakhʽa was vastly destroyed during the Syrian civil war and most of the community fled to other parts of Syria or Lebanon. Western Neo-Aramaic is believed to be the closest living language to the language of Jesus, whose first language, according to scholarly consensus, was Galilean Aramaic belonging to the Western branch as well; all other remaining Neo-Aramaic languages are Eastern Aramaic.

== Distribution and history ==
Western Neo-Aramaic is the sole surviving remnant of the once extensive Western Aramaic-speaking area, which also included the Palestine region and Lebanon in the 7th century. It is now spoken exclusively by the inhabitants of Maaloula and Jubb'adin, about 60 kilometres (37 mi) northeast of Damascus. The continuation of this little cluster of Aramaic in a sea of Arabic is partly due to the relative isolation of the villages and their close-knit Christian and Muslim communities.

Following the Muslim conquest of the Levant, there was a linguistic shift to Arabic for local Muslims and later for remaining Christians; Arabic displaced various Aramaic dialects, including Western Aramaic varieties, as the first language of the majority. Despite this, Western Aramaic appears to have survived for a relatively long time at least in some remote mountain villages in Lebanon and Anti-Lebanon. In fact, up until the 17th century, travelers in Lebanon still reported on several Aramaic-speaking villages. The villages of Deir Atiyah and Sadad were reported to have spoken Aramaic in the 1830s, and Ain al-Tinah likewise in the 1860s. The Austrian orientalist Alfred von Kremer claimed it was spoken in Qaryatayn ("Kurietein") in 1850, but the veracity of this account is questionable.

The dialect of Bakhʽa was the most conservative. Arabic less influenced it than the other dialects and retains some vocabulary that is obsolete in other dialects. The dialect of Jubb'adin changed the most. Arabic heavily influenced it and has a more developed phonology. The dialect of Maaloula is somewhere in between the two, but closer to that of Jubb'adin.

The cross-linguistic influence between Aramaic and Arabic has been mutual, as Syrian Arabic itself (and Levantine Arabic in general) retains an Aramaic substratum. Similar to the Eastern Neo-Aramaic languages, Western Neo-Aramaic uses Kurdish loanwords unlike other Western Aramaic dialects, e. g. in their negation structure: "Čū ndōmex", meaning "I do not sleep" in the Maalouli dialect. These influences might indicate an older historical connection between Western Neo-Aramaic and Eastern Aramaic speakers. Other strong linguistic influences on Western Neo-Aramaic include Akkadian during the Neo-Babylonian period, e. g. the names of the months: āšbaṭ (Akk. šabāṭu, "February"), ōḏar (Akk. ad(d)aru, "March"), iyyar (Akk. ayyaru, "May") or agricultural terms such as nīra (Akk. nīru, "yoke"), sekkṯa (Akk. sikkatu, "plowshare"), senta (Akk. sendu, "to grind") or nbūba (Akk. enbūbu, "fruit").

As in most of the Levant before the introduction of Islam in the seventh century, the three villages were originally all Christian until the 18th century. Maaloula is the only village that retains a sizeable Melkite Christian population belonging to the Greek Orthodox Patriarchate of Antioch and Melkite Greek Catholic Church; the inhabitants of Bakhʽa and Jubb’adin converted to Islam over the generations. However, the first Muslims were not native converts, but Arab families from Homs who were settled in the villages during the Ottoman era to monitor the Christian population. Maaloula glows in the pale blue wash with which houses are painted every year in honor of Mary, mother of Jesus.

Historical accounts, as documented by the French linguist Jean Parisot in 1898, suggest that the people of Maaloula and nearby areas claim to be descendants of migrants from the Sinjar region (modern Iraq). According to their oral traditions, their ancestors embarked on a substantial migration in ancient times, driven by the challenges posed by the Muslim occupation of the northern part of Mesopotamia. Seeking refuge, they crossed the Euphrates and traversed the Palmyrene desert, eventually finding a lasting sanctuary among Western Aramaic-speaking communities in the highlands of eastern Syria. (Note: The Anti-Lebanon mountains were geographically located in the eastern part of former Ottoman Syria in the year 1898, thus Jean Parisot wrote, "highlands of eastern Syria".) In Maaloula and the surrounding villages, the surname ”Sinjar“ (Aramaic:ܣܢܓܐܪ) is borne by some Christian and Muslim families.

All three remaining Western Neo-Aramaic dialects are facing critical endangerment as living languages. As with any village community in the 21st century, young residents are migrating into major cities like Damascus and Aleppo in search of better employment opportunities, thus forcing them into monolingual Arabic-speaking settings, in turn straining the opportunity to actively maintain Western Neo-Aramaic as a language of daily use. Nevertheless, the Syrian government provides support for teaching the language.

Unlike Syriac, which has a rich literary tradition, Western Neo-Aramaic was solely passed down orally for generations until 2006 and was unwritten. Since 2006, Maaloula has been home to an Aramaic language institute established by the Damascus University that teaches courses to keep the language alive. The institute's activities were suspended in 2010 amid concerns that the square Maalouli Aramaic alphabet used in the program, which was developed by the chairman of the language institute, George Rizkalla (Rezkallah), resembled the square script of the Hebrew alphabet. Consequently, all signs featuring the square Maalouli script were taken down. The program stated that they would instead use the more distinct Syriac alphabet, although use of Maalouli square script has continued to some degree. Al Jazeera Arabic also broadcast a program about Western Neo-Aramaic and the villages in which it is spoken with the square script still in use.

In December 2016, during an Aramaic Singing Festival in Maaloula, a modified version of an older style of the Aramaic alphabet closer to the Phoenician alphabet was used for Western Neo-Aramaic. This script seems to be used as a true alphabet with letters to represent both consonants and vowels instead of the traditional system of the Aramaic alphabet where it is used as an abjad. A recently published book about the Maalouli Aramaic dialect also uses this script.

Aramaic Bible Translation (ABT) has spent over a decade translating the Bible into Maalouli Western Neo-Aramaic and recording audio for Portrait of Jesus. Rinyo, the Syriac language organization, has published ABT's content, developed by Kanusoft.com. On their website, the Book of Psalms and Portrait of Jesus are available in Western Neo-Aramaic using the Syriac Serta script. Additionally, a New Testament translation into Western Neo-Aramaic was completed in 2017 and is now accessible online.

An electronic speech corpus of Maalouli Western Neo-Aramaic has been available online since 2022.

== Phonology ==
The phonology of Western Neo-Aramaic has developed quite differently from other Aramaic dialects/languages. The labial consonants of older Western Aramaic, /p/ and /f/, have been retained in Bakhʽa and Maaloula while they have mostly collapsed to /f/ in Jubb'adin under influence from Arabic. The labial consonant pair /b~v/ has collapsed to /b/ in all three villages. Amongst dental consonants, the fricatives /θ ð/ are retained while /d/ have become /ð/ in most places and /t/, while remaining a phoneme, has had its traditional position in Aramaic words replaced by /ts/ in Bakhʽa, and /tʃ/ in Maaloula and Jubb'adin. However, [ti] is the usual form for the relative particle in these two villages, with a variant [tʃi], where Bakhʽa always uses [tsi]. Among the velar consonants, the traditional voiced pair of /ɡ ɣ/ has collapsed into /ɣ/, while /ɡ/ still remains a phoneme in some words. The unvoiced velar fricative, /x/, is retained, but its plosive complement /k/, while also remaining a distinct phoneme, has in its traditional positions in Aramaic words started to undergo palatalization. In Bakhʽa, the palatalization is hardly apparent; in Maaloula, it is more obvious, and often leads to [kʲ]; in Jubb'adin, it has become /tʃ/, and has thus merged phonemically with the original positions of /t/. The original uvular plosive, /q/, has also moved forward in Western Neo-Aramaic. In Bakhʽa it has become a strongly post-velar plosive, and in Maaloula more lightly post-velar. In Jubb'adin, however, it has replaced the velar plosive, and become /k/. Its phonology is strikingly similar to Arabic both being sister Semitic languages.

=== Consonants ===
	Labial		Dental/Alveolar							Palato- alveolar		Palatal		Velar		Uvular	Pharyn- geal		Glottal
	Labial		plain				emphatic			Palato- alveolar		Palatal		Velar		Uvular	Pharyn- geal		Glottal
Nasal		m			n														
Plosive	p	b	t		d		tˤ					(kʲ)		k	ɡ	q			ʔ
Affricate					(ts)					(tʃ	dʒ)								
Fricative	f		θ	ð	s	z	ðˤ	sˤ	zˤ	ʃ	(ʒ)			x	ɣ		ħ	ʕ	h
Approximant		w			l								j						
Trill					r														

=== Vowels ===
Western Neo-Aramaic has the following set of vowels:

Vowels
	Front	Back
Close	i	u
Open-mid	e	o
Open	a	

== Alphabet ==
=== Square Maalouli alphabet ===
Square Maalouli alphabet used for Western Neo-Aramaic. Long vowels are transcribed with macrons (Āā, Ēē, Īī, Ōō, Ūū) and are written with mater lectionis + for /o/ and /u/, for /i/, which are also used at the end of a word if it ends with one of these vowels.

Maalouli letter																													
Hebrew letter	א	בּ	ב	גּ	ג	דּ	ד	ה	ו	ז	ח	ט	י	כּ ךּ	כ ך	ל	מ ם	נ ן	ס	ע	פּ ףּ	פ ף	צ ץ	ק	ר	שׁ	תּ	ת	ת
Latin letter/Transliteration	Aa, Ee, Ii, Oo, Uu; Āā, Ēē, Īī, Ōō, Ūū	Bb	Vv	Gg	Ġġ	Dd	Ḏḏ	Hh	Ww	Zz	Ḥḥ	Ṭṭ	Yy	Kk	H̱ẖ	Ll	Mm	Nn	Ss	Ҁҁ	Pp	Ff	Ṣṣ	Qq	Rr	Šš	Tt	Ṯṯ	Čč
Pronunciation	∅	/b/	/v/	/g/, /ʒ/	/ɣ/	/d/	/ð/	/h/	/w/	/z/	/ħ/	/tˤ/	/j/	/k/	/x/	/l/	/m/	/n/	/s/	/ʕ/	/p/	/f/	/sˤ/	/k/~/ḳ/	/r/	/ʃ/	/t/	/θ/	/tʃ/

=== Syriac and Arabic alphabet ===
Syriac (Serta) and Arabic alphabet used for Western Neo-Aramaic.

Syriac letter	ܐ	ܒ	ܒ݆	ܓ	ܔ	ܓ݂	ܕ	ܕ݂	ܗ	ܘ	ܙ	ܚ	ܚ݂	ܛ	ܜ	ܝ	ܟ	ܟ݂	ܠ	ܡ	ܢ	ܣ	ܥ	ܦ	ܨ	ܨ̇	ܩ	ܪ	ܫ	ܬ	ܬ݂	ܬ̤
Arabic letter	ا	ب	پ	گ	ج	غ	د	ذ	ه	و	ز	ح	خ	ط	ظ	ي	ک	خ	ل	م	ن	س	ع	ف	ص	ض	ق	ر	ش	ت	ث	چ
Pronunciation	/ʔ/, ∅	/b/	/p/	/g/	/dʒ/	/ɣ/	/d/	/ð/	/h/	/w/	/z/	/ħ/	/x/	/tˤ/	/dˤ/	/j/	/k/	/x/	/l/	/m/	/n/	/s/	/ʕ/	/f/	/sˤ/	/ðˤ/	/q/~/ḳ/	/r/	/ʃ/	/t/	/θ/	/tʃ/

Syriac letter	ܰ	ܶ	ܳ	ܺ	ܽ
Arabic letter	ـَ	ـِ	ـُ	ي	و
Pronunciation	/a/	/e/	/o/	/i/	/u/

=== Alternate Aramaic alphabet ===
Characters of the script system similar to the Old Aramaic or Phoenician alphabet used occasionally for Western Neo-Aramaic with matching transliteration. The script is used as a true alphabet with distinct letters for all phonemes including vowels instead of the traditional abjad system with plosive-fricative pairs.

Letter																														
Transliteration	b	ġ	ḏ	h	w	z	ḥ	ṭ	y	k	x	l	m	n	s	ʕ	p	f	ṣ	ḳ	r	š	t	ṯ	č	ž	ᶄ	ḏ̣	ẓ	'
Pronunciation	/b/	/ɣ/	/ð/	/h/	/w/	/z/	/ħ/	/tˤ/	/j/	/k/	/x/	/l/	/m/	/n/	/s/	/ʕ/	/p/	/f/	/sˤ/	/k/~/ḳ/	/r/	/ʃ/	/t/	/θ/	/tʃ/	/ʒ/	/kʲ/	/ðˤ/	/dˤ/	/ʔ/

Letter											
Transliteration	a	ā	e	ē	i	ī	o	ō	u	ū	ᵊ
Pronunciation	/a/	/a:/	/e/	/e:/	/i/	/i:/	/o/	/o:/	/u/	/u:/	/ə/

== Liturgical language and sample of Lord's Prayer ==
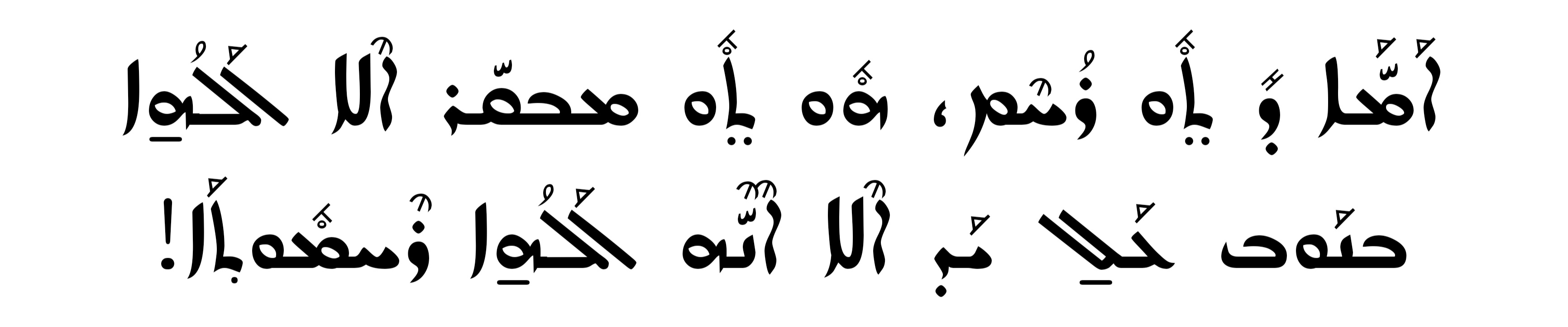
1 John 4:8 in Western Neo-Aramaic.

The Lord's Prayer in Western Neo-Aramaic, Turoyo Neo-Aramaic, Classical Syriac (Eastern accent) and Hebrew.

There are various versions of the Lord's Prayer in Western Neo-Aramaic, incorporating altered loanwords from several languages, notably Arabic: Šēḏa (from Akk. šēdu, meaning "evil" or "devil"), yiṯkan (from Ar. li-yakūn, meaning "that it may be" or "to be"), ġfurlēḥ & nġofrin (from Ar. yaghfir, meaning "to forgive"), maḥiṭ (from Ar. khaṭiʾa, meaning "to sin") and čaġribyōṯa (from Ar. jarīb or tajrība, meaning "temptation").

Several decades ago, the Christian inhabitants of Maaloula began translating Christian prayers and texts into their vernacular Aramaic dialect, given that their actual liturgical languages are Arabic and Koine Greek.

Pastor Edward Robinson reported that his companion, Eli Smith, found several manuscripts in the Syriac language in Maaloula in 1834, but no one could read or understand them. Classical Syriac, the Aramaic dialect of Edessa, was utilized as the liturgical language by local Syriac Melkite Christians following the Byzantine rite. There was a compilation of Syriac manuscripts from the monasteries and churches of Maaloula. However, a notable portion of these manuscripts met destruction upon the directives of a bishop in the 19th century.

Western Neo-Aramaic	Turoyo Neo-Aramaic	Classical Syriac (Eastern accent)	Hebrew
Ōboḥ/Ōbay/Abūnaḥ ti bišmō/bišmōya yičqattaš ešmaẖ	Abuna d-këtyo bišmayo miqadeš ešmoḵ	Aḇūn d-ḇa-šmayyāʾ neṯqaddaš šmāḵ	Avinu šebašamayim yitkadeš šimḵa
yṯēle molkaẖ/malkuṯaẖ yiṯkan ti čbaҁēleh	g-dëṯyo i malkuṯayḏoḵ howe u ṣebyonayḏoḵ	tēṯēʾ malkūṯāḵ nēhwēʾ ṣeḇyānāḵ	tavo malḵutḵa, ya'aseh retsonẖa
iẖmel bišmō/bišmōya ẖet ҁalarҁa.	ḵud d'kit bi šmayo hawḵa bi arҁo ste	ʾaykannāʾ d-ḇa-šmayyāʾ ʾāp̄ b-ʾarʿāʾ.	kevašamayim ken ba'arets.
Aplēḥ leḥmaḥ uẖẖil yōmaḥ	Haw lan u laḥmo d-sniquṯayḏan adyawma	Haḇ lan laḥmāʾ d-sūnqānan yawmānā	Et leẖem ẖukenu ten lanu hayom
ġfurlēḥ ḥṭiyōṯaḥ eẖmil	wa šbaq lan a-ḥṭohayḏan ḵud d-aḥna ste	wa-šḇōq lan ḥawbayn wa-ḥṭāhayn	uselaẖ lanu al ẖata'enu
nġofrin lti maḥiṭ ҁemmaynaḥ	sbaq lan lanek laf elan	ʾaykanāʾ d-āp̄ ḥnan šḇaqn l-ḥayāḇayn	kefi šesolẖim gam anaẖnu laẖot'im lanu
wlōfaš ttaẖlennaḥ bčaġribyōṯa	w lo maҁbret lan l'nesyuno	w-lāʾ taʿlan l-nesyōnāʾ	ve'al tavienu lide nisayon
bes ḥaslannaḥ m-šēḏa	elo mfaṣay lan mu bišo	ʾelāʾ paṣān men bīšāʾ	ki im ẖaltsenu min hara

== Miscellaneous words and sample phrases ==
English	Western Neo-Aramaic
Hello/Peace	šlōma
Altar server	šammōša
Morning	ʕṣofra/emḥar
Mountain	ṭūra
Water	mōya
God	alō (defined)/ilōha (undefined)
Sun	šimša
Mouth	femma
Head	rayša
Village	qriṯa
I swear (by the Cross)	b'sliba
Nice	ḥalya
Here/Here it is	ḥōxa/ḥōxa hū
Liar	daklōna
After	bōṯar min
Son	ebra
Daughter	berča
Brother/Brothers	ḥōna/ḥunō, ḥunū(ya)
Sister	ḥōṯa
Donkey	ḥmōra
Tongue/Language	liššōna
Money	kiršō (from Akk. "kīršu")
Nation	ōmṯa
Year	ešna
Moon	ṣahra
King	malka
Earth	arʕa
Dove	yawna
Long live!	tiḥi!
Grave	qabra
Food	xōla
(Paternal) Uncle	ḏōḏa
(Maternal) Uncle	ḥōla
(Paternal) Aunt	ʕamṯa
(Maternal) Aunt	ḥōlča
Father	ōbu
Mother	emma
My mother	emmay (lit. "my mothers", archaic phrase)
Grandfather	žetta
Grandmother	žičča
Way	tarba
Sea	yamma
Congratulations!	ibrex!
Aramean (Syriac)	sūray
Sky	šmōya/šmō
Who?	mōn?
Love	rḥmōṯa
Kiss	nōšqṯa
How are you?	ex čōb? (m)/ex čiba? (f)
Fast	ṣawma
Human	barnōša
Holy Spirit	ruḥa qutšō
Poison	samma
Sword	seyfa
Bone	ġerma
Blood	eḏma
Half	felka
Skin	ġelta
Hunger	xafna
Stone/Rock	xefa
Vineyard	xarma
Back	ḥaṣṣa
Goat	ʕezza
Lip	sefta
Chin/Beard	ḏeqna
Tooth/Crag	šenna
Past	zibnō
Queen	malkṯa
The little man	ġabrōna zʕōra
Peace to all of you	šlōma lxulḥun
Who is this?	mōn hanna? (m)/mōn hōḏ? (f)
I am Aramean (Syriac) and my language is Aramaic (Syriac)	ana sūray w liššōni siryōn
We are Arameans (Syriacs) and our language is Aramaic (Syriac)	anaḥ suroy w liššonaḥ siryōn
Church	klēsya (Greek loanword)
Shirt	qameṣča (from lat. "camisia")
What's your name? (m)	mō ušmax? (m)/mō ušmiš (f)
Dream	ḥelma
Old man	sōba

== Gallery ==
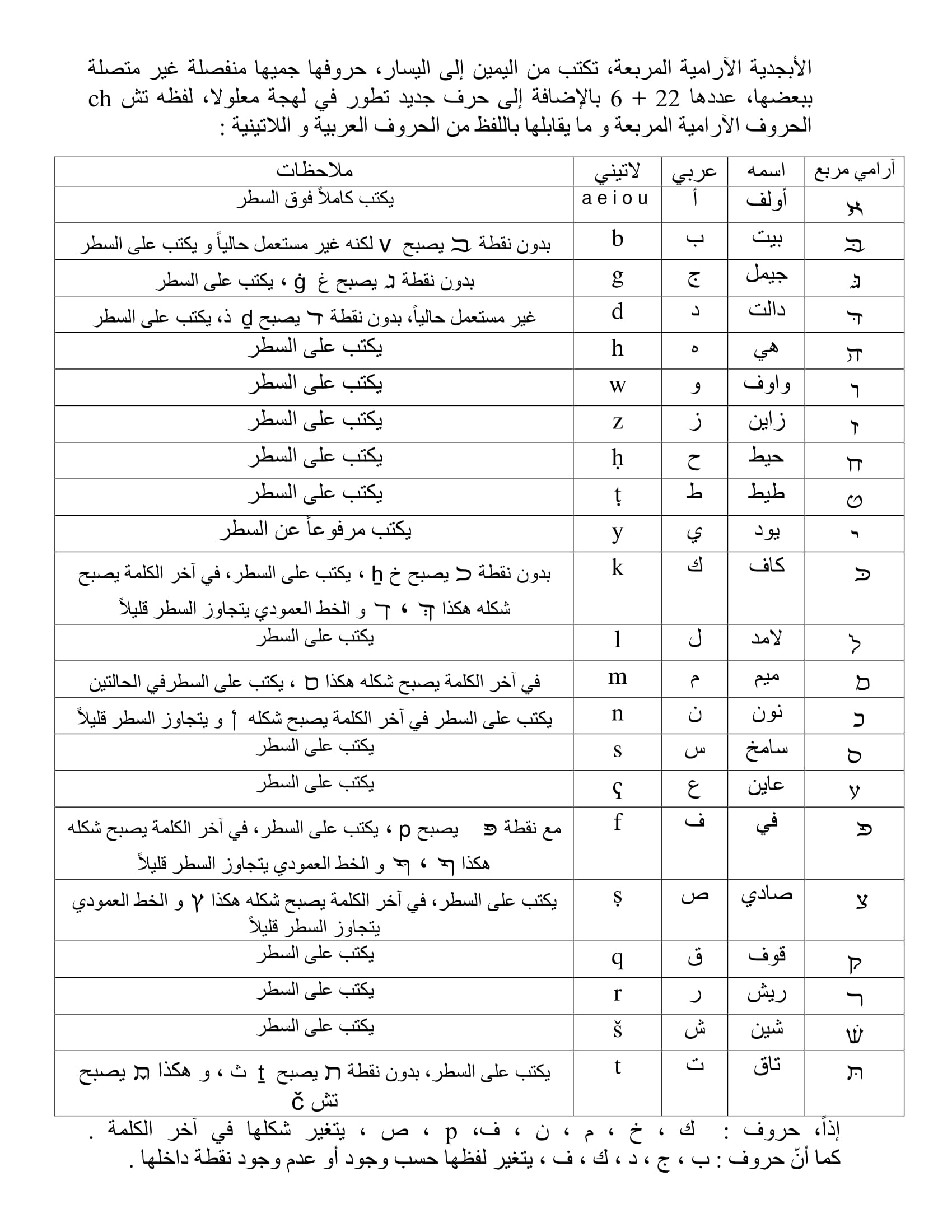

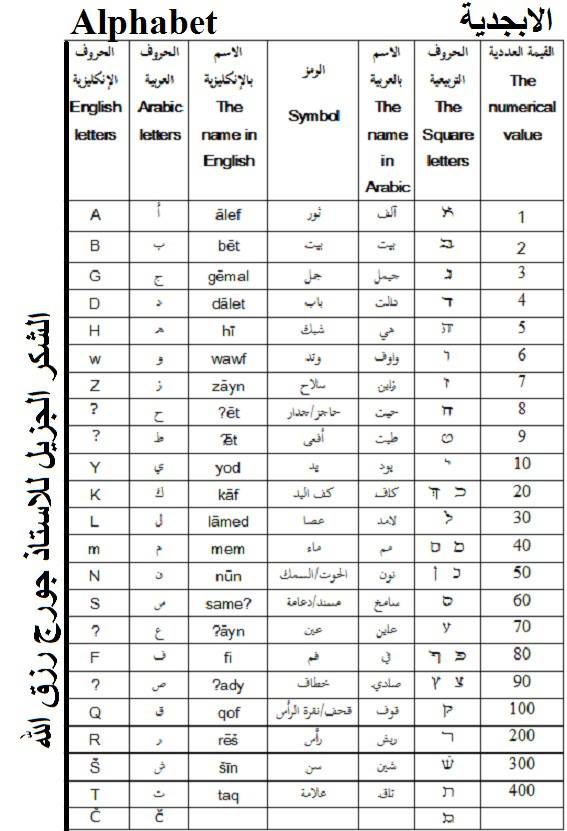

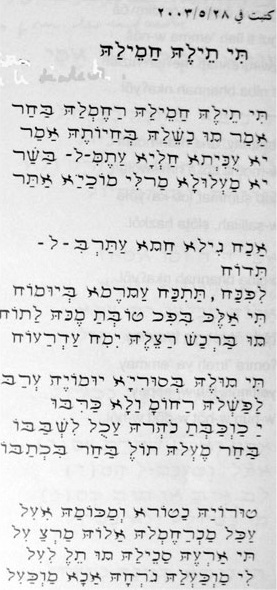

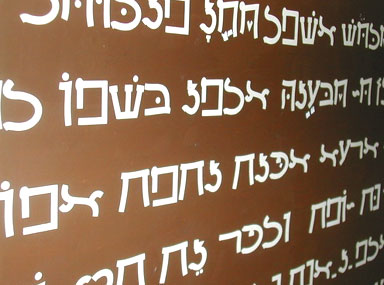

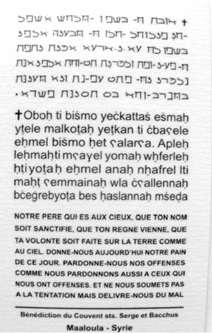

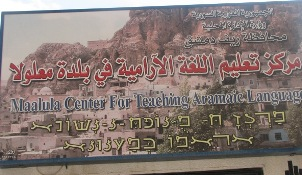

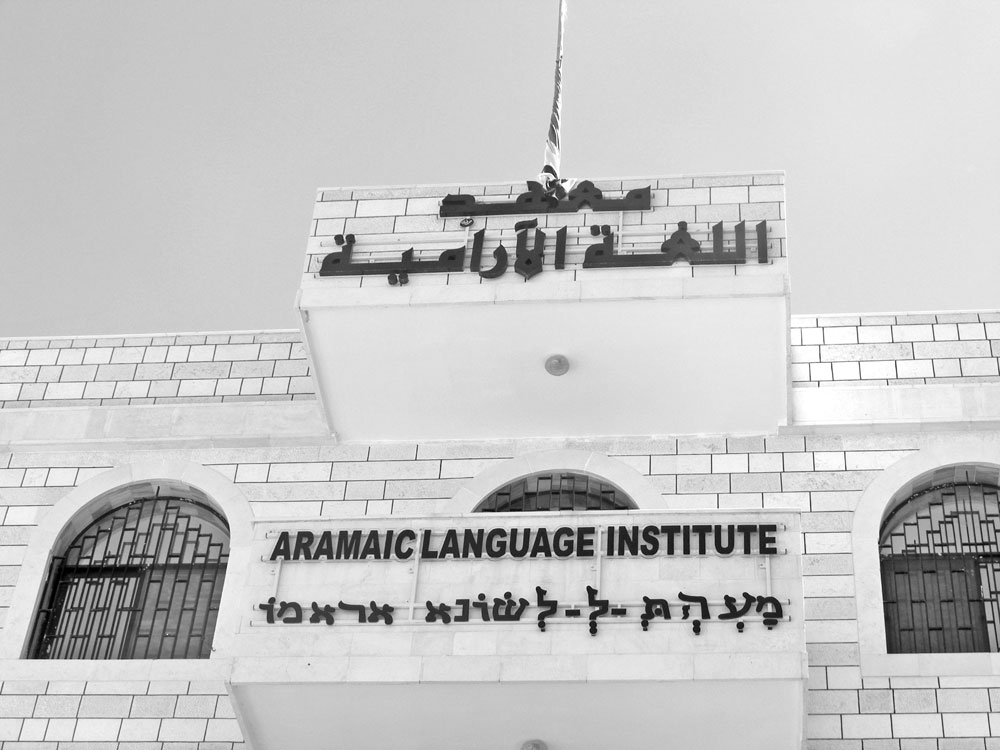

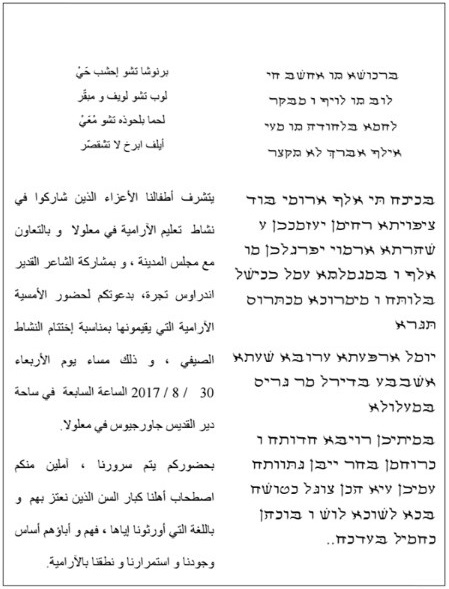

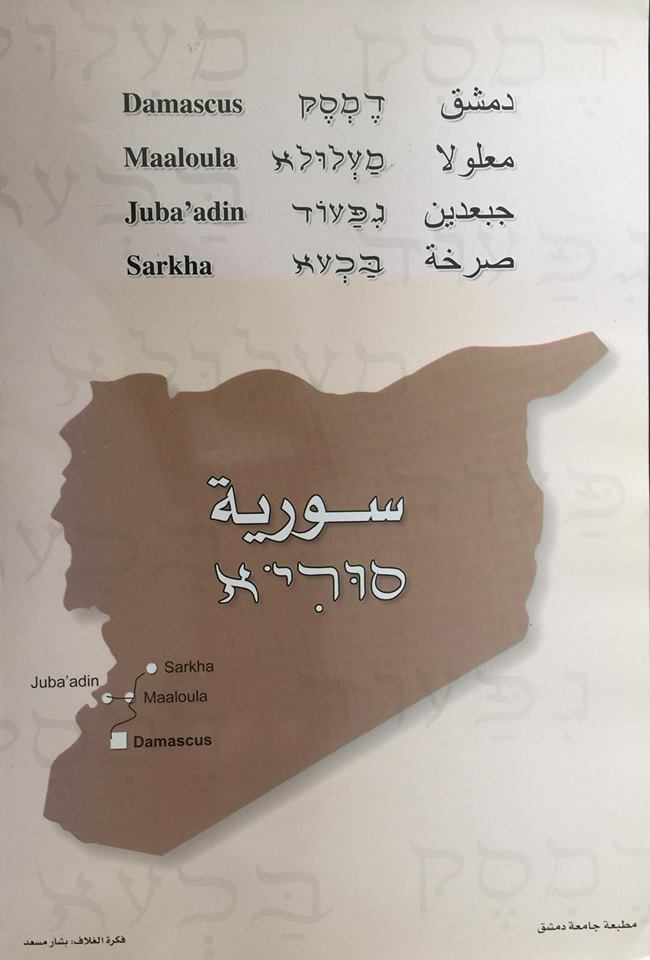

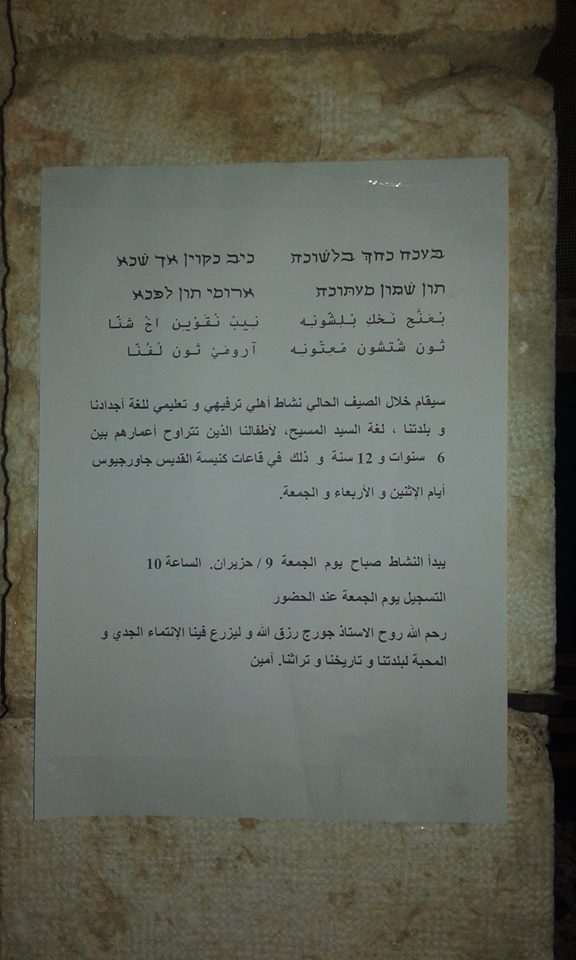

== See also ==
- Eugen Prym
- Albert Socin
- Arameans
- Aram-Damascus
- Aramaic studies
- Bible translations into Aramaic
- Neo-Aramaic languages

== Literature ==
- Arnold, Werner: Das Neuwestaramäische (Western Neo-Aramaic), 6 volumes. Harrassowitz, Wiesbaden (Semitica Viva 4),
  - Volume 1: Texte aus Baxʿa (Texts from Baxʿa), 1989, ISBN 3-447-02949-8,
  - Volume 2: Texte aus Ğubbʿadīn (Texts from Ğubbʿadīn), 1990, ISBN 3-447-03051-8,
  - Volume 3: Volkskundliche Texte aus Maʿlūla (Texts of folk tradition from Maʿlūla), 1991, ISBN 3-447-03166-2,
  - Volume 4: Orale Literatur aus Maʿlūla (Oral Literature from Maʿlūla), 1991, ISBN 3-447-03173-5,
  - Volume 5: Grammatik (Grammar), 1990, ISBN 3-447-03099-2,
  - Volume 6: Wörterbuch (Dictionary), 2019, ISBN 978-3-447-10806-5,
- Arnold, Werner. 1990. New materials on Western Neo-Aramaic. In Wolfhart Heinrichs (ed.), Studies in Neo-Aramaic, 131–149. Atlanta, Georgia: Scholars Press.
- Arnold, Werner. 2002. Neue Lieder aus Maʿlūla. In Werner Arnold & Hartmut Bobzin (eds.), „Sprich doch mit deinen Knechten aramäisch, wir verstehen es!” 60 Beiträge zur Semitistik. Festschrift für Otto Jastrow zum 60. Geburtstag., 31–52. Wiesbaden: Harrassowitz.
- Arnold, Werner: Lehrbuch des Neuwestaramäischen (A Manual to Western Neo-Aramaic), Harrassowitz, Wiesbaden 1989, ISBN 3-447-02910-2.
- Arnold, Werner. 2008. The begadkephat in Western Neo-Aramaic. In Geoffrey Khan (ed.), Neo-Aramaic dialect studies, 171–176. Piscataway, NJ: Gorgias Press. https://doi.org/10.31826/9781463211615-011.
- Arnold, Werner. 2011. Western Neo-Aramaic. In Stefan Weninger, Geoffrey Khan, Michael P. Streck & Janet C. E. Watson (eds.), The Semitic languages. An international handbook, 685–696. Berlin, Boston: De Gruyter Mouton. https://doi.org/10.1515/9783110251586.685.
- Bergsträsser, Gotthelf. 1915. Neuaramäische Märchen und andere Texte aus Maʿlūla. Leipzig: F.A. Brockhaus. https://menadoc.bibliothek.uni-halle.de/publicdomain/content/titleinfo/857071.
- Bergsträsser, Gotthelf. 1918. Neue Texte im aramäischen Dialekt von Maʿlula. In Zeitschrift für Assyriologie und verwandte Gebiete, vol. 32, 103–163. https://menadoc.bibliothek.uni-halle.de/dmg/periodical/titleinfo/118493.
- Bergsträsser, Gotthelf. 1928. Einführung in die semitischen Sprachen. Sprachproben und grammatische Skizzen. Munich: Max Hueber. https://menadoc.bibliothek.uni-halle.de/publicdomain/content/titleinfo/597992.
- Bergsträsser, Gotthelf. 1933. Phonogramme im neuaramäischen Dialekt von Malula. Satzdruck und Satzmelodie. Munich: Verlag der Bayerischen Akademie der Wissenschaften.
- Correll, Christoph. 1978. Untersuchungen zur Syntax der neuwestaramäischen Dialekte des Antilibanon: (Maʿlūla, Baḫʿa, ǦubbʿAdīn); mit besonderer Berücksichtigung der Auswirkungen arabischen Adstrateinflusses; nebst zwei Anhängen zum neuaramäischen Dialekt von ǦubbʿAdīn. (Abhandlungen Für Die Kunde Des Morgenlandes 44/4). Wiesbaden: Steiner.
- Eid, Ghattas. 2024. The Phonology of Maaloula Aramaic. Düsseldorf: Düsseldorf University Press. https://doi.org/10.1515/9783111447124.
- Eid, Ghattas & Ingo Plag. 2024. Syllable structure and syllabification in Maaloula Aramaic. Lingua 297. 1–31. https://doi.org/10.1016/j.lingua.2023.103612.
- Eid, Ghattas, Esther Seyffarth & Ingo Plag. 2022. The Maaloula Aramaic Speech Corpus (MASC): From printed material to a lemmatized and time-aligned corpus. In Proceedings of the 13th Conference on Language Resources and Evaluation (LREC 2022), 6513–6520. Marseille. http://www.lrec-conf.org/proceedings/lrec2022/pdf/2022.lrec-1.699.pdf.
- Reich, Sigismund. 1937. Études sur les villages araméens de l’Anti-Liban (Documents d’Études Orientales 7). Damascus: Institut Français de Damas.
- Spitaler, Anton. 1938. Grammatik des neuaramäischen Dialekts von Maʿlūla (Antilibanon). Leipzig: F.A. Brockhaus. http://dx.doi.org/10.25673/36802.
- Spitaler, Anton. 1957. Neue Materialien zum aramäischen Dialekt von Maʿlūla. Zeitschrift der Deutschen Morgenländischen Gesellschaft 107(2). 299–339.
- Wehbi, Rimon (2017). Die aramäischen Wassermühlen in Maalula. Heidelberg: Heidelberg University.
- Wehbi, Rimon (2021). "Zwei neuwestaramäische Texte über die Wassermühlen in Maalula (Syrien)". Mediterranean Language Review (in German). 28 (1). Wiesbaden: Harrassowitz Verlag: 135–153. doi:10.13173/MLR.28.1.135.

== Sources ==
- Arnold, Werner (1990). "New materials on Western Neo-Aramaic". Studies in Neo-Aramaic. Atlanta: Scholars Press. pp. 131–149. ISBN 9781555404307.
- Arnold, Werner (2008). "The Roots qrṭ and qrṣ in Western Neo-Aramaic". Aramaic in Its Historical and Linguistic Setting. Wiesbaden: Harrassowitz Verlag. pp. 305–311. ISBN 9783447057875.
- Arnold, Werner (2012). "Western Neo-Aramaic". The Semitic Languages: An International Handbook. Berlin-Boston: Walter de Gruyter. pp. 685–696. ISBN 9783110251586.
- Beyer, Klaus (1986). The Aramaic Language: Its Distribution and Subdivisions. Göttingen: Vandenhoeck & Ruprecht. ISBN 9783525535738.
- Brock, Sebastian P. (1989). "Three Thousand Years of Aramaic Literature". ARAM Periodical. 1 (1): 11–23.
- Khan, Geoffrey (2019). "The Neo-Aramaic Dialects and Their Historical Background". The Syriac World. London: Routledge. pp. 266–289. ISBN 9781138899018.
- Kim, Ronald (2008). "Stammbaum or Continuum? The Subgrouping of Modern Aramaic Dialects Reconsidered". Journal of the American Oriental Society. 128 (3): 505–531.
- Weninger, Stefan (2012). "Aramaic-Arabic Language Contact". The Semitic Languages: An International Handbook. Berlin-Boston: Walter de Gruyter. pp. 747–755. ISBN 9783110251586.
- Yildiz, Efrem (2000). "The Aramaic Language and its Classification". Journal of Assyrian Academic Studies. 14 (1): 23–44.
