= Jubb'adin =

Jubb'adin ܓܦܥܘܕ - גפעוד جبعدين
- Village
- Location within Syria
- Coordinates: 33.826382°N 36.509215°E
- Country: Syria
- Governorate: Rif Dimashq
- District: al-Qutayfah
- Subdistrict: Maaloula

Population (2004 census)
  - Total: 3,778
- Time zone: UTC+2 (EET)
  - Summer (DST): UTC+3 (EEST)
- Area code: 11

Jubb'adin (Western Neo-Aramaic: ܓܦܥܘܕ - גִפַּעוֹד Ġuppaʿōḏ lit. 'the well of Eden or the well of Audius', Arabic: جبعدين) is a village in southern Syria, administratively part of the Rif Dimashq Governorate, located northeast of Damascus in the Qalamoun Mountains. Nearby localities include Saidnaya and Rankous to the southwest, Yabroud and Maaloula to the northeast, and Assal al-Ward to the northwest.

The village is among the three last remaining villages where Western Neo-Aramaic is still spoken. Most of the younger people in the village are bilingual and speak both Western Neo-Aramaic and Syrian Arabic fluently. Jubb'adin is the main source of modern poetry written in the Western Neo-Aramaic language, thanks to its many poets. The environment is colder than in most other Syrian cities and villages due to its altitude.

The main mosque in the village is called Jemʿa rāb "the Large Mosque" in Western Neo-Aramaic.

== Etymology ==
The etymology of the village's name remains controversial. It is believed to be composed of two parts. The first part is Ġuppa "well" (Western Neo-Aramaic: ܓܘܦܐ) and the second part is ʿōḏ (Western Neo-Aramaic: ܥܘܕ), which could mean 'Eden', making the name to mean "the well of Eden".

Another possibility is that it is a reference to Audius, who founded Audianism, a sect of Christians in the 4th century which were founded in Syria, in which case it would mean "the well of Audius". Another theory, though less likely, is that the word is a reference to the people of ‘Ad, who are mentioned in the Quran.

== Demographics ==
According to the Syria Central Bureau of Statistics, Jubb'adin had a population of 3,778 in the 2004 census. In 2019, it was estimated that the population was somewhere between 8,000 and 10,000. The village remained under the control of the Assad regime during the Syrian Civil War, though it was subject to several minor attacks. At least 103 residents are believed to have died throughout the course of the conflict, the vast majority of whom were combatants. Somewhere between 60 and 70 men died fighting in the Syrian army or National Defense militia, while an additional 28 died fighting for various rebel groups.

The village's inhabitants are all Sunni Muslims by religion and of Aramean (Syriac) descent. Following their conversion to Islam in the 18th century, the inhabitants of Jubb'adin underwent a religious transformation, shifting from being exclusively Christian to entirely Muslim.

== History ==
In 1838, Eli Smith noted Jubb'Adin as being populated by Sunni Muslims.

== See also ==
- Western Neo-Aramaic
