= Qalamoun Mountains =

Mountains in Syria

Coordinates: 34°0′5.7″N 36°49′21.4″E

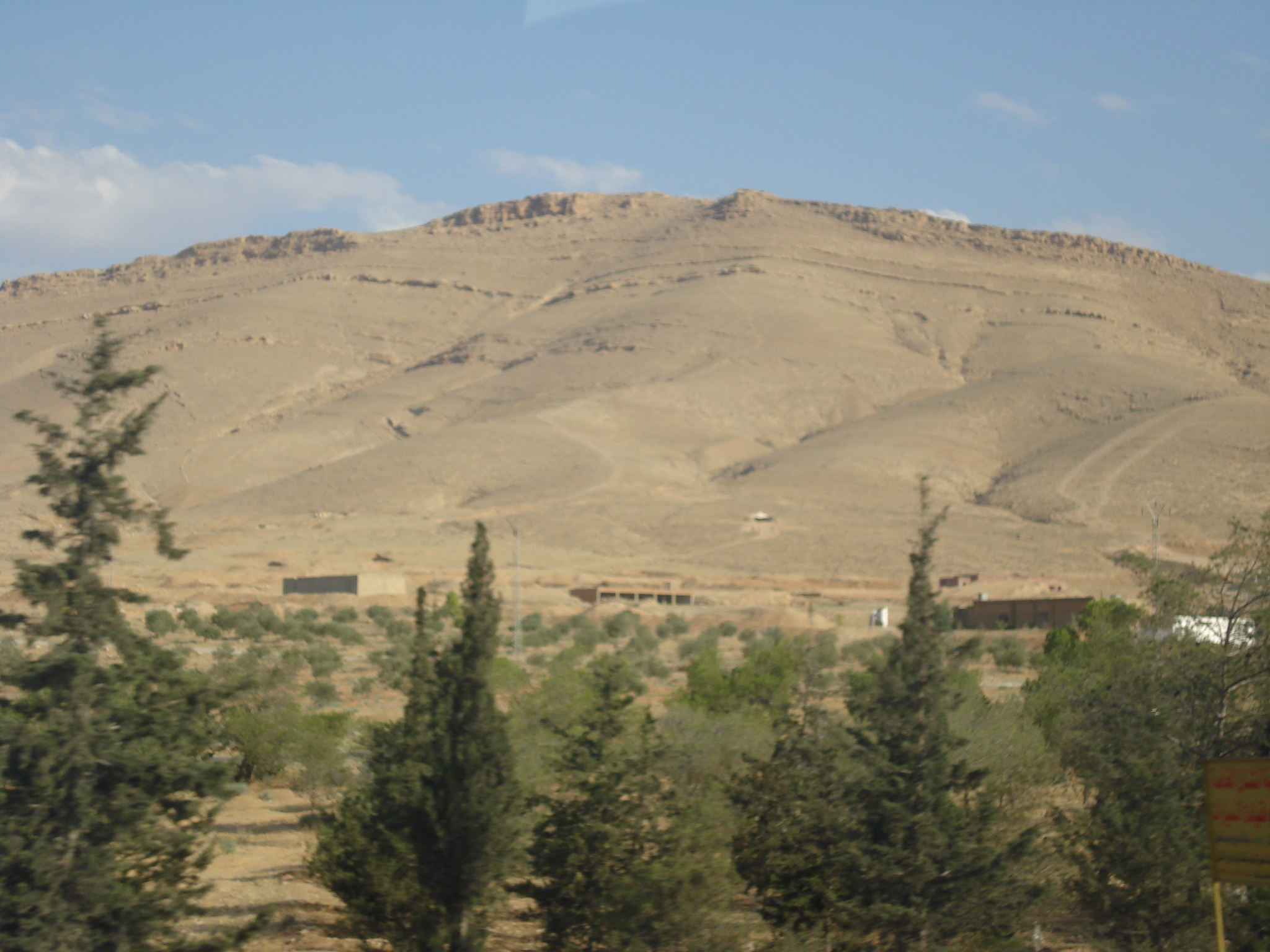
The Qalamoun Mountains

The Qalamoun Mountains (Arabic: جبال القلمون, romanized: Jabāl al-Qalamūn) are the northeastern portion of the Anti-Lebanon Mountains, and they are northeast of the Syrian capital Damascus. They run from Barada River Valley in the southwest to the city of Hisyah in the northeast.

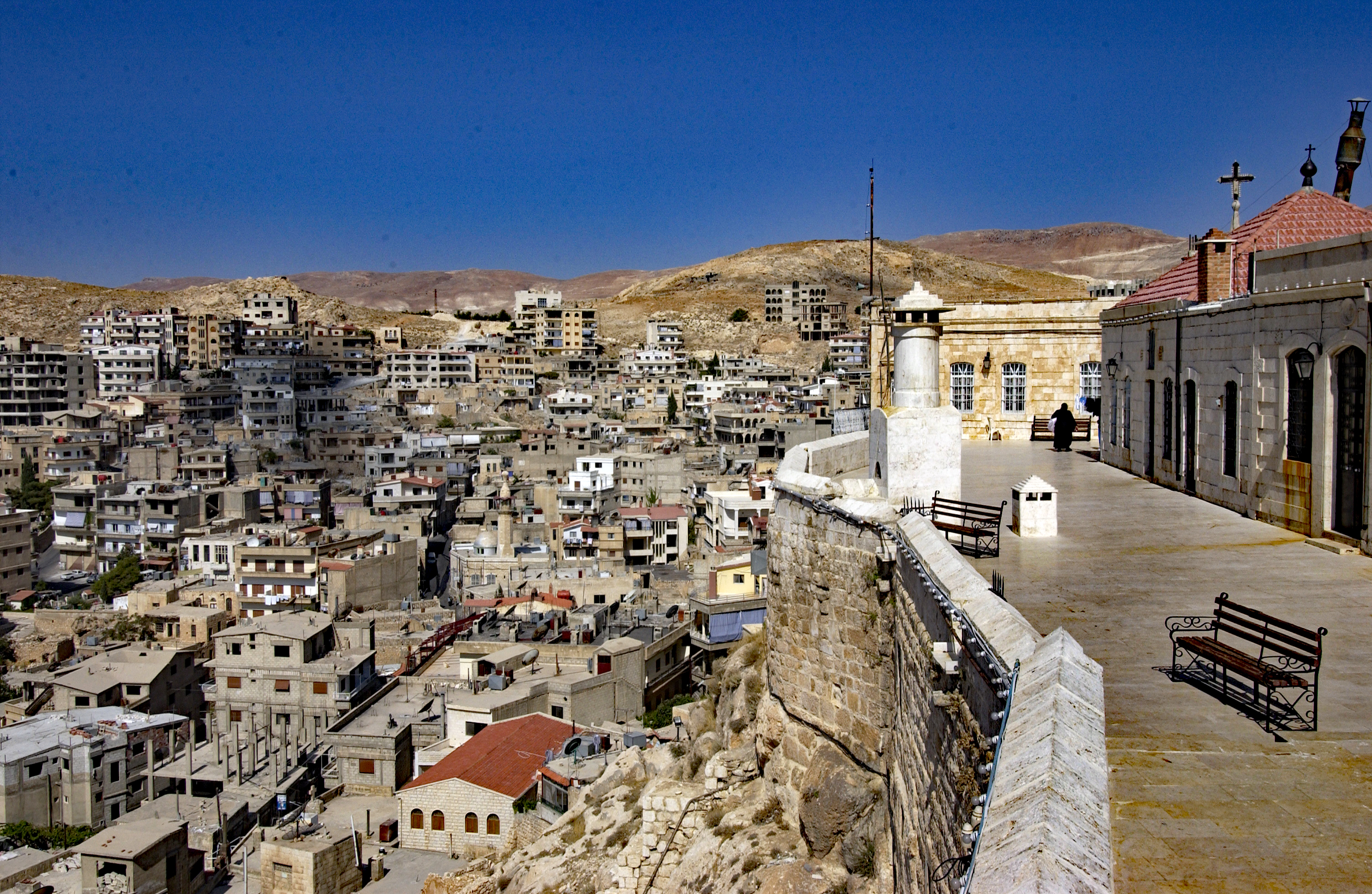
Overview of Saidnaya

== Western Qalamoun ==
The Qalamoun Mountains are home to many cities such as:

- Homs District
  - Bureij
  - Hisyah
- Al-Tall District
  - Al-Tall
  - al-Dreij
  - Halboun
  - Maaraba
  - Maarat Saidnaya
  - Maarounah
  - Manin
  - Rankous
  - Saidnaya
  - Talfita
- Yabroud District
  - Yabroud
  - Assal al-Ward
  - Bakhah
  - Ras al-Maara
- An-Nabek District
  - al-Jarajir
  - Al-Nabek
  - Deir Atiyah
  - Flita
  - Qara
  - al-Qastal
  - Al-Sahel
- Al-Qutayfah District
  - Ain al-Tinah
  - Jubb'adin
  - Maaloula

The peak of the Qalamoun Mountains host the Cherubim Monastery at Saidnaya.

== Eastern Qalamoun ==
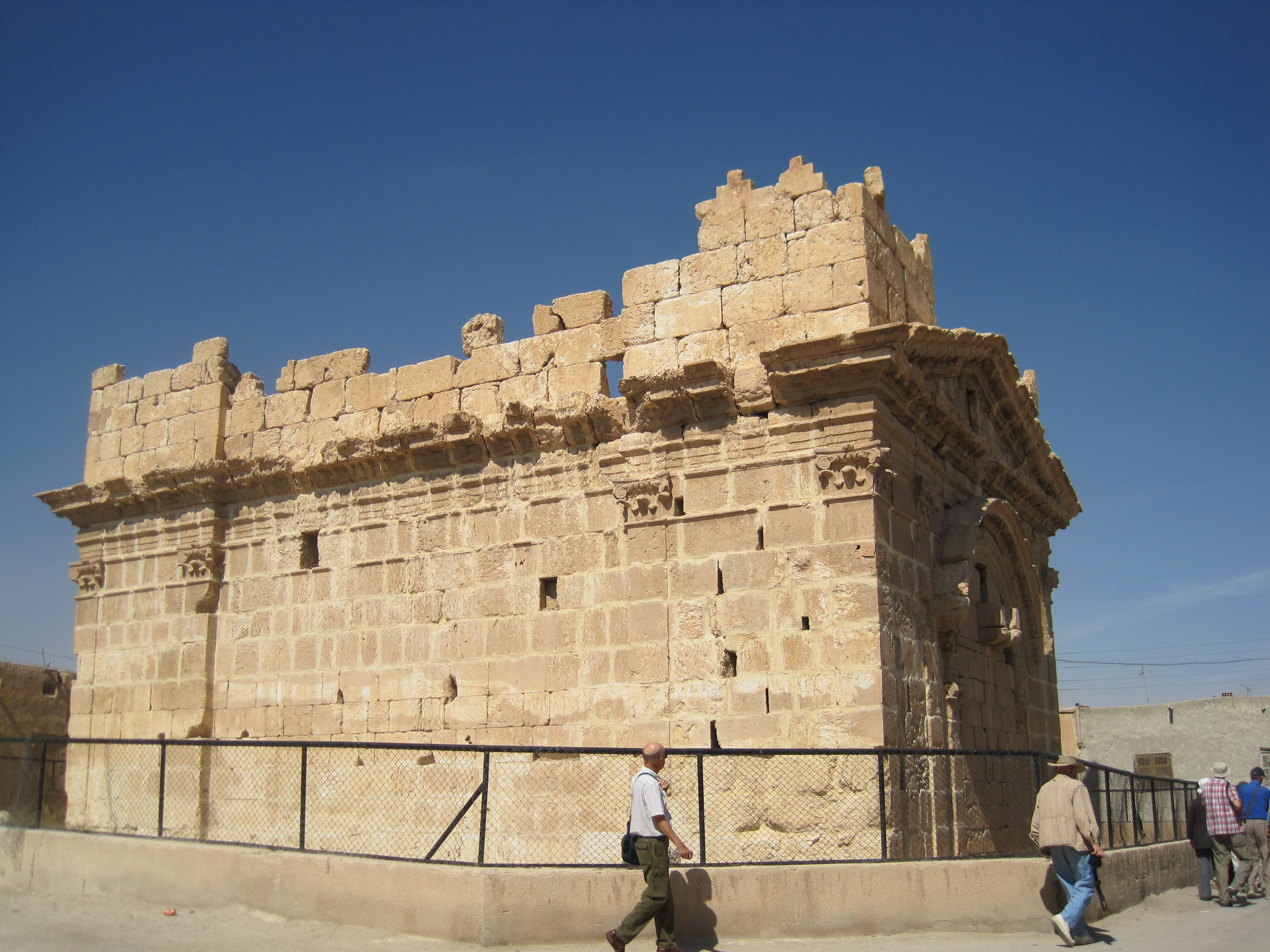
Temple of Zeus Hypsistos, al-Dumayr

Some of the cities located on the eastern part are:

- Al-Qutayfah District
  - al-Naseriyah
  - Al-Qutayfah
  - Al-Ruhaybah
  - Jayrud
  - Muadamiyat al-Qalamoun
- Douma District
  - al-Dumayr

== See also ==
- Battle of Qalamoun (2013)
- Qalamoun offensive (June–August 2014)
- Qalamoun offensive (May–June 2015)
- Qalamoun offensive (July–August 2017)
- Evacuation of rebels from eastern Qalamoun
