= Syrian Arabic =

Arabic varieties spoken in Syria

- Native to: Syria (region)
- Ethnicity: Syrians
- Native speakers: L1: 20 million (2024); L2: 2.0 million (2024); Total: 22 million (2024)
- Language family: Afro-Asiatic: Semitic; West Semitic; Central Semitic; Arabic; Syrian Arabic
- Writing system: Arabic alphabet Arabic chat alphabet

Language codes
- ISO 639-3: (covered by apc)
- IETF: apc-SY

Syrian Arabic refers to any of the Arabic varieties spoken in Syria, or specifically to Levantine Arabic.

== Aleppo, Idlib, and Coastal dialects ==
=== Aleppo and surroundings ===
Characterized by the imperfect with a-: ašṛab ‘I drink’, ašūf ‘I see’, and by a pronounced ʾimāla of the type sēfaṛ/ysēfer, with subdialects:

1. Muslim Aleppine
2. Christian Aleppine
3. Rural dialects similar to Muslim Aleppine
4. Mountain dialects
5. Rural dialects
6. Bēbi (əlBāb)
7. Mixed dialects

=== Idlib and surroundings ===
These dialects are transitional between the Aleppine and the Coastal and Central dialects. They are characterized by *q > ʔ, ʾimāla of the type sāfaṛ/ysēfer and ṣālaḥ/yṣēliḥ, diphthongs in every position, a- elision (katab+t > ktabt, but katab+it > katabit), išṛab type perfect, ʾimāla in reflexes of *CāʔiC, and vocabulary such as zbandūn "plow sole".

=== Coast and coastal mountains ===
These dialects are characterized by diphthongs only in open syllables: bēt/bayti ‘house/my house’, ṣōt/ṣawti ‘voice/my voice’, but ā is found in many lexemes for both *ay and *aw (sāf, yām). There is pronounced ʾimāla. Unstressed a is elided or raised to i and u whenever possible: katab+t > ktabt, katab+it > katbit, sallam+it > sallmit, sallam+t > sillamt, ḥaṭṭ+ayt > ḥiṭṭayt, trawwaq+t > truwwaqt, *madrasa > madrsa > mádǝrsa ~ madírsi, *fallāḥ > fillāḥ. The feminine plural demonstrative pronoun is hawdi, or haydi. It can be divided into several subdialects:

1. Transitional between Idlib and the northern coastal dialects
2. Northern coastal dialects (Swaydīye)
3. Northern coastal dialects
4. Latakia
5. Central coastal dialects
6. Mḥardi
7. Banyās
8. Southern coastal dialects
9. Tartūs, Arwad
10. Alawite and Ismaelite dialects

== Central dialects ==
In this area, predominantly *ay, aw > ē, ō. Mostly, there is no ʾimāla, and a-elision is only weakly developed. Word-final *-a > -i operates. Several dialects exist in this area:

=== Central-North ===
Leans toward the Idlib and Coastal dialects. Preservation of *q, 2nd masc. inti, 2nd fem. inte, feminine forms in the plural intni katabtni, hinni(n) katabni.

=== Tayybet əlʔImām / Sōrān ===
Preservation of interdentals. 2/3 pl. masc. ending -a: fatahta, falaha, tuktúba, yuktúba. 2nd plural m/f inta - intni. 3rd plural m/f hinhan - hinhin. The perfect of the primae alif verbs are ake, axe. In the imperfect, yāka, yāxa. The participle is mēke.

=== Hama ===
Characterized by *q > ʔ; preservation of *ǧ; six short vowels: a, ǝ, e, i, o, u, and six long vowels: ā, ǟ, ē, ī, ō, ū.

=== Central-South w/ *q > q ===
Preservation of *q.

=== Central-South w/ *q > ʔ ===
Characterized by *q > ʔ.

=== Bedouin-Sedentary mixed dialect ===
Preservation of interdentals and terms like alhaz "now".

== Central Syrian dialect continuum, steppe dialects and steppe's edge ==
=== Suxni ===
Characterized by *q > k, *g > c [ts], *k > č, and ʾimāla of type *lisān > lsīn. Distinctive pronouns are 3PL.C aham and 2SG.F suffix -či. The suffix of the verbal 3SG a-Type is -at, and i-Type perfects take the form ʾílbis "he got dressed".

=== Palmyrene ===
Characterized by preserved *q, *g > č, and unconditioned ʾimāla in hēda. Distinctive pronouns are 3PL ahu - hinna, and 2SG.F suffix -ki. The suffix of the verbal 3SG a-Type is -at, and i-Type perfects take the form ʾílbis "he got dressed".

=== Qarawi ===
Characterized by preserved *q and unconditioned ʾimāla in hēda. Distinctive pronouns are 3PL hunni - hinni. The suffix of the verbal 3SG a-Type is -at, and i-Type perfects take the form lbīs "he got dressed".

=== Saddi ===
Characterized by preserved *q and pronouns 3PL hūwun - hīyin. The suffix of the verbal 3SG a-Type is -at.

=== Rastan ===
Characterized by preserved *q and the changes masaku > masakaw# and masakin > masake:n# in pause. Distinctive pronouns are 3PL.C hinne, and the suffix of the verbal 3SG a-Type is -at.

=== Nabki ===
Characterized by *q > ʔ, and *ay, *aw > ā. The shifts *CaCC > CiCC/CuCC and *CaCaC > CaCōC take place. The ʾimāla is of the i-umlaut type. Distinctive pronouns are 2SG.F suffix -ke. The a-Type perfects take the form ḍarōb and the i-type lbēs. The suffix of the verbal 3SG a-Type is -et, with allophony ḍarbet - ḍárbatu.

=== Eastern Qalamūn ===
Characterized by *q > ʔ and ʾimāla of the i-umlaut type. Distinctive pronouns are 3SG.M suffix -a/-e. The suffix of the verbal 3SG a-Type is -at.

=== Mʿaḏ̣ḏ̣amīye ===
Characterized by *q > ʔ and unconditioned ʾimāla in hēda. Distinctive pronouns are 2SG.F suffix -ki. The 1SG perfect conjugation is of the type katabtu, similar to the qǝltu dialects of Iraq. Also like qǝltu dialects, it has lengthened forms like ṣafṛā "yellow [fem.]".

== Qalamūn ==
The Qalamūn dialects have strong links to Central Lebanese. The short vowels i/u are found in all positions. Pasual kbīr > kbeyr# and yrūḥ > yrawḥ#. The a-elision is not strongly pronounced. Shortening of unstressed long vowels is characteristic: *sakākīn > sakakīn ‘knives’, fallōḥ/fillaḥīn ‘peasant/peasants’, or fillōḥ/filliḥīn, as in Northwest Aramaic. Conservation of diphthongs and *q > ʔ are common, as well as splitting of ā into ē and ō. As for negation, the type mā- -š is already attested along with the simple negation.

=== Qara ===
No interdentals

=== Yabrūdi ===
No interdentals

=== Central Qalamūn ===
Conservation of interdentals, subdialects:

1. Ain al-Tinah
2. Central, tends to East Qalamūn
3. Rās ilMaʿarra
4. Gubbe
5. Al-Sarkha (Bakhah) (Western Neo-Aramaic is also spoken in the village)
6. Maʿlūla (Western Neo-Aramaic is also spoken in the village)
7. Jubb'adin / GubbʿAdīn (Western Neo-Aramaic is also spoken in the village)

=== Southern Qalamūn ===
Conservation of interdentals, a-elision katab+t > ktabt, distinctive pronouns are 3PL.C hunni. Subdialects are:

1. ʿAssāl ilWard, ilHawš
2. ʿAkawbar, Tawwane, Hile
3. Hafīr ilFawqa, Badda
4. Qtayfe
5. Sēdnāya
6. Maʿarrit Sēdnāya
7. Rankūs
8. Talfita
9. Halbūn
10. Hafīr itTahta
11. itTall
12. Mnin
13. Drayj

=== Northern Barada valley ===
No interdentals, conservation of diphthongs

1. Sirgāya
2. Blūdān
3. izZabadāni
4. Madāya

== Damascus and surroundings ==
=== Transitional Damascus - Qalamūn ===
These dialects have no interdentals, no diphthongs, and a reflex of *g > ž. The suffix of the verbal 3SG a-Type is -it, ḍarab+it > ḍárbit. The short vowels i/u are found in all positions. Demonstrative plural pronoun hadunke.

== Other dialects, accents, and varieties ==
=== Horan dialects ===
The Hauran area is split between Syria and Jordan and speak largely the same dialect

1. Central dialects
2. Gēdūri (transitional)
3. Mountain dialects
4. Zāwye (transitional)
5. Mixed dialect Čanāčer/Zāčye

=== Mount Hermon and Jabal al-Druze area ===
Dialects of Mount Hermon and Druze have a Lebanese origin

1. Autochthonous sedentary dialects
2. Mount Hermon dialect
3. Druze dialect

=== Sedentary East Syrian ===
==== Mesopotamian (Turkey) ====
1. Qsōrāni
2. Tall Bēdar
3. Mardilli
4. Azxēni (ǝlMālkīye)

==== Mesopotamian (Syria) ====
1. Deir ez-Zor
2. Albū Kmāl

==== Autochthonous ====
1. Xātūnī

=== Bedouin dialects ===
Shawi Arabic and Najdi Arabic are also spoken in Syria.
