= Badda =

Badda may refer to:

- Badda, Chittagong, village in Bangladesh
- Badda (Somalia), medieval settlement
- Badda, Syria, village in Dimashq Governorate
- Badda Thana, township in Dhaka district, Bangladesh
