= Guardians of the Dawn =

Syrian Christian paramilitary force

- حراس الفجر
- A promotional image for the Guardians of the Dawn, showcasing their insignia to the right. The constituent groups of the coalition also frequently use the Christian cross, the Flag of Syria and images of Bashar al-Assad as logos.
- Leader: Fadi Abd al-Massih Khouri
- Dates active: 2015 – ?
- Allegiance: Syrian Air Force Intelligence Directorate till 2024
- Groups: Lions of the Cherubim; Earthquake of Jobar; Ararat Group; Lions of the Valley; Lions of Hamidiya (former); Intervention Regiment; Lions of Dwel’a
- Headquarters: Various Christian towns throughout Syria
- Active regions: Western Syria
- Ideology: Christian solidarity Christian holy war Syrian nationalism
- Wars: the Syrian Civil War

The Guardians of the Dawn (Arabic: حراس الفجر, romanized: Ḥurrās al-Fajr) are a coalition of Christian pro-government militias which were involved in the Syrian Civil War and affiliated with the Air Force Intelligence Directorate. Although the Guardians of the Dawn, whose official motto is "A homeland that we do not protect is one we do not deserve to live in", promote themselves as a Syrian nationalist force, their fighters are primarily motivated by a concept of holy war to defend the Christian areas of Syria from hostile rebels. The militiamen of Usud al-Cherubim, one of the coalition's constituent groups, even refer to themselves as "mujahideen of the cross".

== History ==
After the onset of the Syrian Civil War in 2012, a number of militias consisting of Christians were established to fight in support of the Syrian government against the rebels. This happened because of the fact that once the rebels gained strength, they started attacking Christian places of worship and kidnapping Christians for ransom. The Syrian government was also interested in arming Christian militias, as these were generally loyal and relieved the hard-pressed Syrian Army. Christian units played a major role in the fighting for the Qalamoun Mountains 2013–14, where several important Christian centers are located, such as the towns of Maarounah and Yabroud, as well as the Cherubim Convent near Saidnaya.

According to their official leader, Fadi Abd al-Massih Khouri, the Guardians of the Dawn were established on 11 September 2015, when various Christian militias banded together to defend Maarounah from an attack by Jaysh al-Islam; as this ad-hoc alliance proved highly successful, the coalition was promptly formalized under Khouri's leadership. The idea behind its foundation was that the different Christian militias should help each other when their villages come under assault.

Initially, the new coalition was known as "Homeland Shield" ("Dir’ al-Watan"), and soon began to participate in various campaigns to defend or capture Christian localities in Syria: In late 2015 the member groups joined a government offensive in the western Homs Governorate, during which they helped to retake Sadad and Mahin from the Islamic State of Iraq and the Levant. For these operations they received the official gratitude of Sootoro. In March 2016 the alliance adopted its current name, and later that year sent fighters to the northern Hama Governorate in order to defend a number of Christian villages from a Jihadist-led rebel offensive. The Guardians also took part in the fighting for Qamhana during the Hama offensive (March–April 2017).

Besides these campaigns, the Guardians of the Dawn are also very active throughout the Rif Dimashq Governorate, taking part in various offensives against rebel-held eastern Ghouta and the Siege of Darayya and Muadamiyat; the latter operation was partly framed by Usud al-Cherubim as "liberating its [Darayya's] churches". Khouri also ran as parliamentary candidate in the elections of April 2016, though failed to win a seat.

== Constituent groups ==
- Lions of the Cherubim ("Usud al-Cherubim"): Formed in 2013 as "local 'monastery defence' force" for the Cherubim Convent near Saidnaya, the Usud al-Cherubim have become very active throughout western Syria since 2014. They claim to have participated in the various government offensives in the Qalamoun Mountains (2013, 2014, 2015), the conquest of Jobar, the battles of Eastern Ghouta, the Siege of Darayya and Muadamiyat, the Homs offensive (November–December 2015), and the Hama offensive in 2016. Furthermore, the Usud al-Cherubim were instrumental in the creation of the Guardians of the Dawn coalition. One of the unit's contingents is named "Earthquake of Jobar" ("Zilzal Jobar"). The exact size of the unit is unknown; their widespread military activity suggests that the Usud al-Cherubim can count upon a considerable number of fighters, while their very light casualties imply that their actual military strength is rather weak.
- Ararat Group
- Lions of the Valley ("Usud al-Wadi"): A self-defense group from Wadi al-Nasara, a valley whose population is almost exclusively (98%) Christian.
- Lions of Hamidiya ("Usud al-Hamidiya"): This unit, originating in the Hamidiya neighbourhood of Homs and led by Rami Marina, left the Guardians of the Dawn to join the Military Intelligence Directorate-affiliated the Desert Commandos Regiment sometime in May 2016.
- Intervention Regiment: The personal militia of Fadi Abd al-Massih Khouri, formed in September 2015.
- Lions of Dwel’a ("Usud Dwel’a"): A self-defense group from the Dwel’a neighbourhood of Damascus.

== See also ==
- List of armed groups in the Syrian Civil War
- Air Force Intelligence Directorate

== Bibliography ==
- Oehring, Otmar (2017). "Christen in Syrien: Aktuelle Lage und Perspektiven" [Christians in Syria: Current situation and perspectives] (PDF). Analysen und Argumente (in German) (237). Sankt Augustin: Konrad Adenauer Foundation.
