= Al-Tall =

Al-Tall, Al Tall, at-Tall, et-Tell etc. may refer to:

- Al-Tall, Acre, depopulated village formerly in northwestern Palestine
- Al-Tall District, a district of Syria
  - Al-Tall, Syria, the capital city of that district
- Et-Tell, West Bank, an archaeological site
- Et-Tell, presumed capital of Geshur, presumed site of Bethsaida Julias; immediately northeast of the Sea of Galilee

People named Al-Tall, Al Tall or variants:

- Abdullah el-Tell (1918–1973), Transjordanian officer, governor of Jerusalem, royal adviser
- Siraj Al Tall (born 1982), Jordanian footballer
- Wasfi al-Tal (1919–1971), former prime minister of Jordan
- Mustafa Wahbi Al Tal, (1897–1949), Jordanian poet

Other uses:

- Al Tall (band), Valencian folk music band
