= Maaraba =

Maaraba may refer to:

- Maaraba, Rif Dimashq
- Maaraba, Daraa
