= Al-Jarniyah, Rif Dimashq =

Al-Jarniyah الجرنية
- Village
- Location in Syria
- Coordinates: 33°47′0″N 36°23′35″E
- Country: Syria
- Governorate: Rif Dimashq Governorate
- District: Al-Tall District
- Nahiyah: Rankous

Population (2004 census)
  - Total: 271
- Time zone: UTC+2 (EET)
  - Summer (DST): UTC+3 (EEST)

Al-Jarniyah (Arabic: الجرنية) is a Syrian village in the Al-Tall District of the Rif Dimashq Governorate. According to the Syria Central Bureau of Statistics (CBS), Al-Jarniyah had a population of 271 in the 2004 census.
