= Mohamed Ali Abdel Jalil =

Syrian-French writer and translator (born 1973)

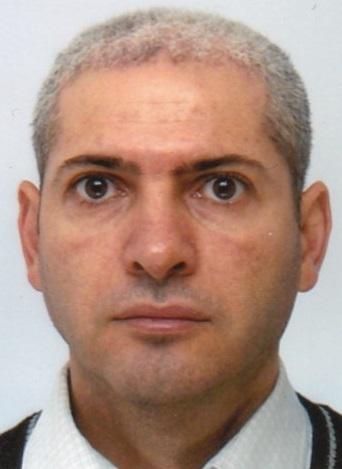
Mohamed Ali Abdel Jalil

Mohamed Ali Abdel Jalil (محمد علي عبد الجليل) is a Syrian essayist, calligraph, critic, researcher islamologist and translator. He spoke French and Arabic. He was born in Damascus in 1973 in a peasant family from Damascus Suburb (Rif Dimashq Governorate) (village: Rankous). He studied at the Damascus University. He is a member of the Maaber Committee (The magazine and Publishing houseof Maaber http://www.maaber.org/). He proposes the idea that the Qur'an is a text translated into Arabic from other dominant languages and cultures.

== Articles ==
- Athar fi al-'aqida thakhalluf wa'i al-mu'taqidiin (The impact of dogma in the regression of the consciousness of believers);
- Ibn Sina wa mas'alat at-taqammus (Avicenna and the question of reincarnation);
- Masadir al-wahm (Sources of illusion);
- Imtilak al-Hakiki (Possession of the truth);
- Influenza al-da'wa (Influenza of proselytism)
- Notes on the concept of jihad (Magazine Maaber Maaber)
- Kalaam Alllah (The Word of God)
- Haqiqat an-nabi حقيقة النبي (article)
- "وظيفة القرآن" ("The function of the Koran"): The article on SSRCAW (Secular Studies & Researches Centre in Arabic World) and the article on al-Hewar.

=== Translated works ===
- Qaamus al-la'unf (Dictionary of non-violence), Jean-Marie MULLER Jean-Marie Muller;
- Al-la'unf fi at-tarbiya (Non-violence in education), Jean-Marie Muller;
- Mukhtarat Simone Weil (Simone Weil, Anthology);
- Al-tajazzur (The Need for Roots: prelude towards a declaration of duties towards mankind), Simone Weil.
- Gandhi al-mutamarrid غاندي المتمرد
