= Akoubar =

Akoubar عكوبر
- Village
- Location in Syria
- Coordinates: 33.742389°N 36.466828°E
- Country: Syria
- Governorate: Rif Dimashq Governorate
- District: Al-Tall District
- Nahiyah: Saidnaya

Population (2004 census)
  - Total: 563
- Time zone: UTC+2 (EET)
  - Summer (DST): UTC+3 (EEST)

Akoubar (Arabic: عكوبر) is a Syrian village in the Al-Tall District of the Rif Dimashq Governorate. According to the Syria Central Bureau of Statistics (CBS), Akoubar had a population of 563 in the 2004 census. Its inhabitants are predominantly Sunni Muslims.

== Bibliography ==
- Robinson, E.; Smith, E. (1841). Biblical Researches in Palestine, Mount Sinai and Arabia Petraea: A Journal of Travels in the year 1838. Vol. 3. Boston: Crocker & Brewster.
