= Al-Mahabah =

Al-Mahabah المحبة
- Village
- Location in Syria
- Coordinates: 33.80327°N 36.43179°E
- Country: Syria
- Governorate: Rif Dimashq Governorate
- District: Al-Tall District
- Nahiyah: Rankous

Population (2004 census)
  - Total: 100
- Time zone: UTC+2 (EET)
  - Summer (DST): UTC+3 (EEST)

Al-Mahabah (Arabic: المحبة) is a Syrian village in the Al-Tall District of the Rif Dimashq Governorate. According to the Syria Central Bureau of Statistics (CBS), Al-Mahabah had a population of 100 in the 2004 census.
