= Badda, Syria =

Badda بَدَّا
- Village
- Nickname: (The Jewel of Qalamoun)
- Location in Syria
- Coordinates: 33°41′N 36°26′E
- Country: Syria
- Governorate: Rif Dimashq
- District: al-Tall
- Subdistrict: Saidnaya

Population (2004 census)
  - Total: 6,564
- Time zone: UTC+2 (EET)
  - Summer (DST): UTC+3 (EEST)

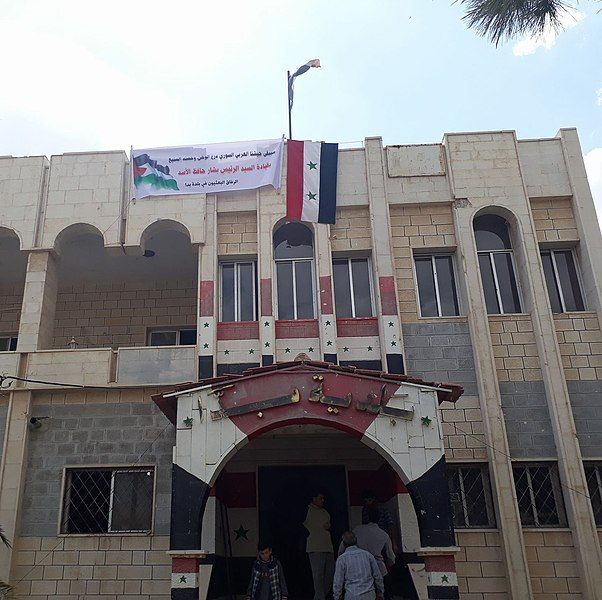
The local council in Badda town.

Badda (Arabic: بَدَّا) is a Syrian village in the Al-Tall District of the Rif Dimashq Governorate. According to the Syria Central Bureau of Statistics (CBS), Badda had a population of 6,564 in the 2004 census. Its inhabitants are predominantly Sunni Muslims.

== Bibliography ==
- Robinson, E.; Smith, E. (1841). Biblical Researches in Palestine, Mount Sinai and Arabia Petraea: A Journal of Travels in the year 1838. Vol. 3. Boston: Crocker & Brewster.
