= List of monasteries in Syria =

This is a list of monasteries in Syria.

== Catholic ==
=== Catholic ===
- St. Thomas Roman Monastery (Deir Mar Touma), Saidnaya.

=== Melkite Greek ===
- Monastery of St. James the Mutilated (Jacques le Mutilé) (Deir Mar Yakub), Qara.
- St. Sergius monastery (Mar Sarkis), Maaloula

=== Syriac Catholic ===
- Monastery of St. Moses the Abyssinian (Deir Mar Musa), Al-Nabek.
- Monastery of Saint Elian, Al-Qaryatayn (reportedly destroyed by ISIL)

== Orthodox ==
=== Coptic ===
- Avraam Monastery, Maarat Saidnaya

=== Greek ===
- Our Lady (Dormition) Convent, Baniyas
- St. George Monastery, Mahardah
- Holy Transfiguration Monastery, Kafr Ram, Homs
- St John the Baptist Monastery, Aleppo
- Our Lady of Saidnaya Monastery (Convent of Our Lady), Saidnaya, Saidnaya
- St. Elias Monastery (Deir Mar Elias), Saidnaya
- Cherubim Convent (Deir Cherubim-Shirubeim), Saidnaya
- Saint Thekla Convent (Mar Taqla), Maaloula
- Saint George Monastery, Homs

=== Syriac Orthodox ===
- St Ephrems Patriarchal Monastery, Maarat Saidnaya
- St. Estphariuos Orthodox Monastery, Saidnaya
- St. Mary's Monastery (Morth Maryam), Tel Wardiat, al-Hasakah
