= Sabnah =

Sabnah سبنة
- Village
- Location in Syria
- Coordinates: 33°48′11″N 36°16′53″E
- Country: Syria
- Governorate: Rif Dimashq Governorate
- District: Al-Tall District
- Nahiyah: Rankous

Population (2004 census)
  - Total: 94
- Time zone: UTC+2 (EET)
  - Summer (DST): UTC+3 (EEST)

Sabnah (Arabic: سبنة) is a Syrian village in the Al-Tall District of the Rif Dimashq Governorate. According to the Syria Central Bureau of Statistics (CBS), Sabnah had a population of 94 in the 2004 census.
