= Al-Tall, Syria =

City in southern Syria

Al-Tall التل Al-Tell
- Location in Syria
- Coordinates: 33°36′0″N 36°18′0″E
- Country: Syria
- Governorate: Rif Dimashq
- District: al-Tall
- Subdistrict: al-Tall
- Elevation: 1,000 m (3,300 ft)

Population (2004 census)
  - Total: 44,597
- Time zone: UTC+2 (EET)
  - Summer (DST): +3

Al-Tall (Arabic: التل, romanized: at-Tall, also spelled al-Tell) is a city in southern Syria, administratively part of the Rif Dimashq Governorate and capital of the al-Tall District. Situated in the middle of the Anti-Lebanon Mountains, having an elevation of roughly 1,000 meters above sea level. Nearby localities include Maaraba to the southwest, Damascus to the south, Dahiyat al-Assad and Douma to the southeast, Maarat Saidnaya to the northeast, Manin to the north, Ashrafiyat al-Wadi and Basimah to the northwest and al-Hamah and Qudsaya to the west. According to the Syria Central Bureau of Statistics (CBS), al-Tall had a population of 44,597 in the 2004 census. Its inhabitants are predominantly Sunni Muslims.

In the early 1960s al-Tall was reported to be a large village of 3,500 inhabitants. It had a large mosque surrounded by several column fragments, hewn stones and burial grottoes.

== Notable people ==
- Muhammad Mustafa Mero, former Prime Minister of Syria
- Mohamad Afa Al Rifai, Syrian retired footballer

== Bibliography ==
- Boulanger, Robert (1966). The Middle East, Lebanon, Syria, Jordan, Iraq, Iran. Hachette.
