= Talfita =

Talfita تلفيتا
- Village
- Location in Syria
- Coordinates: 33°41′53″N 36°19′16″E
- Country: Syria
- Governorate: Rif Dimashq
- District: al-Tall
- Subdistrict: al-Tall

Population (2004 census)
  - Total: 4,082
- Time zone: UTC+2 (EET)
  - Summer (DST): UTC+3 (EEST)

Talfita (Arabic: تلفيتا) is a Syrian village in the Al-Tall District of the Rif Dimashq Governorate. According to the Syria Central Bureau of Statistics (CBS), Talfita had a population of 4,082 in the 2004 census. Its inhabitants are predominantly Sunni Muslims.

== Climate ==
In Talfita, there is a Mediterranean climate. Rainfall is higher in winter than in summer. The Köppen-Geiger climate classification is Csc. The average annual temperature in Talfita is 11.3 °C (52.3 °F). About 425 mm (16.73 in) of precipitation falls annually.

Climate data for Talfita
Month	Jan	Feb	Mar	Apr	May	Jun	Jul	Aug	Sep	Oct	Nov	Dec	Year
Mean daily maximum °C (°F)	6.6 (43.9)	7.2 (45.0)	10.9 (51.6)	15.0 (59.0)	20.2 (68.4)	24.1 (75.4)	26.4 (79.5)	26.6 (79.9)	24.9 (76.8)	20.1 (68.2)	13.3 (55.9)	7.3 (45.1)	16.9 (62.4)
Mean daily minimum °C (°F)	−1.9 (28.6)	−1.5 (29.3)	0.9 (33.6)	4.3 (39.7)	7.5 (45.5)	11.3 (52.3)	12.8 (55.0)	13.4 (56.1)	10.8 (51.4)	7.5 (45.5)	3.7 (38.7)	−0.4 (31.3)	5.7 (42.3)
Average precipitation mm (inches)	93 (3.7)	75 (3.0)	56 (2.2)	28 (1.1)	18 (0.7)	0 (0)	0 (0)	0 (0)	2 (0.1)	21 (0.8)	47 (1.9)	85 (3.3)	425 (16.7)
Source: Climate-Data.org, Climate data

== Bibliography ==
- Robinson, E.; Smith, E. (1841). Biblical Researches in Palestine, Mount Sinai and Arabia Petraea: A Journal of Travels in the year 1838. Vol. 3. Boston: Crocker & Brewster.
