= Badda (Somalia) =

Settlement

Coordinates: 8°46′34″N 48°53′16″E

Badda (Arabic: بطا, Baṭṭā) was a medieval settlement in the interior of the Somali Peninsula. It is the oldest recorded urban settlement in the interior of what is now Somalia, being first mentioned in the Nuzhat al-mushtāq of al-Idrīsī in 1154. It is also mentioned in the Kitāb al-jughrāfiyā of Ibn Saʿīd from 1270 and by Abulfeda, who relies on Ibn Saʿīd. It was still remembered as late as the fifteenth century, when ʿAlī ibn al-Ḥasan al-Khazrajī records in his al-'Uqud that a prominent Jabarti family emigrated from Badda to Zabīd in Yemen in the thirteenth century. Al-Khazrajī puts the location of Badda in the territory of the Adal Sultanate.

According to al-Idrīsī, Badda was a journey of eight days from the coastal town of Baqday, probably modern Laasqoray. He describes it as a city lying in a sandy desert beyond the Equator at the edge of the known world. That the actual city was north of the Equator is likely, since al-Idrīsī's map places it roughly in the same latitude as Lake Tana. Thus, the proposed identification with the ancient metropolis of Rhapta should be rejected. For al-Idrīsī, Badda borders the land of Barbaria.

If the identification of Baqday with Laasqoray is correct, then Badda must have lain in the Somali interior between Sanaag and Nugaal, based on the distance specified by al-Idrīsī. It may be identifiable with the ruins discovered at Xundhurgaal or possibly with those at nearby Xananley. The name of Badda, from Somali bad (sea, lake), may refer to Lake Cuun, a crater lake at Xundhurgaal. The modern name Cuun (forest) refers to the dense vegetation on its banks. It is a long and narrow lake, 4,000 by 30 metres (13,123 ft × 98 ft). Both proposed sites are in the vicinity of Garoowe, the capital of Puntland. Konrad Miller, placing Baqday closer to Berbera, locates Badda further west, in the Abyssinian interior, near the bend of Africa formed by the Gulf of Aden.

The date of Badda's founding is uncertain, but historical sources record the development of caravan routes in this region in the ninth and tenth centuries. Badda may have been the political centre of the early Muslim chiefs or sultans of the eastern region of Bari, judging by the presence of elite Muslim tombs around Xundhurgaal.

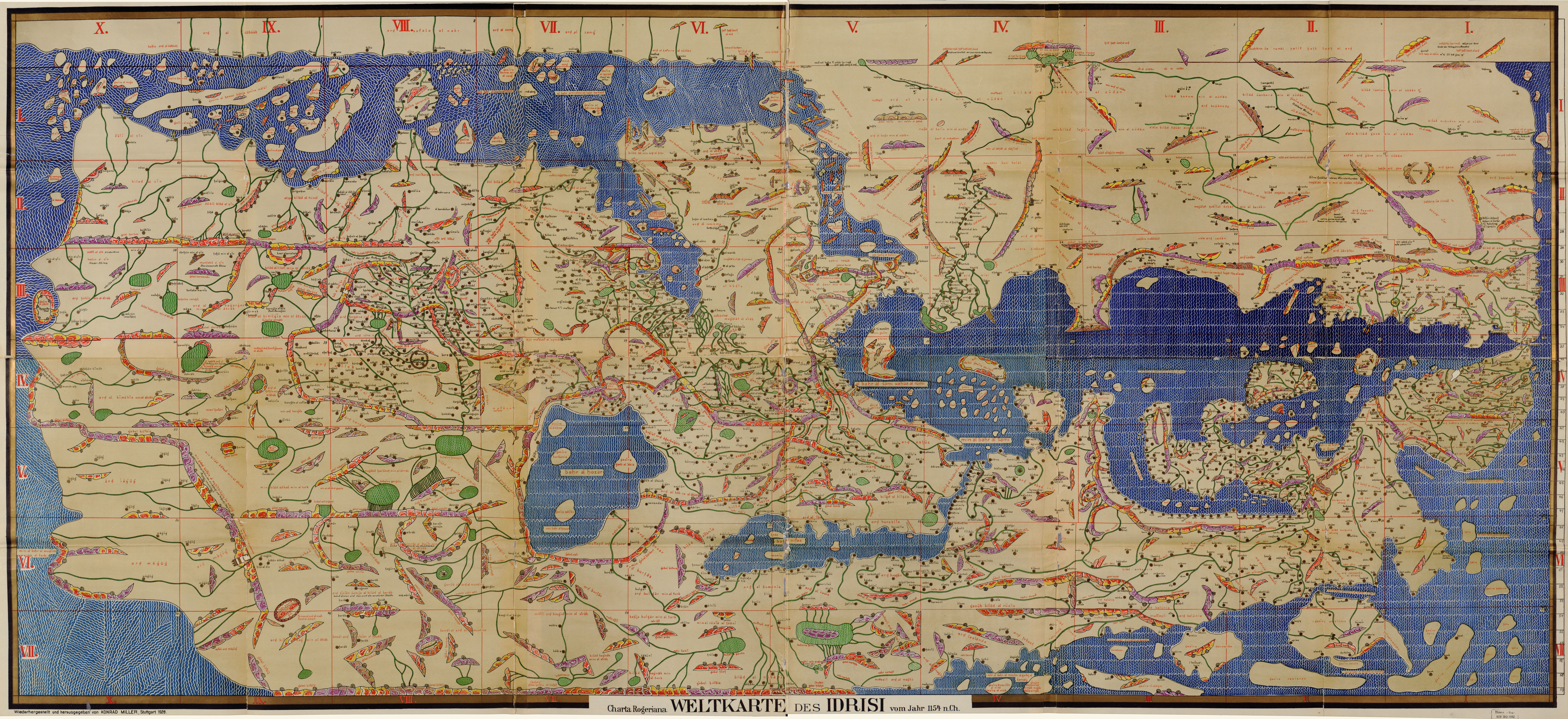
Miller's modern reproduction of al-Idrīsī's world map with Badda at top centre

== Bibliography ==
- Hussein, Said M-Shidad (2021). "Ruined Towns in Nugaal: A Forgotten Medieval Civilisation in Interior Somalia". Azania: Archaeological Research in Africa. 56 (2): 250–271. doi:10.1080/0067270x.2021.1925025.
- Jaubert, Pierre Amédée, ed. (1836). Géographie d'Edrisi. Vol. 1. Paris: Imprimerie Royale.
- Miller, Konrad (1927). Mappae arabicae: Arabische Welt- und Länderkarten (PDF). Vol. 2. Stuttgart.
