= Maarounah =

Maarounah معرونة
- Village
- Location in Syria
- Coordinates: 33°38′4″N 36°23′44″E
- Country: Syria
- Governorate: Rif Dimashq Governorate
- District: Al-Tall District
- Nahiyah: Al-Tall

Population (2004 census)
  - Total: 1,153
- Time zone: UTC+2 (EET)
  - Summer (DST): UTC+3 (EEST)

Maarounah (Arabic: معرونة, romanized: maearuwna) is a Syrian village in the Al-Tall District of the Rif Dimashq Governorate. According to the Syria Central Bureau of Statistics (CBS), Maarounah had a population of 1,153 in the 2004 census. It is a Christian village. With rugged mountainous terrain, the residents rely on cultivating olives and figs, as well as livestock farming. Many archaeological sites overlook the village, making it a popular summer retreat for Damascus residents.

In the Syrian Civil War, the Guardians of the Dawn group played a key role in the fight for the Qalamoun Mountains, where this village is located, between 2013 and 2014.
