= Badda, Chittagong =

Badda
- Location in Bangladesh
- Coordinates: 23°16′N 90°52′E
- Country: Bangladesh
- Division: Chittagong Division
- District: Chandpur District
- Time zone: UTC+6 (Bangladesh Time)

Badda is a village in Chittagong Division of eastern Bangladesh.
