= The Need for Roots =

1949 book by Simone Weil

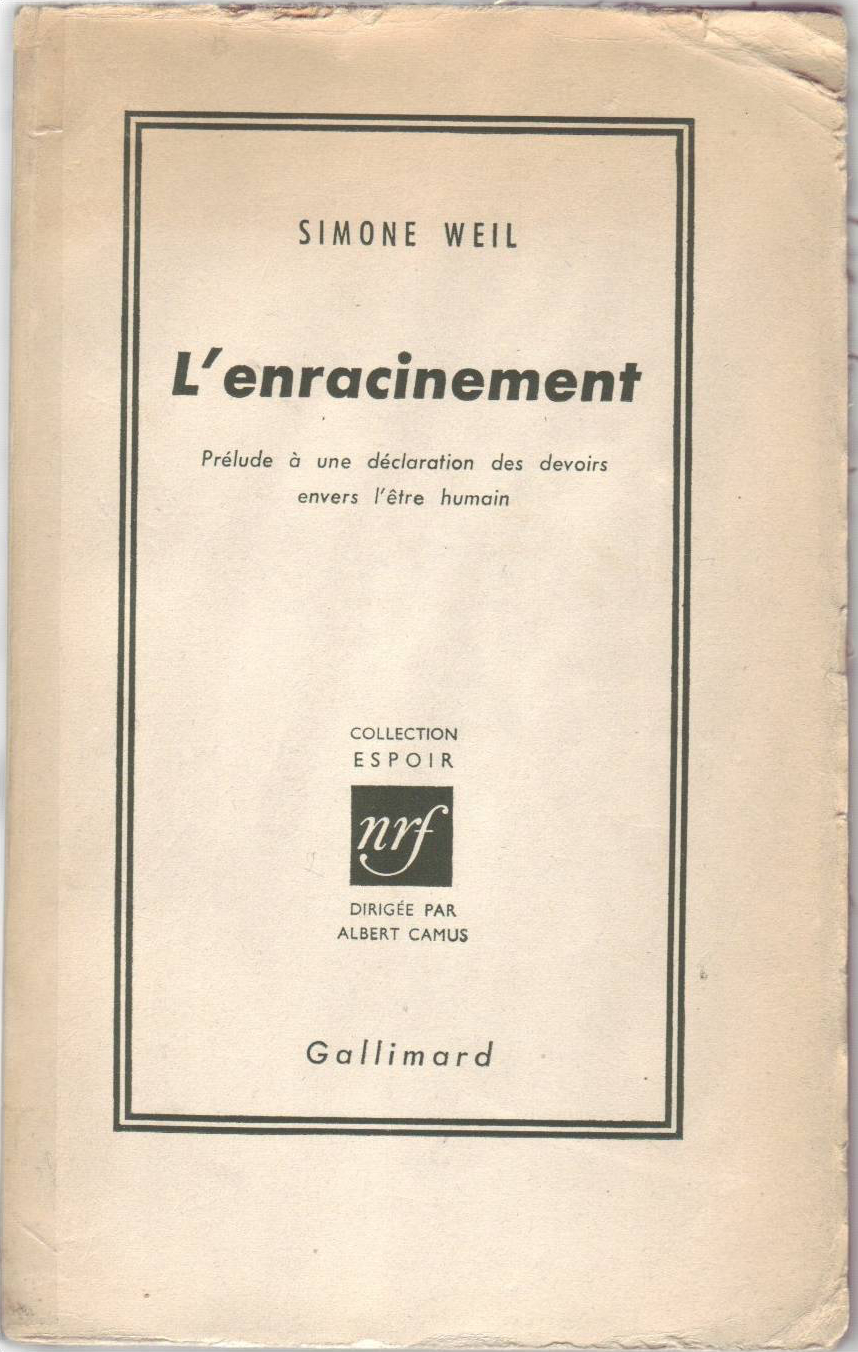
- Author: Simone Weil
- Language: French, English
- Subject: Politics, culture, philosophy
- Genre: Non-fiction
- Publisher: Routledge
- Publication date: 1949 (French), 1952 (English)
- Publication place: France, United Kingdom
- Media type: Paperback
- Pages: 298
- ISBN: 978-0-415-27102-8

The Need for Roots: Prelude to a Declaration of Duties Towards Mankind (French: L'Enracinement, prélude à une déclaration des devoirs envers l'être humain) is a book by Simone Weil. After Weil's death, her parents asked her close friend Boris Souvarine to publish her work under the title "Prelude to a Declaration of Obligations towards the Human Being." In 1949, it appeared in publisher Gallimard’s Espoir collection, edited by Albert Camus, under the title "L’Enracinement". The first English translation was published in 1952.

The work diagnoses the causes of the social, cultural, and spiritual malaise which Weil saw as afflicting 20th-century civilisation, particularly Europe, but also the rest of the world. Weil supports a significant cultural shift, stating that order means society requires a web of social relations where no one must violate an obligation to fulfill another obligation. Weil examines what she calls 'Uprootedness', defined as a near-universal condition resulting from the destruction of ties with the past and the dissolution of community. Weil specifies the requirements that must be met so that peoples can once again feel rooted, in a cultural and spiritual sense, to their environment, to their labour, and to both the past and to expectations for the future. The book discusses the political, cultural, and spiritual currents that ought to be nurtured so that people have access to sources of energy that will help them lead fulfilling, joyful, and morally good lives. A leading theme is the need to recognize the spiritual nature of work.

The Need for Roots is regarded as Weil's best-known work and has provoked a variety of responses, from being described as a work of "exceptional originality and breadth of human sympathy" to "a collection of egregious nonsense."

== Background ==
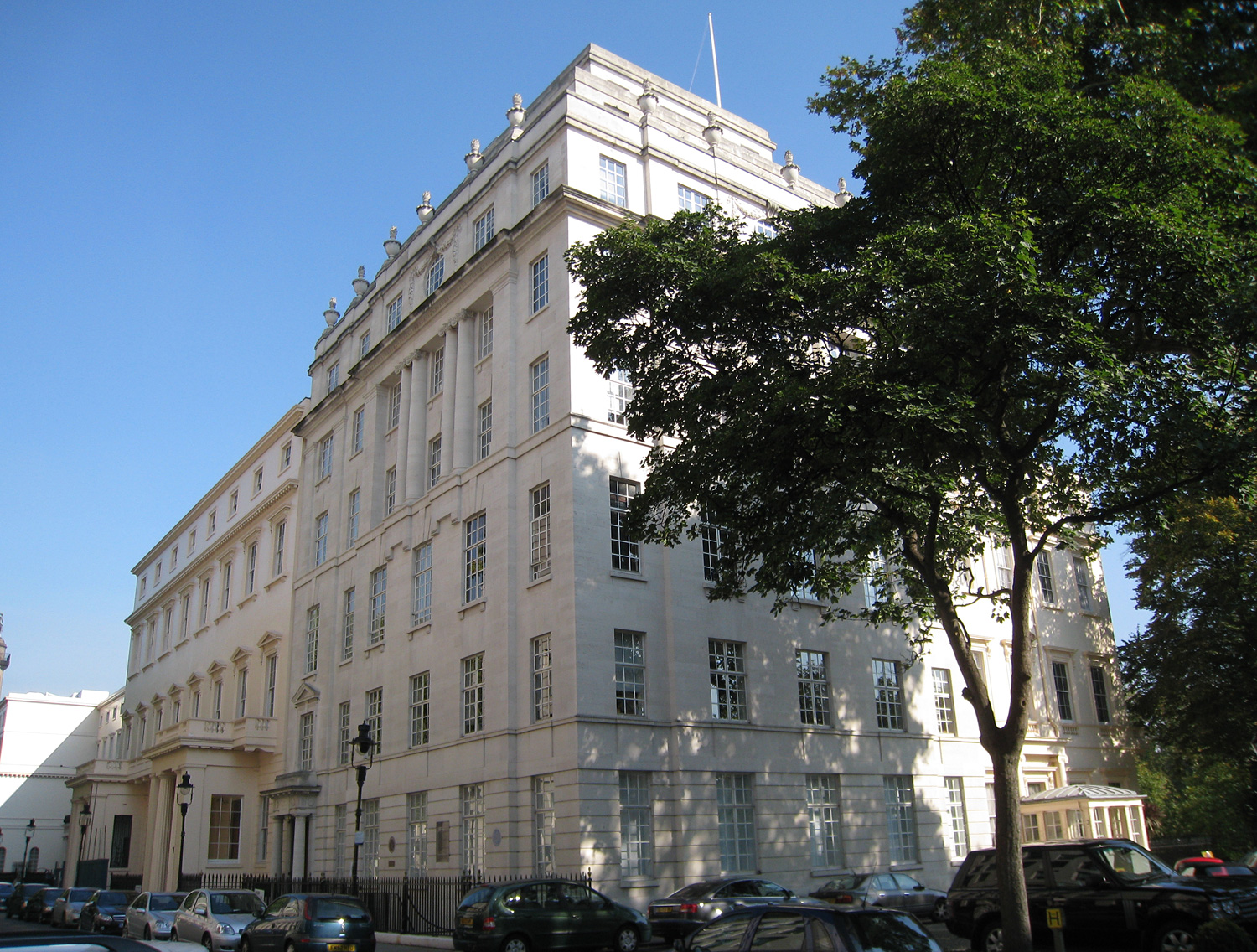
4 Carlton gardens, London. During WWII the building served as provisional headquarters of the Free French Resistance movement. Weil was stationed here while she wrote Need for Roots.

France fell to Nazi Germany in 1940, at which time many French leaders collaborated with the Nazis as part of the Vichy Government. Since 1942, Weil was attempting to return to France. Weil was introduced to André Philip, Minister of the Interior under Charles De Gaulle, by Maurice Schumann, a fellow student of Alain. Philip wrote to Weil, saying he read her work before the war and respected her. Weil attended his lecture while he was in New York, and Philip called for a moral and spiritual revolution for a Free France, with morals superior to that of Vichy France. Philip interviewed Weil for a position in the Commiserate for the Interior in London. In 1943 Weil was hired to work there under Philip and Francis Lous Coston. Weil worked from Mayfair at 19 Hill Street in London to receive and edit reports from France, and also to write. Weil longed to be more directly involved in the French resistance, though officials rejected her more direct involvement including her effort to bring herself and nurses into war zones.

The book was written in the early months of 1943. At the time, Weil was writing an incredible amount of work, including translations of the Upanishads, What is Sacred in Every Human Being?, Are We Fighting for Justice?, Essential Ideas for a New Constitution, and Concerning the Colonial Problem in its Relation to the Destiny of the French People. These ideas influenced the Need for Roots, and Weil began to envision a world where the Allies obtained victory and a new France could be built. Weil was worried that France would rebuild with the same mistakes as the French Revolution of 1789, and Weil was concerned about Philip's vision for a new country based on universal rights which Weil felt was insufficient, advocating for a new country built on a framework of obligations and needs. Weil also argues for a patriotism not rooted in borders, but instead rooted in compassion and new relationship work and labor based on the spiritual nature of work. These arguments reflect the concern Weil and other thinkers at the time have concerning the rebuilding of a free France. The book's initial form was a report which Weil had been asked to write for the Free French Resistance movement concerning the possibilities for effecting a regeneration in France once the Germans had been driven back. The work was originally submitted along with a shorter companion essay called Draft for a statement of human obligations. "Spirituality of work", a leading theme in the book, was a concept that had occupied Weil throughout her career. According to biographer Richard Rees, her whole life's work can be viewed as an attempt to elucidate the concept, which she saw as the one great original idea of the West. Weil presented physical labor as the type of work most suited to developing a direct connection with God. Her analysis was informed by a year-long stretch as a factory hand and by several periods working as an agricultural labourer.

== Synopsis ==
The book is divided into three parts. Part one is subdivided into fourteen sections, each dealing with a specific human need. Collectively these are referred to as 'needs of the soul'. Part two is subdivided into three sections, dealing with the concept of uprootedness in relation to urban life, to rural life and to nationhood. Part three is undivided and discusses the possibilities for inspiring a nation. Only a small part of the book discusses the specific solutions that were of unique applicability to France in the 1940s. Most of the work discusses the general case and is of broad and lasting relevance.

=== Part One: The Needs of the Soul ===
==== Obligations and Rights ====
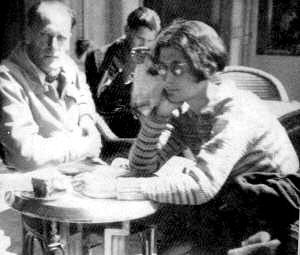
Simone Weil

Part one begins with a discussion of obligations and rights. Weil asserts that obligations are more fundamental than rights, as a right is only meaningful insofar as others fulfil their obligation to respect it. A man alone in the universe, she says, would have obligations but no rights. Rights are therefore "subordinate and relative" to obligations. Weil says that those directing the French Revolution were mistaken in basing their ideas for a new society on the notion of rights rather than obligations, suggesting that a system based on obligations is superior.

Weil claims that while rights are subject to varying conditions, obligations are "eternal", "situated above this world" and "independent of conditions", applying to all human beings. The actual activities which obligations require us to perform, however, may vary depending on circumstances. The most fundamental obligation involves respecting the essential needs of others – the "needs of the soul".

Weil differentiates between rights and obligations viewing the two as subject and object. "The actual relationship between the two is as between object and subject. A man, considered in isolation, only has duties, amongst which are certain duties towards himself. Other men, seen from his point of view, only have rights. He, in his turn, has rights, when seen from the point of view of other men, who recognize that they have obligations towards him. A man left alone in the universe would have no rights whatever, but he would have obligations." Weil elaborates supporting the idea that obligations alone are independent stating "rights are always found to be related to certain conditions. Obligations alone remain independent of conditions." with obligations being a universal condition "All human beings are bound by identical obligations, although these are performed in different ways according to particular circumstances." whereas rights are conditional "...a right is not effectual by itself, but only in relation to the obligation to which it corresponds".

Weil backs up her ideas on the needs of the soul by mentioning that Christian, ancient Egyptian and other traditions have held similar moral views throughout history, particularly on the obligation to help those suffering from hunger. This, Weil says, should serve as a model for other needs of the soul. Weil also makes a distinction between physical needs (such as for food, heating and medical attention) and non-physical needs that are concerned with the "moral side" of life. Both kinds are vital, and the deprivation of these needs causes one to fall into a state "more or less resembling death".

Weil goes into detail on collectives, such as a nation. She says that obligations are not binding to collectives, but to the individuals of which the collective is composed. Collectives should be respected, not for their own sake, but because they are 'food for mankind'. Collectives that are not 'food for mankind' – harmful or useless collectives – should be removed. Thus, service to a collective may require total sacrifice, but the collective is not superior to the person, similar to how sacrifice for another person may require total sacrifice without implying that one person is worth more than another.

==== Needs of the Soul ====
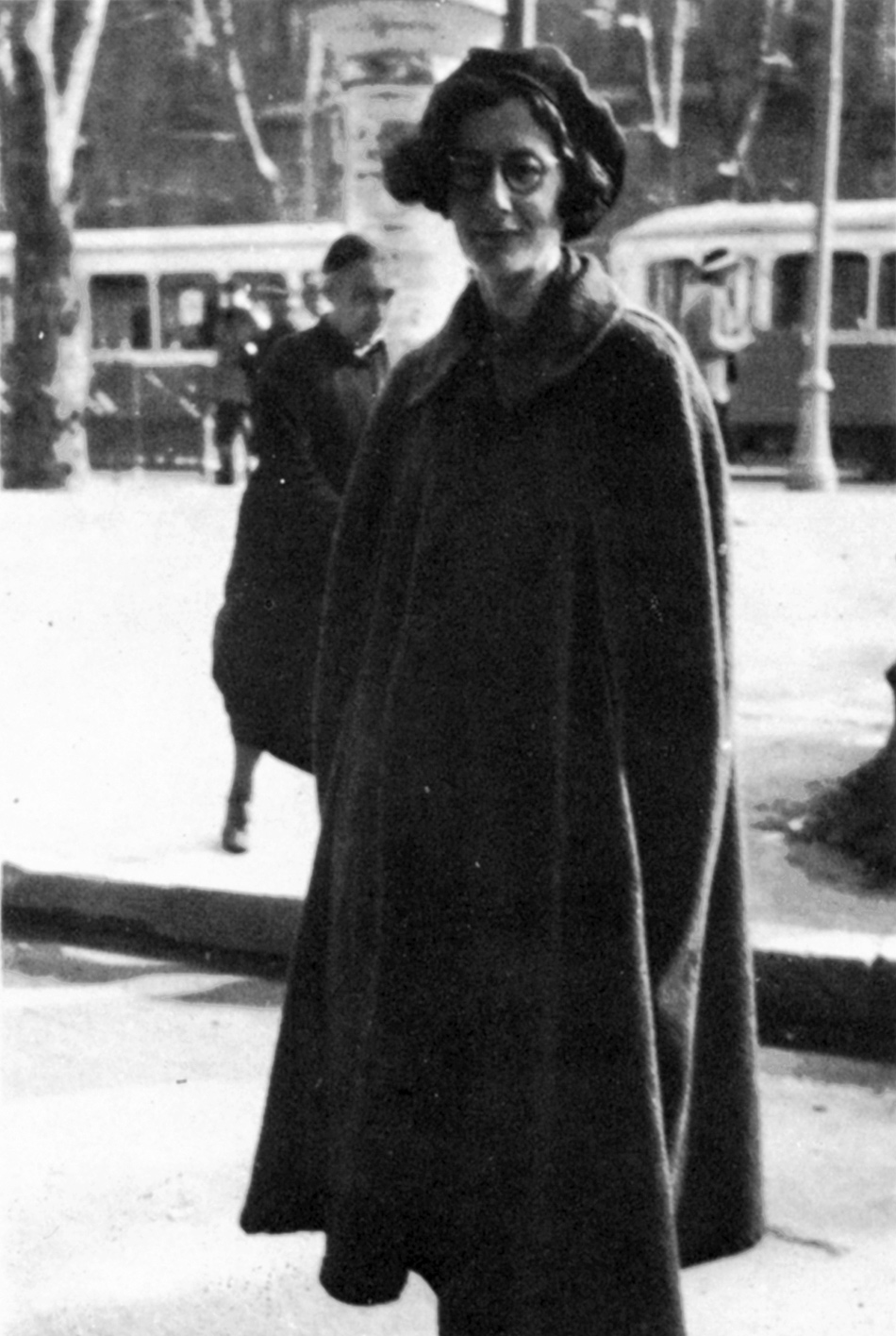
Weil in Marseilles

The remainder of part one is divided into sections discussing the essential "needs of the soul", which Weil says correspond to basic bodily needs like the requirements for food, warmth and medicine. She says such needs can mostly be grouped into antithetical pairs, such as the needs for rest and activity, or for warmth and coolness, and that they are best satisfied when a balance is struck, allowing both needs to be met in turn. In communities where all essential needs are satisfied, there will be a "flowering of fraternity, joy, beauty, and happiness".

- Order Order is the fundamental need of the soul. It consists of a just and coherent structure of obligations within society. People naturally desire to do good, but when they are pulled between conflicting duties, they can become disoriented or morally injured. True order requires understanding the distinction between needs and desires: needs are finite and can be satisfied, whereas desires are potentially limitless. For example, while a miser may never have enough gold, people can have enough bread. Just as hunger can be satiated, so too can the needs of the soul. These needs often come in complementary pairs, rest and activity, solitude and social life, requiring balance rather than excess. Order must be dynamic, continually negotiated within the changing conditions of social life.
- Liberty Liberty is the soul’s need to make meaningful choices. While social rules are necessary, they do not diminish liberty if they are few, clearly justified, and designed for the common good. Mature individuals will not find reasonable limits oppressive. Weil compares such limits to commonsense habits, like not eating harmful substances. Only the immature see all restrictions as infringements. Ultimately, liberty must be understood in relation to the moral maturity of the individual and the rationality of the rules imposed.
- Obedience Obedience is a vital need, provided it is given freely to legitimate authority. Obedience that stems from fear or the hope of reward is servile and unworthy. For obedience to nourish the soul, individuals must understand and consent to the principles guiding authority. A shared social aim, grasped by all members, lends meaning and dignity to obedience. Respect must flow both upward and downward in hierarchies for obedience to be morally sound.
- Responsibility The soul needs to feel useful and indispensable to others. People should be given chances (large or small) to take initiative and lead, especially in areas where they are deeply committed. This includes the ability to make decisions that affect others. The unemployed, in particular, suffer deeply from a lack of responsibility. For those with strong character, the opportunity to exercise leadership is essential. A healthy community should ensure everyone has, at some point, the chance to lead and to be accountable, reinforcing communal bonds and moral development.
- Equality Equality is the recognition of every human being’s equal worth and entitlement to respect, regardless of differences. Weil argues for a balanced society where inequality of function or role does not translate into inequality of dignity. While social mobility and merit matter, we must not treat people in less prestigious roles as inferior. Those in positions of power must be held to higher ethical standards, especially when wronging those in weaker positions. Differences among people should be viewed not as rankings, but as diverse expressions of humanity. True equality demands universal education and the opportunity for each person to fulfill a role in which they can thrive with dignity.
- Hierarchy A just hierarchy meets the soul’s need for symbolic order. Superiors should be regarded not as individuals to be flattered or feared, but as representatives of collective obligations. True hierarchy inspires devotion because it reflects the moral structure of society, not personal domination. Superiors must recognize that they are symbols of responsibility, not sources of arbitrary power.
- Honor Honor is the need for recognition based on one’s fidelity to a set of shared ideals. It goes beyond basic respect and reflects how one’s actions align with values such as courage, integrity, and generosity. This need is best met within professions or traditions that preserve memories of nobility and virtue. Oppression creates a famine of honor by erasing the dignity of marginalized groups. Weil calls for the abolition of socially dishonored categories such as immigrants, Indigenous peoples, sex workers, or the working poor, arguing that only crime, not social status, should exclude someone from public esteem. Rehabilitation, not exclusion, should be the goal.
- Punishment Weil distinguishes between two types of necessary punishment. Disciplinary punishment supports the individual’s conscience and strengthens their ability to resist vice. Punitive punishment, which is essential for reintegration into the moral order. A crime places a person outside the chain of obligations; punishment, even involving pain, aims to restore that moral connection. Punishment must serve the soul’s sense of justice, awakening it as music awakens the sense of beauty.
- Freedom of Opinion The soul needs freedom of thought and expression. However, Weil draws a distinction between individual expression and the influence of mass media. Harmful opinions should not be promoted in media that shape public consciousness. Writers and journalists, given their power, bear moral obligations. Freedom of thought cannot survive in a climate dominated by propaganda or partisan coercion. Political parties and ideological collectivities, by demanding conformity, often destroy genuine freedom of opinion. Weil suggests that abolishing political parties might protect independent thought. Ultimately, freedom of thought must be protected not only from censorship, but from manipulation and mass deception.
- Security Security is freedom from persistent fear. While occasional danger may be inevitable, enduring terror paralyzes the soul. People need the assurance that their safety and dignity will be protected in ordinary circumstances, allowing them to live without anxiety and degradation.
- Risk The soul also needs exposure to risk, danger that invites a thoughtful and courageous response. Without risk, life becomes boring and spiritually numbing. However, the amount of risk must be bearable; overwhelming fear produces paralysis rather than growth. The aim is to cultivate courage, not recklessness.
- Personal Property Weil holds that individuals suffer spiritually when deprived of personal property—items that serve as extensions of their body and work. People should, where possible, own their homes and tools. True property is tied to use and personal connection. For example, it is a violation when someone earns rent from farmland they do not cultivate or care for. Property should reflect real ties between people and the objects they rely on for their livelihood.
- Collective Property Alongside personal property, there is a need for collective ownership where all members of society feel a sense of belonging to shared spaces, institutions, and traditions. This sense is lost in modern systems where ownership is reduced to profit and control. Factories and institutions should be oriented toward communal use and meaning, not private gain. Weil advocates detaching money from ownership and aligning it with service and stewardship. Institutions must be restructured to meet the soul's need for shared identity and purpose.
- Truth The need for truth is the most sacred. It is violated when people lack access to accurate, intelligible information. Since working people often lack the time or training to verify claims, writers and media figures have a deep responsibility to avoid falsehood. Deliberate lies and propaganda are crimes against the soul and should be met with severe consequences. Without truth, thought cannot exist; but without real thought, freedom is only an illusion.

=== Part Two: Rootedness and Uprootedness ===
==== Defining Roots ====
Weil argues that rootedness is a spiritual need which involves their real, active, and natural participation in the life of a collectivity that keeps alive the treasures of the past and the aspirations of the future. Weil believes this rootedness is natural, coming from place, birth, and occupation with each person needing to have multiple roots and deriving their moral, intellectual, and spiritual life from the environment in which they belong. Weil believes that an exchange of influences between places is vital, but the exchange should not have new elements be additions but should stimulate more intensity of the existing. Weil compares this to a painter entering a museum, who upon seeing other works understands his own originality.

Weil contracts rootedness with uprootedness, a condition where people lack deep and living connections with their environment Uprootedness may be caused by many factors, including conquest, colonialism, money, and economic domination. Weil states money destroys roots wherever it goes, because the drive to make money supplants everything else. The drive for money requires less attention than other incentives, and thus overshadows them. Uprootedness is aggravated if people also lack participation in community life and uprooted people lack connections with the past and a sense of their own integral place in the world.

==== Uprootedness in Towns ====
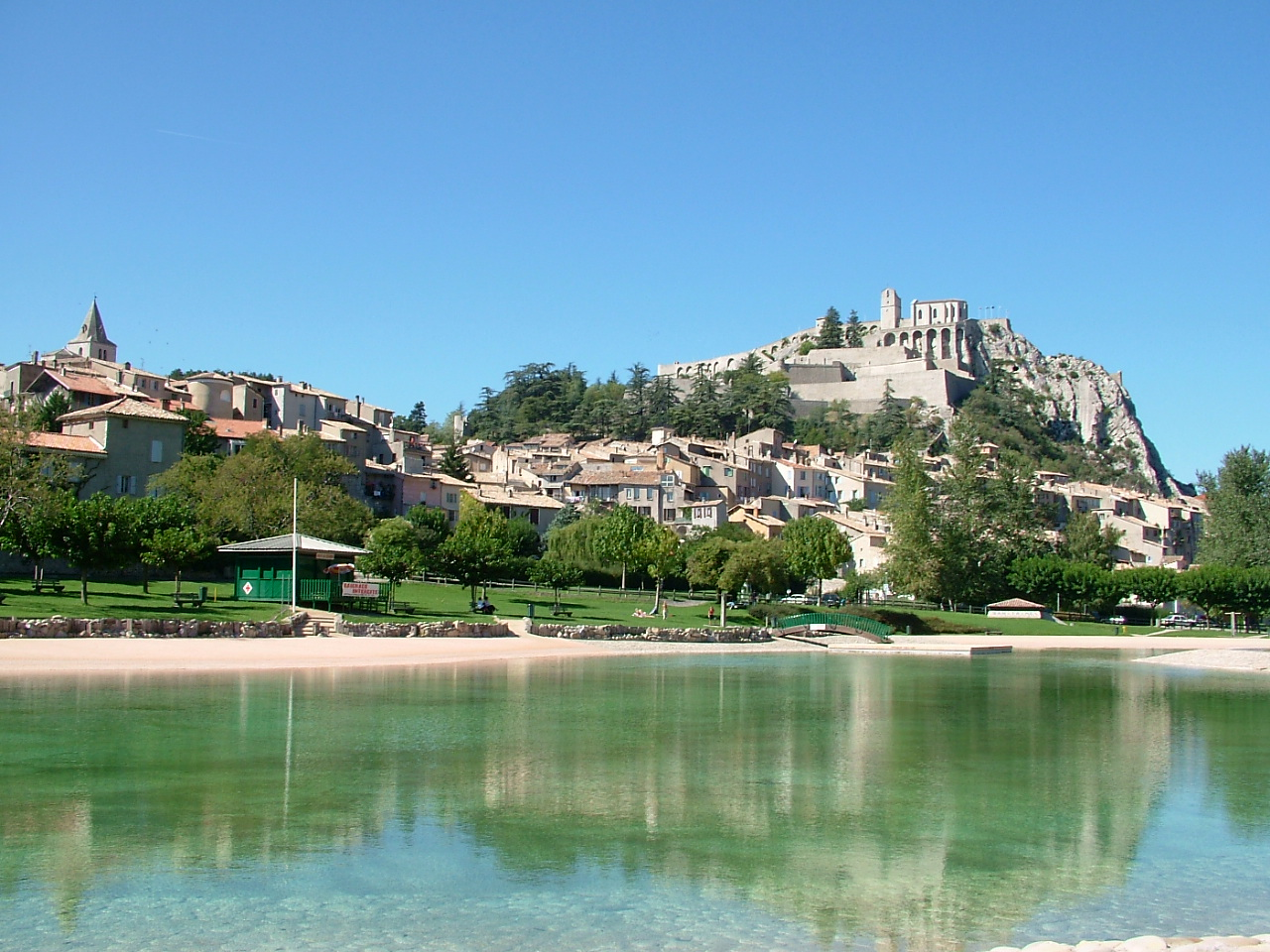
Sisteron in south east France. Weil considered that the nascent civilisation which existed in the Provence region before the Albigensian Crusade had a culture where labour was free from all "taint of slavery" and the spiritual dimension of work was recognised.

Weil first addresses industrial uprootedness stating that wage-earning and its dependence on money and minimal wages is where uprootedness is most acute. Weil asserts that in 20th century France and elsewhere the condition of uprootedness is most advanced in towns, especially among the lower paid workers who have a total dependence on money. Weil writes their uprootedness is so severe it's effectively as though they had been banished from their own country and then temporally reinstated on sufferance, forced by oppressive employers to have almost their entire attention taken up with drudgery and piecework. For the urban poor without work it's even worse, unemployment is described as "uprootedness squared."

The gulf between high culture from the mass of the people that has been widening since the renaissance is another factor contributing to up rootedness. Education now has only limited effect in helping to create roots as academic culture has lost its connection both with this world and the next. Many academics have become obsessed with learning not for a desire for knowledge for its own sake but due to the utility it offers for attaining social prestige.^{35}

Weil discussed how uprootedness is a self-propagating condition, giving the example of the Romans and Germans after World War I as uprooted people who set about uprooting others. Whoever is rooted doesn't uproot others – Weil opines that the worst examples of misconduct by the Spanish and English during the colonial age were from adventurers who lacked deep connections with the life of their own countries. Weil states both the left-wing and right-wing have activists who want the working class to be rooted again, but on the left there is sizeable contingent who merely want everyone to be reduced to the same level of uprootedness as the proletariats, and on the right a section who want the workers to remain unrooted the better to be able to exploit them. Weil states disunity prevents good intentioned activists from having much effect. Weil states another factor hampering reform efforts is the tendency of human nature not to pay attention to misfortune – she discusses how unions often spend most of their energies looking out for relatively well off special interests, neglecting the weak who were being most oppressed, such as youth, women and immigrant workers.

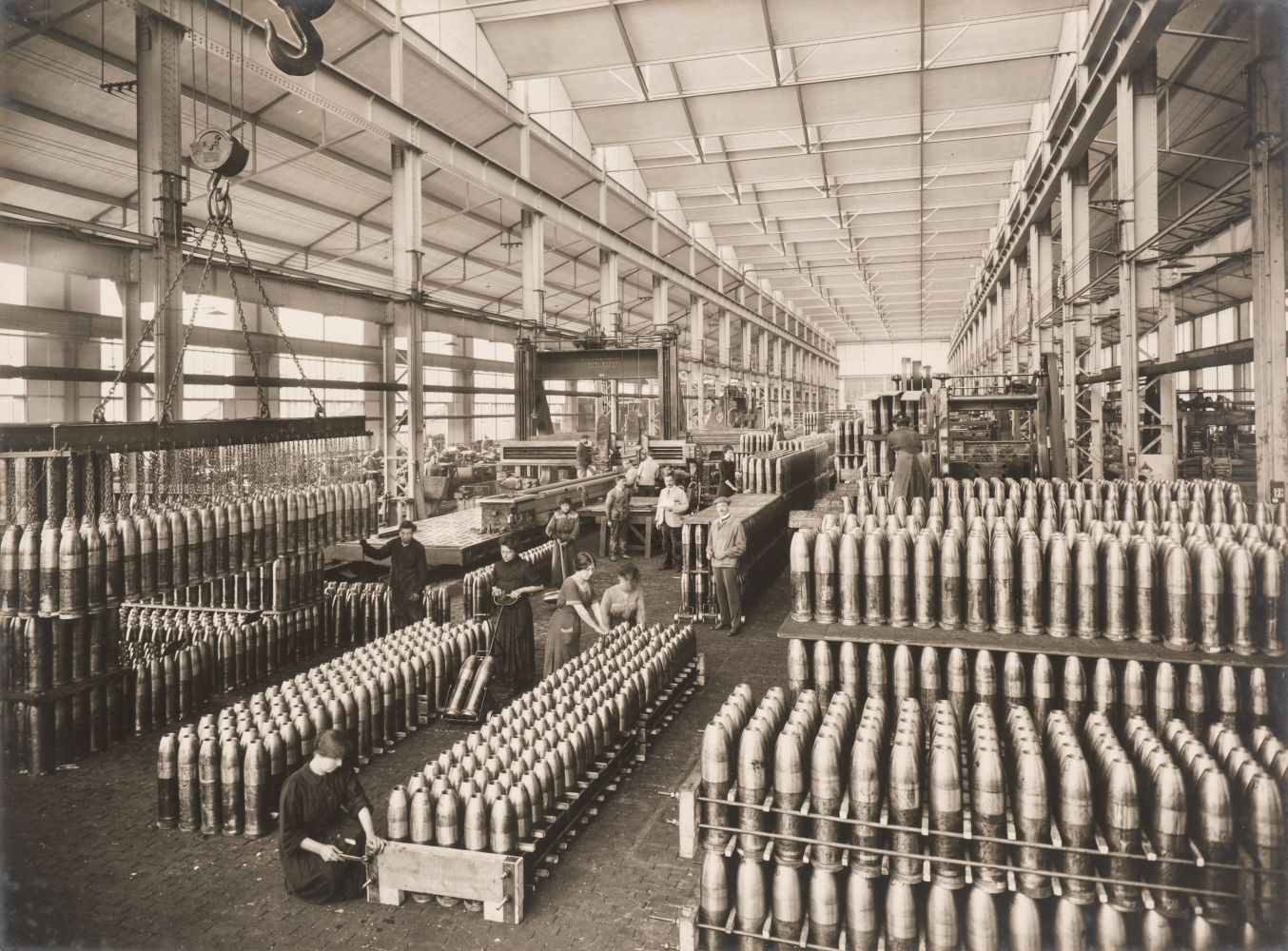
French factory

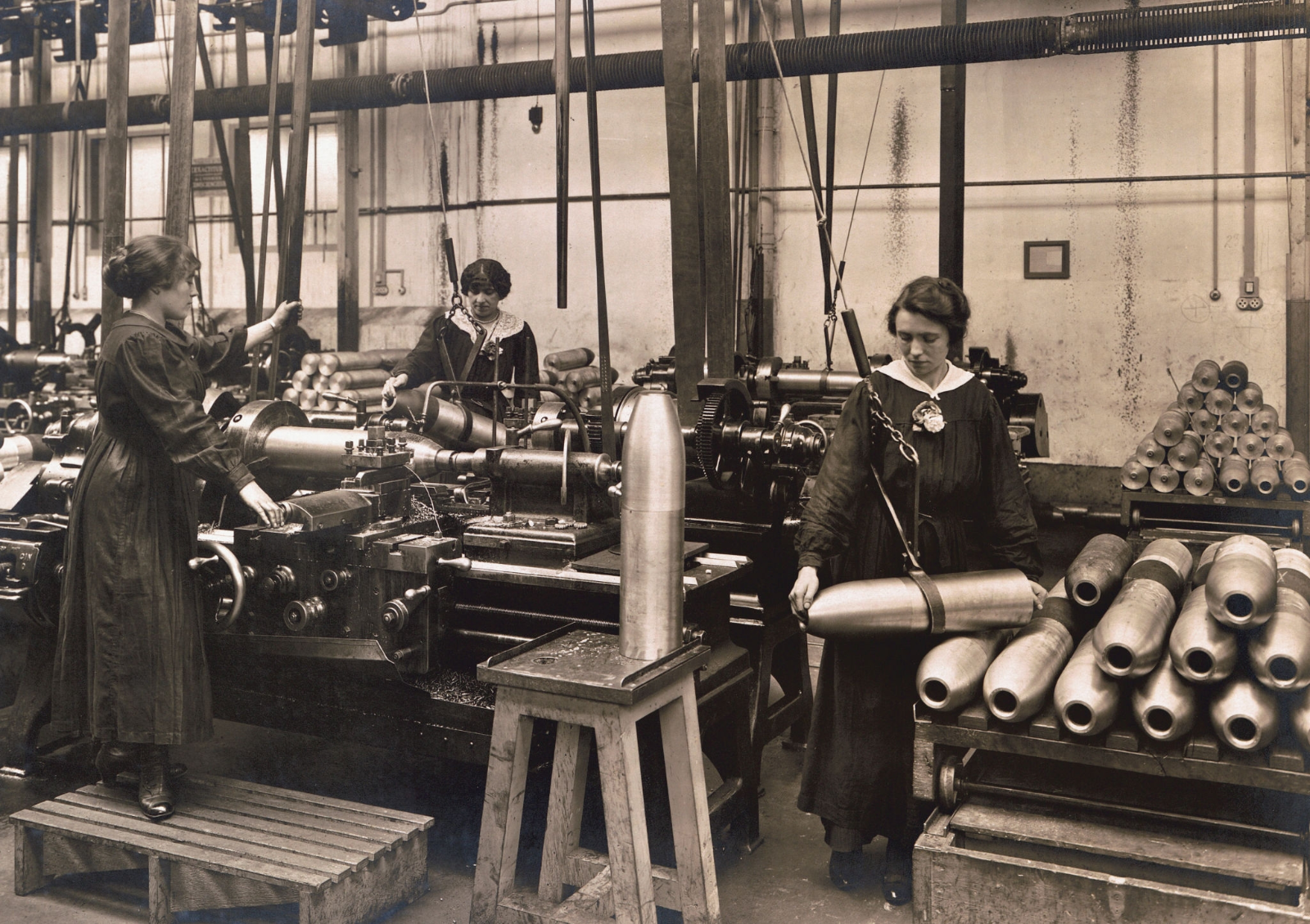
French factory labor

Weil proposes various measures to address urban uprootedness. She says little can be done for uprooted adults, but it would be easier to rescue the next generation. One of her first suggestions is to eliminate psychic shock experienced by young workers when they transition from school where authority figures care about their wellbeing to the world of work, where they're effectively just a "cog in a machine." Weil discusses Marxist theory, and states that working conditions uproot the workers and advises that workers should share in their companies' strategy through thinking and feeling, be allowed to vary how they apply their attention during the day, and be aware of their value.^{42}

Weil continues stating machines should be designed with the needs of the workmen in mind, not just the demands of cost efficient production. Weil advocates for a cooperative system in which workers have free choice over how to schedule their day by having a set number of orders to finish them allowing workers to self-organize as they choose to complete the orders.^{46} Weil goes on to argue for the abolishment or large factories to be replaced with smaller factories with limited work hours and dedicated afternoons for comradeship and learning. Machines would be owned by individuals or cooperatives, not the factories, and combined with house and land conferred to them by the state.^{56} Weil suggests that with positive work environments, people have a suitable introduction to work as children, who tend to see the workplace as an intriguing world reserved for adults, then their future experience of work would forever be "lit up by poetry". Weil also advises that a revival of apprenticeships and the original Tour de France would be of great value. Weil says that many of the workers' complaints arise from obsessions created by distress and that the best of way of reacting is not to appease the obsessions but to fix the underlying distress – then all kinds of problems in society just disappear. Weil says that to abolish urban uprootedness it will be essential to establish forms of industrial production and culture where workers could feel at home. Overall, Weil states that this social model would be neither capitalist nor socialist, but allow the company to become an individual.^{59}

Weil states major reforms in education would also be needed. Weil says providing workers with high culture in a form they can suggest is much simpler than objectors expect. There is no need to try and relay large volumes of literature, as a little pure truth lights the soul just as much as a lot of pure truth. The relationships between various educational topics and everyday life as experienced by the workers should be explored. Without watering down high culture, its truths should be expressed in a language "perceptible to the heart".

==== Uprootedness in the Countryside ====
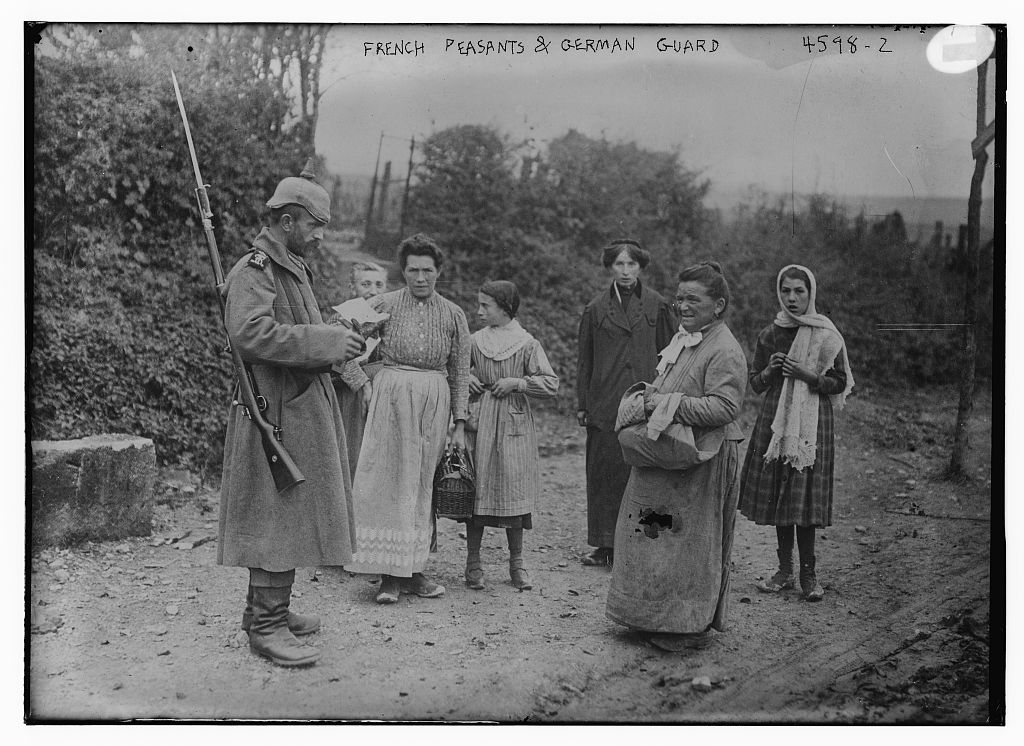
French Peasants Speaking to German Guard

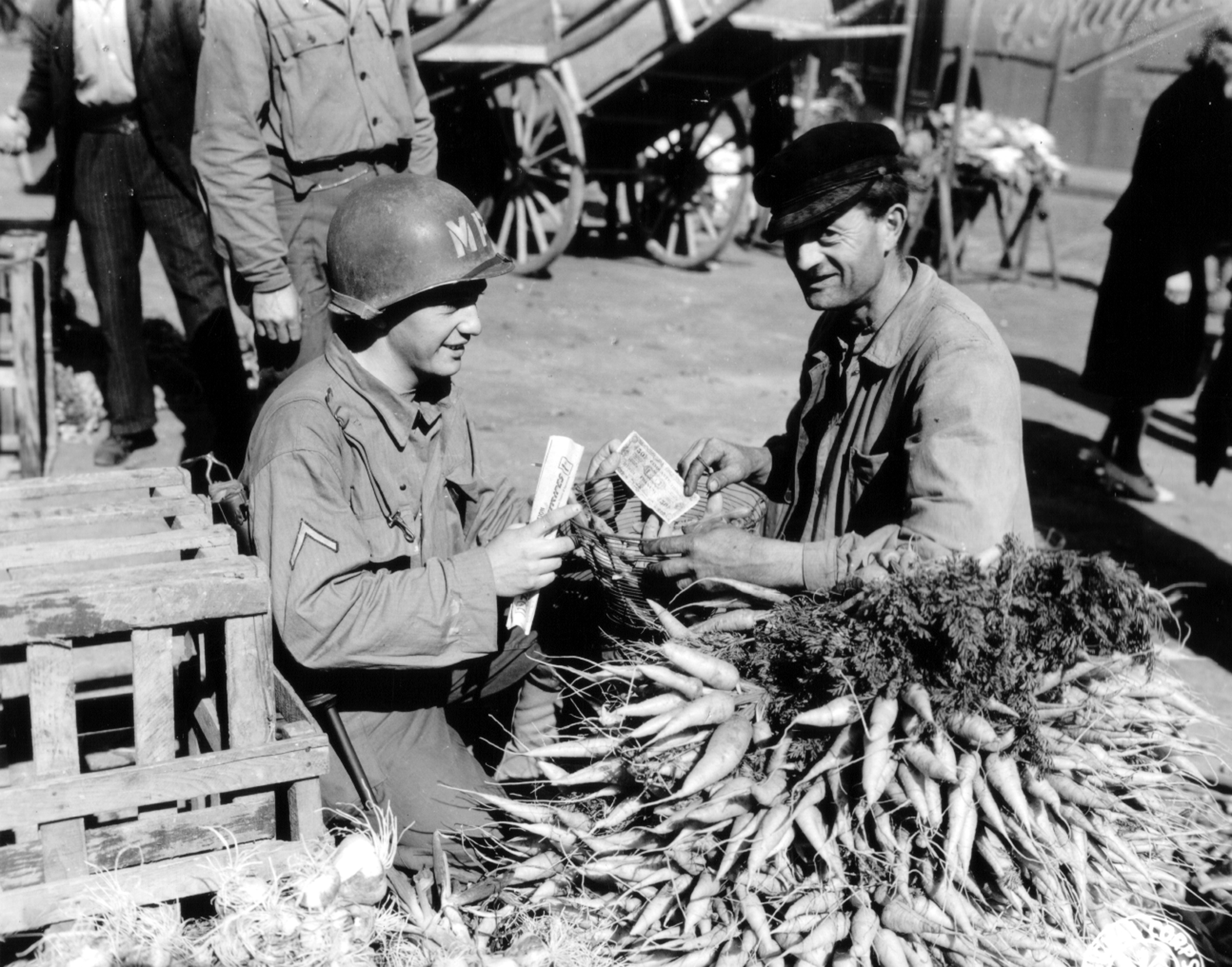
American soldier buying carrots from French Farmer

Weil writes that though uprootedness is not as far advanced in the countryside as in towns, the needs of the peasants should receive equal attention to the need of industrial workers: firstly because it is contrary to nature for the land to be worked by uprooted individuals and secondly as one of the causes of the peasant's distress is the feeling that progressive movements ignore them in favor of industrial workers. Weil states that while urban workers are focused on mechanics, rural workers are focused on the cycles of the sun, land, and their labor.^{66}

Weil claims a peasant's requirements include a strong need to own land, which is important for them to feel rooted. Weil worries that boredom may harm many peasants who, starting from about age 14, do the same work throughout their lives. Weil suggests a tradition should be established for peasant youths to take a few months out for travel in their late teens, similar to the tour de France that used to exist for apprentice artisans. Those who desire it should also be able to return to education for a year or two.

Returning to education, Weil argues rural communities require different teaching methods compared to towns. Weil states an opposition to both religious schools and theological schooling, stating secular education robs children of the richness of the need for understanding the beauty in Christianity, while a purely Christian education robs children of the need to understand the richness of other traditions. Weil instead advocates for education in France to include a religious component focused on Christianity (because of France's roots in Christian culture) but with exposure to other religions.^{70} Commentaries during education could include both affirmations and denials of dogmas.^{71} Weil states that Christian beauty should be taught in a way that is not aesthetic but as a beauty that acts as substance.^{71} Weil states that beauty of nature is a core need of rural education. Sharing rural folklore can give rural communities a feeling of being part of the larger culture, and rural teachers should share the folklore of all countries.^{67, 68} Science should be presented in terms of the great natural cycles, such as the energy from the sun being captured by photosynthesis, being concentrated into seeds and fruit, passing into man and then partly returning to the soil as he expends energy working the land. Weil writes that if peasants have both well tailored scientific and religious ideas at the back of their minds while they work the fields, it will increase their appreciation of beauty and "Permeate their labor with poetry."

Weil states that working and thinking should not be separate acts.^{73} In the last few pages of this section she focuses on her central theme – that the great vocation of our times is to create a civilization which recognizes the spiritual nature of work. She draws further parallels between spiritual mechanism and physical mechanism, referring to parables in the Bible concerning seeds and then discussing our scientific understanding about how plants reach the surface by consuming the energy in their seeds and then grow upwards towards the light. Weil suggests similar parallels could be targeted for urban workers. She says if people can have both spiritual and scientific ideas converging in the act of work, then even the fatigue associated with toil can be transformed for good, becoming "the pain that makes the beauty of the world penetrates right into the core of the human body." Weil states these ideas may be found in Rousseau, George Sand, Tolstoy, Proudhon, and Marx.^{73} Weil states that developing a civilization based on the spirituality of work is the only thing big enough to offer people to avoid totalitarian idols.^{75} Weil criticizes how with the disappearance of guilds, work has become only a means to an end with that end being money.^{95}

Weil deplores the tendency for education to train workers so they only think intellectually in their leisure hours. She says that while fundamental ideas need not be given conscious attention while workers are busy, they should always be present in the background. Weil presents the case of two women both engaged in sewing; one being a happy expectant mother, the other being a prisoner. While both have their attention occupied by the same technical problems, the pregnant woman never forgets the life growing inside her while the prisoner is always in fear of punishment. Weil says the whole social problem is mirrored in the women's contrasting attitudes. She discusses the two principal forms of greatness, the false greatness based on world conquest and true greatness which is spiritual.

Weil states that like any elevated idea, care should be taken when promoting the union of work and spirituality lest it become discredited due to cynicism and suspicion, and thereby impossible to achieve. But Weil suggests it wouldn't need over selling by the authorities as it would be a solution to the problem on everyone's lips concerning the lack of balance created by rapidly developing material science that hasn't been matched with social or spiritual progress. She also suggests the movement towards recognizing the spirituality of work could be embraced by all sections of society – it would be welcomed by leftists and conservatives alike, with even atheist communists not opposing the idea, as certain quotes from Marx deplored the lack of spirituality in the capitalist world of work – so the movement could create unity.

==== Uprootedness and Nationhood ====
At the start of this section Weil regrets the fact that the nation has become the only collective accessible to most people which is still at least partially rooted. She discusses how institutions both larger and smaller than the nation have been uprooted, such as Christendom, regional and local life, and the family. With regards to the family for example, for most people it has contracted just to the nuclear unit of man, wife and children. Brothers and sisters are already a little bit distant, with very few ever giving the slightest consideration to relatives that died more than 10 years before they were born, or to those who will be born after they have died.

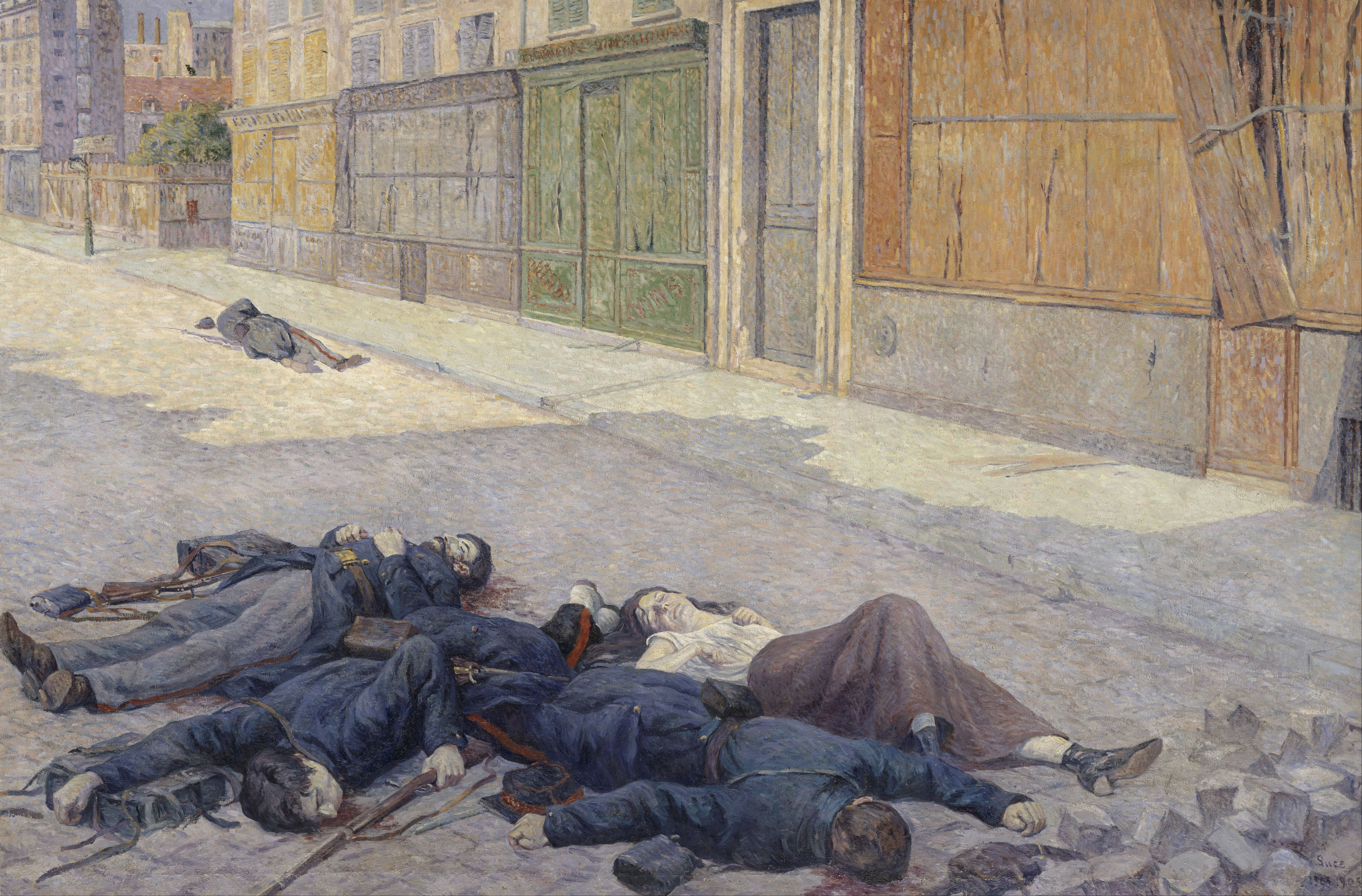
1871 Deaths after Paris Commune

Weil discusses the particular problems affecting the French that result from their unique history: the hatred of kings and distrust of all forms of central authority due to the succession of mostly cruel kings that followed Charles V; the trend instigated by Richelieu which saw the state "sucking out all forms of life" from regional and local institutions; the distrust of religion caused by the Church siding with State; the revival in workers' spirits after the Revolution being undone by the 1871 massacre; the counter reaction that set in after World War I, because during the War the French people had exerted themselves beyond the extent provided for by the limited energies they could draw from their diminished patriotic feelings.

Weil discusses various problems relating to patriotism, including how some lack any patriotism at all, while for others patriotism is too weak a motivation for the demands of wartime. Yet another problem is that for some, patriotism is based on a false conception of greatness, on the success one's nation has had in conquering others – this sort of patriotism can lead people to turn a blind eye to whatever evils their country has committed. Weil criticizes how churches on differing sides of a conflict can both equally wish for victory with the same rites^{75} and states no country is an absolute evil.^{100} Weil argues that states have a motivation to support war through patriotism that cannot be questioned, and that this war's patriotism encourages violence as virtues breaking morality.^{107, 110}

Flag of Free France. Weil hoped that a Free France would build patriotism around compassion

Weil suggests the ideal form of patriotism should be based on compassion. She compares the often antagonized and prideful feelings resulting from a patriotism based on grandeur with the warmth of a patriotism based on tender feeling of pity and an awareness of how a country is ultimately fragile and perishable. A patriotism based on compassion allows one to still see the flaws in one's country, while still remaining ever ready to make the ultimate sacrifice if obligated.

Weil states that denying obligation is a form of spiritual suicide, and we must accept our situation which subjects us to absolute obligations towards things that are relative, limited, and imperfect.^{122} Because people are rooted in their nations, which is connected to their soul and can only connect through that place, one is obligated to defend their nation because being subject to a foreign state would break these roots.^{122-123}

Weil also examines crime stating that crime is not a reason to go closer with compassion, not move away, as crimes do not diminish Christ's compassion.^{134} Weil states that for us to punish the guilty, we must first cleanse ourselves of the crime, hiding within our own souls. Weil states that once we have done this we will no longer have the desire to punish but if duty calls us to punish it will only be done with extreme sadness and as little as possible.^{185} Weil applies this same logic to France as a nation for which compassion is a spiritualization of the country's suffering and that compassion can cross borders to all countries.^{134} Weil states compassion is universal by nature, can be a motivation for the resistance with patriotism inspired by compassion giving the poorest section of people a privileged moral place.^{135} Weil states public action should focus not on power but on education and creating motives and teaching that is beneficial, obligatory, or good.^{144} Weil states all publicly encouraged actions should be accompanied by a description of motives.^{160} Weil states that action has a virtue in the domain of motives and can stir motives that previously did not exist.^{160} Motives must be reinforced for the same actions if motives become fatigued, and to avoid evil actions that become motives in themselves (such as killing in a war with a motive to protect, then killing as an action in and of itself).^{162}

=== Part 3: The Growing of Roots ===
The final section is concerned with the methods by which a people might be inspired towards the good, and how a nation can be encouraged to re-establish its roots. Weil discussed how in contrast to the explosion in knowledge regarding methods for working with materials, people have begun to think that there is no method for spiritual matters. She asserts that everything in creation is dependent on method, given the spiritual methods advised by St John of the Cross as an example.

Inspiring a nation is, therefore, a task that ought to be undertaken methodically. To accomplish the task it's essential to simultaneously point people in the direction of the good while at the same time providing the necessary motivation, so as to provide energy for the required effort. Accordingly, the methods available for inspiring a nation center around public action by the authorities as a means of education. Weil writes this is a very difficult idea to grasp, as at least since the Renaissance, public action has been almost solely a means of exercising power. Weil enumerates five ways in which public action can serve to educate a nation:

- By raising hopes and fears with promises and threat.
- By suggestion.
- By the official expression of previously unstated thoughts already in the minds of the people.
- By example
- By the modality of the actions.

Weil considers that while the first two ways are well understood, they are unsuitable for breathing inspiration into a people. The remaining three methods could be much more effective, but at present no administration has much experience of employing them. The third method, although not without superficial similarities to the suggestive power of propaganda, can in the right circumstances be a highly effective tool for good. Weil wrote that at the current time (writing in 1943), the French resistance authorities have a rare opportunity to inspire their people as while their actions have an official character, they are not the actual state authorities and so don't arouse the cynicism the French traditionally hold for their rulers.

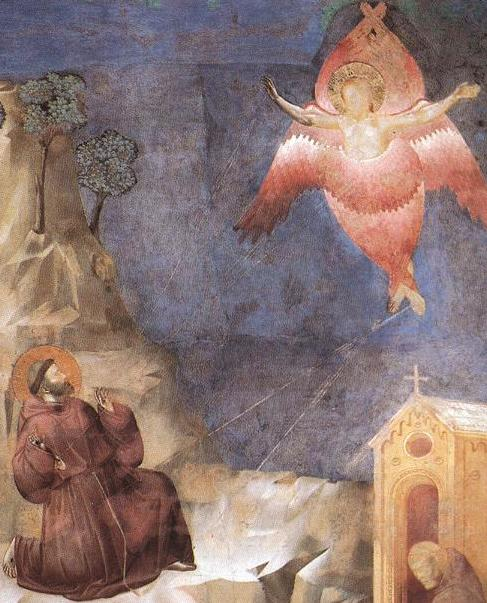
Giotto Painting

Four obstacles are listed that make it difficult to inspire a people towards genuine goodness. First and foremost a false conception of greatness, based on the prestige of might and conquest. Weil opines that France was essentially still motivated by the same sense of greatness that drove Hitler. The other obstacles are idolization of money, a degraded sense of Justice, and a lack of religious inspiration. Only the first and last problem are discussed at length. Weil states that Hitler, even if defeated, has impacted history and may be seen as great by misguided people. Weil states the only punishment that will work (and stop future generations from emulating him), is to transform the meaning of greatness so far that Hitler cannot be associated with it.^{174} Weil states this starts with people changing the definition of greatness in their own hearts, reject social pressure, and excluding themselves spiritually from a society that demands it.^{174} Weil states it is difficult to break society's understanding of greatness when it pervades media, literature, education, and culture and offers an alternative where greatness is associated with beauty (like Zen poems or Giotto's painting), truth, heroism, and saintliness.^{180}

Weil asserts that, prior to about the 16th century, religion and science were united by the search for Truth, but have since become separated ancestral beliefs mutually hostile, with religion often the loser in the battle for public opinion. She suggests religion and science could become reconciled if the spirit of truth is breathed into both; despite the assertions of some scientists to the contrary, the thirst for truth is not a common motivation for science. As an example she discussed the habit of mathematicians who deliberately obscure proofs for their discoveries, showing that they were motivated by competitive instincts and the desire to be recognized above their peers. Weil suggests that the highest study of science is the beauty of the world.

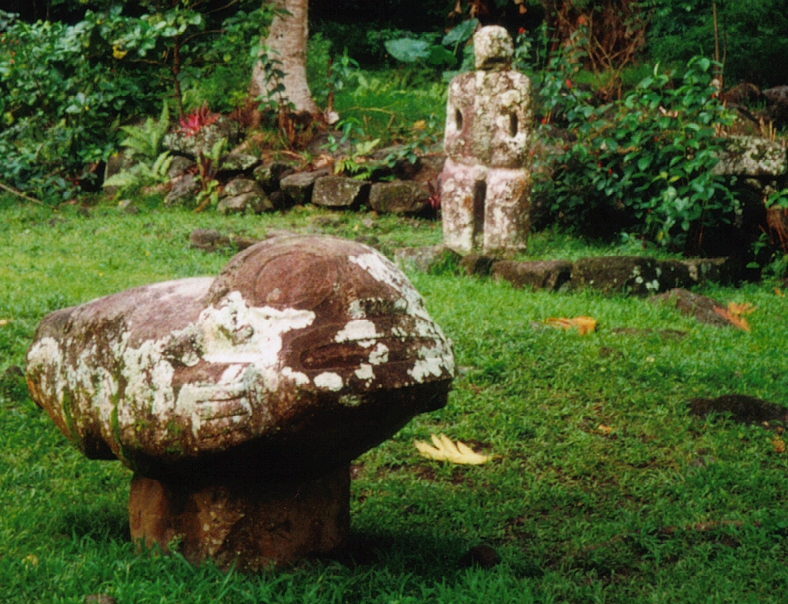
Weil laments the loss of traditional Polynesian culture and religion by colonialism

Simone Weil critiques a form of science that denies rooted beauty and truth, particularly when it is co-opted to justify racial superiority. She links this to missionary efforts that pressured Polynesians to abandon their indigenous, aesthetically and spiritually rich traditions in favor of the Genesis narrative.^{183} She again critiques this distortion of science by pointing to Hitler, who justified his ideology as scientifically valid, even though it was based on lies.^{185, 187}

Weil also condemns the state of contemporary Christianity, arguing that it has become a social convention entangled with the interests of those who exploit others.^{191} This, she says, is due to a spiritual impurity, a lack of the "spirit of truth." In response, she calls for a total and unconditional giving of oneself to God.^{191} She rejects a pragmatic approach to faith, likening it to a pharmaceutical advertisement, only valuable for what it promises to deliver. True faith, she insists, must be total and it must matter so much that losing it would equate to losing the will to live.^{193}

For Weil, the "spirit of truth" is marked by genuine, pure love, an active force that resists falsehood and error.^{196} She laments that such a pursuit of truth and love is largely absent from modern science, which has strayed from its former spiritual essence. Science, she argues, was once a sacred endeavor: a unification of the scientist’s mind with the wisdom inherent in the universe. Early Christianity might have nourished this approach, but its transformation under Roman influence led to the rejection of divine providence, except in highly personal forms. Only mystics preserved this deeper understanding, though they were often condemned.^{202}

Weil accepts the truth of Christ’s miracles but asserts that the miracles of Tibetan and Hindu traditions are also real.^{207} She sees authentic Christian inspiration as preserved in mysticism, and she criticizes a conception of God as a master to be worshipped in the manner of slaves or pagans honoring an emperor, calling this idolatrous.^{215} Instead, she defines divine providence as the organizing principle of the cosmos.^{220}

According to Weil, what we perceive as brute material force is, in fact, pure obedience, an idea present in pre-Roman Christianity and echoed in the wisdom of the Pythagoreans, Lao Tzu, Hinduism, and fragments of Egyptian thought.^{221} She connects this to the Indian idea of balance, simultaneously order and justice, claiming that justice and truth are one and the same.^{222} Even inert matter and suffering souls deserve love, she insists, as all are part of the universe’s beautiful order.^{225} While Roman civilization replaced love with pride, earlier traditions upheld perfect obedience, which the Greeks honored through their reverence for science.^{225}

Weil emphasizes the importance of attention as a means of opening the mind to eternal wisdom.^{226} She suggests that if mathematics and science were reconnected with religious faith, the cosmic order would be more clearly visible.^{229} For Weil, the world’s order is its beauty; the only difference is in how we engage with it, through conceptualization or contemplation.^{229} She believes our civilization (religion, politics, and history) rejects this truth, and thus bears corrupt fruit. She advocates for a reintegration of truth with love, relationships, intelligence, beauty, and an understanding of force.^{229} On the subject of force, Weil states it is a blind mechanism that cannot create justice.^{187} If force were sovereign, justice would be impossible. Instead, she asserts, "the structure of the human heart is a reality among the realities of this universe, in the same way as the trajectory of a star".^{187}

In the book's last few pages Weil returns to a discussion of the spirituality of work, presenting the case that physical labor is spiritually superior to all other forms of work such as technical planning, command, art or science. Weil further asserts that the return of truth will also reawaken the dignity of physical labor.^{229} She describes work as a kind of breath, an act in which the human body and soul become intermediaries between different states of matter. Yet she warns that labor can become violent to human nature, especially when marked by monotony. To consent to work, she argues, is second only to consenting to death, both acts of submission essential to life and fulfillment.^{235}

== Reception ==
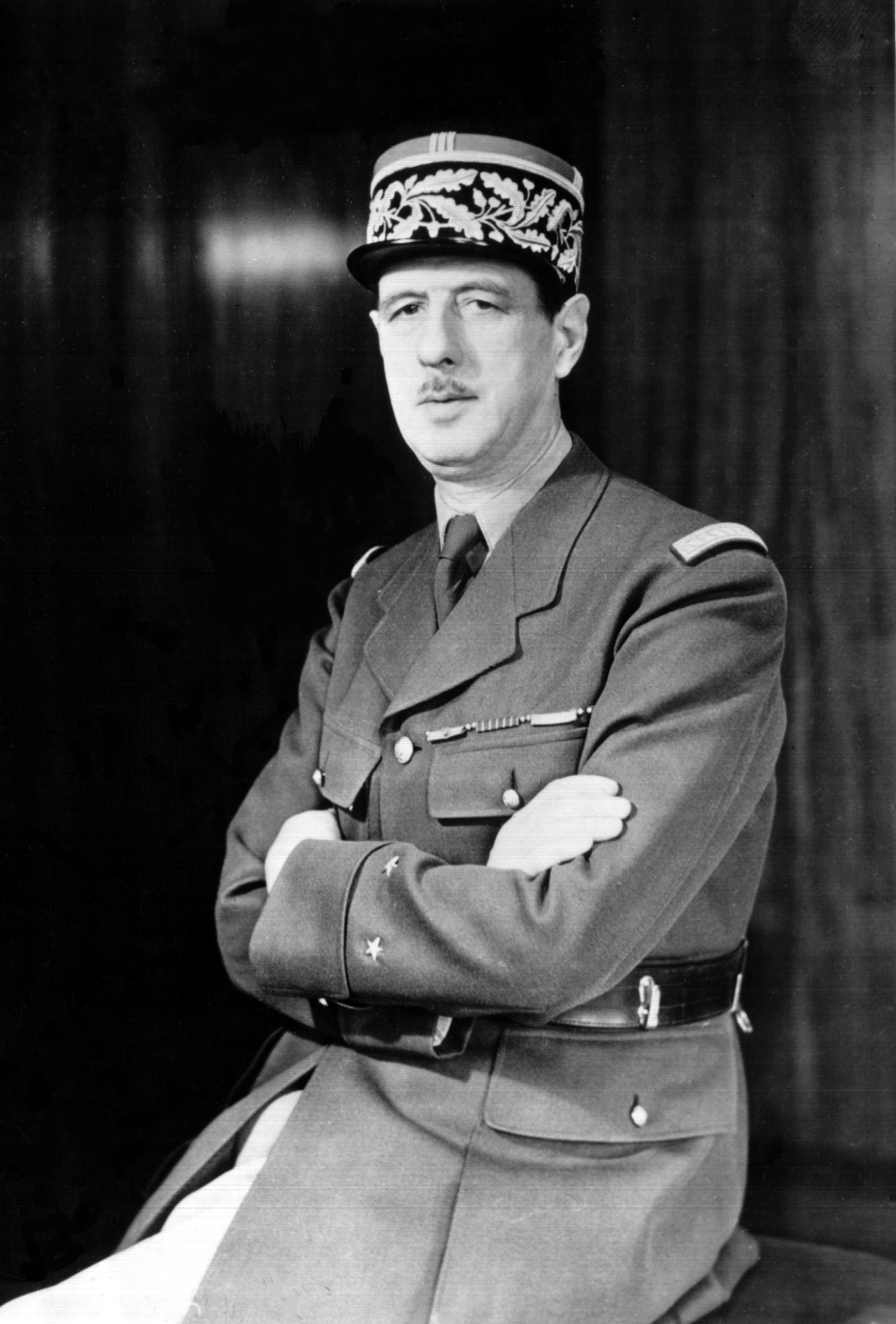
General de Gaulle was the leader of the Free French Movement, but had little time for her work and refused to read the whole of Need for Roots

Initially commissioned by General Charles de Gaulle’s Free French Forces in 1943, the report was never officially implemented. Nevertheless, it gained attention among French intellectuals in the post-war period. Weil’s close connections to thinkers such as Gustave Thibon (who edited and published her works posthumously) helped disseminate her ideas more widely in literary and philosophical circles. De Gaulle was not very impressed, dismissing her recommendations and only half reading most of her reports. Few of Weil's ideas were put into practice during the operations that followed the liberation of France, with one of few direct signs of her influence being that a list of obligations was included along with a list of rights in a French free press release of August 1943.

In 1951, Albert Camus who edited the book after her death wrote that she was "the only great spirit of our times." So taken with the work he wrote that it seemed to him "impossible to imagine the rebirth of Europe without taking into consideration the suggestions outlined in it by Simone Weil." T. S. Eliot, who wrote the introduction to The Need for Roots, praised the work's balanced judgement and good sense and states Weil was an inspiration for his literature. Poet and critic Kenneth Rexroth took a negative view of the book, writing in 1957 that it "was a collection of egregious nonsense" and "a weird, embarrassing relic of a too immediate past."

Weil's first English biographer Richard Rees wrote that The Need for Roots can be described as an investigation into the causes of unhappiness and proposals for its cure. Writing in 1966 he says it contains more of what the present age needs to understand and more of the criticism it needs to listen to than any other writer of century has been able to express.The Times Literary Supplement summarised the book as, about politics in the "widest Aristotelian understanding of the term" and that it displayed an "exceptional originality and breath of human sympathy". For Weil scholar Sian Miles, the book is the most complete expression of Weil's social thought.

== Legacy ==
The Need for Roots has exerted a significant influence on post-war political philosophy, theology, and educational theory and has become an influential text. The Need for Roots also had a significant impact on Christian thought. Although Weil herself remained outside the institutional Church, her spiritual insights were taken seriously by theologians. Pope John Paul II cited Weil as a major influence when he authored the encyclical Laborem exercens concerning work and labor According to Dr Stephen Plant, writing in 1996, Need for Roots remains just as relevant today as it was in the 1940s when the majority of European workers were employed by heavy industry.

Writers inspired by Weil's thought include T.S. Eliot, W. H. Auden, Anne Carson, Seamus Heaney, Czeslaw Milosz, Flannery O’Connor and Susan Sontag. Weil's work has seen renewed interest in reference to contemporary commercial society and what commentators describe as a lack of roots.
