= Rankous =

Town in Syria

Rankous رنكوس
- Town
- Location in Syria
- Coordinates: 33°45′25″N 36°23′21″E
- Country: Syria
- Governorate: Rif Dimashq
- District: al-Tall
- Subdistrict: Rankous

Population (2004 census)
  - Total: 7,717
- Time zone: UTC+2 (EET)
  - Summer (DST): UTC+3 (EEST)

Rankous or Rankus (Arabic: رنكوس) is a Syrian town and summer resort in the province's Damascus countryside (Rif Dimashq) located in Mount Qalamoun (anti-Lebanon) in Syria, 45 km from Damascus, with a total area of 22.277 km ², extends between 1650 and 2150 m. The climate of the town is cool in summer and cold in winter. The rate of rain and snow usually varies between 350 and 650 mm. The mountains surrounding the town are covered with snow in winter. According to the Syria Central Bureau of Statistics (CBS), Rankous had a population of 7,717 in the 2004 census.

The town is famous for the cultivation of fruit trees: apples, pears, cherries, almonds, apricots, and vegetables: potatoes, peas, many types of vegetables. There are many types of livestock Rankous, such as sheep, goats, cows, poultry.

== History ==
There are Rankous historical monuments in the vicinity of the town, caves, old cemeteries and tombs carved and engraved in stone.

In 1838, its inhabitants were noted as being predominantly Sunni Muslims. The town was severely damaged during the clashes between the pro-government forces and the armed opposition during the Syrian civil war.

== People from Rankous ==
- Cheikh Mahmoud Baayoun (Mahmoud Al Rankousi)
- The translator and essayist Mohamed Ali Abdel Jalil

== Bibliography ==
- Robinson, E.; Smith, E. (1841). Biblical Researches in Palestine, Mount Sinai and Arabia Petraea: A Journal of Travels in the year 1838. Vol. 3. Boston: Crocker & Brewster.
