= Ain al-Tinah =

Ain al-Tinah عين التينة
- Village
- Location in Syria
- Coordinates: 33.8162°N 36.5572°E
- Country: Syria
- Governorate: Rif Dimashq
- District: al-Qutayfah
- Subdistrict: Ma'loula

Population (2004 census)
  - Total: 3,206
- Time zone: UTC+2 (EET)
  - Summer (DST): UTC+3 (EEST)

Ain al-Tinah (Arabic: عين التينة) is a Syrian village in the Al-Qutayfah District of the Rif Dimashq Governorate. According to the Syria Central Bureau of Statistics (CBS), Ain al-Tinah had a population of 3,206 in the 2004 census. Its inhabitants are predominantly Sunni Muslims.

== Bibliography ==
- Robinson, E.; Smith, E. (1841). Biblical Researches in Palestine, Mount Sinai and Arabia Petraea: A Journal of Travels in the year 1838. Vol. 3. Boston: Crocker & Brewster.
