= Halboun =

Halboun حلبون Halbun
- Village
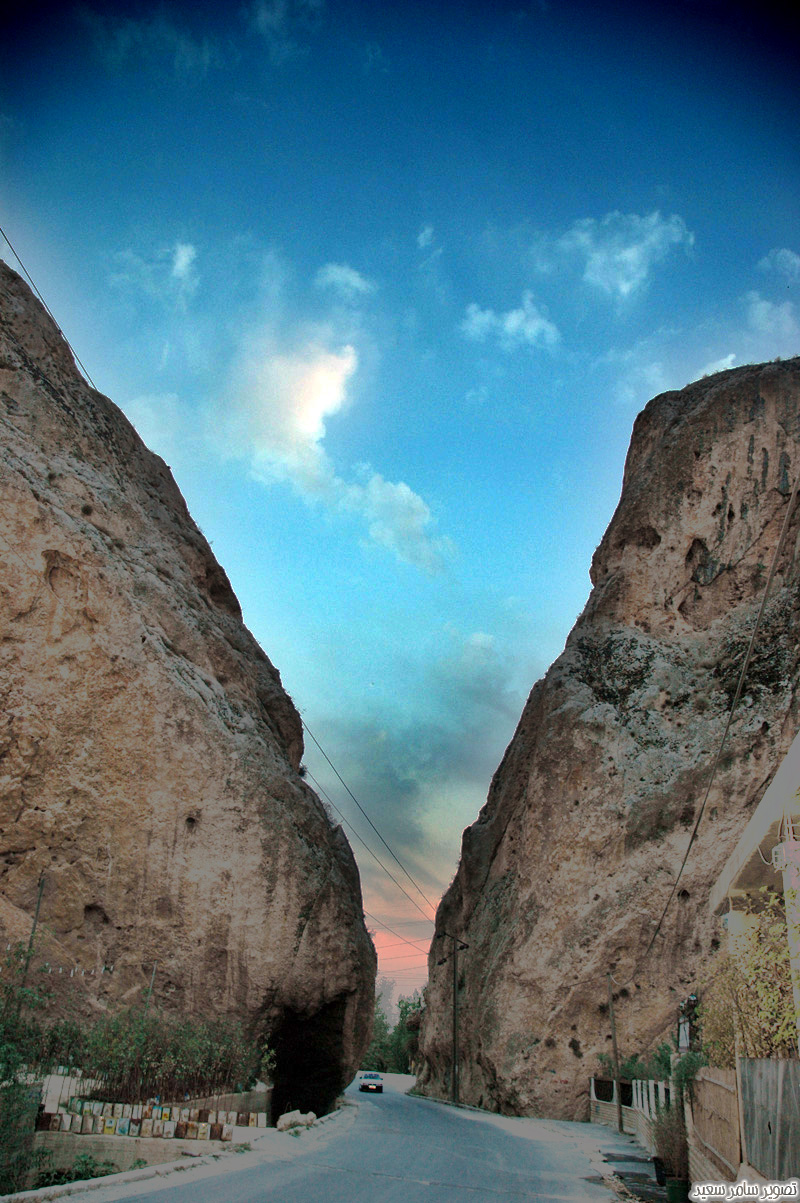
- Halboun

- Location in Syria
- Coordinates: 33°40′N 36°15′E
- Country: Syria
- Governorate: Rif Dimashq
- District: al-Tall
- Subdistrict: al-Tall

Population (2004 census)
  - Total: 6,521
- Time zone: UTC+2 (EET)
  - Summer (DST): UTC+3 (EEST)

Halboun or Halbun (Arabic: حلبون) is a Syrian village in the Al-Tall District of the Rif Dimashq Governorate. According to the Syria Central Bureau of Statistics (CBS), Halboun had a population of 6,521 in the 2004 census. Its inhabitants are predominantly Sunni Muslims.

== History ==
Halboun, which was mentioned as Chalybon (Greek: Χαλυβάν) by Ptolemy and Strabo, was famous for its fine wine, in which it was considered as a luxury to the Persian kings in the Eber-Nari satrapy of the Achaemenid Empire.

There are several Roman ruins found in Halboun, most famously the inscriptions which date back to the reign of Herod Agrippa II.

== Bibliography ==
- Robinson, E.; Smith, E. (1841). Biblical Researches in Palestine, Mount Sinai and Arabia Petraea: A Journal of Travels in the year 1838. Vol. 3. Boston: Crocker & Brewster.
