= Al-Dreij =

Al-Dreij الدريج
- Village
- Location in Syria
- Coordinates: 33.6216°N 36.2605°E
- Country: Syria
- Governorate: Rif Dimashq
- District: al-Tall
- Subdistrict: Al-Tall

Population (2004 census)
  - Total: 1,769
- Time zone: UTC+2 (EET)
  - Summer (DST): UTC+3 (EEST)

Al-Dreij (Arabic: الدريج) is a Syrian village in the Al-Tall District of the Rif Dimashq Governorate. According to the Syria Central Bureau of Statistics (CBS), Al-Dreij had a population of 1,769 as of 2004 census.
