= Al-Tall District =

al-Tall District منطقة التل
- District
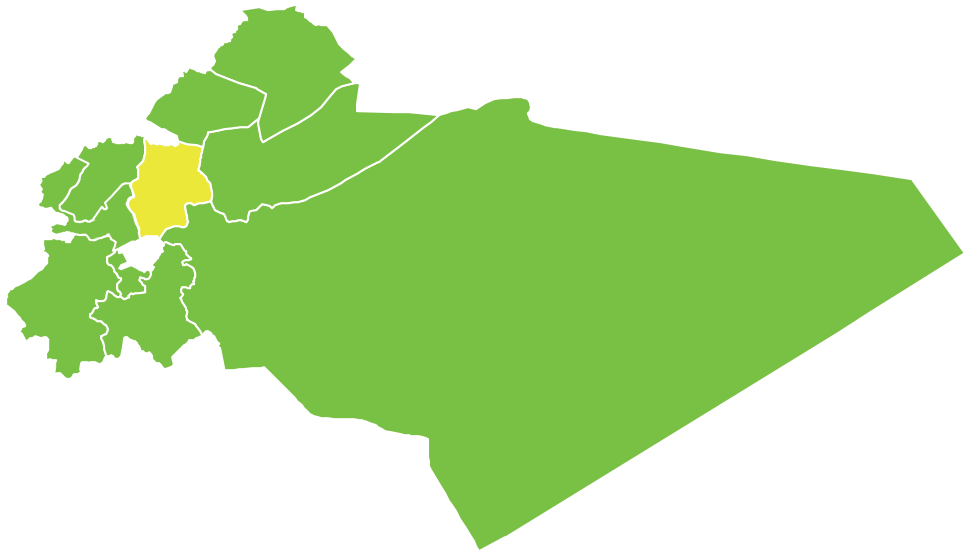
- Map of al-Tall District within Rif Dimashq Governorate
- Coordinates (al-Tall): 33.6°N 36.3°E
- Country: Syria
- Governorate: Rif Dimashq
- Seat: al-Tall
- Subdistricts: 3 nawāḥī

Area
  - Total: 559.06 km^{2} (215.85 sq mi)

Population (2004)
  - Total: 115,937
  - Density: 207.38/km^{2} (537.11/sq mi)
- Geocode: SY0304

al-Tall District (Arabic: منطقة التل, romanized: manṭiqat al-Tall) is a district of the Rif Dimashq Governorate in southern Syria. The administrative centre is the city of al-Tall. At the 2004 census, the district had a population of 115,937. As of July 2023, the population was estimated to be 275,252, of whom 188,263 were IDPS.

== Sub-districts ==
The district of al-Tall is divided into three sub-districts or nawāḥī (population as of 2004 and 2023):

Subdistricts of al-Tall District
Code	Name	Area	Population 2004	Population 2023
SY030400	al-Tall Subdistrict	224.35 km²	85,933	252,863
SY030401	Saidnaya Subdistrict	138.01 km²	18,846	12,419
SY030402	Rankous Subdistrict	196.70 km²	11,158	9,970

== Localities in al-Tall District ==
According to the Central Bureau of Statistics (CBS), the following villages, towns and cities make up the district of al-Tall:

English Name	Arabic Name	Population	Subdistrict
al-Tall	التل	44,597	Al-Tall
Manin	منين	17,521	Al-Tall
Maaraba	معربا	10,290	Al-Tall
Rankous	رنكوس	7,717	Rankous
Badda	بدا	6,564	Saidnaya
Halboun	حلبون	6,521	Al-Tall
Saidnaya	صيدنايا	5,194	Saidnaya
Talfita	تلفيتا	4,082	Al-Tall
Hafeir al-Fouqa	حفير الفوقا	3,441	Saidnaya
Maarat Saidnaya	معرة صيدنايا	3,084	Saidnaya
Hosh Arab	حوش عرب	2,073	Rankous
al-Dreij	الدريج	1,769	Al-Tall
Maarounah	معرونة	1,153	Al-Tall
al-Fayadiyah	الفياضية	785	Rankous
Akoubar	عكوبر	563	Saidnaya
al-Jarniyah	الجرنية	271	Rankous
al-Mahabah	المحبة	100	Rankous
Sabnah	سبنة	94	Rankous
Ayn Dara	عين دره	63	Rankous
al-Nour	النور	55	Rankous
