= Maarat Saidnaya =

Maarat Saidnaya معرة صيدنايا Maaret Saidnaya, Maara
- Village
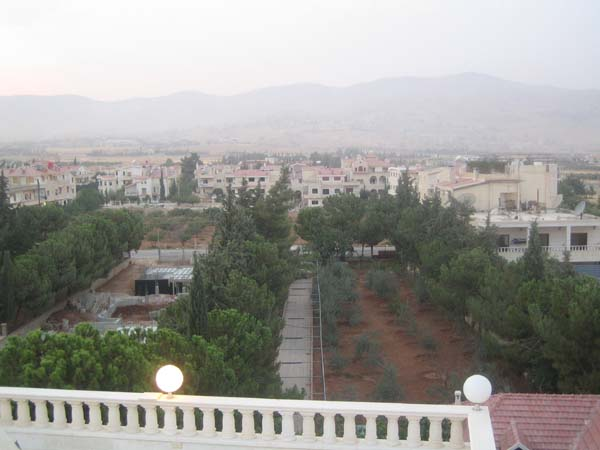

- Location in Syria
- Coordinates: 33°40′9″N 36°22′47″E
- Country: Syria
- Governorate: Rif Dimashq
- District: al-Tall
- Subdistrict: Saidnaya

Population (2004 census)
  - Total: 3,084
- Time zone: UTC+2 (EET)
  - Summer (DST): UTC+3 (EEST)

Maarat Saidnaya, or Maaret Saidnaya (Arabic: معرة صيدنايا) is a mountainous village in Al-Tall District of Damascus's Countryside Rif Dimashq Governorate, Syria. It sets on the plains of the Qalamoun Mountains that are overlooked by nearby city of Saidnaya at 1,200 metres (3,937.00 feet) above sea level, 28 kilometres (17 mi) north of the city of Damascus. According to the Syria Central Bureau of Statistics (CBS), Maarat Saidnaya had a population of 3,084 in the 2004 census.

Located on the mountain side at the town's outskirts, the Shrine of Mar Elias Al-Hai (Shrine of St. Elijah the Living; Arabic: مقام مار الياس الحي; pronounced: "Deir or Makam Mar Elias Al-Hai"), is one of its most famous attractions . Many people come every year to visit this Melkite Greek Catholic Church especially to celebrate St. Elijah day of 20 July.

Notably also, the Mor Ephrem Monastery, consecrated in 1996, is the summer residence of the Patriarch of the Syriac Orthodox Church, along with the church seminary and the recently founded Antioch Syrian University.

== History ==
In 1838, Eli Smith noted Ma'arra as being populated by Catholic Antiochian Greek Christians.

== Bibliography ==
- Robinson, E.; Smith, E. (1841). Biblical Researches in Palestine, Mount Sinai and Arabia Petraea: A Journal of Travels in the year 1838. Vol. 3. Boston: Crocker & Brewster.
