= Manin, Syria =

Town in southern Syria

Mneen منين
- Town
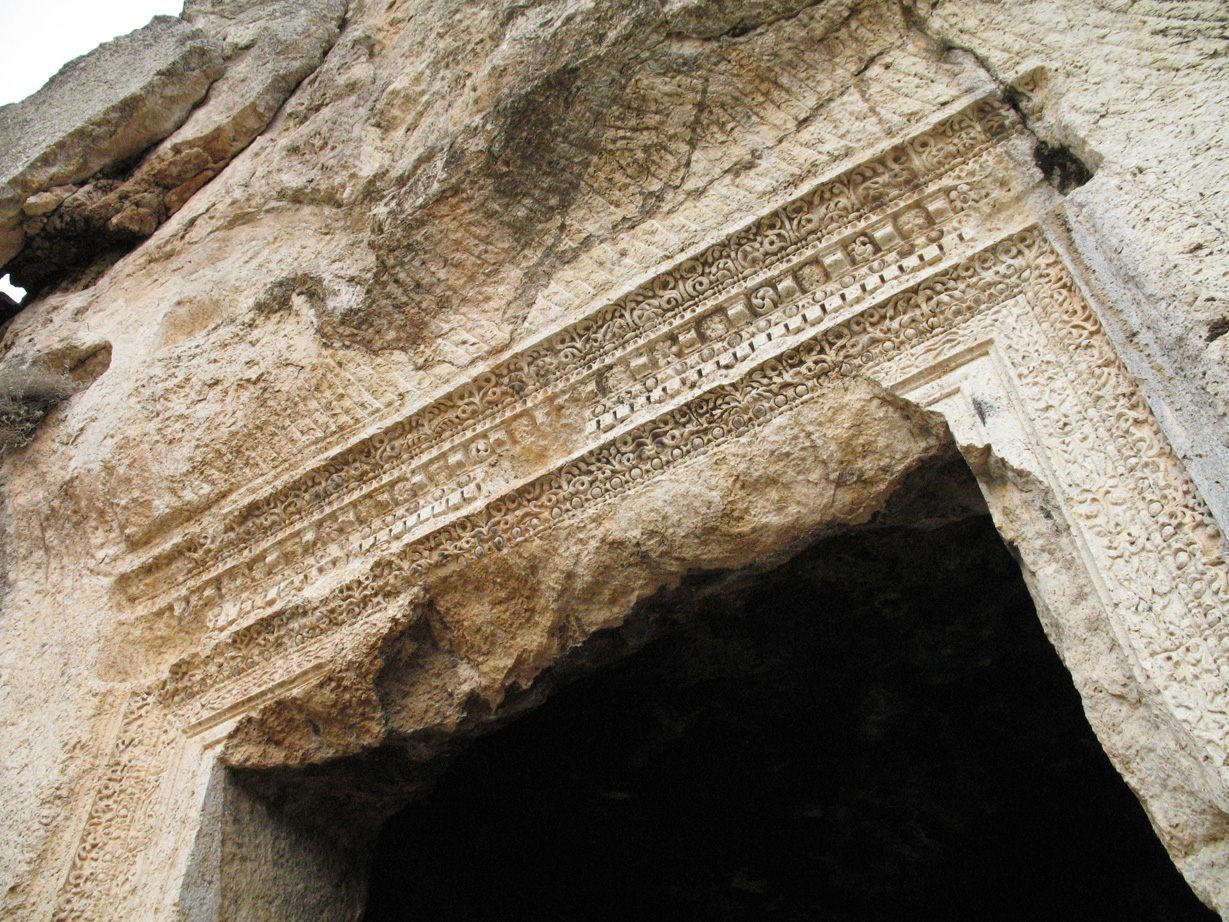
- Temple of Mar Takla near Manin

- Location within Syria
- Coordinates: 33°38′32″N 36°17′52″E
- Country: Syria
- Governorate: Rif Dimashq
- District: al-Tall
- Subdistrict: al-Tall
- Elevation: 1,200 m (3,900 ft)

Population (2004 census)
  - Total: 17,521
- Time zone: UTC+2 (EET)
  - Summer (DST): UTC+3 (EEST)

Manin or Ain Manin (Arabic: منين) is a small town in southern Syria about 18 kilometers north of Damascus. Manin is a popular tourist site, surrounded by seven small mountains with the Manin valley between them. The Manin river flows from a mountain dubbed "Al-Ain" (Arabic : العين) and continues until it reaches the suburbs of Damascus. The town has an elevation of roughly 1,200 meters above sea level. According to the Syria Central Bureau of Statistics, Manin had a population of 17,521 in the 2004 census. In the 1960s it was reported to be a relatively large village with 3,200 inhabitants. Its inhabitants are predominantly Sunni Muslims.

Recent discoveries at another mountain named (Mar Takla) (From Arabic : مار تقلا, Saint Thecla) show that the town had a long history, especially in the Roman and Byzantine periods, with two temples carved in the mountain's stone as well as many houses and tombs. St. Helena had two churches constructed in Manin.

== Bibliography ==
- Boulanger, Robert (1966). The Middle East, Lebanon, Syria, Jordan, Iraq, Iran. Hachette.
- Robinson, E.; Smith, E. (1841). Biblical Researches in Palestine, Mount Sinai and Arabia Petraea: A Journal of Travels in the year 1838. Vol. 3. Boston: Crocker & Brewster.
