= Maaraba, Rif Dimashq =

Maaraba معربا
- Village
- Location in Syria
- Coordinates: 33°34′39″N 36°17′49″E
- Country: Syria
- Governorate: Rif Dimashq Governorate
- District: al-Tall
- Subdistrict: al-Tall

Population (2004 census)
  - Total: 10,290
- Time zone: UTC+2 (EET)
  - Summer (DST): UTC+3 (EEST)

Maaraba (Arabic: معربا) is a Syrian village in the Al-Tall District of the Rif Dimashq Governorate. According to the Syria Central Bureau of Statistics (CBS), Maaraba had a population of 10,290 in the 2004 census. Its inhabitants are predominantly Sunni Muslims.

As a result of the Syrian Civil War which meant huge refugee waves, the estimated population in 2018 was around 300,000.

== Bibliography ==
- Robinson, E.; Smith, E. (1841). Biblical Researches in Palestine, Mount Sinai and Arabia Petraea: A Journal of Travels in the year 1838. Vol. 3. Boston: Crocker & Brewster.
