= Veneration =

Act of honoring a person or article for religious reasons

Veneration (Latin: veneratio; Greek: προσκύνησις proskýnēsis (Note: Etymologically "to venerate" derives from the Latin verb venerare, meaning 'to regard with reverence and respect'.)) is the practice of honoring people and articles of religious significance, for example, the veneration of saints and the veneration of relics.

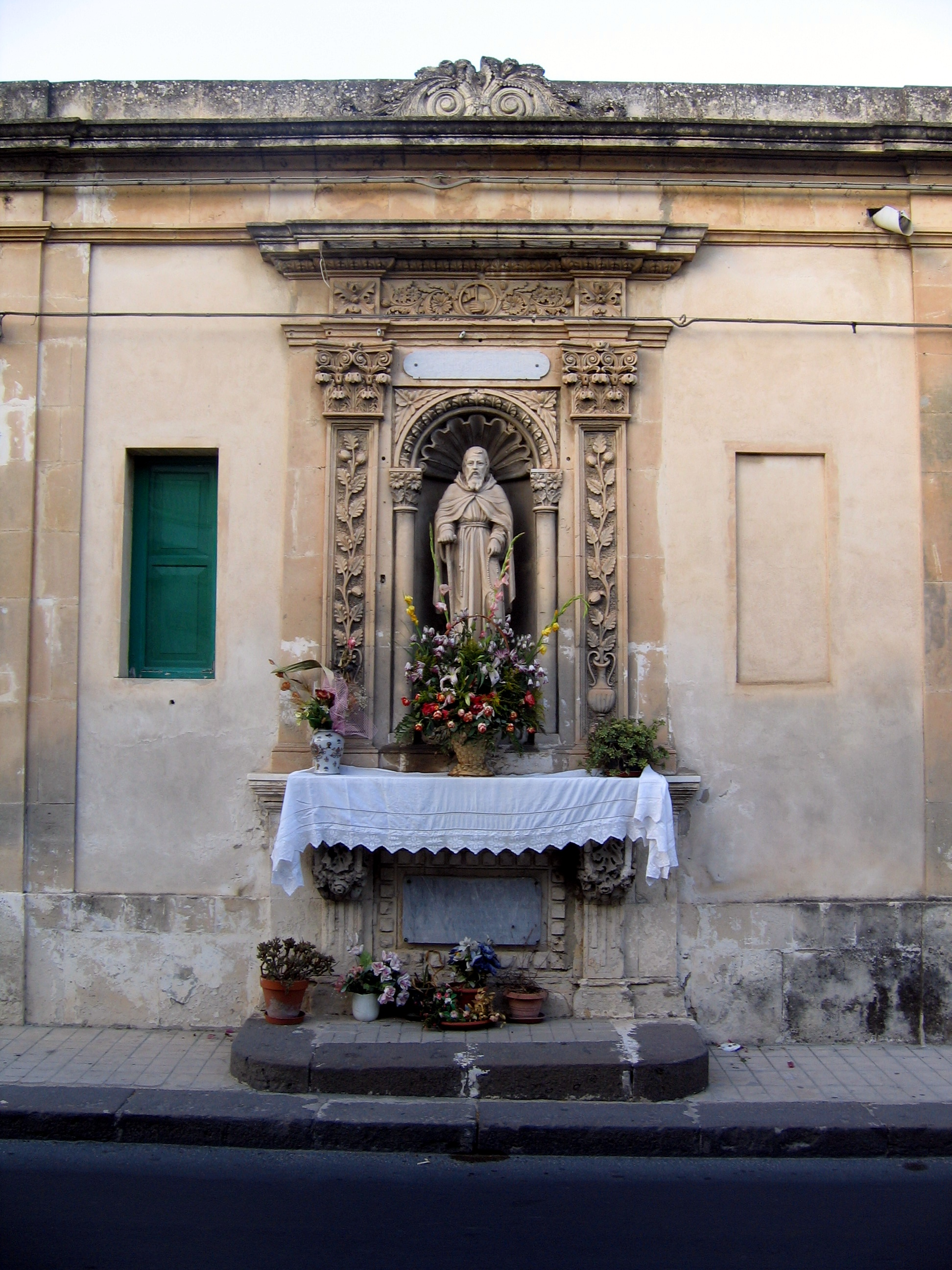
A statue of Conrad of Piacenza in a niche in the side wall of Noto Cathedral, Sicily. The cathedral houses the relics of the patron saint of Noto.

To venerate a saint is to honour a person who has been identified as having a high degree of sanctity or holiness. Angels are shown similar veneration in many religions. Veneration of saints is practiced, formally or informally, by adherents of some branches of all major religions, including Christianity, Judaism, Hinduism, Islam, Buddhism and Jainism.

Within Christianity, veneration is practiced by groups such as the Catholic Church, Eastern Orthodox Church, and the Oriental Orthodox Churches, all of which have varying types of canonization or glorification processes. The Catholic church teaches that believers have "always venerated the divine Scriptures just as [they] venerate the body of the Lord". In Catholicism and Orthodoxy, veneration for saints is shown outwardly by respectfully kissing, bowing or making the sign of the cross before a saint's icon, relics, or statue, or by going on pilgrimage to sites associated with saints. The Lutheran churches and Anglican churches commemorate saints on feast days throughout the liturgical year and often name churches after saints. In general, the veneration of saints is not practiced by Reformed Christians and Jehovah's Witnesses, as many adherents of both groups believe the practice amounts to idolatry.

Hinduism has a long tradition of veneration of saints, expressed toward various gurus and teachers of sanctity, both living and dead. Branches of Buddhism include formal liturgical worship of saints, with Mahayana Buddhism classifying degrees of sainthood.

In Islam, veneration of saints is practiced by some of the adherents of traditional Islam (Sufis, for example), and in many parts of places like Turkey, Egypt, South Asia, and Southeast Asia. Other sects, such as Wahhabists, etc. abhor the practice.

In Judaism, there is no classical or formal recognition of saints, but there is a long history of reverence shown toward biblical heroes and martyrs. Jews in some regions, for example in Morocco, have a long and widespread tradition of saint veneration, as do Hasidic Jews.

== Buddhism ==
In major Buddhist traditions, Theravada and Mahayana, those who have achieved a high degree of enlightenment are recognized as arhats. Mahayana Buddhism particularly gives emphasis to the power of saints to aid ordinary people on the path to enlightenment. Those who have reached enlightenment and have delayed their own complete enlightenment in order to help others are called Bodhisattvas. Mahayana Buddhism has formal liturgical practices for venerating saints, along with very specific levels of sainthood. Tibetan Buddhists venerate especially holy lamas, such as the Dalai Lama, as saints.

== Christianity ==
Veneration towards those who were considered holy began in early Christianity, with the martyrs first being given special honor. Official commemoration of saints in churches began as early as the first century. Paul the Apostle mentioned saints by name in his writings. Icons depicting saints were created in the catacombs. The Orthodox Church of Byzantium began liturgical commemoration very early, and even in Rome, commemoration is documented in the third century. Over time, the honor also began to be given to those Christians who lived lives of holiness and sanctity. Various denominations venerate and determine saints in different ways, with some having a formal beatification or glorification process.

=== Latria, hyperdulia, protodulia and dulia ===
Christian theologians have long adopted the terms latria for the type of worship due to God alone, and dulia and proskynesis for the veneration given to angels, saints, relics and icons.

Catholic and Eastern Orthodox theologies also include the term hyperdulia, paid to the Virgin Mary. Some theologians introduced another term for her bridegroom, Saint Joseph, called protodulia, but this distinction has not been as generally adopted into the terminology as hyperdulia. The Doctor of the Church Thomas Aquinas specifies that hyperdulia is the same type of veneration as dulia, only given in a greater degree; both remain distinct from latria.

=== Catholicism ===
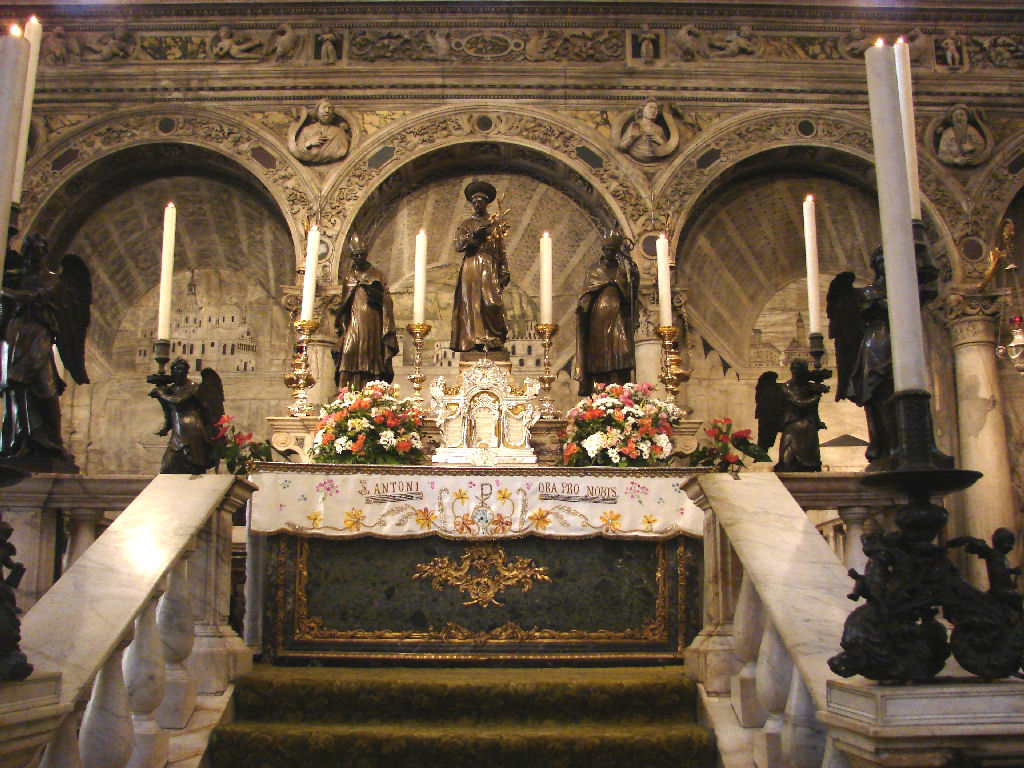
Tomb of Saint Anthony in Padua

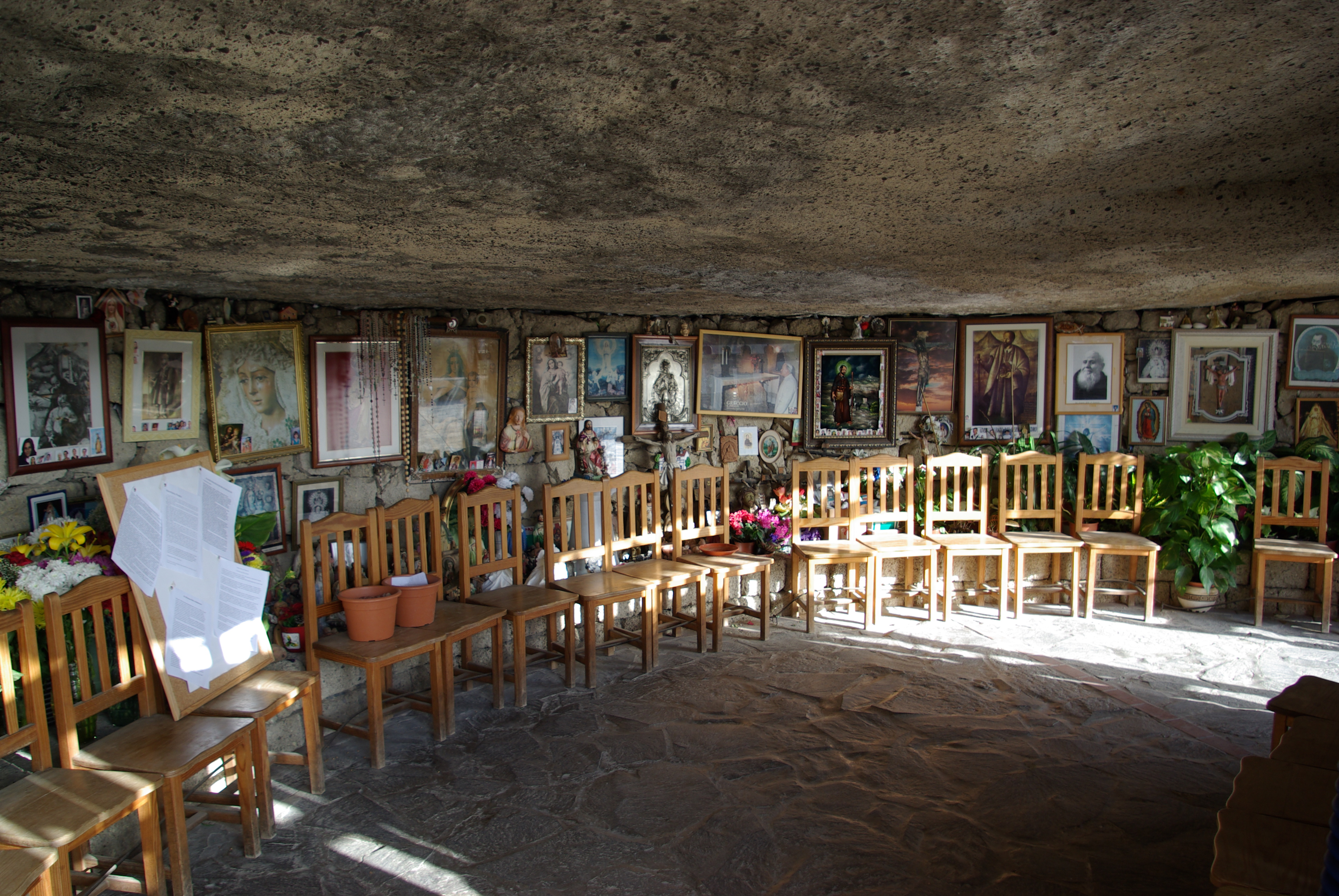
Cave of Santo Hermano Pedro in Tenerife, Spain (veneration of a place associated with a saint).

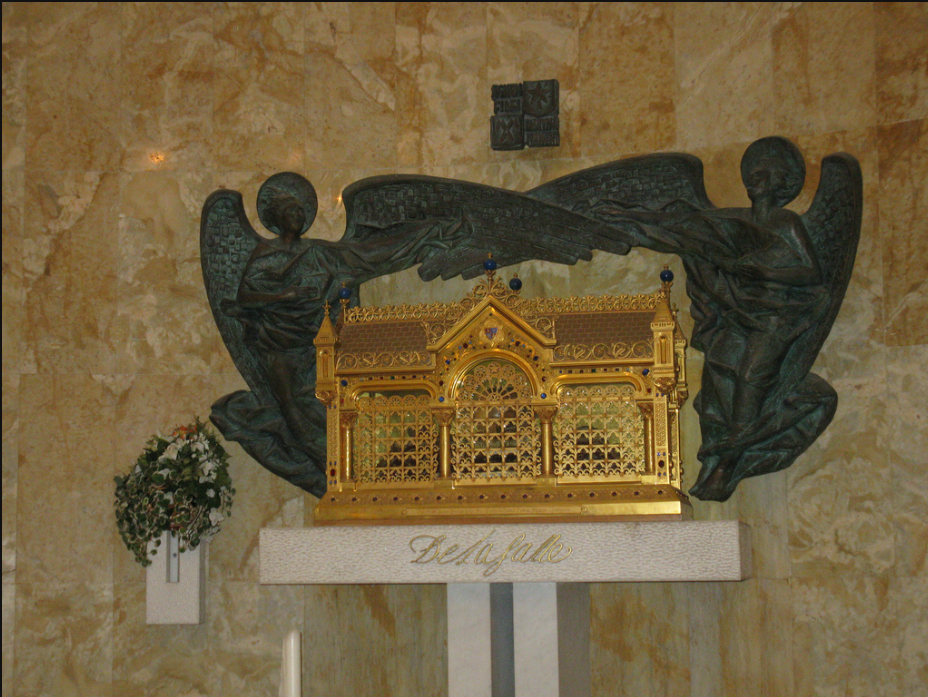
Relics of Saint Jean-Baptiste de La Salle in Rome

In Catholicism, veneration is a type of honor distinct from the true worship (veritable adoration), which is due to God alone. According to Mark Miravelle, of the Franciscan University of Steubenville, the English word "worship" has been associated with both veneration and adoration:

As Thomas Aquinas explained, adoration, which is known as latria in classical theology, is the worship and homage that is rightly offered to God alone. It is the manifestation of submission, and acknowledgement of dependence, appropriately shown towards the excellence of an uncreated divine person and to his absolute Lordship. It is the worship of the creator that God alone deserves.

Veneration, known as dulia in classical theology, is the honor and reverence appropriately due to the excellence of a created person. Excellence exhibited by created beings likewise deserves recognition and honor.

Historically, schools of theology have used the term "worship" as a general term which included both adoration and veneration. They would distinguish between "worship of adoration" and "worship of veneration". The word "worship" (in a similar way to how the liturgical term "cult" is traditionally used) was not synonymous with adoration, but could be used to introduce either adoration or veneration. Hence Catholic sources will sometimes use the term "worship" not to indicate adoration, but only the worship of veneration given to Mary and the saints.

According to the Catechism of the Catholic Church:

The Christian veneration of images is not contrary to the first commandment which proscribes idols. Indeed, "the honor rendered to an image passes to its prototype", and "whoever venerates an image venerates the person portrayed in it". The honor paid to sacred images is a "respectful veneration", not the adoration due to God alone:

Religious worship is not directed to images in themselves, considered as mere things, but under their distinctive aspect as images leading us on to God incarnate. The movement toward the image does not terminate in it as image, but tends toward that whose image it is.

In the Roman Catechism, a more lengthy statement on The Honour and Invocation of the Saints is available.

Catholic tradition has a well established philosophy for the veneration of Mary in the Catholic Church via the field of Mariology with Pontifical schools such as the Marianum specifically devoted to this task.

For the doctrine of the Catholic Church, in addition to the dogma of her Divine Motherhood, the Mother of God "Theotokos" was the subject of three other dogmas:

1. Immaculate Conception (absence of the original sin, by grace of God)
2. Perpetual virginity (before, during, and after the birth of Jesus, until her Assumption)
3. Assumption (in body and soul to Heaven).

The theological grounding for protodulia is rooted in several papal documents and the long-standing tradition of the church:

1. Pope Pius IX proclaimed Saint Joseph the Patron of the Universal Church in 1870.
2. Pope Leo XIII emphasized special role of Saint Joseph in the Church in his encyclical Quamquam pluries (1889), where he called for greater devotion to him.
3. Pope Pius XII further affirmed this devotion by instituting the feast of Saint Joseph the Worker in 1955.

In the Catholic Church, there are many different forms of veneration of saints, such as a pilgrimages (e.g. those of Saint Peter's tomb (Vatican), Basilica of Saint Anthony of Padua (Italy), Santiago de Compostela Cathedral (Spain), or Church of the Holy Sepulchre (Israel)). It is also usual to make a pilgrimage to places associated with the life of a saint, such as the Cave of Santo Hermano Pedro (Spain), the Cave of the Apocalypse (Greece) or the Aya Tekla Church (Turkey). Veneration of images and relics; Lord of Miracles (Peru), the Virgin of Guadalupe and Saint Jude Thaddeus (Mexico), Holy Dexter (Hungary), Reliquary of the Three Kings (Germany), etc.

Not (explicitly) mentioning the word "Hyperdulia", Lumen Gentium, an apostolic constitution of the Second Vatican Council, affirms:

Placed by the grace of God, as God's Mother, next to her Son, and exalted above all angels and men, Mary intervened in the mysteries of Christ and is justly honored by a special cult in the Church. Clearly from earliest times the Blessed Virgin is honored under the title of Mother of God, under whose protection the faithful took refuge in all their dangers and necessities. Hence after the Synod of Ephesus the cult of the people of God toward Mary wonderfully increased in veneration and love, in invocation and imitation, according to her own prophetic words: "All generations shall call me blessed, because He that is mighty hath done great things to me".

— LG 66

The entire body of the faithful pours forth instant supplications to the Mother of God and Mother of men that she, who aided the beginnings of the Church by her prayers, may now, exalted as she is above all the angels and saints, intercede before her Son in the fellowship of all the saints, [...]

— LG 69

Saint Joseph is mentioned in a unique passage:

Our union with the Church in heaven is put into effect in its noblest manner especially in the sacred Liturgy, wherein the power of the Holy Spirit acts upon us through sacramental signs. [...] Celebrating the Eucharistic sacrifice therefore, we are most closely united to the Church in heaven in communion with and venerating the memory first of all of the glorious ever-Virgin Mary, of Blessed Joseph and the blessed apostles and martyrs and of all the saints.

— LG 50

=== Oriental Orthodoxy ===
In the Syriac Orthodox Church liturgical service, the Hail Mary is pronounced as a prefatory prayer after the Our Father, and before the priest's entrance to the chancel. The name of the Blessed Virgin Mary has also been probably used for the sanctification of altars, above the name of all other saints.

=== Eastern Orthodoxy ===
In the Eastern Orthodox Church, veneration of the saints is an important element of worship. Most services are closed with the words "Most Holy Theotokos, save us!" and would use troparions and kontakions to venerate the saint of the day. This practice of venerating saints both through praise and by means of their icons is defended in John Damascene's book On Holy Images, and was the subject of the Second Council of Nicaea.

=== Protestantism ===
==== Evangelical-Lutheranism and Anglicanism ====
Lutheranism and certain forms of Anglicanism allow the veneration of saints in a manner similar to Catholicism. Throughout the liturgical year, the Lutheran and Anglican churches commemorate feast days that honour the saints. Churches are named in honour of the saints.

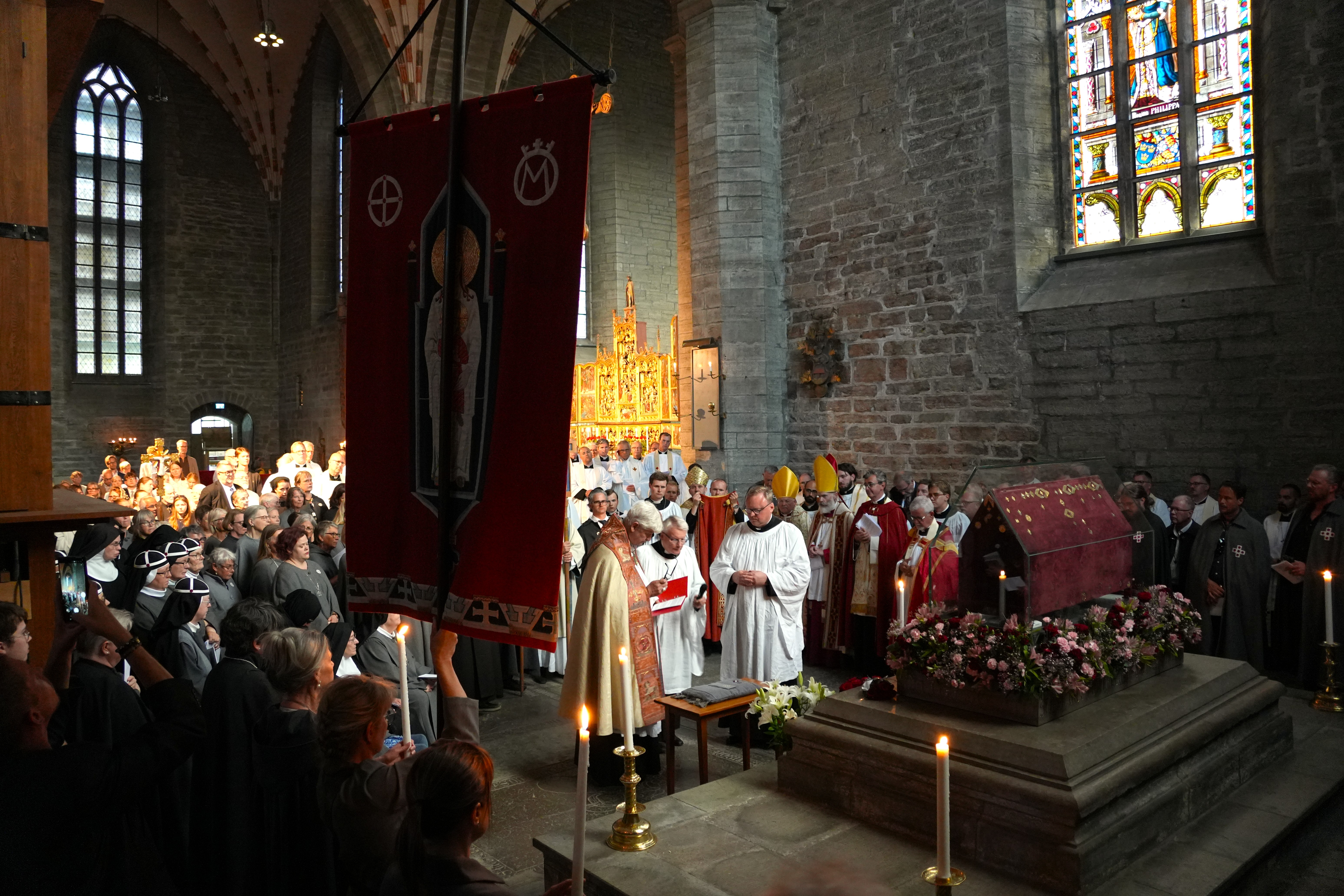
An Evangelical-Lutheran Mass of the Societas Sanctae Birgittae at the relics of St Bridget of Sweden in Vadstena Abbey Church

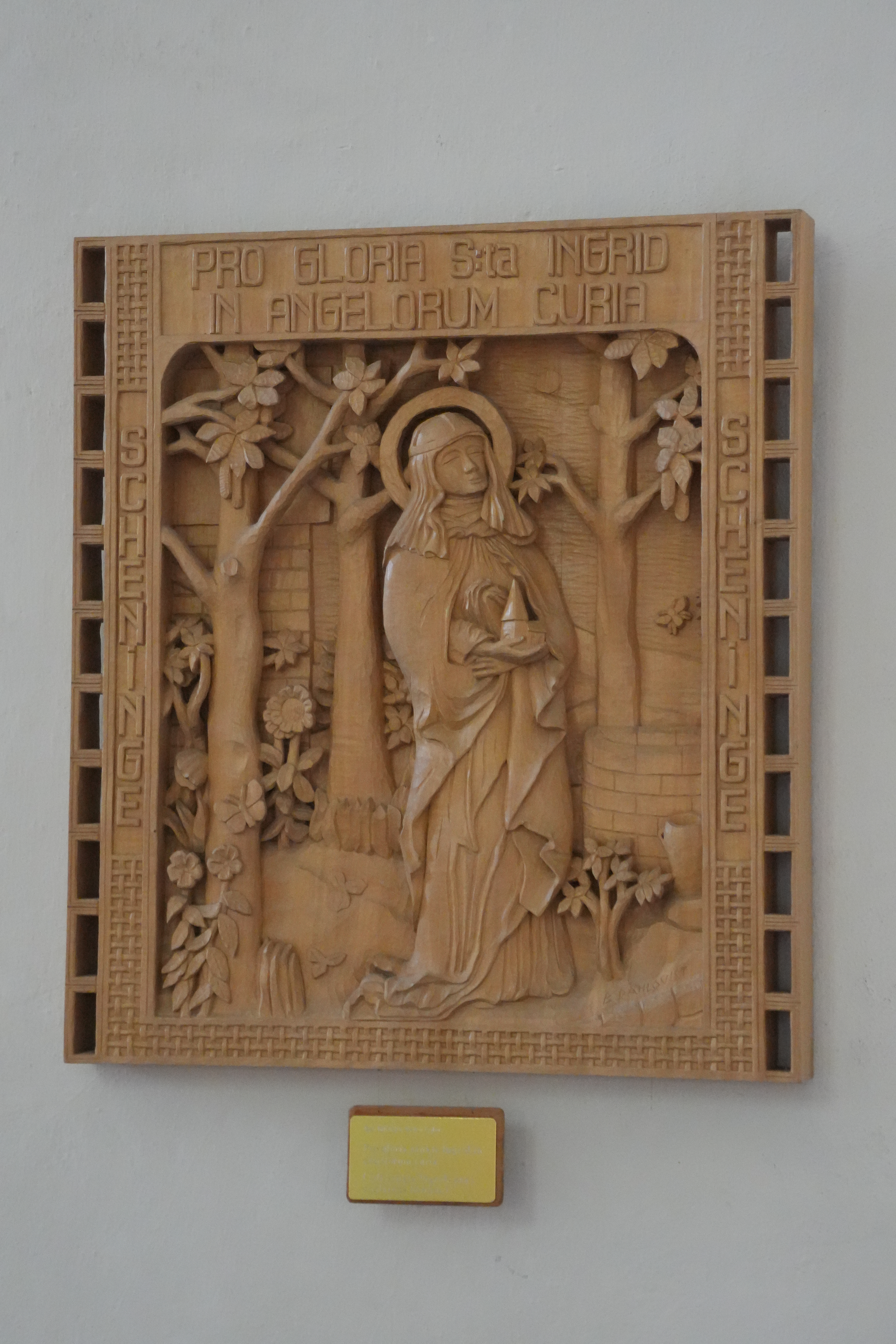
A wooden panel depicting St Ingrid at the Evangelical-Lutheran Church of Our Lady in Skänninge

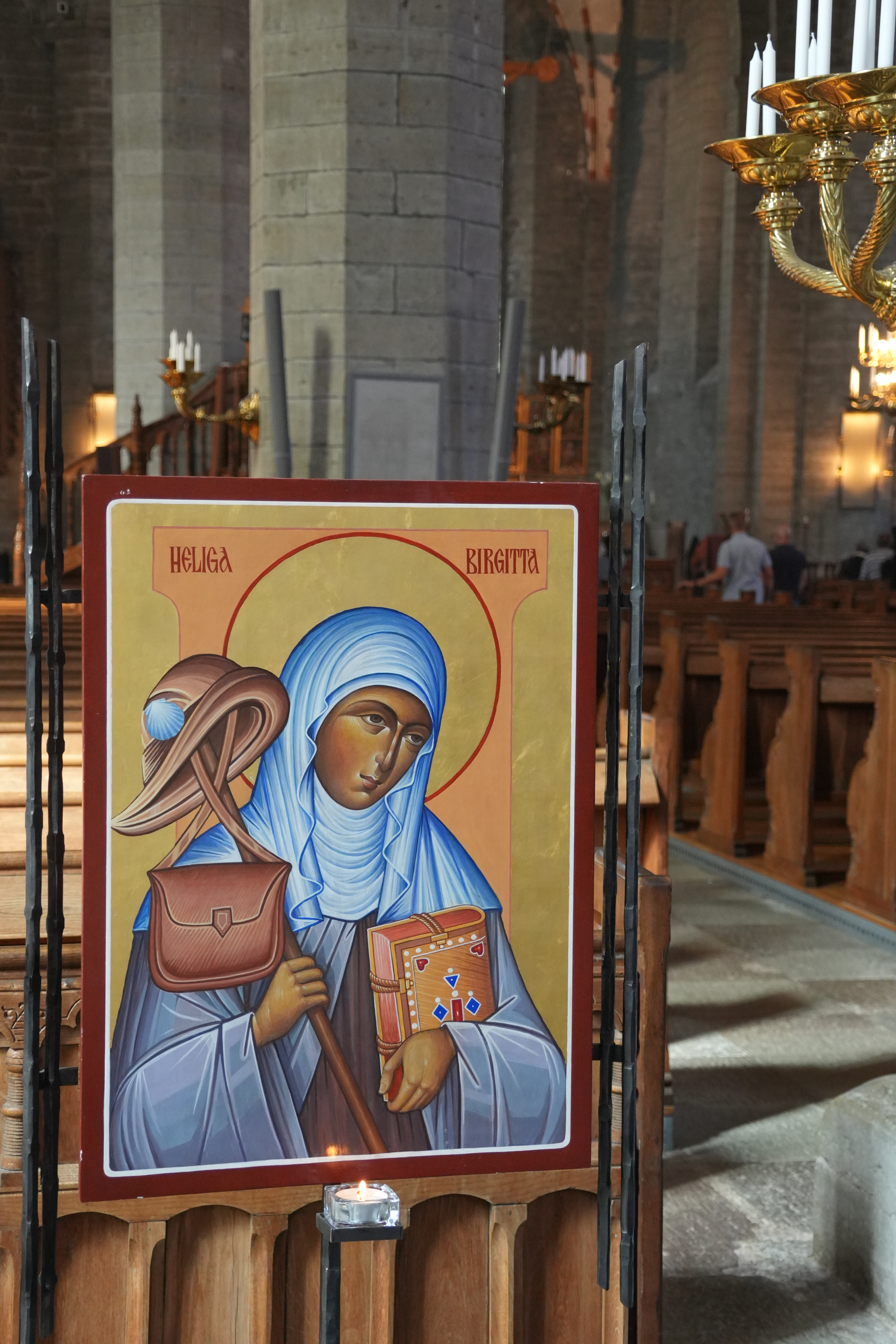
An Evangelical-Lutheran icon to St Bridget of Sweden in Vadstena Abbey Church

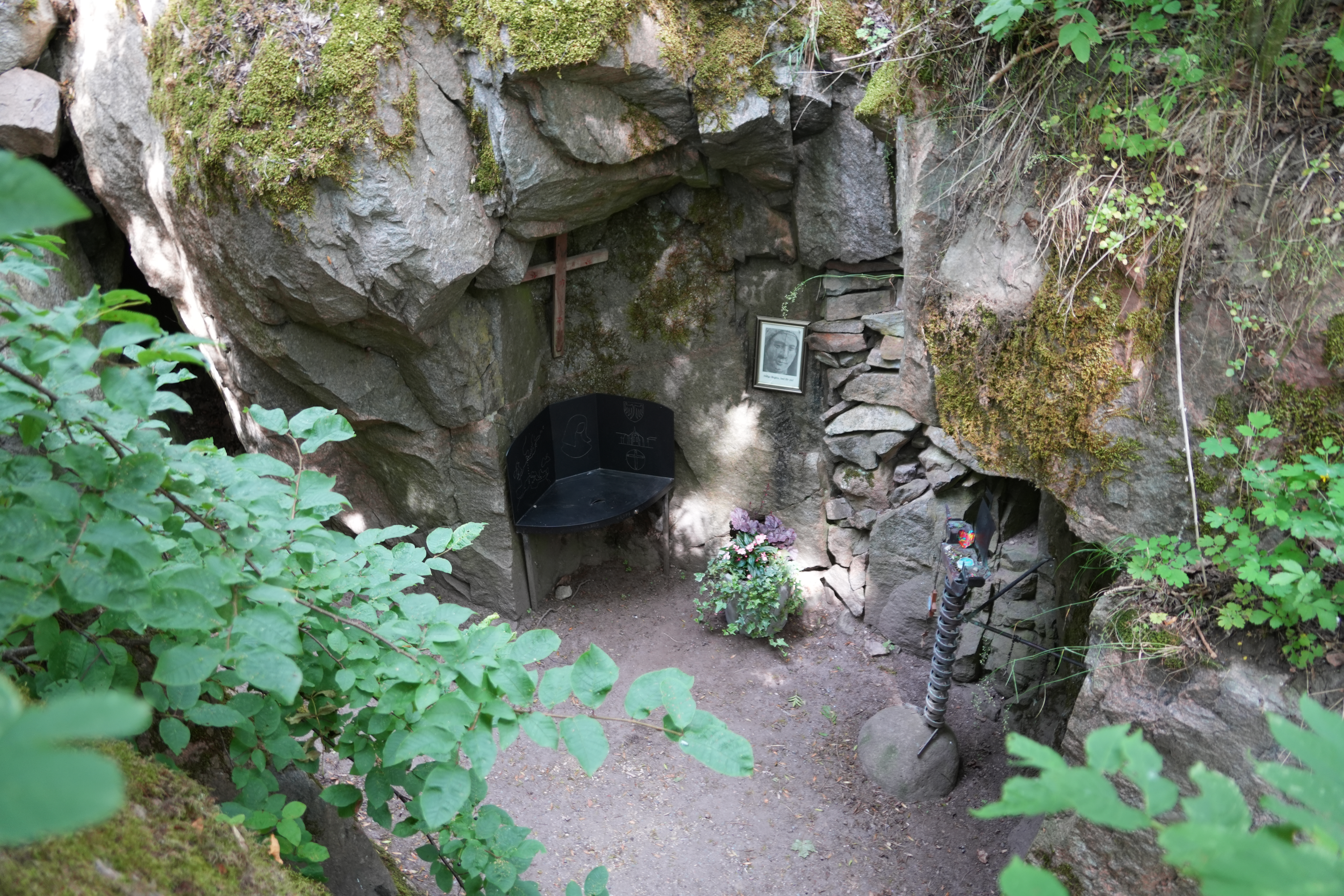
An outdoor Evangelical-Lutheran shrine to St Bridget of Sweden in Finsta, Sweden

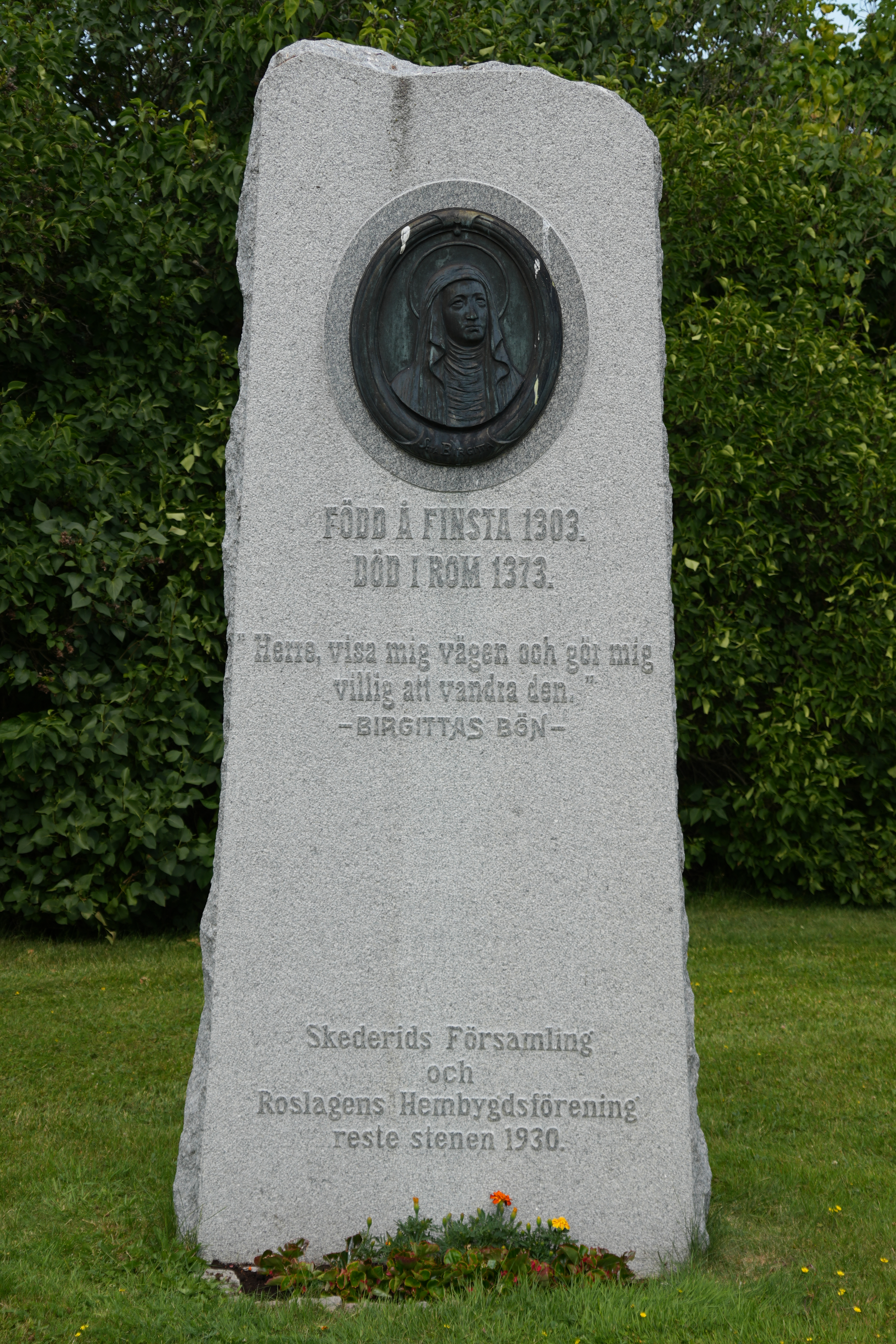
A memorial plaque to St Bridget at Skederid Church (Evangelical-Lutheran) in Norrtälje, Sweden

==== Reformed Christianity and Methodism ====
In Reformed churches, veneration is sometimes considered to amount to the sin of idolatry, and the related practice of canonization to amount to the heresy of apotheosis. Reformed theology usually denies that any real distinction between veneration and worship could be made, and claims that the practice of veneration distracts the Christian soul from its true object, the worship of God. In his Institutes of the Christian Religion, John Calvin writes that "(t)he distinction of what is called dulia and latria was invented for the very purpose of permitting divine honours to be paid to angels and dead men with apparent impunity".

=== Bible ===
In terms of venerating relics of saints, two verses are frequently mentioned:

'Once while some Israelites were burying a man, suddenly they saw a band of raiders; so they threw the man's body into Elisha's tomb. When the body touched Elisha's bones, the man came to life and stood up on his feet.' (2 Kings 13:21, NIV).

'God did extraordinary miracles through Paul, so that even handkerchiefs and aprons that had touched him were taken to the sick, and their illnesses were cured and the evil spirits left them.' (Acts 19:11–12: NIV).

The deuterocanonical Book of Sirach also briefly discusses venerating the memory of patriarchs and prophets: "Let us now praise men of renown, and our fathers in their generation" (44:1). "And their names continue for ever, the glory of the holy men remaining unto their children" (44:15).

==== Support ====
St. Augustine, St. Ambrose, and others, give accounts of miracles that occurred at the graves of St. Stephen, St. Felix of Nola, St. Gervasius, and many others, in post-Biblical times. Such miraculous events are seen as divine favor for the veneration of relics.

== Hinduism ==
Hinduism has a longstanding and living tradition of reverence toward sants (saints) and mahatmas (ascended masters), with the line often blurring between humanity and divinity in the cases of godmen and godwomen. The Bhakti movements popularized devotion to saintly figures such as sadhus, babas, and gurus as models showing the way to liberation.

== Islam ==
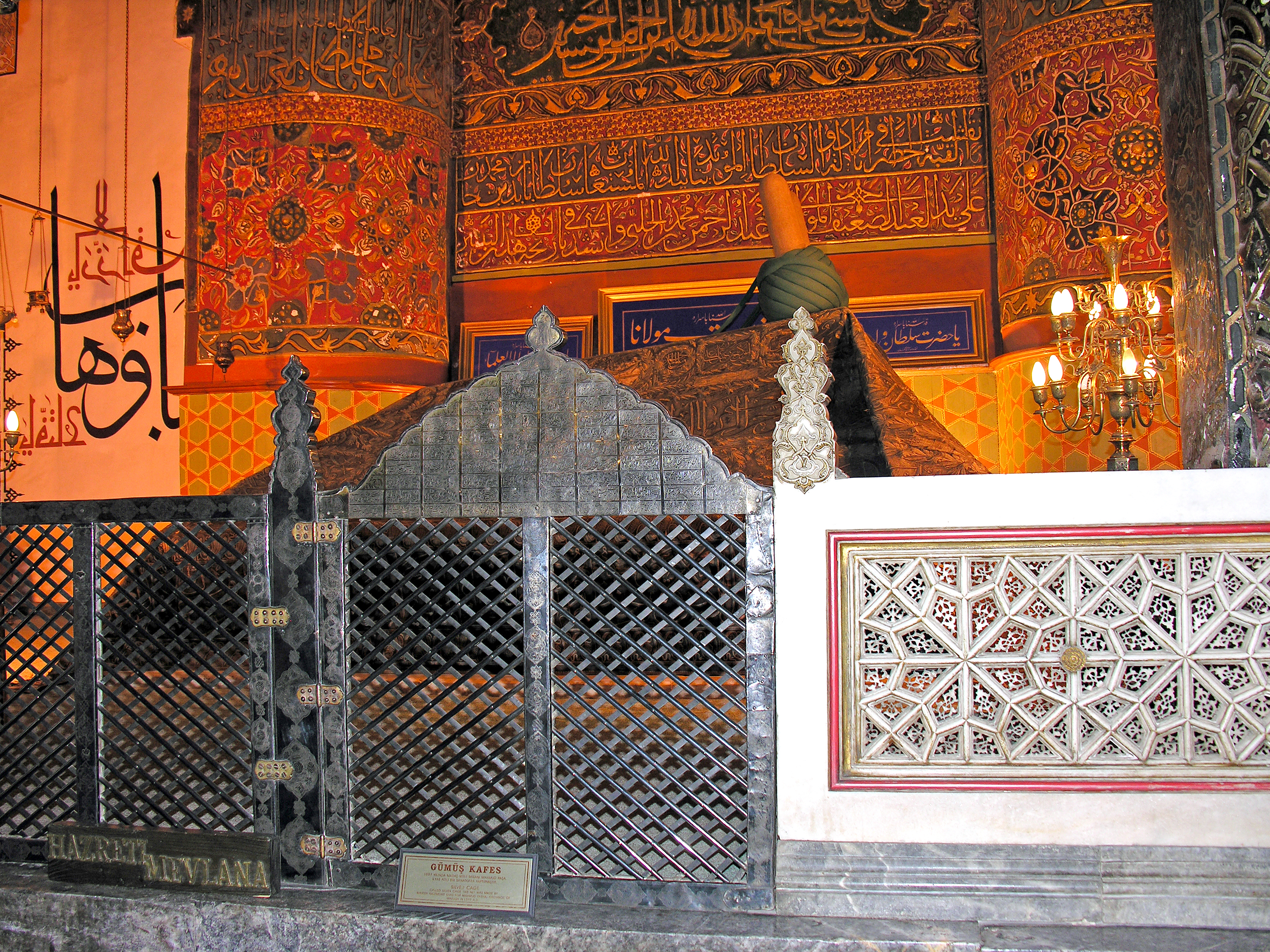
Tomb of Jalal ad-Din Muhammad Rumi in Konya, Turkey

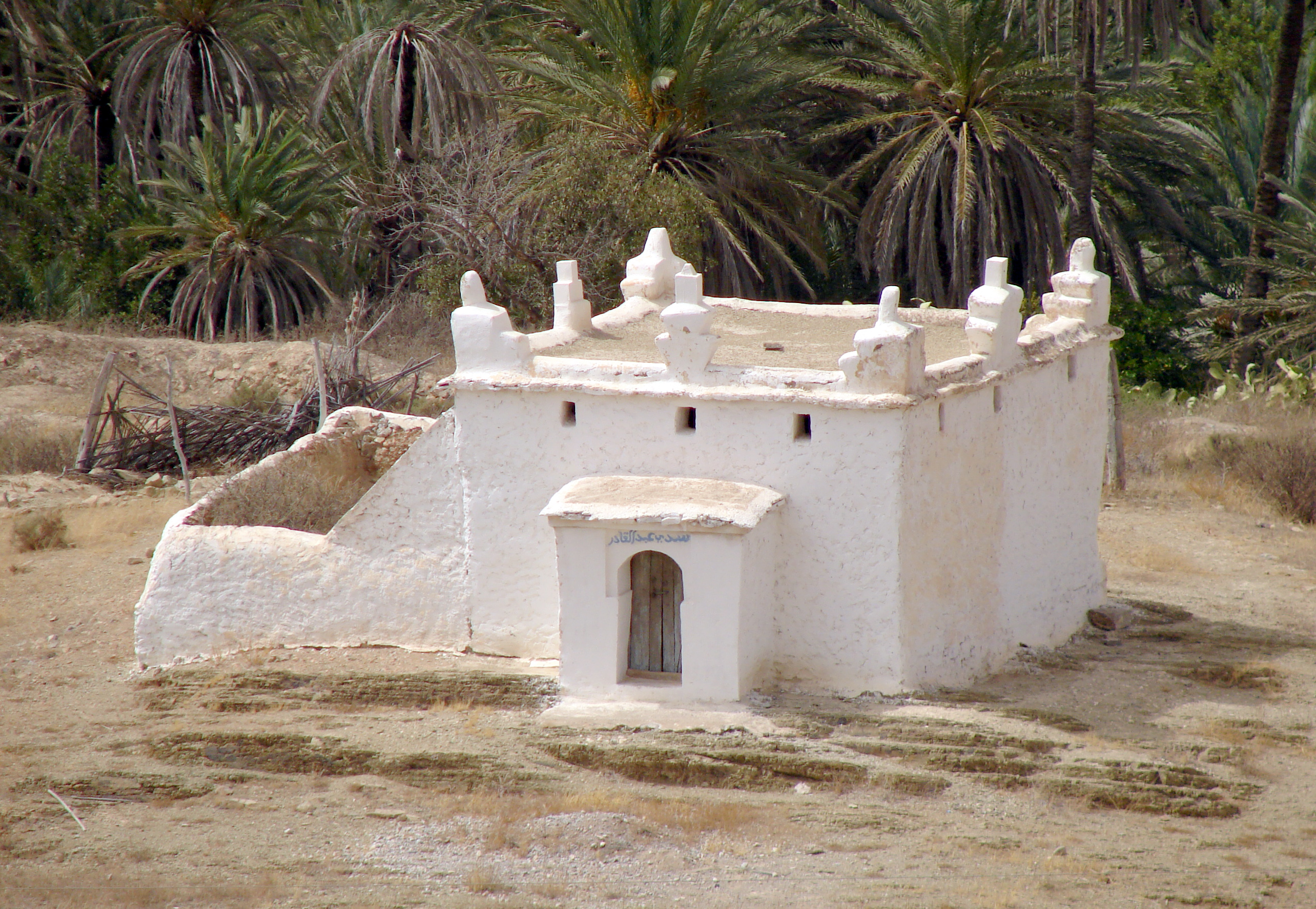
Tomb of a marabout, southern Morocco

Islam has had a rich history of veneration of saints (often called wali, which literally means "Friend [of God]"), which has declined in some parts of the Islamic world in the twentieth century due to the influence of the various streams of Salafism. In Sunni Islam, the veneration of saints became a very common form of religious celebration early on, and saints came to be defined in the eighth-century as a group of "special people chosen by God and endowed with exceptional gifts, such as the ability to work miracles." The classical Sunni scholars came to recognize and honor these individuals as venerable people who were both "loved by God and developed a close relationship of love to Him." The vast majority of saints venerated in the classical Sunni world were the Sufis, who were all Sunni mystics who belonged to one of the four orthodox legal schools of Sunni law.

Veneration of saints eventually became one of the most widespread Sunni practices for more than a millennium, before it was opposed in the twentieth century by the Salafi movement, whose various streams regard it as "being both un-Islamic and backwards ... rather than the integral part of Islam which they were for over a millennium." In a manner similar to the Protestant Reformation, the specific traditional practices which Salafism has tried to curtail in both Sunni and Shia contexts include those of the veneration of saints, visiting their graves, seeking their intercession, and honoring their relics. As Christopher Taylor has remarked: "[Throughout Islamic history] a vital dimension of Islamic piety was the veneration of Muslim saints.... [due, however to] certain strains of thought within the Islamic tradition itself, particularly pronounced in the nineteenth and the twentieth centuries ... [some modern day] Muslims have either resisted acknowledging the existence of Muslim saints altogether or have viewed their presence and veneration as unacceptable deviations."

== Judaism ==
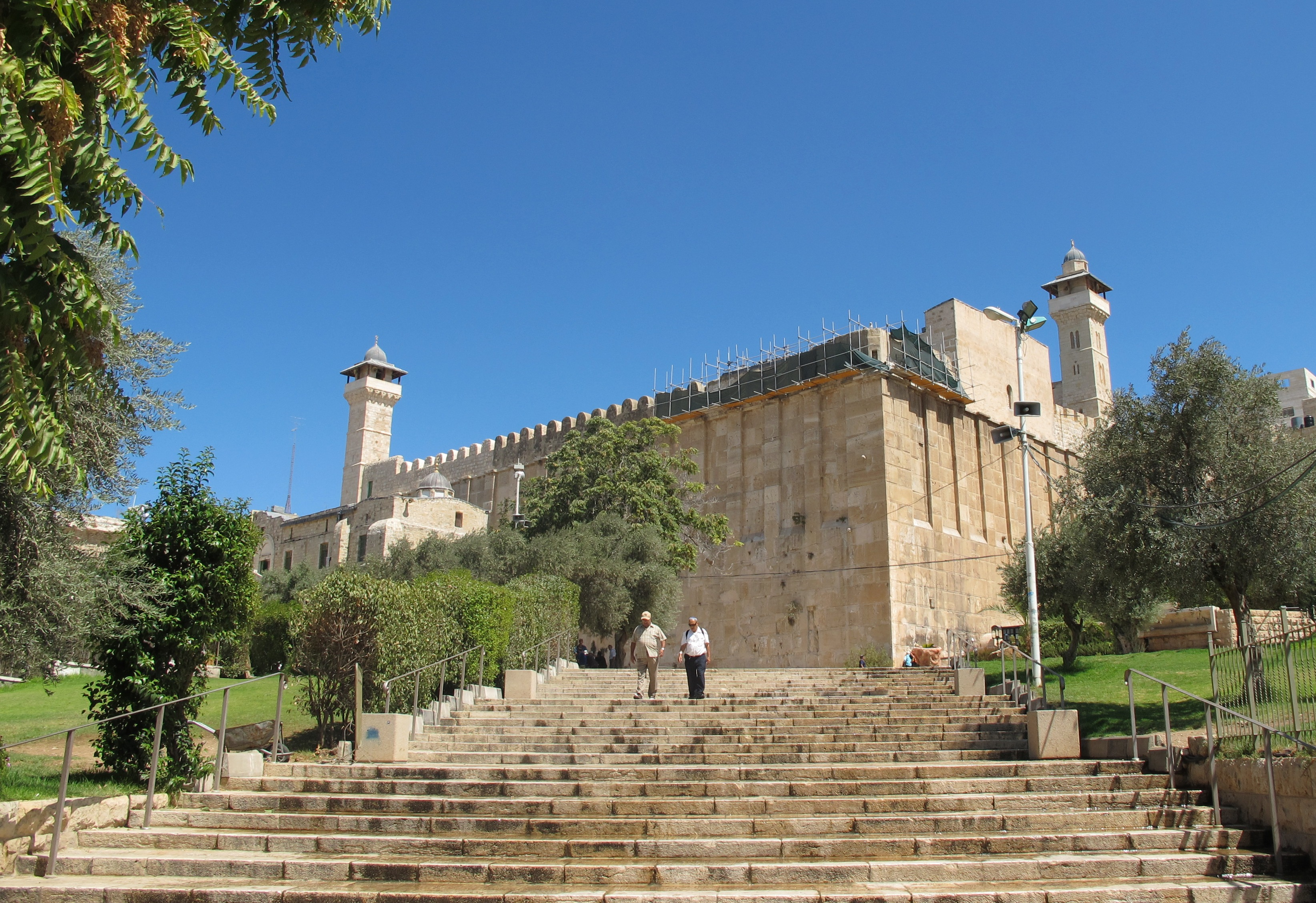
Cave of the Patriarchs in Hebron

While Orthodox and Organized Judaism do not countenance the veneration of saints per se, veneration and pilgrimage to the burial sites of holy Jewish leaders is an ancient part of the tradition. The historian Ephraim Shoham-Steiner has shown that during the medieval period, there is evidence suggesting that some Jews (likely from the margins of society) visited the tombs of Christian saints in search of healing and relief from illness. Naturally, halakhic authorities opposed this practice, but their objections do not negate the fact that the phenomenon existed.

Hasidic and Kabbalah-based Sephardic Jews have a strong tradition of veneration of saints, known in Hebrew as Tzaddikim. Much of Hasidic literature is replete with theology about saints. Veneration of Tzaddikim in Hasidic traditions are similar to in other religions, including lighting candles in their memory, making pilgrimages to their graves, eating meals in their memory, veneration of relics such as clothing or books used by the saint, and observing the yartzeit in a manner similar to saints days, which may include changes in the daily liturgy such as omitting tachanun liturgy on the yartzeit day, noting it as a quasi holiday.

It is common for some Jews to visit the graves of many righteous Jewish leaders. The tradition is particularly strong among Moroccan Jews and Jews of Sephardi descent, although also among some Ashkenazi Jews as well. This is particularly true in Israel, where many holy Jewish leaders are buried. The Cave of the Patriarchs in Hebron, Rachel's Tomb in Bethlehem, Rabbi Shimon Bar Yochai in Mount Meron, the Baba Sali in Netivot, and that of Maimonides in Tiberius are examples of burial sites that attract large pilgrimages in the Near East.

Many Hasidic sites in Ukraine, Poland, and Hungary draw large amounts of pilgrims, particularly in Uman, Ukraine; Lizhensk, Poland; and Kerestir, Hungary.

In America, there are many examples, such as the grave of Rabbi Joel Teitelbaum in Kiryas Joel, Rabbi Shlomo Halberstam in Deans, New Jersey, Rabbi Chaim Zanvil Abramowitz in Monsey, NY, and Rabbi Menachem Mendel Schneerson, at the Ohel, in the cemetery in Queens where he is buried alongside his father-in-law. During his lifetime, Schneerson himself would frequently visit the gravesite (Ohel) of his father-in-law, where he would light candles and read letters and written prayers, and then place them on the grave, as is the custom of all Hasidic pilgrims venerating their saints. Today, visitors to the grave of Schneerson include Jews of Orthodox, Reform and Conservative background, as well as non-Jews. Pilgrims typically light candles and recite prayers of psalms and bring with them petitions of prayers written on pieces of paper which are then torn and left on the grave.

== Jainism ==
In Jainism, it recognizes the tirthankaras, who are beings who have achieved transcendence and liberation (moksha) and are, therefore, teachers who taught the Jain path. Away from the evolution of the cosmos and the cosmic event, they do not intervene in any way in it; they serve only as examples to follow. The latter is manifested in the offering ceremonies (devapuja), which constitute more of a renunciation on the part of the believer than a surrender, since the tirthankaras are totally indifferent to the affairs of men and the Jains assume that they are indifferent to them.

== See also ==
- Veneration of the dead
- Intercession of saints
