= Egeria (pilgrim) =

4th century Roman writer

Egeria, Etheria, or Aetheria was a Hispano-Roman Christian woman, widely regarded to be the author of a detailed account of a pilgrimage to the Holy Land about 381/2–384. The long letter, dubbed Peregrinatio or Itinerarium Egeriae, is addressed to a circle of women at home. The historical details it contains set the journey in the early 380s, making it the earliest of its kind. It survives in fragmentary form in a later copy—lacking a title, date and attribution.

== Discovery and identity ==
The middle part of Egeria's writing survived and was copied in the Codex Aretinus, which was written at Monte Cassino in the 11th century, while the beginning and end are lost. This Codex Aretinus was discovered in 1884 by the Italian scholar Gian Francesco Gamurrini, in a monastic library in Arezzo. In 2005, Jesús Alturo identified two new fragments from one manuscript circa 900 in Carolingian minuscule.

Gamurrini published the Latin text and theorised the author was Sylvia of Aquitaine. In 1903, Marius Férotin claimed the author is one Aetheria or Egeria, known from a letter written by the seventh century Galician monk Valerio of Bierzo. He dated her pilgrimage to about 381–384, during the reign of Theodosius I. Férotin believed she was from Gallaecia, but in 1909 Karl Meister disputed Férotin's theory about the date of Egeria's pilgrimage and her identity. Meister argues that her language shows no evidence of Iberian Romance but rather suggests that she may have been from one of the well-known religious houses of sixth century Gallia Narbonensis; according to this theory, her pilgrimage took place in the first half of the reign of Justinian I (r. 527–565). John Bernard noted certain details of Egeria's account that support the earlier dating: two churches mentioned in the Breviarium and Peregrinatio Theodosii (both circa 530) are absent from Egeria's otherwise detailed description of Jerusalem. Most scholars favor the 4th century date.

The names Aetheria or Egeria are first seen in Valerio's letter, whence also much of the biographical information derives. He praises Egeria and identifies her as a nun, perhaps because she addresses her account to her "sorores" (Latin for "sisters") at home. However, others (including Hagith Sivan, 1988) have pointed out that during Egeria's time it was common to address fellow lay Christians as "sisters" and "brothers". It is possible that Egeria used the term to address her Christian acquaintances. Valerio may also have believed her to be a nun because she went on such a pilgrimage, although lay women of the time are known to have engaged in such religious tourism. Egeria's ability to make a long and expensive journey by herself, her numerous acquaintances and attentive guides in the places she visited, and her education indicate her middle or upper class wealthy background. In his letter to Egeria, Valerio mentioned the shores of the "Western sea" or "Ocean" from which Egeria was sprung, which suggests he was writing about a person travelling from the Roman Gallaecia, but Meister believes that her reference to the river Rhone supports his theory of Gaulish origin.

== Travels of Egeria ==
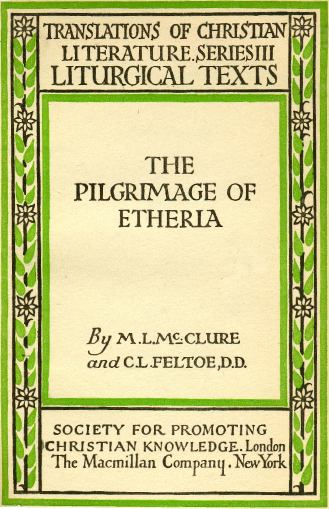
Cover of a translation into English of The Journey of Egeria type published in 1919

Egeria set down her observations in a letter now called Itinerarium Egeriae ("Travels of Egeria"). It is sometimes also called Peregrinatio Aetheriae ("Pilgrimage of Aetheria") or Peregrinatio ad Loca Sancta ("Pilgrimage to the Holy Lands") or some other combination. It is the earliest extant graphic account of a Christian pilgrimage. The text has numerous lacunae.

The text is a narrative apparently written at the end of Egeria's journey from notes she took en route, and addressed to her 'dear ladies': the women of her spiritual community back home. In the first extant part of the text, she describes the journey from her approach to Mount Sinai until her stop in Constantinople. Staying for three years in Jerusalem, she made excursions to Mount Nebo and to the tomb of Job in ancient Carneas or Karnaia (modern Al-Shaykh Saad, Syria). She wrote extensively on her observations of Holy Week proceedings and an Easter vigil, both at Jerusalem in immediate succession of each other.

Additionally, she visited the burial places of Haran, the brother of Abraham, as well as the site where Eliezer met with Rebecca. She spent time at the Sea of Galilee and comments on the traditions, which include that of Christ feeding the multitude and the place where he performed his miracles. On her way back to Europe she stopped at Hagia Thekla—i. e. the shrine of Saint Thecla's near Seleucia Isauriae (modern Silifke, Turkey), particularly venerated by women. Upon her return to Constantinople, she planned to make a further trip to St. John's at Ephesus.

The second portion of the text is a detailed account of the liturgical services and observances of the church calendar in Jerusalem (most likely, under Cyril), The liturgical year was in its incipient stages at the time of her visit. This is invaluable because the development of liturgical worship (e. g. Lent, Palm or Passion Sunday) reached universal practice in the 4th century. Egeria provides a first-hand account of practices and implementation of liturgical seasons as they existed at the time of her visit. This snapshot is before universal acceptance of a December 25 celebration of the nativity of Jesus; this is very early and very helpful in cataloguing the development of annual liturgical worship.

Philologists have studied Egeria's letter, which contains a wealth of information about the evolution of Latin in late antiquity into the "Proto-Romance" language, from which the medieval and modern family of Romance languages later emerged. For example, expressions such as "deductores sancti illi" (meaning "those holy guides" in classical Latin, but here rather simply "the holy guides") reveal the origins of the definite article now used in the Romance languages (except for Sardinian and certain dialects of Catalan)—cf. Spanish ("las santas guías") or Italian ("le sante guide"). Similarly, the use of ipsam in a phrase such as "per mediam vallem ipsam" (classical Latin "through [the] middle of [the] valley itself") anticipates the definite article ("péri su mesu de sa bàdde") found in Sardinian and in some dialects of Catalan, namely Balearic Catalan, along the Costa Brava (Catalonia), and in the Valencian municipalities of Tàrbena and La Vall de Gallinera.

== See also ==
Chronological list of early Christian geographers and pilgrims to the Holy Land who wrote about their travels, and other related works

=== Late Roman and Byzantine period ===
- Eusebius of Caesarea (260/65–339/40), Church historian and geographer of the Holy Land
- Anonymous "Pilgrim of Bordeaux", pilgrim to the Holy Land (333–4) who left travel descriptions
- St Jerome (Hieronymus; fl. 386–420), translator of the Bible, brought an important contribution to the topography of the Holy Land
- Madaba Map, mosaic map of the Holy Land from the second half of the 6th century
- Anonymous pilgrim of Piacenza, pilgrim to the Holy Land (570s) who left travel descriptions

=== Early Post-classical period ===
- Paschal Chronicle, 7th-century Greek Christian chronicle of the world
- Arculf, pilgrim to the Holy Land (c. 680) who left a detailed narrative of his travels

=== Medieval period ===
- John of Würzburg, pilgrim to the Holy Land (1160s) who left travel descriptions
