= Thecla =

Early Christian saint

Saint Thecla
- Thecla in flames, attended by angels, a scene from the Acts of Paul and Thecla carved on the predella of the reredos of the main altar in Tarragona Cathedral

Virgin martyr Equal-to-apostles
- Born: c. AD 30; Iconium (now Konya, Turkey)
- Died: AD 1st century
- Venerated in: Eastern Orthodox Church; Catholic Church; Oriental Orthodox Church; Anglican Church
- Feast: September 23 (Catholic Roman Rite, Episcopal); September 24 (Eastern Orthodox); Thout 23 (Coptic); Tuesday after fourth Sunday of the Exaltation of the Cross (Armenian)

Thecla (Ancient Greek: Θέκλα, Thékla) was a saint of the early Christian Church, and a reported follower of Paul the Apostle. The earliest record of her life comes from the ancient apocryphal Acts of Paul and Thecla.

== Church tradition ==
The Acts of Paul and Thecla is a 2nd-century text (c. AD 180) which forms part of the Acts of Paul, but was also circulated separately. According to the text, Thecla was a young noble virgin from Iconium who chose to leave her fiancé so she could convert to Christianity and follow Paul.

In the text, it is said that Thecla spent three days sitting by her window, listening to Paul speak about God and the importance of living in chastity. Thecla's mother, Theoclia, and fiancé, Thamyris, became concerned that Thecla was going to follow Paul's teachings. They turned to local authorities to punish Paul for being a Christian and "mak[ing] virgins averse to marriage". Paul was sent to prison, where Thecla visited him, kissed his bonds, and refused to leave him and return to her mother and fiancé. Paul was made to leave the city and Thecla was condemned to be burned.

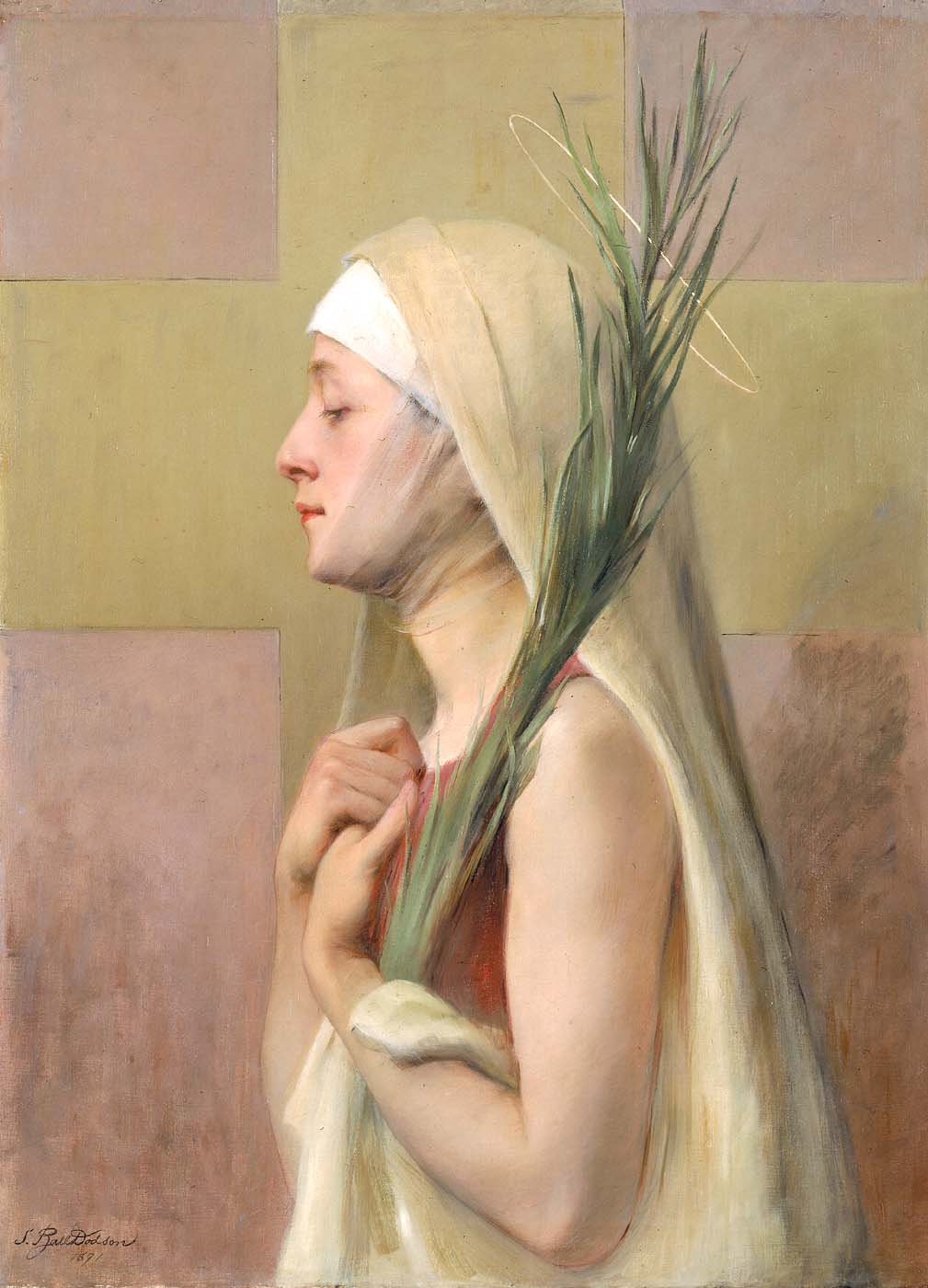
Une Martyre (Saint Thechla) (1891) by Sarah Paxton Ball Dodson

However, Thecla was miraculously saved from burning at the stake by the onset of a storm. She then encountered Paul outside of Iconium, where she told him, "I will cut my hair off and I shall follow you wherever you go". She then traveled with Paul to Antioch of Pisidia. There, a nobleman named Alexander desired Thecla and attempted to rape her. Thecla fought him off, tore his cloak, and knocked his coronet off his head, which caused her to be put on trial for assault. She was sentenced to be eaten by wild beasts, but was again saved by a series of miracles. In one scene, female beasts, particularly lionesses, protected her against her male aggressors. While in the arena, she baptized herself by throwing herself into a nearby lake full of aggressive seals, who were all killed by lightning before they could devour her. Thecla is then released by the governor.

Thecla rejoined Paul in Myra, "wearing a mantle that she had altered so as to make a man's cloak". With Paul's blessing she returns to Iconium. As she traveled, she preached the word of God and encouraged women to imitate her by living a life of chastity. According to some versions of the Acts, Thecla lived in a cave in Seleucia Cilicia for 72 years, where she continued to spread Christianity.

It is also said that Thecla spent the rest of her life in Maaloula, a village in Syria. There, she became a healer and performed many miracles, but remained constantly persecuted. In one instance, as her persecutors were about to get to her, she called out to God, a new passage was opened in the cave she was in, and the stones closed behind her. Before her death, she was able to go to Rome and lie down beside Paul's tomb.

== Traditions and interpretations ==
Tertullian, in chapter 17 of his work On Baptism, writes:

But if the writings which wrongly go under Paul's name, claim Thecla's example as a license for women's teaching and baptizing, let them know that, in Asia, the presbyter who composed that writing, as if he were augmenting Paul's fame from his own store, after being convicted, and confessing that he had done it from love of Paul, was removed from his office.

Johann Peter Kirsch says, "Notwithstanding the purely legendary character of the entire story, it is not impossible that it is connected with an historical person."

The Church Fathers recount a number of traditions about Thecla. Gregory of Nyssa writes in the 4th century (Homily 14 in Cant) that she undertook the sacrifice of herself, by giving death to the flesh, practicing great austerities, extinguishing in herself all earthly affections, so that nothing seemed to remain living in her but reason and spirit: the whole world seemed dead to her as she was to the world. Macarius Magnes, shortly after AD 300, wrote how the message of Christianity was "the sword, [Matt 10:34] which cuts relations from each other [Matt:10:35], as it cut Thecla from Theocleia". Around AD 280, Thecla features as one of the characters in Methodius of Olympus' Symposium, in which she displays considerable knowledge of secular philosophy, various branches of literature, and eloquent yet modest discourse. Methodius states that she received her instruction in divine and evangelical knowledge from Paul, and was eminent for her skill in sacred science ("Logos 8").

The martyrdom of Thecla is frequently referred to in the earliest Acts of the Martyrs. Eugenius, a martyr of Trebizond under Diocletian (284–305), couples Thecla with David and Daniel in his prayers. The exordium of the Acts of Polyeuctes (died 259) refers to Thecla and Perpetua, and there were certainly many virgin martyrs who drew their first inspiration from the same source. Eugenia of Rome in the reign of Commodus (180–192) is reported in the Acts of her martyrdom to have taken Thecla as her model.

According to some scholars, Thecla's story inspired many later stories of women saints who dressed as men, including St. Anastasia the Patrician, St. Matrona of Perge, St. Euphrosyne of Alexandria, St. Apolinaria, St. Eugenia of Rome, St. Marina the Monk, and St. Theodora of Alexandria. Written three or four centuries after the Acts of Paul and Thecla, these stories reference Thecla's story through thematic connections, and in the case of The Life of Eugenia, explicitly.

Thekla, not yet identified as a saint, also features in a Coptic manuscript, "The Passion of St. Paese and Thekla".

== Veneration ==
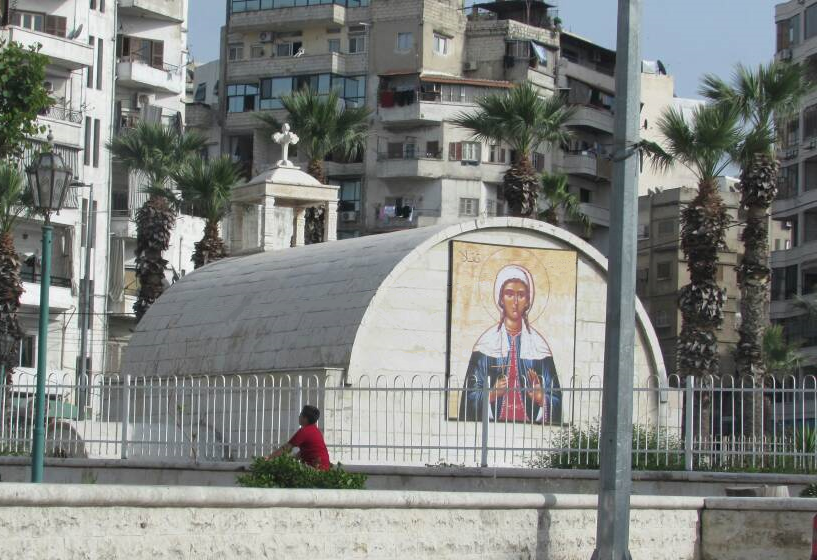
St. Thecla Shrine. Latakia, Syria

In the Eastern Orthodox Church, the wide circulation of the Acts of Paul and Thecla is evidence of her veneration. She was called "apostle and protomartyr among women" and "equal-to-apostles in sanctity". She was widely cited as an ascetic role model for women. During the fourth and fifth centuries, Thecla was lauded in literature as an exemplary virgin and martyr by ascetic writers and theologians such as Methodius of Olympus, Gregory of Nyssa, and Gregory of Nazianzus. The Eastern Rites of the Eastern Orthodox Church commemorate her on 24 September in churches following the new Calendar and 7 October for those using the old Calendar.

Her veneration flourished particularly at Seleucia Cilicia (where she was said to have lived to old age and be buried), Iconium (present day Konya), and Nicomedia. Chamalières in France was believed to hold relics. The obscure saints, Tecla of Aquileia and of Trieste are modeled after her. In Bede's martyrology, Thecla is celebrated on 23 September, which was her feast day in the West, though in 1969 the Roman Catholic Church removed Thecla's feast day from the Calendar of Saints for lack of historic evidence. The Western Rite Parishes of the Orthodox Churches continue to celebrate her on 23 September (new Calendar Parishes) and 6 October (old Calendar Churches). The Western Rite Monastic Order of Saint Paul the First Hermit celebrates her feast day on 24 September.

A local martyr tradition of Thecla may have inspired an episode connected to Paul the Apostle. "It is otherwise difficult to account for the very great popularity of the cult of St. Thecla, which spread over East and West, and made her the most famous of virgin martyrs," wrote M. R. James, the editor of this Acta (James 1924).

=== Tomb of Saint Thecla, Silifke ===
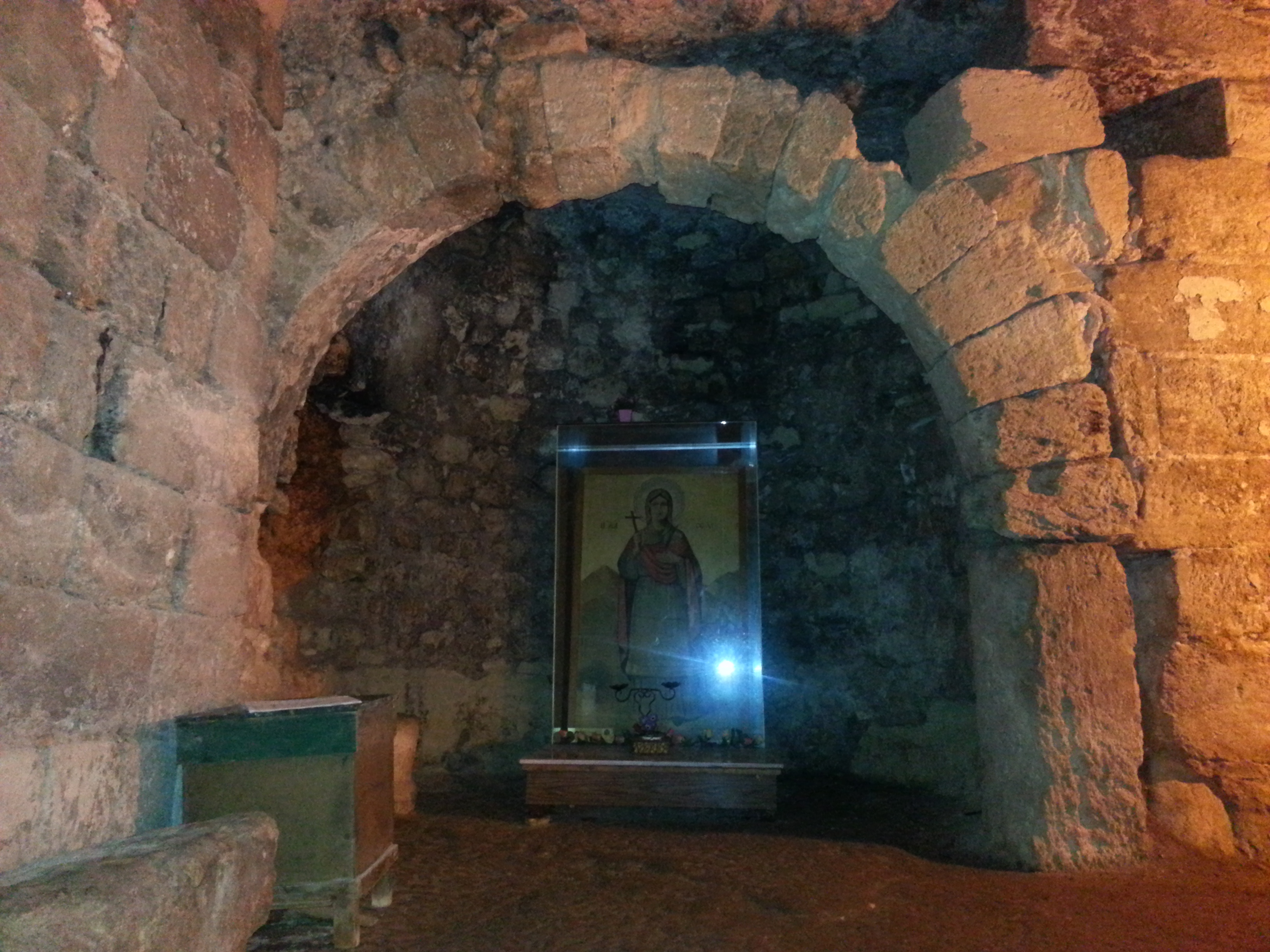
Aya Tekla in Seleucia

The cave-tomb in Seleucia was one of the most celebrated in the Christian world. Gregory of Nazianzus withdrew to the shrine of "the highly praised young maid Thecla" for three years. The site was described by Egeria in the mid-380s. It was restored several times, among others by the Emperor Zeno in the 5th century, and today the ruins of the tomb and sanctuary are called Aya Tekla Church or Meriamlik. A 5th-century anonymous work, The Life and Miracles of Thecla, concentrates on the town.

=== Tomb of Saint Thecla, Maaloula ===
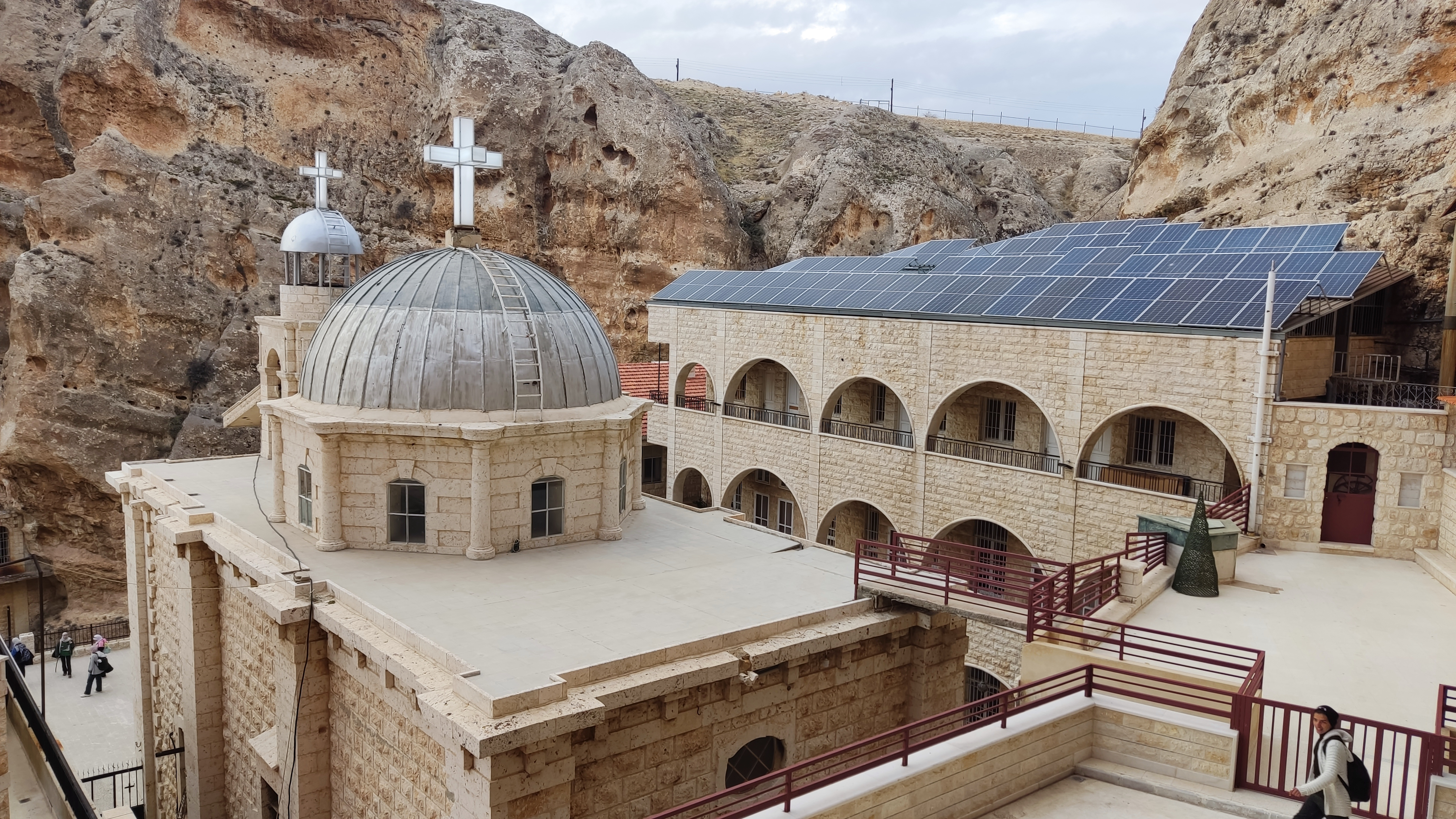
The Convent of St. Thecla (Maaloula)

In Maaloula, Syria, a Greek Orthodox convent, the Convent of Saint Thecla, was built near her cave tomb, reached by steps in the mountainside, a pilgrimage site with a holy well. The Church tradition is that the mountain opened miraculously to protect Thecla from her persecutors.

On Monday, December 2, 2013, during the Syrian civil war, twelve nuns there were seized by Al-Qaeda radicals of Al-Nusra Front during the bombardment of her shrine; three months later the nuns were exchanged for relatives of terrorists and in April 2014, the town was liberated by Syrian governmental troops. On May 30, 2018, the rector of the Church, Ilias Ades, announced that the monastery would be entirely restored in a month by the Greek Orthodox Church of Antioch with help from the Russian Orthodox Church. The Monastery is a popular destination for Eastern Orthodox Christians from around the world, including Russia.

=== Monastery of Saint Tecla, Larnaca ===
According to tradition, the Roman empress Helena founded the monastery of Saint Tecla that is located in Mosfiloti near Larnaca. After the Mamluks had taken control of Armenian Kingdom of Cilicia, part of the hallows of Saint Thecla were carried to Cyprus by Christians. The hallows are in this monastery now.

=== St. Menas in Cyprus ===
An inscription in remembrance "of the martyr Thecla" in the church of St. Menas in Cyprus, and dated to the second half of the 1st century, was interpreted in the early twentieth century as evidence for her historical existence. At this pilgrimage site near the Church of St. Menas in Cyprus, women had the option to buy a flask which they could fill with holy water, oil, or even dirt from that stop which many women visited during their pilgrimage. These flasks depict the image of Menas on one side and Thecla on the other side.

=== Catacomb of Saint Thecla, Rome ===
The Catacomb of Saint Thecla is a Christian catacomb in the city of Rome, near the Via Ostiense and the Basilica of Saint Paul Outside the Walls, in the southern quarter of the ancient city. The catacomb was constructed in the fourth century of the Common Era, being a re-use of a first-century pagan necropolis. The catacomb seems to have fallen into disuse in the 9th century. It was rediscovered in 1870 by archaeologist Mariano Armellini, in accordance with the pilgrimage itineraries, and was thus excavated.

In June 2010, on a wall of the Catacomba di Santa Tecla in Rome, Vatican archaeologists of the Pontifical Commission for Sacred Archaeology, using laser technology to remove layers of clay and lime rind, discovered a frescoed portrait of St Paul the Apostle, "recognizable by his thin face and dark pointed beard... with small eyes and furrowed brow", which they believe is the oldest image in existence of Paul, dating from the late 4th century. Additional portraits appeared to be Saint Peter, John the Apostle, and Andrew. These are rendered as the earliest portraits of the apostles.

=== The Movement of St. Thecla ===
St. Thecla, with her dedication and image of a chosen saint, started a following of masses of women across Asia Minor and Egypt. St. Thecla was praised among these women as a sort of patron of empowerment for women: in the Acts of Paul and Thecla, St. Thecla preached to men, and baptized herself, all things that were normally supposed to have only been done by men.

St. Thecla created a culture of imitation in these women. Several of them would live as virgins in households, in tombs (as she was rumored to do), and sometimes in monasteries. These women would travel together as bands of empowered virgins telling stories of Thecla and her grace. Other women in the Movement of St. Thecla would name their daughters after her and engrave her face on their tombs and on their oil lamps. All of these women were empowered by Thecla, a woman who did things that not many women would ever dare to do, and they built a strong community in which they empowered each other.

== Patronage ==
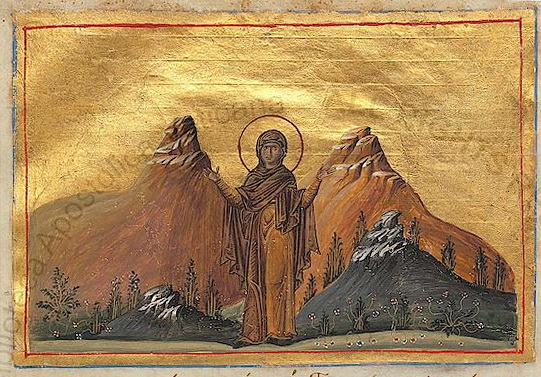
Icon of Saint Thecla from the 11th century Menologion of Basil II

Thecla is counted as the patron saint of Tarragona and Sitges in Catalonia (Spain), where the cathedral has a chapel dedicated to her. Her feast day remains the town's major local holiday. In Galicia Spain the hill of Santa Tecla that overlooks A Guarda is named after her. In Spanish-speaking countries, she is also facetiously counted as the patron saint of computers and Internet, from the homophony with the Spanish and Catalan word tecla ("key"). The earliest cathedral in Milan was also dedicated to her; its baptistry and remnants of its structure are still accessible below the present structure. The duomo of the town of Este, Veneto, is dedicated to Santa Tecla. Lebanon has 42 churches dedicated to St. Takla or Taqla. One of the oldest is the St. Taqla Church in Masqa, Matn District, built in 1695. The church boasts an 1870 painting of Thecla by the Italian artist Vincento Lampodico.

In Syria, there is a Greek Orthodox church of St. Thecla in Darayya. In 1849, some people found a cave in Latakia which later became St. Taqla's Shrine.

In Wales in the UK, there is a church dedicated to Saint Tecla in the village of Llandegla, with an icon of the saint near the altar.

In the United States there are three Roman Catholic parishes named for Saint Thecla: in Clinton, Michigan; in Pembroke, Massachusetts; and in Chicago, Illinois.

Several cities and towns are named for her:

- Santa Tecla, formerly Nuevo San Salvador, in La Libertad, El Salvador
- Sainte-Thècle, Quebec, Canada
- The hamlet of Sainte-Thècle in the commune of Peillon, Alpes-Maritimes, France
- Santa Tecla, a quarter (frazione) of Acireale, Italy
- Santa Tecla de Basto, a quarter (freguesia) of Celorico de Basto, Portugal
- The neighbourhood of Leipzig Thekla in Leipzig, Germany
- Deir Taqla (Monastery of Thecla), South Lebanon

== See also ==
- Aya Tekla Church, an ancient church in Mersin Province, Turkey.
- Leucius Charinus
- Santa Tecla, El Salvador
- Santa Tecla Festival
- Sainte-Thècle, Quebec, in Canada
- List of Christian women of the patristic age

== Bibliography ==
- Barrier, J. W.; Bremmer, J. N.; Niklas, T.; Puig i Tàrrech, A. (2016). Thecla: Paul's Disciple and Saint in the East and the West. Bristol, CT: Peeters.
- Elliott, J. K. (1993). The Apocryphal New Testament: A Collection of Apocryphal Christian Literature in an English Translation. Oxford: Oxford University Press.
- Johnson, Scott Fitzgerald (2006). The Life and Miracles of Thekla: A Literary Study. Cambridge, MA: Harvard University Press.
- MacDonald, Dennis R. (1983). The Legend and the Apostle: The Battle for Paul in Story and Canon. Philadelphia: Westminster Press.
- Kirsch, J. P. (1912). "Sts. Thecla". The Catholic Encyclopedia. Vol. 14. New York: Robert Appleton Company.
- Ehrman, Bart D. (2005). Lost Christianities: The Battles for Scripture and the Faiths We Never Knew. Oxford: Oxford University Press. ISBN 978-0-19-518249-1.
- Davis, Stephen J. (2001). The Cult of Saint Thecla. Oxford: Oxford University Press.
- Osiek, Carolyn (2003). "The Cult of Thecla: A Tradition of Women's Piety in Late Antiquity (Review)". Journal of Early Christian Studies. 11 (3): 422–424.
- Davis, S. J. (2023). The cult of Saint Thecla : a tradition of women’s piety in late antiquity. Clarendon.
