= Sarah Paxton Ball Dodson =

American painter (1847–1906)

- Born: February 22, 1847; Philadelphia, Pennsylvania, United States of America
- Died: January 8, 1906 (aged 58); Brighton, England
- Known for: Exhibited artwork at the World's Columbian Exposition
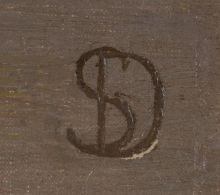
- Signature

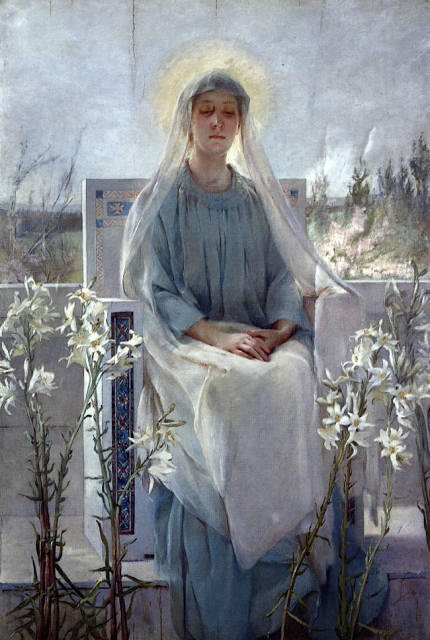
Sarah Paxton Ball Dodson, Meditation of the Holy Virgin, 1889

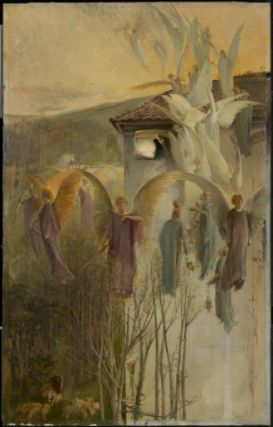
Sarah Paxton Ball Dodson, Le Berceau, 1903, Museum of Fine Arts, Boston

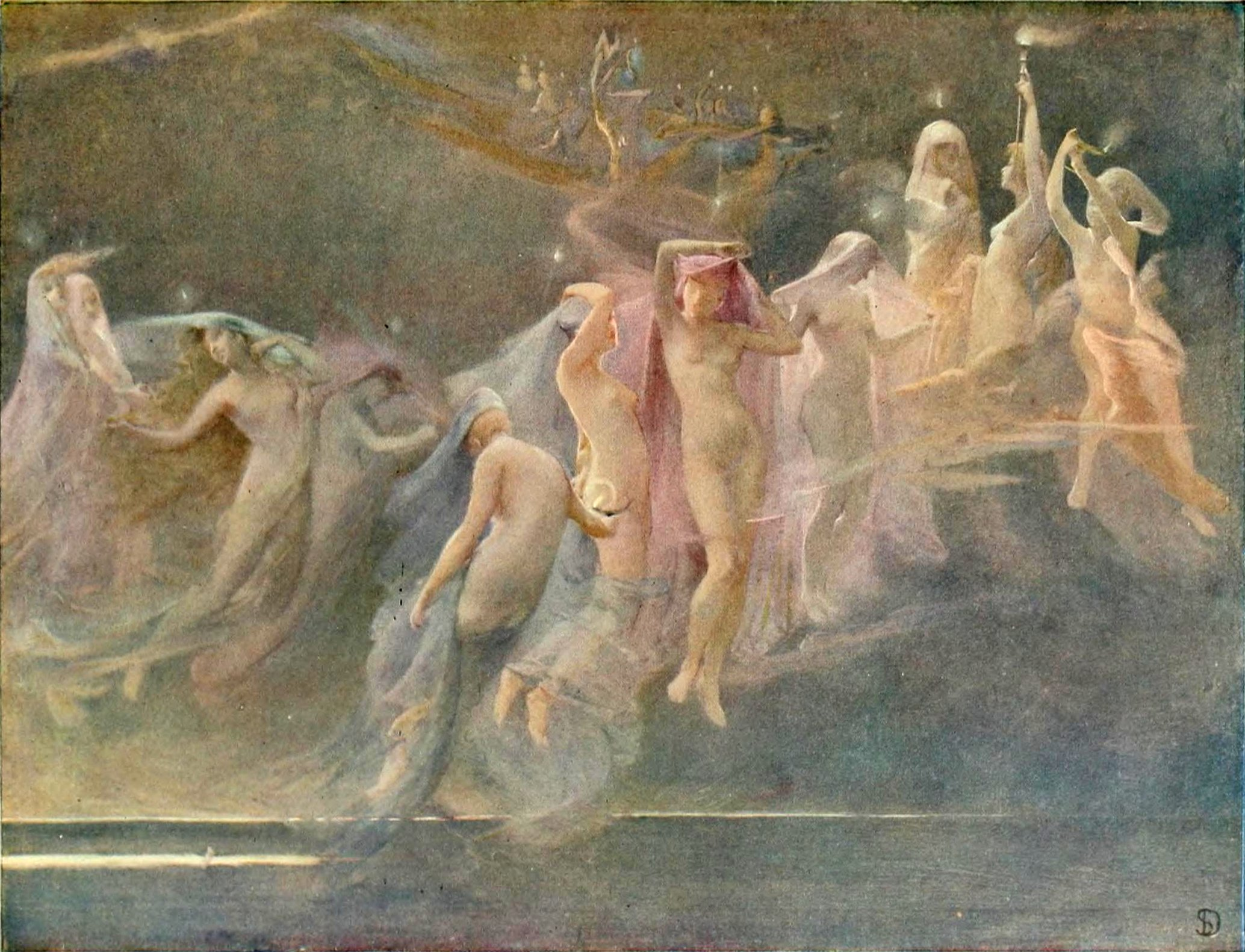
Sarah Ball Dodson, The Morning Stars (Les Etoiles du Matin)

Sarah Paxton Ball Dodson (February 22, 1847 – January 8, 1906) was an American-born artist who was recognized as one of the leading American women artists in Paris during the 1880s, and whose artwork was exhibited at the World's Columbian Exposition in 1893.

Dodson's artistic interests were broad, from the semi-classic French influence of her earlier works, such as La Danse, to the schools of the Italian Renaissance, followed by a period of realistic portraiture, including one of her more famous works, The Signing of the Declaration of Independence, painted in 1883. Her later works blended realism and idealism. Her interests in nature and poetry were reflected in her works.

== Early life and education ==
Sarah Paxton Ball Dodson was born in Philadelphia, Pennsylvania, on February 22, 1847. She was the only daughter of Richard Whatcoat Dodson and Harriott Dodson. Her father was a man of artistic tastes who had done amateur line engraving and miniature painting work before his eyesight began to fail at a young age. Dodson's artistic tendencies developed early, when she began drawing at the age of three. Richard Dodson discouraged his daughter's artistic pursuits, being strongly opposed to the serious pursuit of art by women.

Her formal study of art did not commence until after his death, in 1872, when she enrolled as a private pupil of Christian Schussele at the Pennsylvania Academy of the Fine Arts. She was one of many American women who went to Paris to study art from distinguished artist. She studied under Évariste Vital Luminais for three years beginning in 1873. About 1890 she returned to Paris and studied under Jules Joseph Lefebvre for a brief period, and occasionally received tutelage from Louis-Maurice Boutet de Monvel.

== Artistic career ==
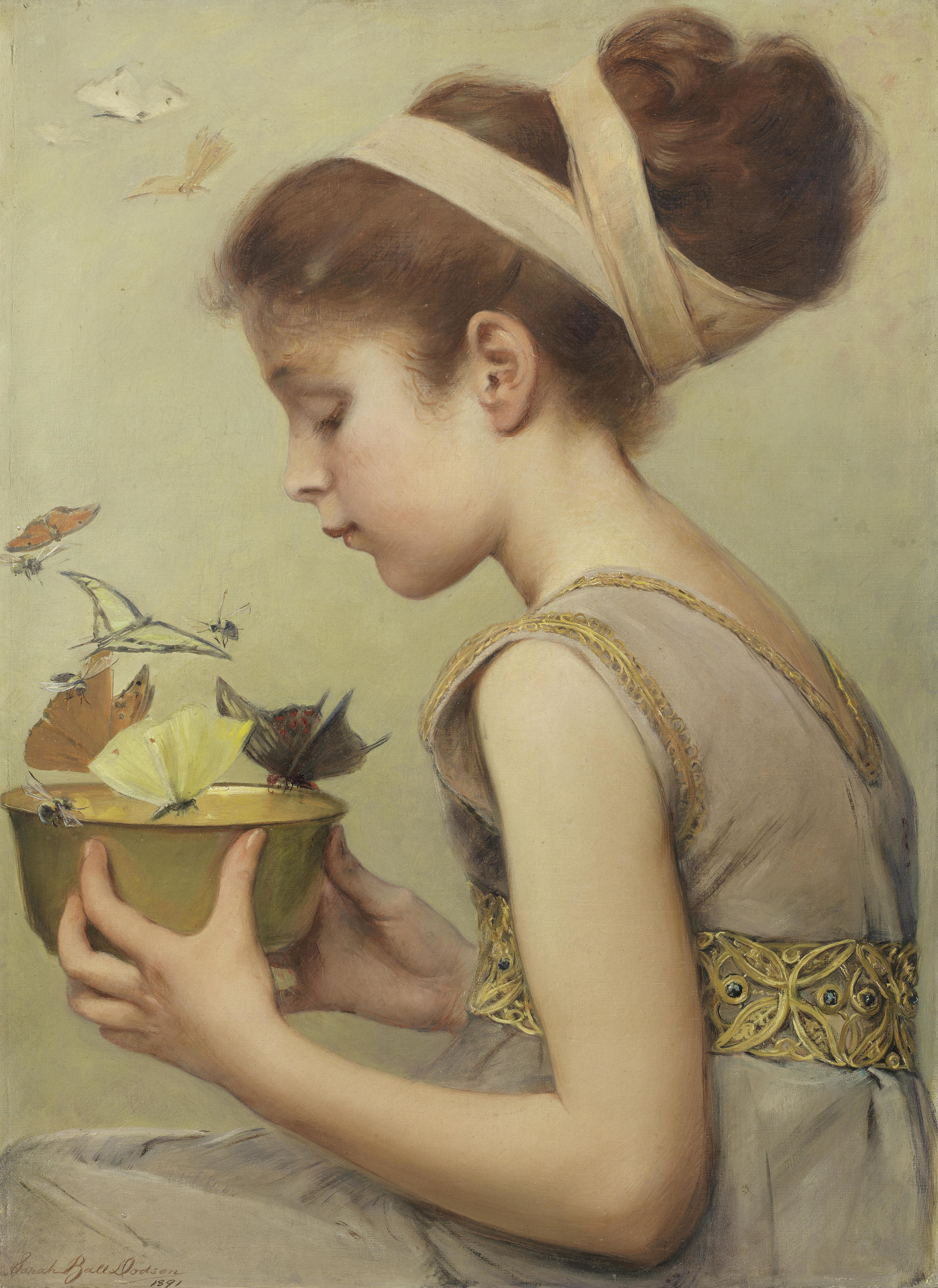
Butterflies, also known as Honey of the Hymettus

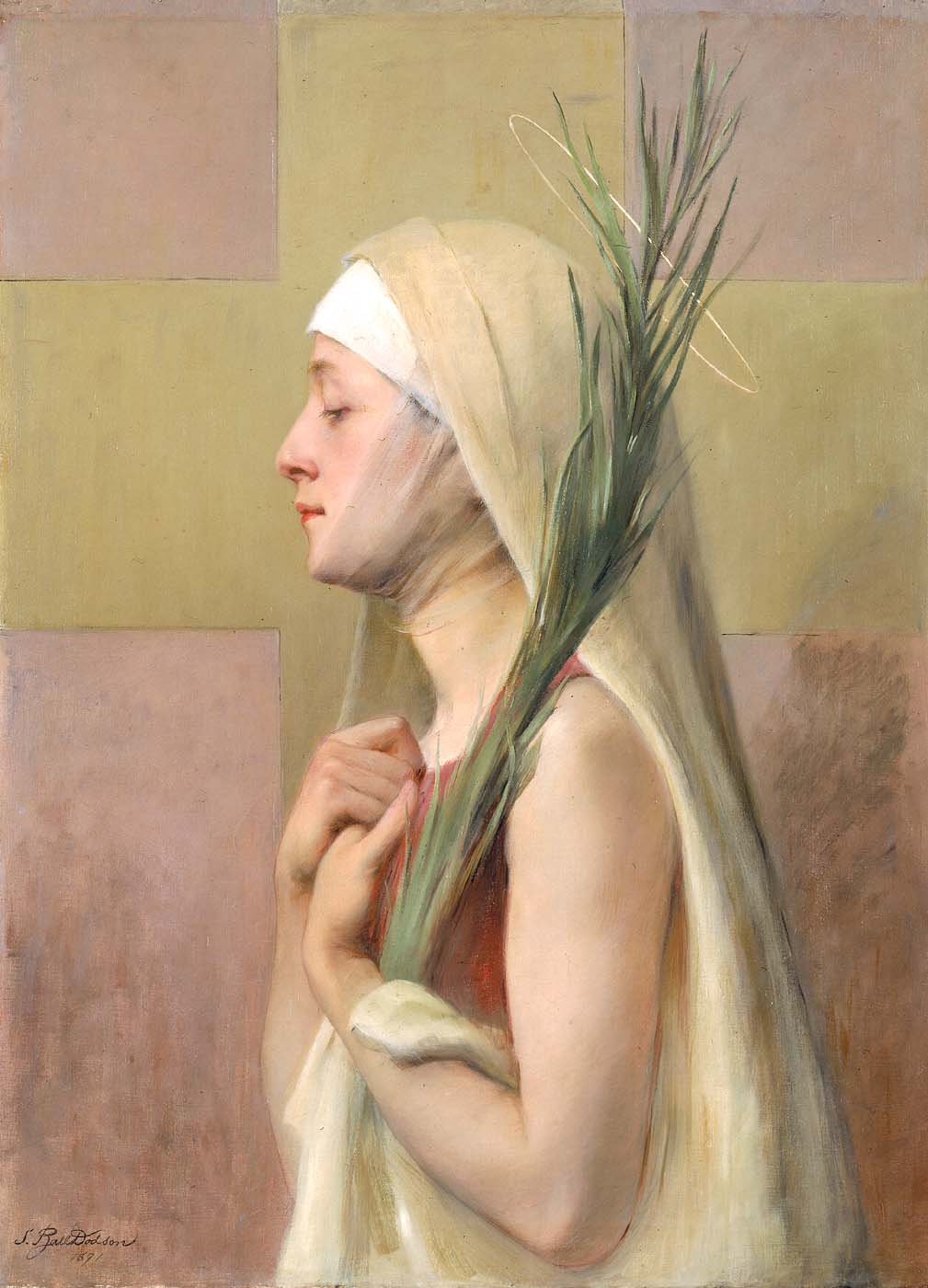
Une Martyre (Saint Thechla), 1923

Dodson was recognized as one of the leading American women artists of the late 19th century. Dodson's artistic interests were broad, starting with the semi-classic French influence of her earlier works, such as La Danse. In 1878 she exhibited La Danse, that she painted in 1876, at the Paris Exposition. Thereafter she exhibited regularly at the Paris Salon. Her painting L'Amour Menetrier, with a French Rococo influence, has been compared to Bacchus and Ariadne, a painting completed by Titian in 1523.

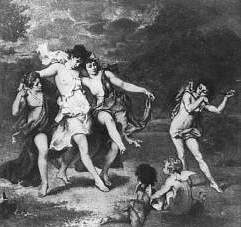
Sarah Paxton Ball Dodson, L'amour Ménétrier (Cupid the Fiddler), 1877 (black and white photograph)

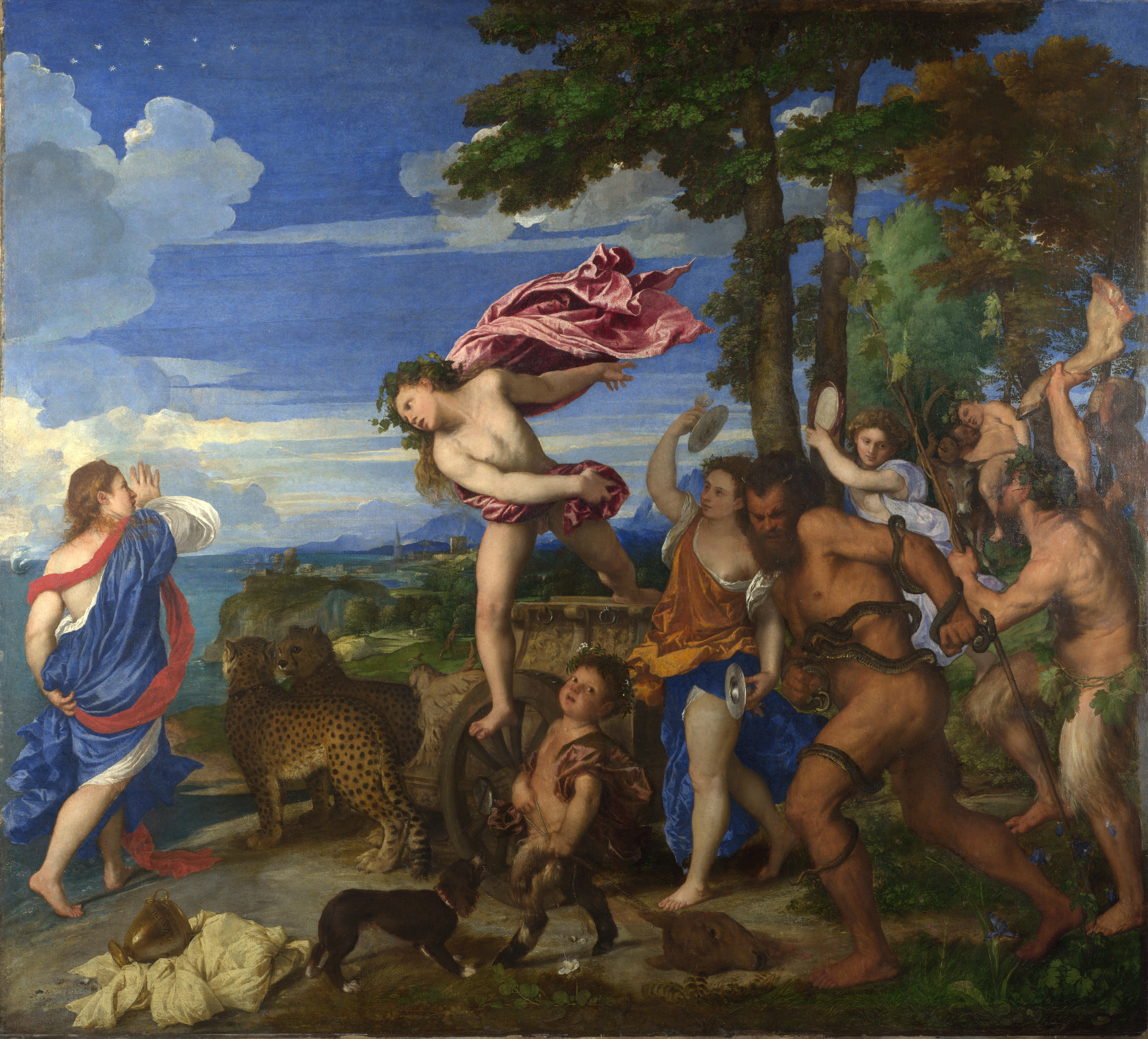
Titian, Bacchus and Ariadne, 1520-1523, National Gallery, London

Her works were influenced by the Italian Renaissance, particularly by Michelangelo. Examples include Deborah (1878), which was shown in Paris at the Exposition Universelle in 1878 and a year later at the Paris Salon, and The Invocation of Moses, which was exhibited in 1882 at the Paris Salon. In New York it was shown at the National Academy of Design's annual exhibition in 1883. Dodson's 1883 Salon entry The Bacidae was described by an art critic as "the most important work by an American woman this year" in the August 1883 edition of The Art Amateur.

This was followed by one of her more famous works, The Signing of the Declaration of Independence, painted c. 1883.

In 1885 she returned to the United States and began creating plein-air landscape paintings. For The Morning Stars that she made in 1886 she adopted a "poetic style" that reflects influences of English Pre-Raphaelites and French symbolism.

She also exhibited at the Pennsylvania Academy of the Fine Arts in 1883 and 1905, the National Academy of Design during the 1880s and 1890s, the Society of American Artists in 1878, the 1889 Paris Exposition, and others.

Dodson exhibited her work at the Palace of Fine Arts and the Woman's Building at the 1893 World's Columbian Exposition in Chicago, Illinois. She also painted a mural for the reception room of the Pennsylvania State Building at the Exposition.

== Later life and death ==
She was living in France in 1891 when she decided to move to Brighton, England, where her brother R. Ball Dodson lived. Dodson's work was frequently interrupted by poor health. A very serious illness that affected her from 1893–1894 nearly ended her career: she was never again able to stand while painting and was forced to take frequent breaks from her work, which was consequently limited to sketches and smaller paintings.

She died in Brighton on January 8, 1906. She was working on the unfinished The Annunciation on the day of her death in 1906.

Many of her works were exhibited posthumously during September and October 1910 at the Corporation Art Gallery in Brighton, England, her last place of residence. Her paintings were also among a notable group of acquisitions exhibited at the Corcoran Gallery in Washington, DC in 1911.

== Collections ==
Her works are among the collections of:

- Brooklyn Museum of Art, New York
- Indianapolis Museum of Art, Indiana
- Museum of Fine Arts, Boston, Massachusetts
- Philadelphia Museum of Art, Pennsylvania
