= Santa Tecla Festival =

Folkloric party in Tarragona, Spain

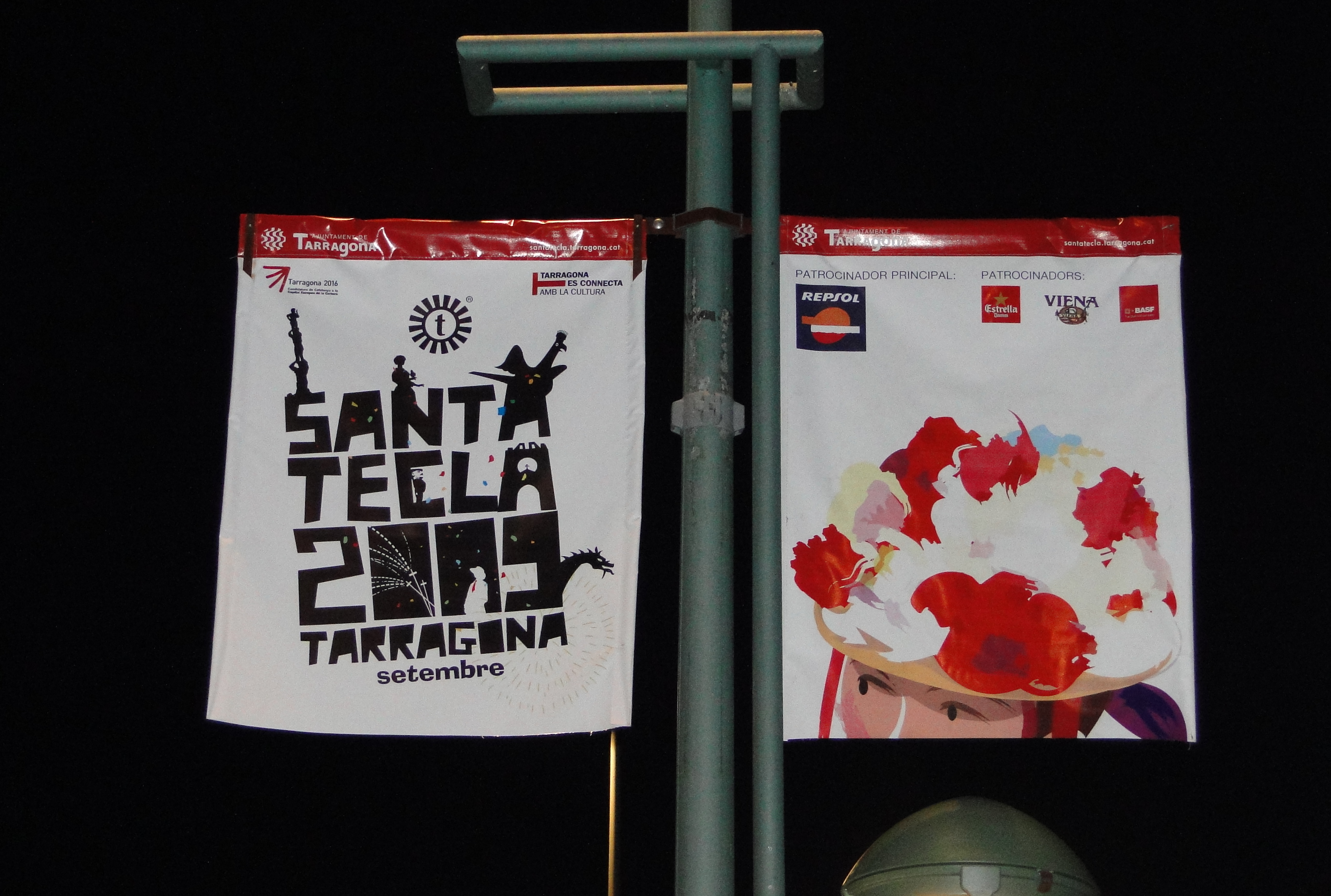
Santa Tecla Festival 2009

The Santa Tecla Festival (Catalan: Festes de Santa Tecla, IPA: [ˈfestəz ðə ˈsantə ˈteklə]) is a festival held in Tarragona, Catalonia, Spain.

Plunging into the festivities of Santa Tecla of Tarragona unavoidably involves becoming impregnated with fragrances that link the present times with history, with heritage legacy. This is precisely the route, maintained through the centuries, that defines the personality of the festivities are rock music, jazz, drama plays, music-hall, movies, parties, sport activities and so on. However, the essence of it still is the collection of dances, the bestiary, the entremesos (interlude or short farce), the "spoken dances" and the "human castles", all of which shape the "Popular Retinue" of the city, as a genuine corpus, particular of the celebration.

It has been named as a Traditional Festival of national interest (Festa tradicional d'interès nacional, in catalan language), by the Government of Catalonia, and also as a Touristic Festival of national interest by the Spanish Government. It is one of the two unique festivals in Catalonia has both declarations.

== History ==
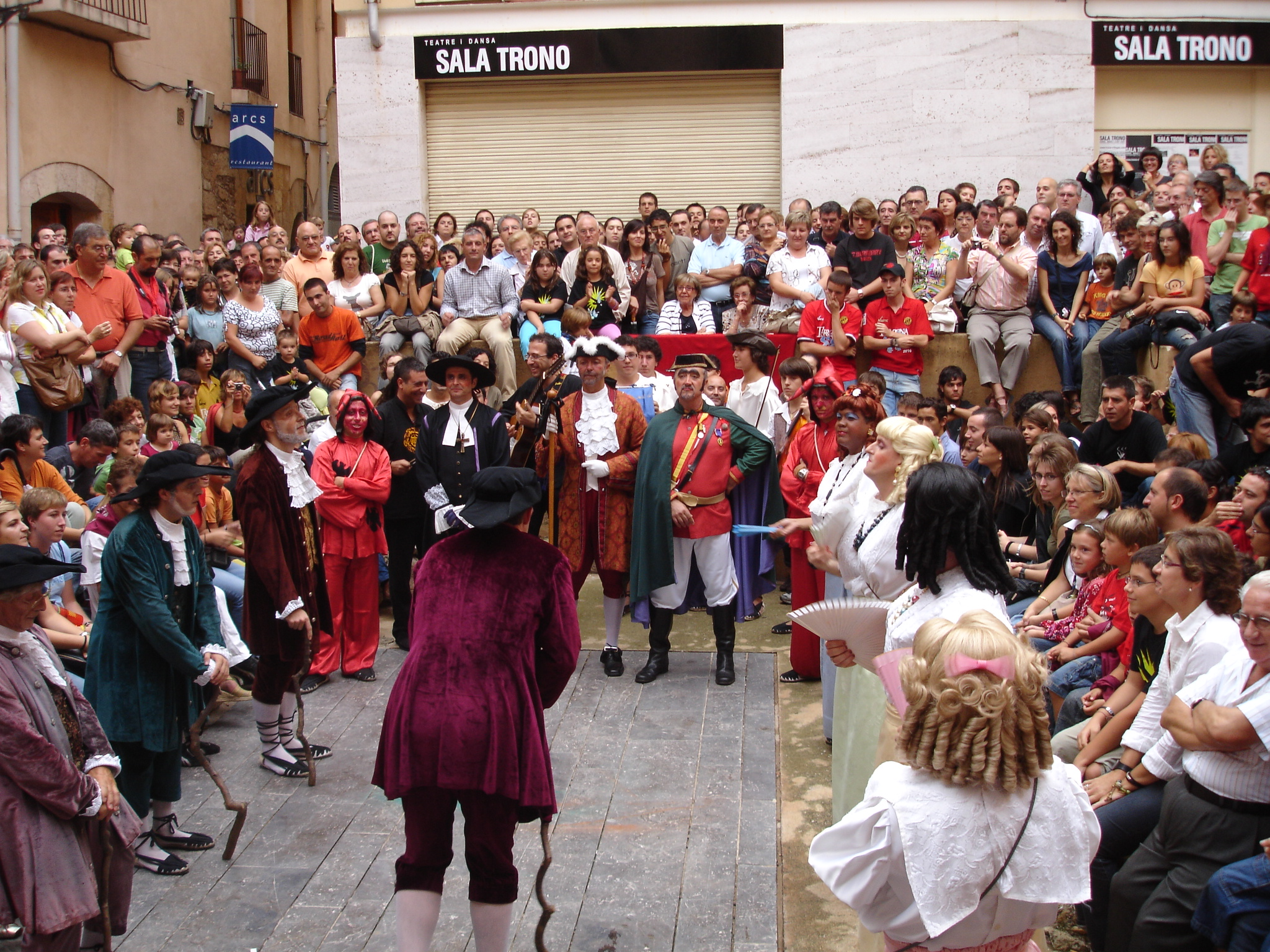
Performance of the Ball de Dames i Vells, Santa Tecla Festival 2007

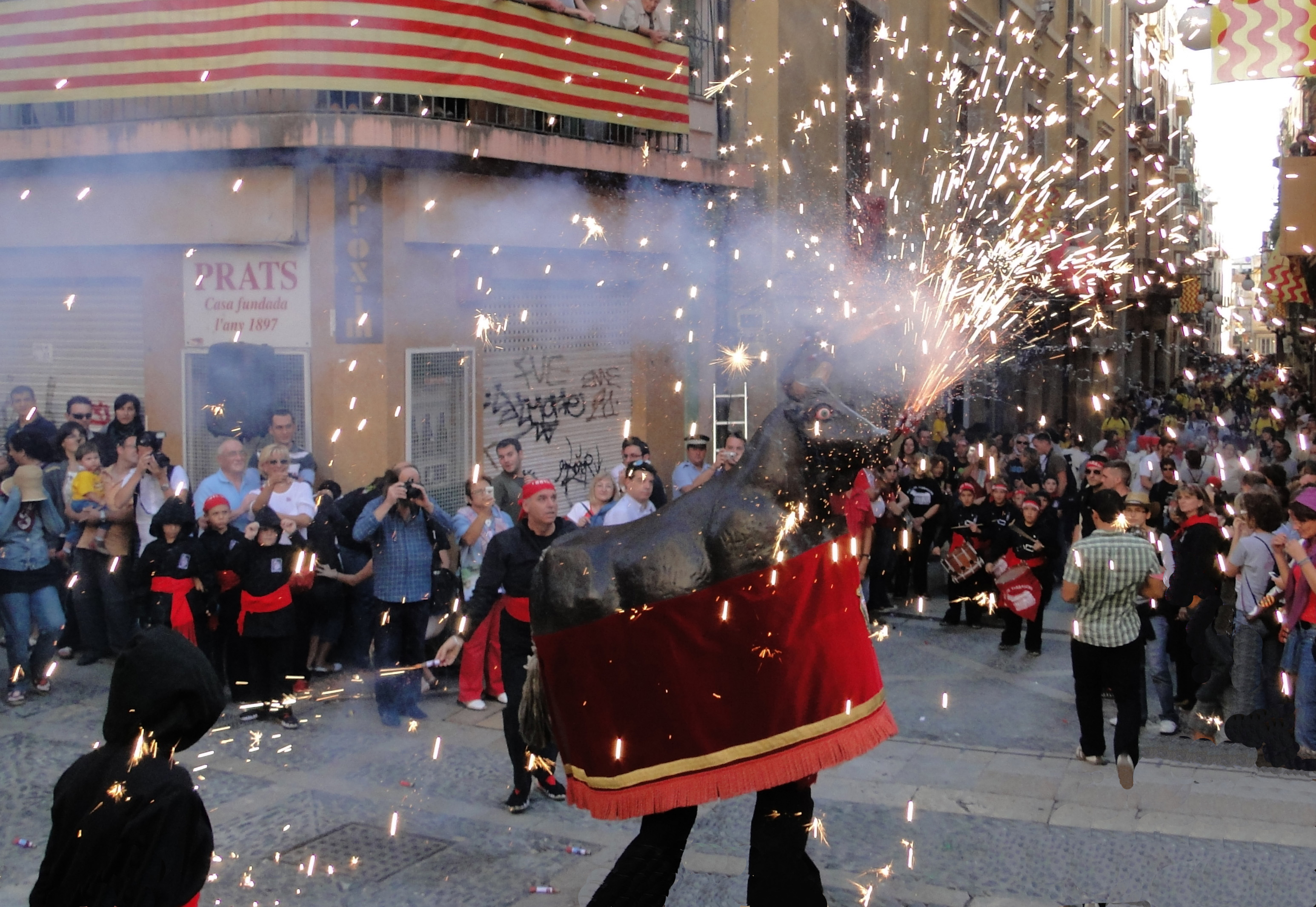
Bou de Tarragona at the 2009 festival

Although in Tarragona the cult to Santa Tecla has existed since ancient times, it was not until the period of the Reconquest that the festivities outline the embryonic structure that will be perpetuated, and that adopt the streets of the city as the essential physical space in which such festivities are to take place.

In 1091, the Pope Urban II restored, if only juridically, the metropolitan seat of Tarragona and declared the festivities of Santa Tecla as a day of obligation and main celebration of the year. However, this was only a phase previous to the effective restoration, which took place several years, later, in 1118, when the count of Barcelona, Ramon Berenguer the Great offered the city to the bishop Olegarius (Oleguer) of Barcelona. It was from that moment on that we refer to a real repopulation of Tarragona. The pontifical bull of Gelasius II ratified the day of Santa Tecla as the main festivity of the year and, of course, as a day of obligation.

The relevance of the path which had been started was confirmed in year 1239 at the first Provincial Council, presided by the archbishop Pere d'Albalat, and in year 1277, at the council, of archbishop, Bernat d'Olivella. Until that moment, however, the festivity is confined within the strictly liturgical framework.

The increasing popularity of the celebration leads to a fact that will become extremely important for the evolution of the Festivities. On 17 May 1321, the relic of the arm of the patroness saint arrives in Tarragona, from Antioch, located in the Orient. The city carried out an absolutely spectacular and overwhelming welcome reception, in such a way that this would become the point of reference for the subsequent structuration of the festivity. For the first time ever, the population, by means of all of its integrating social classes or strata—political, ecclesiastical, soldiers or military men and working class—fills the streets and takes possession of it. Space is filled with the new dances performed by the local guilds which, in a process of syncretism of pre-Christian and Christian rituals, are always made functional the service of the sacred.

The civic significance that this ceremony had, as well as the comparison of the festivity of Santa Tecla to that of Corpus Christi—which was already the object of an outstanding celebration since 1357, at the request of the archbishop Sanç López d’Ayerbe—will lead to the establishment of the solemn celebration of the octave of Santa Tecla from 1359 onwards, and to the publication of a document which is essential to understand the Festivities: the Bylaws of Santa Tecla, which on 26 July 1370, archbishop Pere Clasquerí establishes at the request of the consuls of the city.

The philosophy of the text puts on the same level the festivity of Santa Tecla and that of Corpus Christi, the essential dates of the local calendar. The structure of the Festivities established for the eve and the day of the patroness saint is maintained until the present times. 22 September is the date set for the singing of vespers at the cathedral, which is the centre of the festivity, as well as the performance of dances by the guilds throughout the city, that is, the Cercavila ("the big parade in the streets") of nowadays. On 23 September, the attendance to religious service is to take place, with the dances and the establishment of the Procession of the Holy Arm, under a canopy, through the streets and preceded by the dances.

Besides, according to the bylaws, the streets of the city should be cleaned up and decorated, particularly those through which the procession is to pass by. The bylaws in question also mention the attendance of the clergy to the procession and the carrying of twenty candles bearing the signal of the city, that the consuls of the town council are to pay for, in order to keep the Arm illuminated.

Besides the dances, which are the embryo of the Popular Retinue, there will be a whole collection of elements which will become core complicated and will progressively complete the spectacular dimension of the festivity. From 1381, we find documentary evidence on "the fantastic and popular bestiary"; since year 1385, "biblical characters"; since year 1399, "the lifeless hagiographic characters"; since year 1402, the games or "allegorical performance representations", which already bore a certain dramatic action; from the second quarter of the 15th century, the roques or castles—moveable platforms in the fashion of the current floats of the Holy Week—and the entremesos. Often enough, the ludic purposes and the catechistical purposes are mixed up with the struggle to exteriorize the municipal and the archiepiscopal powers, and generate an overwhelming growth of the spectacular nature and complexity of the Festivities.

The onset of the 16th century and the outbreak of spoken dances—some of which are new while others are redefined from ancient entremesos and dances—shaped the last part of one of the structures of the festivity that essentially survived without any outstanding alterations until the onset of the 19th century. In any case, we must point out its increasing significance, which is provincial council that is held in Barcelona in year 1564, under the chairmanship of the patriarch of Antioch, D. Fernando de Loazes, who ratifies the feast day of Santa Tecla as an obligation day in all of the ecclesiastical province of Tarragona.

The 19th century will be decisive for the analysis of the evolution of the festivities of Santa Tecla. During the first half of the mentioned century, the morphology, of the castells (human towers) will be defined, as well as the role that these play within the celebration. That relatively new moment, in spite of the fact that the writer Rafael d’Amat, Baron of Maldà, regretted its absence as early as year 1794, will become essential in the festivities of Santa Tecla. In his novel entitled La familia dels Garrigas, Josep Pin i Soler makes a magnificent description of the festivity in the middle of the 19th century. At that time, besides the performances and elements that still survived from the Middle Ages, the extremely significant role played by the groups of human towers was undeniable, and the same applies to the activities that nowadays are essential, such as the Matinades (Early Mornings), with the grallers and the drummers, or the fireworks display of the celebration day of Santa Tecla, or even activities which remain more unknown such as the general chiming of the bells or the chanting of the goigs, in the Cathedral. Also, an emblematic character has been shaped, formed in the festivity: the Magí de les Timbales, the Council drummer.

The second half of the 19th century entailed a new amalgamation of the festivities. On one hand, the Town Hall introduced its own defining elements in the Popular Retinue with a highly impressive artistic level. In this sense, the Moorish Giants, the Negritos Giants (Black Giants) and the Old Nanos, all of them chiselled by Bernat Verderol, seem to want to separate from the most simple and popular elements: dances, which will suffer a remarkable recession, particularly due to the upheaval undergone by the institutions that supported them; guilds, during the first half of the century, as well as the constant attacks that they suffered from the wealthier classes or strata. On the other hand, pyrotechnics become more relevant in the festivity. Noise and rustle play a great role as opposed to that of colour, and this is the reason why the firing of storms increase. The Ball de Diables (Devils' Dance) seems to balance the relationship between light and noise, and is performed for the first time during independent exhibitions, out of the retinue, and is undoubtedly a precedent of the current correfoc. In the last instance, the sardana dance is imported from other Catalan region (Empordà), which will thus be on its way to becoming a national symbol.

The 20th century, until the establishment of the democratic town halls which took place during the seventies and the eighties, will be a somewhat dark period for the collection of the festivities of Santa Tecla. In 1911, Pope Pius X abolishes the festive quality of the saint's day, which becomes a labour day. It was not until 10 July 1917 that pope Benedict XV restored it, upon request of the Town Hall presided by the mayor Robert Guasch, and with technicians as outstanding as Emili Morera. On 3 September, the Spanish government of Eduardo Dato consented to the restitution of the festivity.

The Spanish Civil War of 1936 and the subsequent postwar period cast a dark and gloomy outlook on the main festivity, to the extreme of consigning it to a secondary condition. The authorities of that period distorted and misrepresented the history of the city and promoted the small festivity of Sant Magí to the condition of main festivity, with the idea in mind of using it for attracting tourists in the summer season and thus, to the detriment of the inhabitants of Tarragona.

The arrival of democratic town halls has entailed the vindication of the festivities of Santa Tecla as the celebration of and for the inhabitants of Tarragona. Nowadays, the recovery of the Popular Retinue, which until then had been almost banished, the restoration of the thundering displays, the redemption of the manual tolling of the bells, the diffusion, spreading and improvement of the playing of the gralla and of the drum, the manifoldness of the traditional instruments as well as their application, are some of the peculiarities of the festivities of Santa Tecla that will be noticed when listening to the recordings that we hereby present. In short, the recovery of a city heritage which begins with the use of streets as a space for entertainment.

== Resources ==
- DD.AA.: Les Festes de Santa Tecla. Tarragona, Generalitat de Catalunya-Ajuntament de Tarragona, Barcelona, 1993. (English translation)
