= Aya Tekla Church =

Rock church in Silifke, Mersin Province, Turkey

Coordinates: 36°21′46″N 33°55′51″E

- Ἁγία Θέκλα (Greek)
- Meryemlik
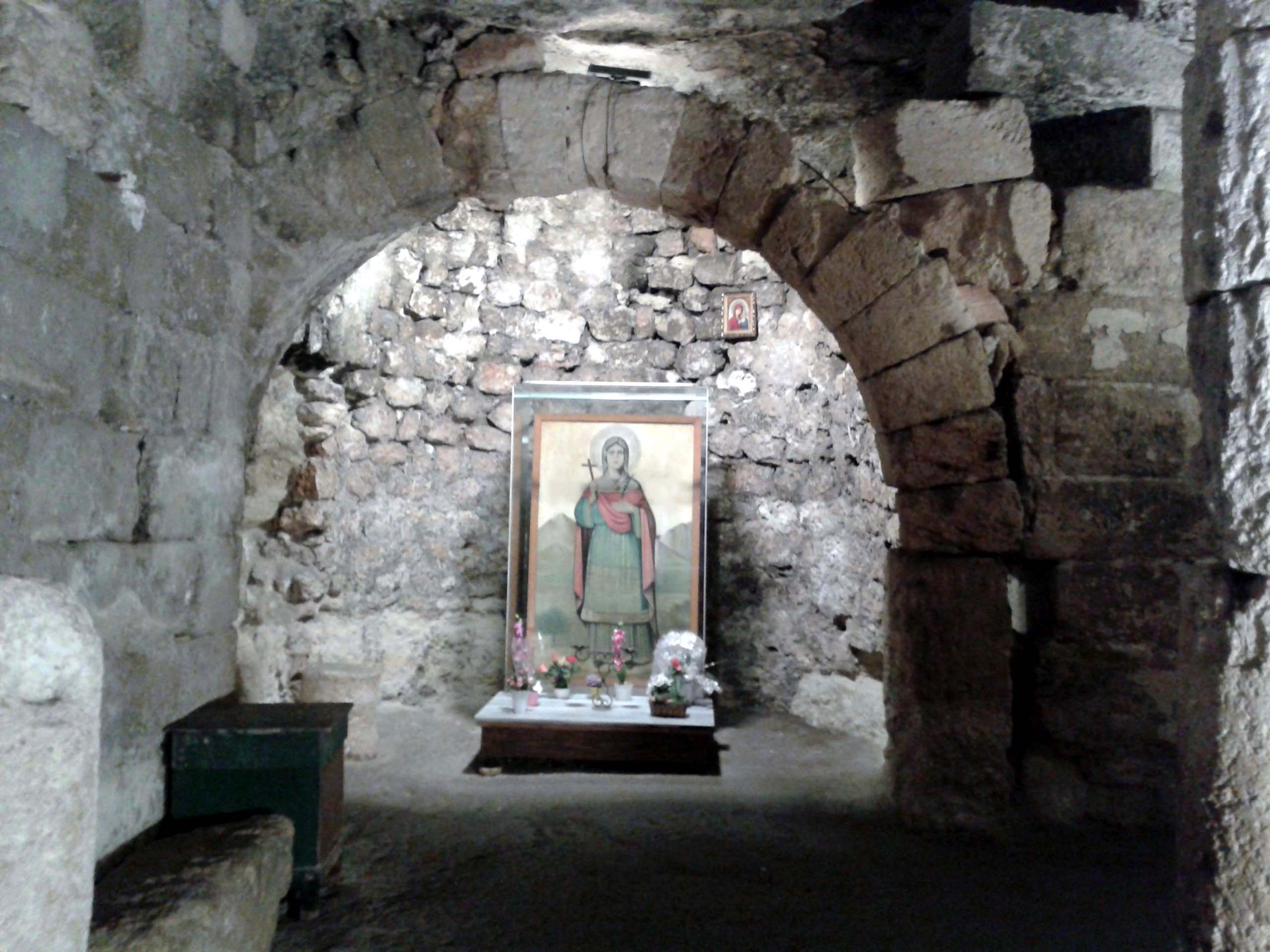
- Cave church of Aya Tekla in Silifke, Turkey

- Location within Turkey
- Type: Church
- Location: Mersin Province, Turkey

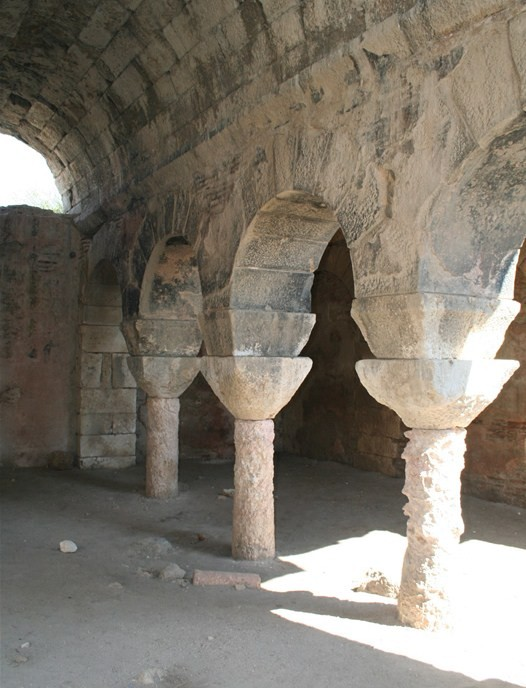
Cistern of Aya Tekla Church ruin

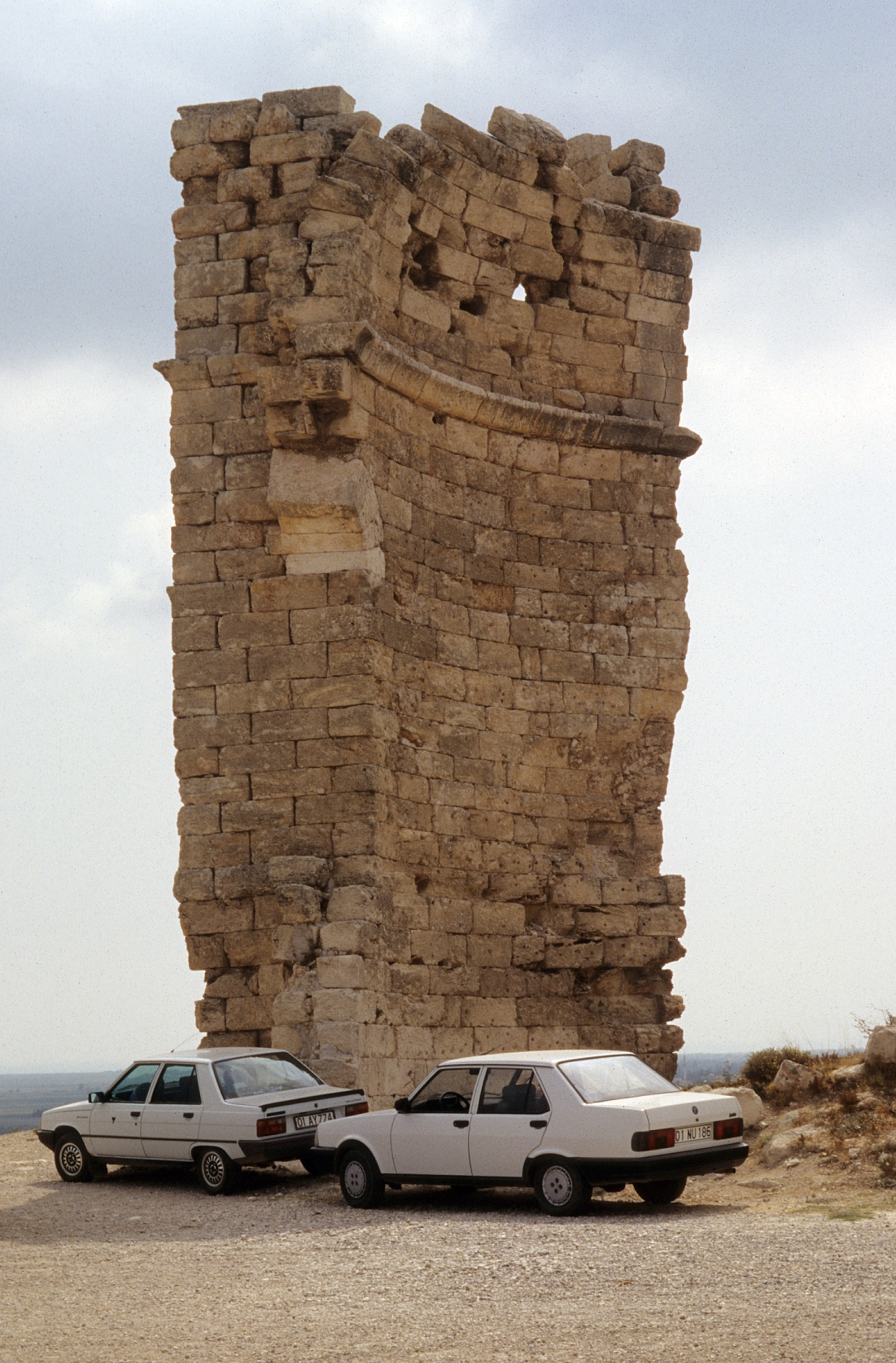
Ruined wall of Aya Tekla Church in Silifke

Ayia Thekla Church (Greek: Ἁγία Θέκλα, Hagia Thékla; Turkish: Aya Tekla Kilisesi), also known as Aya Thecla or Aya Thekla, is a ruined historic church of the Byzantine period in Turkey. It was a popular pilgrimage site, and still attracts visitors today.

== Location ==
Aya Tekla Church is located 4 km (2.5 mi) south of Silifke (ancient Seleucia in Isauria or Seleucia on the Calycadnus) and 85 km (53 mi) from the provincial capital, Mersin. It is situated 1 km (0.62 mi) north of the state highway D.400, which runs parallel to the coast of the Mediterranean Sea.

== History ==
Thecla (Ancient Greek: Θέκλα, Thékla) was a saint of the early Christian Church, and a reported follower of Paul the Apostle. She enjoyed great popularity in the Byzantine period. According to the main work about her, Acts of Paul and Thecla, she was originally from Ikonion, modern Konya, and after the episodes described in the book, she lived around Silifke and died there.

The beginnings of the site are unclear. A site of Thecla's cult near Silifke was visited by Gregory of Nazianzus in 374. Egeria, a woman widely regarded to be the author of a detailed account of a pilgrimage to the Holy Land, visited the site in 384. She mentioned numerous monastic cells for men and women, and a central church with an enclosing wall. The shrine of Thecla was relocated to a hill, now called Meryemlik, meaning "of Virgin Mary", into a cave, which was supposedly Thecla's home in her later years. The grave in the cave supposedly belongs to her.

Up to 312, Thecla's cave was a secret pilgrimage site. At some date, a church was built into the cave. Aya Thekla, the more prominent church, was built on the hilltop in 460–470 by the Byzantine emperor Zeno the Isaurian (reigned 474–475). The church and other related buildings, such as a bath, are now in ruins, the only standing element being a part of the apse. The cave and cistern to the north of the cave are also partially standing.
