= War against the Islamic State =

Military actions against the Islamic State

- Part of the post-Cold War era, war on terror, Iraqi conflict, Syrian civil war and its spillover, Afghan conflict, Libyan crisis, Yemeni crisis, Somali Civil War, Boko Haram insurgency, insurgency in the Maghreb and war in the Sahel, and the insurgency in the North Caucasus
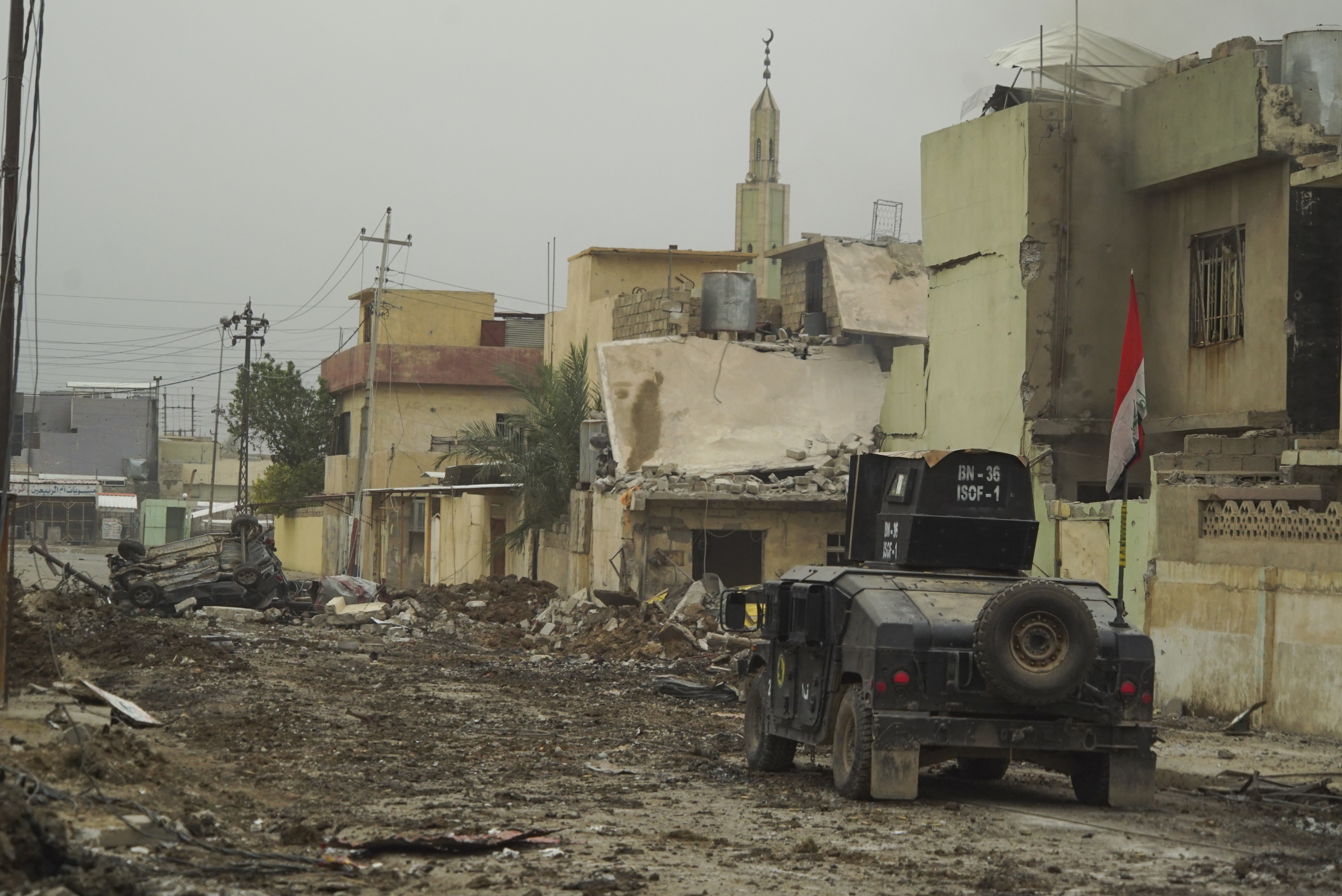
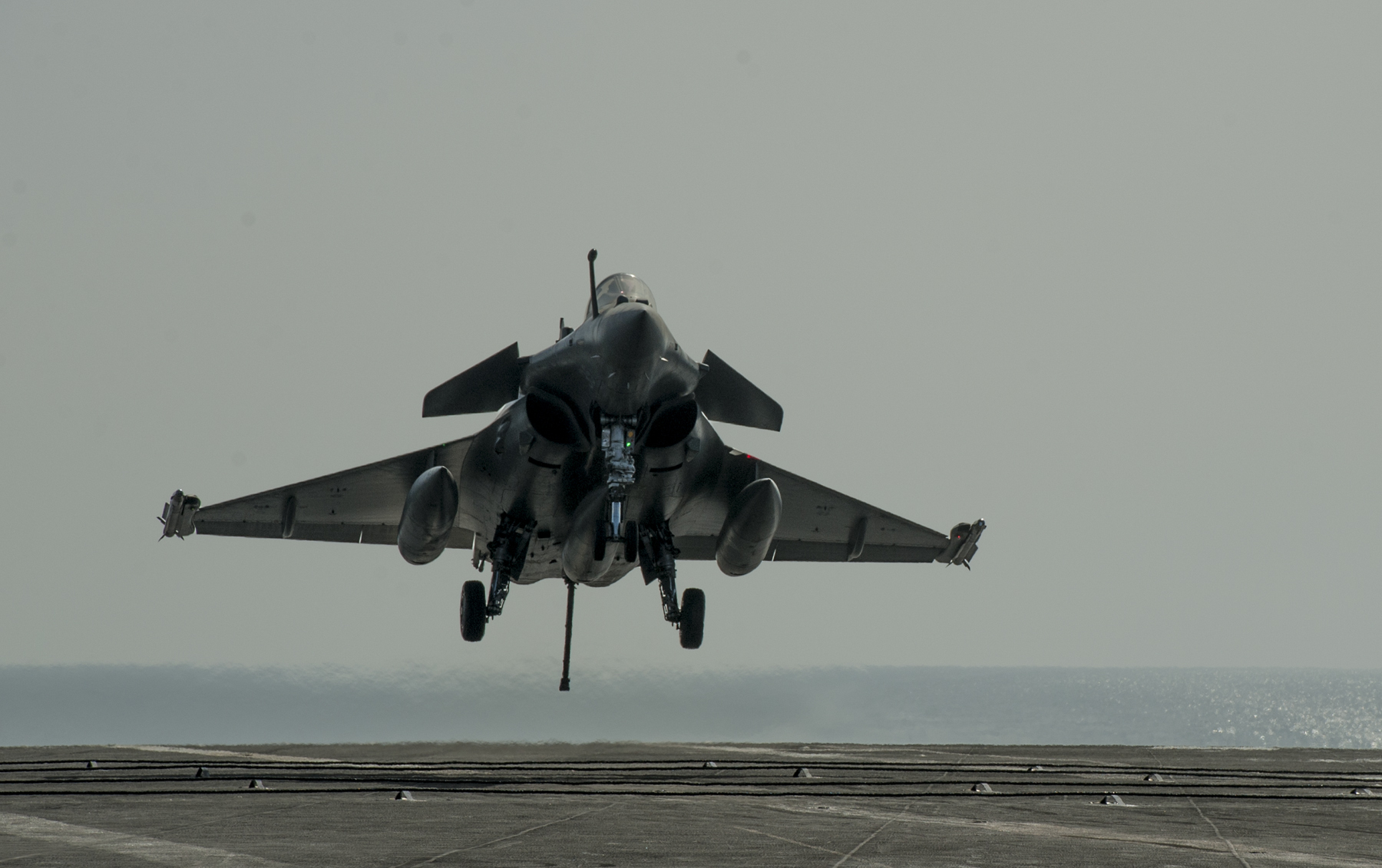
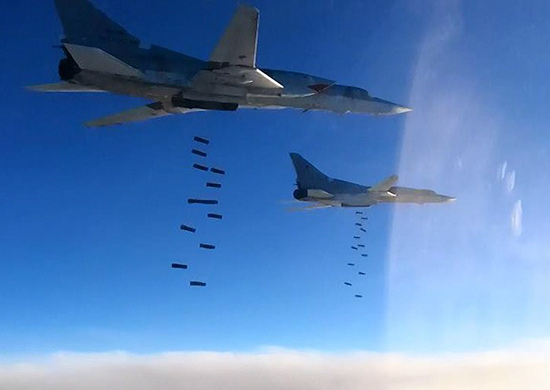
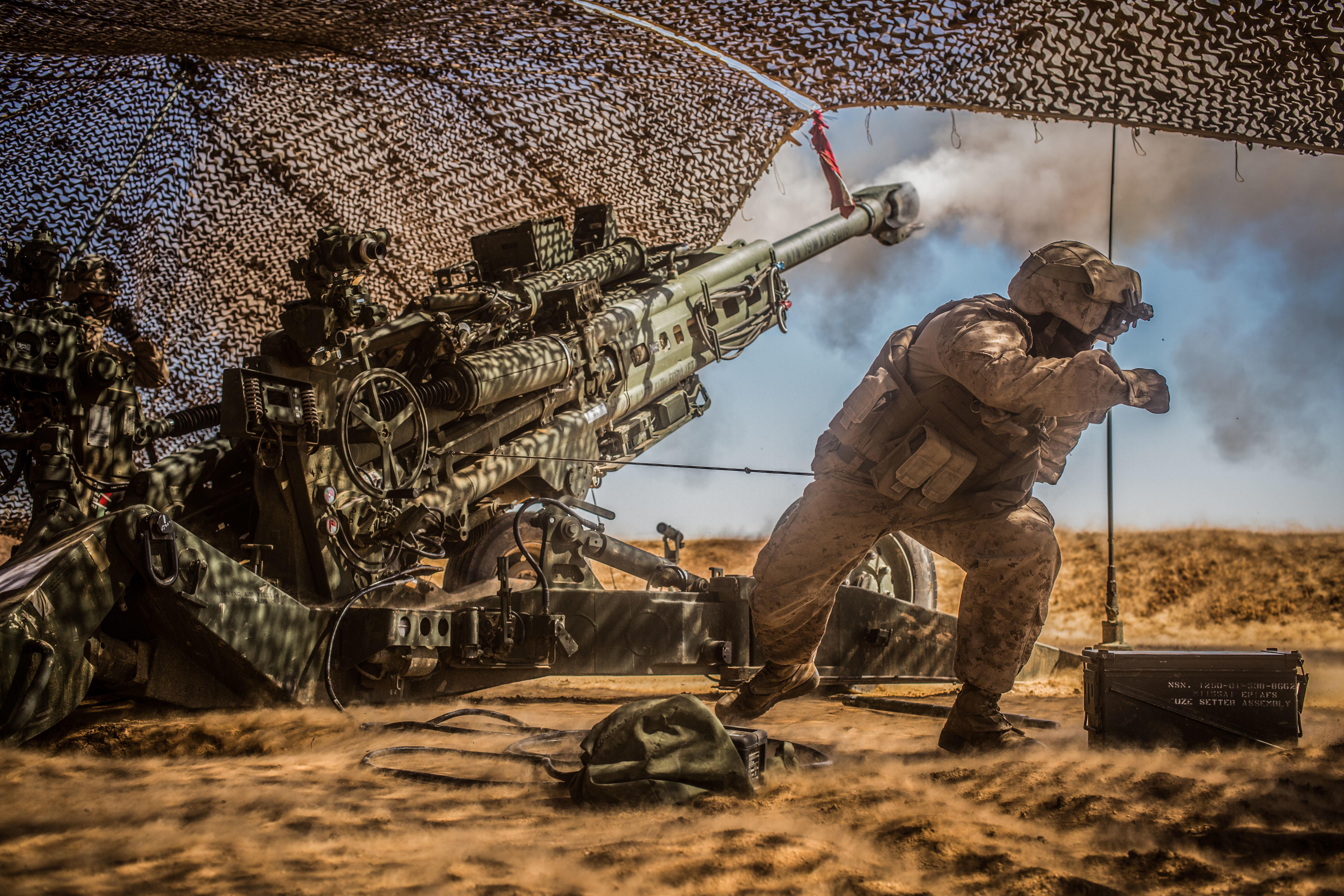
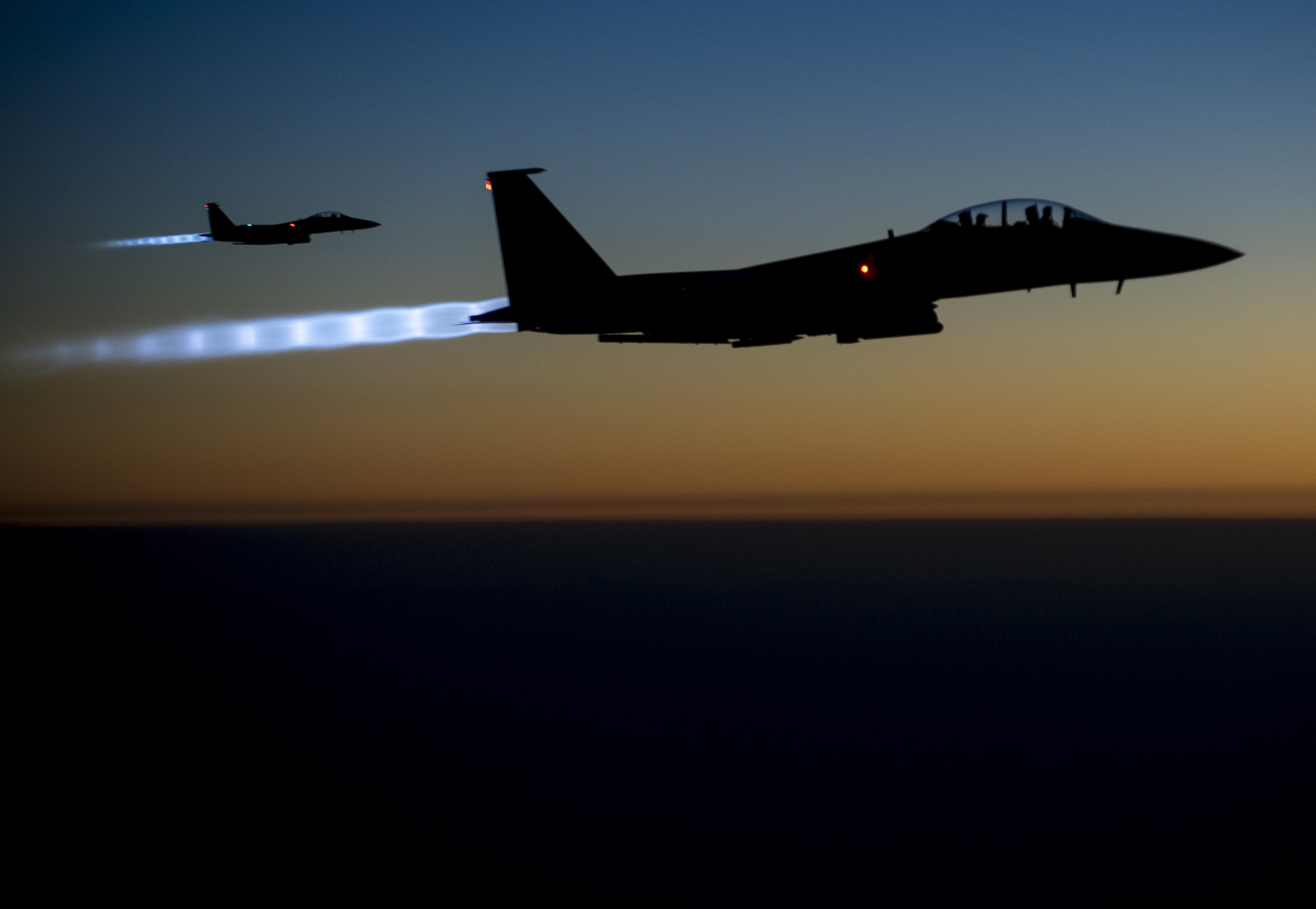
- From top to bottom, left to right: (ISOF) Humvee on the street of Mosul, Northern Iraq, 16 November 2016 during the Battle of Mosul; A French Dassault Rafale lands on USS Carl Vinson during Opération Chammal; A pair of Russian Air Force Tu-22M bombers conducting a strike in Syria; U.S. Marines conduct a fire mission in northern Syria; A pair of U.S. Air Force F-15E Strike Eagle fighters over Iraq; Military situation in the former IS territory in Iraq, Syria and Lebanon as of 31 January 2026; Map of the current military situation in Iraq, Syria, and Lebanon; Map of the current military situation in Libya; Map of the current military situation in Nigeria; Map of the current military situation in Sinai; Map of the current military situation in Yemen
Date	8 April 2013 – present (13 years, 7 months and 2 weeks)
Location	Iraq, Syria, Egypt, Libya, Nigeria, Afghanistan, Mozambique, the North Caucasus, and Southeast Asia
Status	Coalition victory (territorial, in Libya, Afghanistan, Egypt, Syria, Iraq and the Philippines): Ongoing medium-intensity insurgency; Airstrikes on IS positions in Iraq, Syria, Libya, Nigeria and Afghanistan; Multinational humanitarian efforts; Arming and supporting local ground forces; Millions of civilians in Iraq and Syria flee their homes, sparking a refugee crisis; Terrorist attacks in Paris (Jan 2015 and Nov 2015), Brussels (Mar 2016) and many other places; Thousands of civilians executed by IS forces in Iraq and Syria; IS controlled around 40% of Iraq at its peak in mid-2014; IS controlled around 50% of Syria by late May 2015; Emergence of independently-governed Kurdish regions; IS military defeated and lost all of its territory in Libya in December 2017; Boko Haram loses territory, but its insurgency continues; IS controlled 5.67% of Syria's land by November 2017 and around 3% of Iraq by October 2017; IS loses all territory in Iraq and most territory in Syria in December 2017; IS loses all remaining territory in Syria in March 2019; IS in Egypt appears to be dormant since 2023

Belligerents
In multiple regions: CJTF–OIR; IMCTC; In Iraq: Iraq; Iraqi Kurdistan; United States; Iran; United Kingdom; France; Canada; In Syria: Ba'athist Syria (2013–2024); Iran (2013–2024); Russia (2015–2024); Syria (2024–present); Turkey; United States; Jordan; Saudi Arabia; Syrian opposition; Syrian Salvation Government (2017–2024); Syrian Interim Government (2013–2025); Autonomous Administration of North and East Syria (2015–2026); United States; In Egypt: Egypt (conflict since 2014); Israel; Hamas; In Libya: Libya Tripoli-based government (2015–present) Tobruk-based government (2014–present); Egypt; France; United States; In Afghanistan: Islamic Republic of Afghanistan (2015–2021); Islamic Emirate of Afghanistan (since 2021) (the Taliban, in a conflict with IS since 2015); In Pakistan: Pakistan; In West Africa: Multinational Joint Task Force; AES	Islamic State: Wilayat Libya (in Libya); Wilayat Sinai (in the Sinai peninsula); Wilayat West Africa (in West Africa); Wilayat Sahil (in the Sahel); Wilayat Central Africa (in Central Africa); Wilayat Mozambique (in Mozambique); Wilayat Khorasan (in Afghanistan and Iran); Wilayat Qavqaz (in the North Caucasus); Abu Sayyaf (in Southeast Asia); Wilayat Somalia (in Somalia); Wilayat Pakistan (in Pakistan)

Commanders and leaders
- Donald Trump (2017–2021; 2025–)
- Pete Hegseth (2025–)
- (United Kingdom) Andy Burnham (2026–)
- (United Kingdom) Wes Streeting (2026–)
- (France) Emmanuel Macron (2017–)
- (France) Catherine Vautrin (2025–)
- Anthony Albanese (2022–)
- Bart De Wever (2025–)
- Theo Francken (2025–)
- (Bahrain) Hamad Al Khalifa
- Mette Frederiksen (2019–)
- Troels Lund Poulsen (2023–)
- Mark Carney (2025–)
- David McGuinty (2025–)
- Friedrich Merz (2025–)
- Boris Pistorius (2023–)
- Giorgia Meloni (2022–)
- Guido Crosetto (2022–)
Allies
- Abdullah II
  (Morocco) Mohammed VI
  (Netherlands) Rob Jetten (2026–)
  Dilan Yeşilgöz (2026–)
  (Norway) Jonas Gahr Støre (2021–)
  (Norway) Tore O. Sandvik (2025–)
  (Qatar) Tamim Al Thani
  (Saudi Arabia) Salman (2015–)
  Recep Tayyip Erdoğan
  Yaşar Güler (2023–)
  (United Arab Emirates) Mohamed bin Zayed (2022–)
  (Albania) Ilir Meta (2017–2022)
- (Syria) Ahmed al-Sharaa (2024–)
Allies
- (Turkey) Recep Tayyip Erdoğan
- (Iraq) Ali al-Zaidi (2026–)
- Nechirvan Barzani (2019–)
- (Libya) Fayez Al-Sarraj (2016–)
- (Iran) Mojtaba Khamenei (2026–)
Allies
- (Hezbollah) Naim Qassem (2024–)
  (Russia) Vladimir Putin
  (Russia) Mikhail Mishustin (2020–)
  (Russia) Andrey Belousov (2024–)
- (Lebanon) Joseph Aoun (2025–)
- (Pakistan) Shehbaz Sharif (2022–2023; 2024–)
- (Afghanistan) Hibatullah Akhundzada (2016–)
- (Egypt) Abdel Fattah el-Sisi
- (Nigeria) Bola Tinubu (2023–)
- (Chad) Mahamat Déby (2021–)
- (Cameroon) Paul Biya
Allies
- (Burundi) Évariste Ndayishimiye (2020–)
- (Niger) Abdourahamane Tiani (2023–)
- (Burkina Faso) Ibrahim Traoré (2022-)
- (Mali) Assimi Goïta (2021-)
Former leaders
Joe Biden (2021–2025)
Lloyd Austin (2021–2025)
Barack Obama (until 2017)
Chuck Hagel (until 2015)
Ash Carter (2015–2017)
Jim Mattis (2017–2019)
Mark Esper (2019–2020)
Keir Starmer (2024–2026)
Rishi Sunak (2022–2024)
Liz Truss (2022)
Boris Johnson (2019–2022)
Theresa May (2016–2019)
David Cameron (until 2016)
Philip Hammond (2014)
Michael Fallon (2014–2017)
Gavin Williamson (2017–2019)
Penny Mordaunt (2019)
Ben Wallace (2019–2023)
Grant Shapps (2023–2025)
- (United Kingdom) John Healey (2024–2026)
  (United Kingdom) Dan Jarvis (2026)
(France) François Hollande (until 2017)
(France) Jean-Yves Le Drian (2014–2017)
(France) Sylvie Goulard (2017)
(France) Florence Parly (2017–2022)
(France) Sébastien Lecornu (2022-2025)
(France) Bruno Le Maire (2025)
Scott Morrison (2018–2022)
Malcolm Turnbull (2015–2018)
Tony Abbott (until 2015)
Dennis Richardson (2015–2017)
Alexander De Croo (2020–2025)
Sophie Wilmès (2019–2020)
Charles Michel (2014–2019)
Elio Di Rupo (until 2014)
Pieter De Crem (2014)
Steven Vandeput (2014–2018)
Didier Reynders (2018–2019)
Philippe Goffin (2019–2020)
Ludivine Dedonder (2020–2025)
Justin Trudeau (2015–2025)
Stephen Harper (until 2015)
Robert Nicholson (2014–2015)
Jason Kenney (2015)
Anita Anand (2021–2023)
Bill Blair (from 2023)
Lars Løkke Rasmussen (2015–2019)
Helle Thorning-Schmidt (until 2015)
Nicolai Wammen (2014–2015)
Carl Holst (2015)
Peter Christensen (2015–2016)
Claus Hjort Frederiksen (2015–2019)
Trine Bramsen (2019–2022)
Morten Bødskov (2022)
Jakob Ellemann-Jensen (2022–2023)
Olaf Scholz (2021–2025)
Angela Merkel (until 2021)
Ursula von der Leyen (2014–2019)
Annegret Kramp-Karrenbauer (2019–2021)
Christine Lambrecht (2021–2023)
Mario Draghi (2021–2022)
Giuseppe Conte (2018–2021)
Paolo Gentiloni (2016–2018)
Matteo Renzi (until 2016)
Roberta Pinotti (2014–2018)
Elisabetta Trenta (2018–2019)
Lorenzo Guerini (2019–2022)
(Netherlands) Mark Rutte (2010–2024)
(Netherlands) Dick Schoof (2024-2026)
Jeanine Hennis-Plasschaert (2014–2017)
Ank Bijleveld (2017–2021)
Henk Kamp (2021–2022)
Kajsa Ollongren (2022–2024)
(Netherlands) Dick Schoof (2024-2026)
Ruben Brekelmans (2024-2026)
(Norway) Erna Solberg (until 2021)
(Norway) Ine Eriksen Søreide (2014–2017)
(Norway) Frank Bakke-Jensen (2017–2021)
(Norway) Odd Roger Enoksen (2021–2022)
(Norway) Bjørn Arild Gram (2022–2025)
(Saudi Arabia) King Abdullah # (until 2015)
İsmet Yılmaz (2015–2016)
Vecdi Gönül (2015)
Fikri Işık (2016–2017)
Nurettin Canikli (2017–2018)
Hulusi Akar (2018–2023)
(Russia) Dmitri Medvedev (until 2020)
(Russia) Sergei Shoigu (until 2024)
(Iraq) Iyad Allawi (2014–2018)
(Iraq) Adil Abdul-Mahdi (2018–2020)
(Iraq) Haider al-Abadi (2014–2018)
(Iraq) Nouri al-Maliki (until 2014)
Masoud Barzani (until 2017)
(Pakistan) Imran Khan (2018–2022)
(Pakistan) Shahid Khaqan Abbasi (2017–2018)
(Pakistan) Nawaz Sharif (until 2017)
(Islamic Republic of Afghanistan) Ashraf Ghani (2015–2021)
(Taliban) Akhtar Mansour † (2015–2016)
(Nigeria) Goodluck Jonathan (until 2015)
(Nigeria) Muhammadu Buhari (until 2023)
(Chad) Idriss Déby † (until 2021)
(Niger) Mohamed Bazoum (2021–2023)
(Niger) Mahamadou Issoufou (until 2021)
(Burundi) Pierre Nkurunziza † (until 2020)
(Lebanon) Michel Aoun (until 2022)
(Iran) Ali Khamenei X (until 2026)
(Syria) Bashar al-Assad (until 2024)
(Iran) Qasem Soleimani † (until 2020)
(Hezbollah) Hassan Nasrallah † (until 2024)
- Abu Hafs al-Hashimi al-Qurashi (Leader)
Former Leaders
- Abu Bakr al-Baghdadi X
  (Former leader)
  Abu Ibrahim al-Hashimi al-Qurashi ‡‡
  (Former leader)
  Abu al-Hasan al-Hashimi al-Qurashi ‡‡
  (Former leader)
  Abu al-Hussein al-Husseini al-Qurashi ‡‡
  (Former leader)
  (Islamic State) Abu Ali al-Anbari †
  (Deputy Leader of IS)
  Abu Ayman al-Iraqi † (Head of Military Shura)
  Abu Muslim al-Turkmani † (Deputy Leader, Iraq)
  Abu Osama al-Masri † (Emir of Sinai)
  Abu Omar al-Shishani † (Chief commander in Syria)
  Abu Muhammad al-Kadari † (former IS commander of the North Caucasus)
  Abu Nabil al-Anbari † (former IS commander of North Africa)
  Abu Abdullah al-Filipini † (IS Emir of the Philippines and Co-Leader of Abu Sayyaf)
  Abu Musab al-Barnawi (IS Emir of West Africa)

Strength
United States: 4,100 troops (in Iraq); 2,500 troops (in Kuwait); 7,000 contractors; 500 soldiers to retrain the Iraqi army; Australia: 400 RAAF personnel; 200 special forces troops; 300+ regular soldiers (combined with 100+ New Zealand soldiers); Canada: Up to 200 special forces advisers; 830 Canadian Armed Forces personnel; France: 1,000 French Armed Forces personnel; Germany: 1200 troops; Italy: 130 search and rescue team; 1,200 troops; Albania: 30 Soldiers; Russia: 4,000 personnel; Iran: 500 Quds Force members; 1,500 Basijis; Nigeria: Army: 130,000 active frontline troops. 32,000 active reserve troops.; Police Force: 371,000 officers; Cameroon: 20,000 soldiers; African Union: 8,700 soldiers; Syrian Salvation Government: 50,000+ soldiers; Islamic Front (2013-2015); 26,000-30,000 soldiers; Afghan Taliban: 168,000 soldiers; 210,121 police forces and pro-Taliban militia; Pakistan: 200,000-345,000 soldiers; 90,000-120,000 paramilitary forces	IS: 200,000 in Iraq and Syria (claim by Iraqi Kurdistan Chief of Staff); 28,600–31,600 in Iraq and Syria (Defense Department estimate); 35,000–100,000 (State Department estimate); 1,500+ in Egypt; 6,500–10,000 in Libya; 7,000–10,000 in Nigeria; 1,000–3,000 in Afghanistan; At least 400 in the Philippines and Malaysia; Up to 600 tanks

Casualties and losses
Iraq: 70,000+ killed and 13,000+ wounded; (Democratic Autonomous Administration of North and East Syria) DAANES: 11,000+ fighters killed; Ba'athist Syria: 40,000+ soldiers killed; (Syria) Syrian Opposition (2011–2024): 3,378+ fighters killed; (Kurdistan Region) Iraqi Kurdistan: 1,500+ fighters killed; 6,000+ fighters wounded; 52 fighters missing; Egypt: 3,277+ security forces killed; 12,280+ personnel injured; Chad: 101 servicemen killed; Turkey: 76 servicemen killed 6 police officers killed; Nigeria: 48 servicemen killed; Iran: 35 servicemen killed; Russia: 28 servicemen killed; Niger: 9 servicemen killed; United States: 6 servicemen killed; 16 servicemen wounded; Cameroon: 6 servicemen killed; Saudi Arabia: 3 border guards killed; Canada: 1 serviceman killed; France: 2 servicemen killed; United Kingdom: 3 servicemen killed; Jordan: 1 serviceman killed; 129,483 killed overall 31,296 injured overall	Islamic State: 80,000+ killed in Iraq and Syria since 2014; 41,459+ killed in Syria per SOHR; 1,500–2,500 killed in Libya; 974 killed in Philippines; 300 killed in Afghanistan; 1,000+ killed in Egypt; 83,000+ militants killed overall
- 13,568+ Iraqi civilians killed by Islamic State; 5,939+ Syrian civilians killed by Islamic State; 8,317–13,190 civilians killed by Coalition airstrikes in Iraq and Syria (per Airwars); 1,417 civilians killed by Coalition airstrikes in Iraq and Syria (per Coalition); 4,096–6,085 civilians killed by Russian airstrikes in Syria; 3,300,000 Iraqi civilians displaced; Support: Military aid: Albania; Bosnia and Herzegovina; Bulgaria; Croatia; Cyprus; Czech Republic; Estonia; Canada; Greece; Hungary; Italy; Kuwait; Lebanon; NATO; Spain; Singapore; Unnamed Middle Eastern countries; Unnamed Eastern European countries; Humanitarian aid: European Union; Austria; Indonesia; Ireland; Japan; Luxembourg; New Zealand; Poland; Slovakia; Slovenia; South Korea; Sweden; Taiwan; Intelligence aid: Israel; Local forces: Local forces in Iraq: Federal government of Iraq (supported by U.S. and RSII coalitions); Shi'a militias (supported by Iran); Asa'ib Ahl al-Haq; Badr Organization; Kata'ib Hezbollah; Promised Day Brigade; (Kurdistan Region) Iraqi Kurdistan; Iraqi Turkmen Front (supported by Turkey); Nineveh Plain Protection Units; Local forces in Syria: Ba'athist Syria (supported by Russia and Iran); (Syria) Syrian Opposition (U.S. & allies); (Democratic Autonomous Administration of North and East Syria) Syrian Kurdistan (U.S. & allies, Russia & foreign Kurds); Syrian Turkmen Brigades (supported by Turkey); Local forces in Lebanon: Lebanon; Hezbollah; Lebanese Communist Party; Egyptian-led intervention: (in Libya); Egypt; Libya Nigerian-led intervention: (Boko Haram as part of the IS since 2015); Nigeria; Cameroon; Chad; Niger; Burundi; United States; See also: American military intervention Islamic Military Alliance: Bahrain; Bangladesh; Benin; Chad; Comoros; Cote d'Ivoire; Djibouti; Egypt; Gabon; Guinea; Jordan; Kuwait; Lebanon; Libya; Maldives; Mali; Malaysia; Morocco; Mauritania; Niger; Nigeria; Pakistan; Qatar; Saudi Arabia; Senegal; Sierra Leone; Somalia; Sudan; Turkey; Togo; Tunisia; United Arab Emirates; Yemen

Many states began to intervene against the Islamic State (IS), in both the Syrian civil war and the War in Iraq (2013–2017), in response to its rapid territorial gains from its 2014 invasion of Iraq, widely condemned executions, human rights abuses and the fear of further spillovers of the Syrian civil war. In later years, there were also minor interventions by some states against IS-affiliated groups in Nigeria and Libya. All these efforts significantly degraded the Islamic State's capabilities by around 2019–2020. While moderate fighting continues in Syria, as of 2026, IS has been contained to a small area and force capability.

In mid-June 2014, Iran, according to American and British information, started flying drones over Iraq, and Iranian soldiers were in Iraq fighting IS. Simultaneously, the US ordered a small number of troops to Iraq and started flying crewed aircraft over Iraq. In July 2014, Iran sent Sukhoi Su-25 aircraft to Iraq, and Hezbollah purportedly sent trainers and advisers to Iraq in order to help Shia militias to monitor IS's movements. In August 2014, the US and Iran separately began a campaign of airstrikes on IS targets in Iraq. Since then, fourteen countries in a US-led coalition have also executed airstrikes on IS in Iraq and in Syria. Starting from September 2014, the US began closely co-operating with Saudi Arabia and Jordan to wage a co-ordinated aerial bombing campaign against IS targets across Iraq and Syria.

In September 2015, Russian forces launched their military intervention in Syria to support their ally, Bashar al-Assad, in the fight against the Islamic State. Although Moscow officially portrayed its intervention as an anti-IS campaign and publicly declared support for the "patriotic Syrian opposition", the vast majority of its bombings were focused on destroying bases of the Syrian opposition militias of the Free Syrian Army (FSA) and Southern Front. On the other hand, the United States and its Western allies have been opposed to the former Ba'athist regime for its purported state-sponsorship of terrorism, violent repression of the Syrian revolution and extensive use of chemical weapons. The US-led coalition trained, equipped and supported secular Free Syrian and Kurdish militias opposed to the Assad government during its anti-IS campaign. In the months following the beginning of both air campaigns, IS began to lose ground in both Iraq and Syria. Civilian deaths from airstrikes began to mount in 2015 and 2016. In mid-2016, the US and Russia planned to begin coordinating their airstrikes; however, this coordination did not materialize.

As of December 2017, IS was estimated to control no territory in Iraq, and 5% of Syrian territory, after prolonged actions. On 9 December 2017, Iraq declared victory in the fight against ISIL and stated that the War in Iraq was over. On 23 March 2019, IS was defeated territorially in Syria after losing the Battle of Baghuz Fawqani, after which the group was forced into an insurgency. IS's leader, Abu Bakr al-Baghdadi, died during a US special operations raid in northern Syria in October 2019 and was succeeded by Abu Ibrahim al-Hashimi al-Qurashi. In August 2020, over 10,000 IS fighters were estimated to remain in Syria and Iraq, mainly as sleeper cells.

== International coalitions against the Islamic State ==
=== US-led coalitions ===
On the margins of the 4/5 September 2014 NATO summit in Wales, on 5 September 2014, U.S. Secretary of State John Kerry invited Ministers of Australia, Canada, Denmark, France, Germany, Italy, Turkey and the United Kingdom, for a separate meeting in which he pressed them to support the fight against ISIL militarily and financially. Those nine countries agreed to do so by supporting anti-ISIL forces in Iraq and Syria with supplies and air support, according to a statement that day from Kerry and U.S. Secretary of Defense Hagel. In September 2014, Jordanian and Saudi Air Forces began their co-ordination with United States to wage a joint aerial bombing campaign against IS bases in its territories across Iraq and Syria.

On 17 October 2014, the Department of Defense formally established Combined Joint Task Force – Operation Inherent Resolve (CJTF-OIR)—"in order to formalize ongoing military actions against the rising threat posed by ISIS in Iraq and Syria."

On 3 December 2014, at the NATO headquarters in Brussels, diplomats and foreign ministers from 59 countries gathered to plot a way forward against the threat of ISIL. U.S. Secretary of State John Kerry told the gathering, that "defeating the ideology, the funding, the recruitment" of Daesh (ISIL) must be the primary focus of their discussion, more important than airstrikes and other military action.

The countries represented on 3 December were: the nine countries of the above-mentioned 5 September coalition in Wales (see above); the extra 18 countries of the 15 September France-led coalition in Paris (see below) except for China and Russia; and 33 additional countries: Albania, Austria, Bosnia-Herzegovina, Bulgaria, Croatia, Cyprus, Estonia, Finland, Georgia, Greece, Hungary, Israel, Iceland, Ireland, Kosovo, Latvia, Lithuania, Luxembourg, Macedonia, Moldova, Montenegro, Morocco, New Zealand, Portugal, South Korea, Romania, Serbia, Singapore, Slovakia, Slovenia, Somalia, Sweden, Taiwan and Ukraine.

They styled themselves as the Global Coalition to Counter the Islamic State of Iraq and the Levant (ISIL), and agreed to a strategy that included:

- exposing ISIL's true nature;
- cutting off ISIL's financing and funding;
- supporting military operations.

=== France-led coalition ===
On 15 September 2014, at the 'International Conference on Peace and Security in Iraq' hosted by the French President François Hollande in Paris, 26 countries were represented: the countries of a US-led coalition that on 5 September in Wales (see above) had agreed on a coalition against ISIL except Australia and Poland, and furthermore Bahrain, Egypt, Iraq, Jordan, Kuwait, Lebanon, Oman, Qatar, Saudi Arabia, United Arab Emirates, Belgium, China, Czech Republic, Japan, the Netherlands, Norway, Russia and Spain. They committed themselves to supporting the Iraqi government with military assistance in its fight against ISIL, and they reaffirmed their commitment to UNSC Resolution 2170 of 15 August (condemning all trade with ISIL and urging to prevent all financial donations and all payments of ransoms to ISIL), so reported the French government.

In retaliation for the November 2015 Paris attacks, the French Air Force significantly intensified airstrikes against ISIL targets in Syria, hitting among other targets the Syrian city of Raqqa, the de facto capital of ISIL. The French Navy deployed the aircraft carrier Charles de Gaulle with eighteen Rafale, eight Mirage 2000, two E-2 Hawkeye and 4 helicopters. The aircraft carrier travelled with the frigate Chevalier Paul and HMS Kent.

=== Russia-led coalition ===
At the end of September 2015, Russia, Iraq, Iran and Syria set up a 'joint information center' in Baghdad to gather, process and analyse intelligence regarding ISIL and operations near the Syria-Iraq border. On 30 September 2015, Russia began its air campaign on the side and in support of the Syrian government.

Russia was also reported to have reached agreements on co-ordination of operations in Syria with Jordan and Israel.

On 14 March 2016, Russian President Vladimir Putin announced a partial withdrawal from Syrian territory, citing the success of the ongoing ceasefire and greater security of the Syrian government.

On 10 December 2017 Vladimir Putin ordered a similar withdrawal of Russian forces from Syria, stating that a complete withdrawal would be dependent on the ongoing situation.

=== Muslim states' coalition ===
On 14 December 2015, Saudi Deputy Crown Prince and Defense Minister Mohammed bin Salman Al Saud announced that 34 countries would join in the fight against Muslim extremism, which he called a "disease." Based out of Riyadh, Saudi Arabia, the coalition includes Bahrain, Bangladesh, Benin, Chad, Comoros, Côte d'Ivoire, Djibouti, Egypt, Gabon, Guinea, Jordan, Kuwait, Lebanon, Libya, Maldives, Mali, Malaysia, Morocco, Mauritania, Niger, Nigeria, Pakistan, Palestine, Qatar, Saudi Arabia, Senegal, Sierra Leone, Somalia, Sudan, Turkey, Togo, Tunisia, the United Arab Emirates and Yemen.

== Syria ==
=== US-led intervention in Syria ===
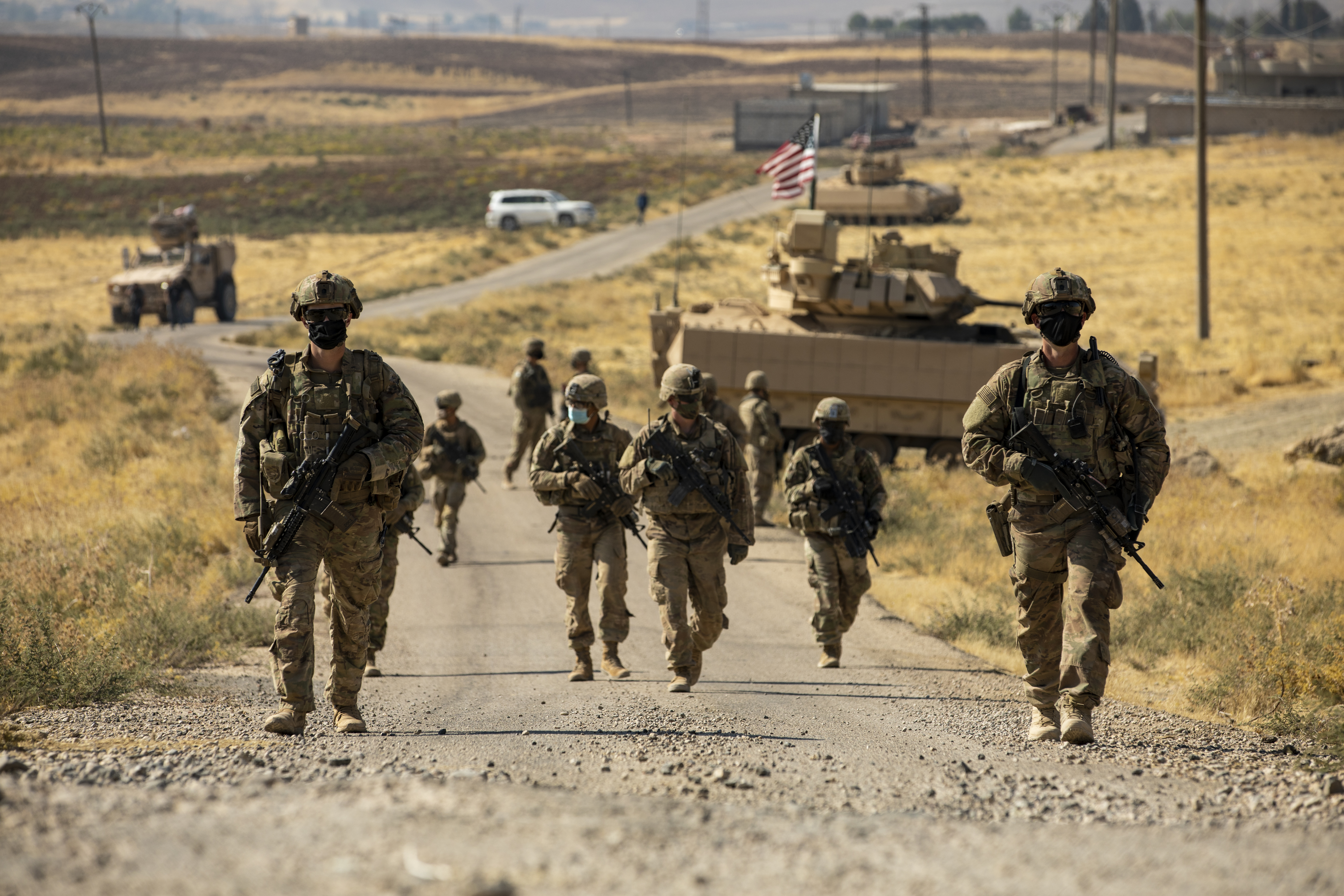
U.S. soldiers from 1st Battalion, 6th Infantry Regiment near an oil facility in eastern Syria, 27 October 2020

==== Hostage rescue attempt ====
On 4 July 2014, the U.S. bombed the "Osama bin Laden" ISIL military base in the village of Uqayrishah, Syria. Two dozen American Delta Force operators then touched down in an effort to rescue hostages, including James Foley. The effort failed, with the hostages having been moved to another location days prior. In a series of videos, Foley, Steven Joel Sotloff, and several more hostages were murdered.

==== Aerial surveillance ====
On 26 August 2014, the U.S. began sending surveillance flights, including drones, into Syria to gather intelligence. The Syrian Arab Republic was not asked for permission.
On 28 August, speaking about combating ISIL in Syria, President Obama said "we don't have a strategy yet."

The British Royal Air Force has been operating over Syria in a surveillance role since 21 October 2014, making the UK the first Western country other than the United States to operate in both Iraq and Syria simultaneously.

==== Arming and training rebels ====
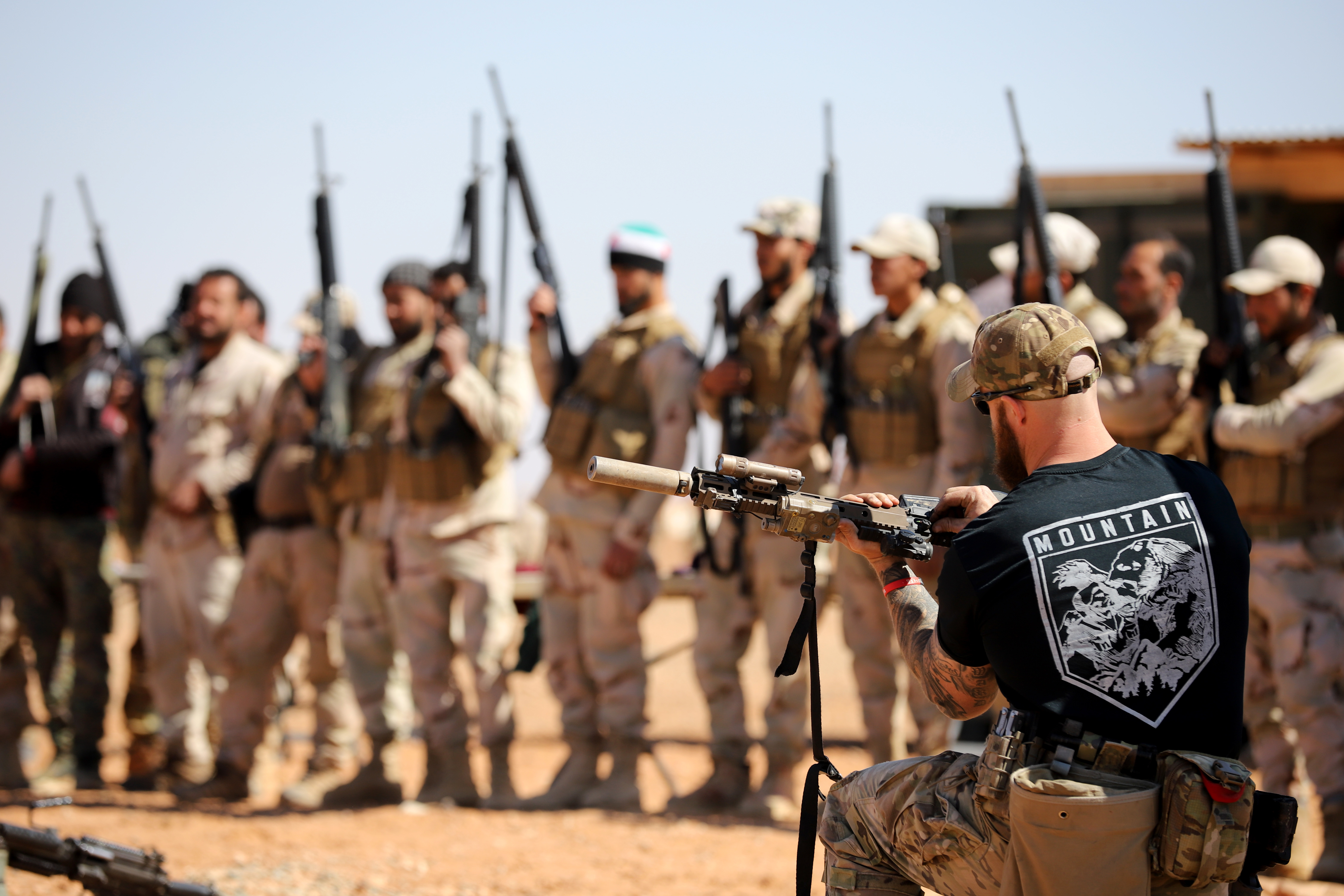
A U.S. Green Beret demonstrates how to quickly fix a firearm malfunction to Revolutionary Commando Army fighters at al-Tanf garrison, 13 March 2020

At the direction of President Obama, the U.S. Central Intelligence Agency played an active role since the early stages of the Syrian Civil War. The U.S. initially supplied the vetted militias of the Free Syrian Army with non-lethal aid but soon escalated to providing training, money, and intelligence to the rebel commanders. In June 2014, Obama requested Congressional authorization of $500 million to train, arm and support vetted Free Syrian militias as a counter-force against both Assad regime and IS.

On 17 September 2014, the House of Representatives voted to authorize the proposal to train and arm pro-Western Free Syrian militias, with the objective of training 5,000–10,000 troops. Syrian opposition's National Revolutionary Coalition welcomed Obama's announcement of extending the anti-IS bombing campaign into Syria, stating:

"The Syrian Coalition ... stands ready and willing to partner with the international community not only to defeat ISIS but also rid the Syrian people of the tyranny of the Assad regime"

The United Kingdom announced in March 2015 that it would send 75 military personnel to help train Western-vetted Free Syrian militias in the use of small arms, infantry tactics and basic medical skills. The training was supposed to take place in Turkey as part of the U.S.-led effort.

According to the United States Department of Defense, Saudi Arabia proposed that they could provide training to Syrian rebels so they could return to Syria and battle ISIL. The effort to train a large force of Syrian rebels from anti-Assad factions to fight ISIL ultimately failed, with only 54 fighters in Division 30 trained and many captured, killed or not fighting.

==== Multi-national airstrikes ====
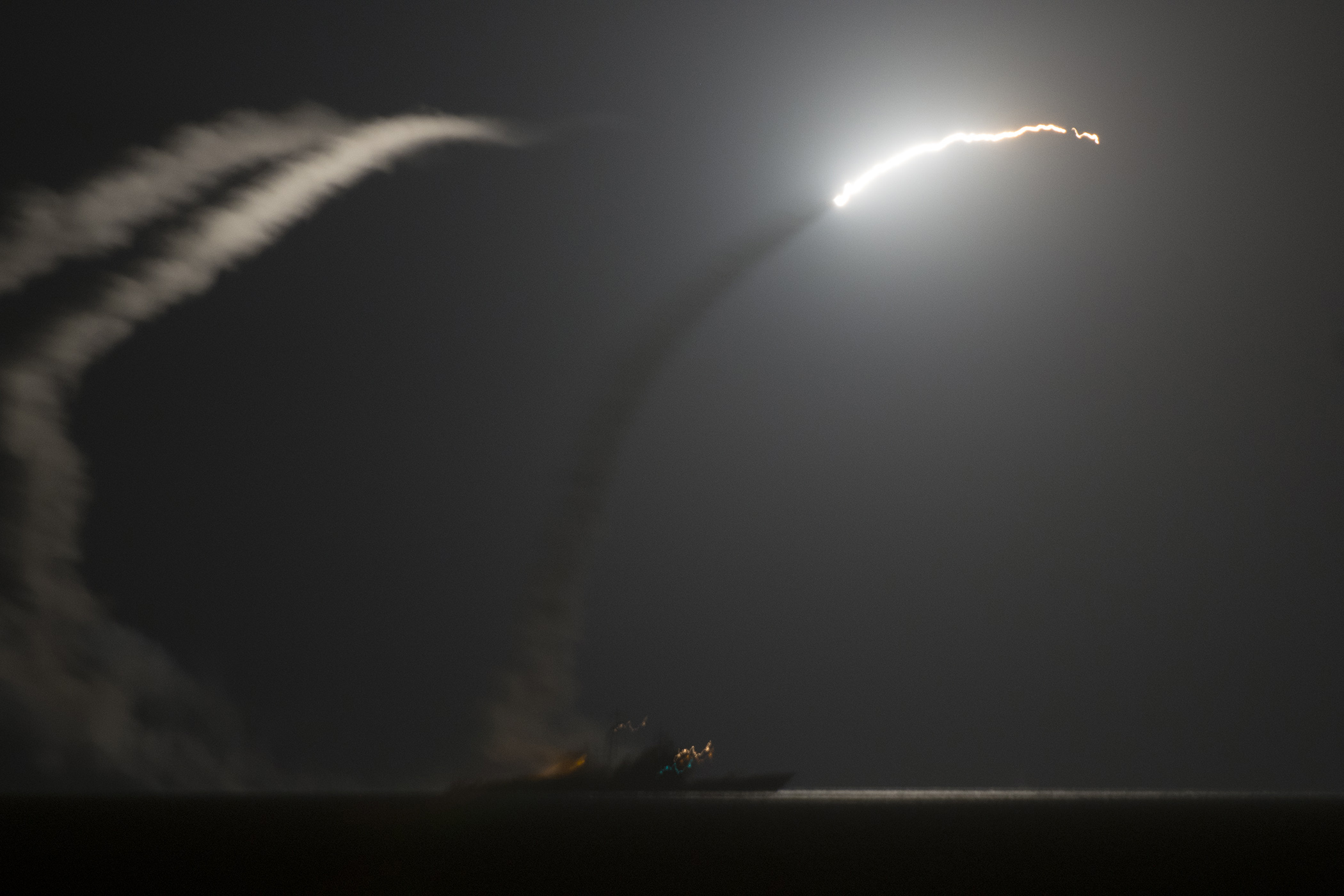
U.S. Navy launching Tomahawk missiles from the Persian Gulf and the Red Sea against ISIL targets in Syria, 23 September 2014

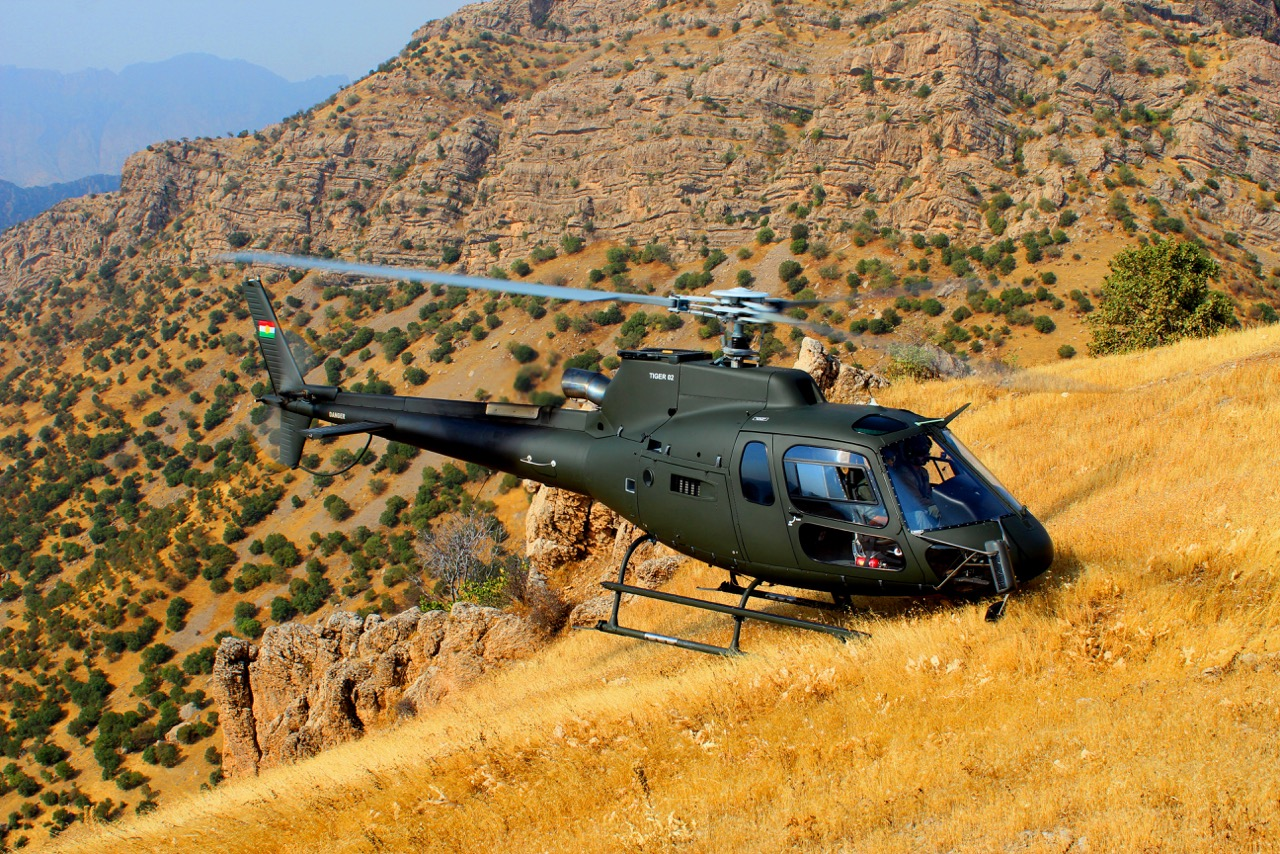
Peshmerga helicopter near the besieged city of Sinjar

U.S. President Barack Obama announced on 10 September 2014 that he would begin to extend aerial campaign to Syria with or without congressional approval. Many Senators were opposed to Obama's policy of unilateral intervention, without requesting a congressional mandate. While Obama acknowledged the broad consensus in the US intelligence community that IS were not a "current threat" to United States, he claimed that IS posed a future danger to the US, citing the anti-American rhetoric of IS leadership. Pentagon leadership preferred a greater involvement of US boots to combat IS, but this was rejected by Obama, who instead favoured working with Iraqi Ground forces, Peshmerga and Syrian opposition militias.

Starting on 22 September 2014, the U.S., Bahrain, Jordan, Qatar, Saudi Arabia, and the United Arab Emirates began numerous large-scale airstrikes against ISIL targets in Syria with fighters, bombers, and sea-based Tomahawk cruise missiles. The strikes were the largest aerial bombing operations launched against IS targets since US launched its military campaign against IS in August 2014.

Hadi al-Bahra, President of the National Coalition of Syrian Revolutionary and Opposition Forces, stated that the strikes were "necessary" to aid the Syrian people's fight against ISIL and urged the Coalition Forces to steer clear of civilian casualties. United States has ruled out any co-operation with Bashar al-Assad in the fight against IS, instead issuing warnings to the Syrian military to disengage from Coalition aircraft. State Department spokesperson Jen Psaki stated that no notifications had been issued to Assad regime with regard to US operations in Syrian airspace.

Additionally, on the first night, the U.S. forces also launched eight cruise missile strikes against the al-Qaeda-affiliated Khorasan. Many airstrikes were focused against IS command & control facilities, training camps, supply depots, military facilities, etc. in and around Raqqa. Strikes continue to take place in Syria daily. In early November early December 2014, the U.S. launched additional airstrikes against the same group. In November 2014, Morocco sent 3 F-16s to be deployed in UAE, to fight ISIL in Iraq and Syria under U.S.-led operations.

On 24 December 2014, ISIL shot down a Jordanian fighter jet over Syria and captured its pilot, Jordanian air force lieutenant Muath Al-Kasasbeh. Al-Kasabeh was offered in exchange for captured ISIL fighters. Jordan offered to make the exchange, but demanded "proof of life" first. However, Al-Kasabeh had already been executed by immolation. When video of the pilot's execution was released, a moratorium on executions in Jordan was lifted and the Al-Qaida operatives, Sajida al-Rishawi and Ziad al-Karbouli were executed.

On 21 August 2015, three ISIL fighters, two with UK nationality, were targeted and killed in Raqqa, Syria by a British Royal Air Force MQ-9 Reaper strike. Prime Minister David Cameron gave a statement to Parliament that one of the British nationals targeted had been plotting attacks in the United Kingdom. Another British national was killed in a separate air strike by US forces in Raqqa on 24 August.

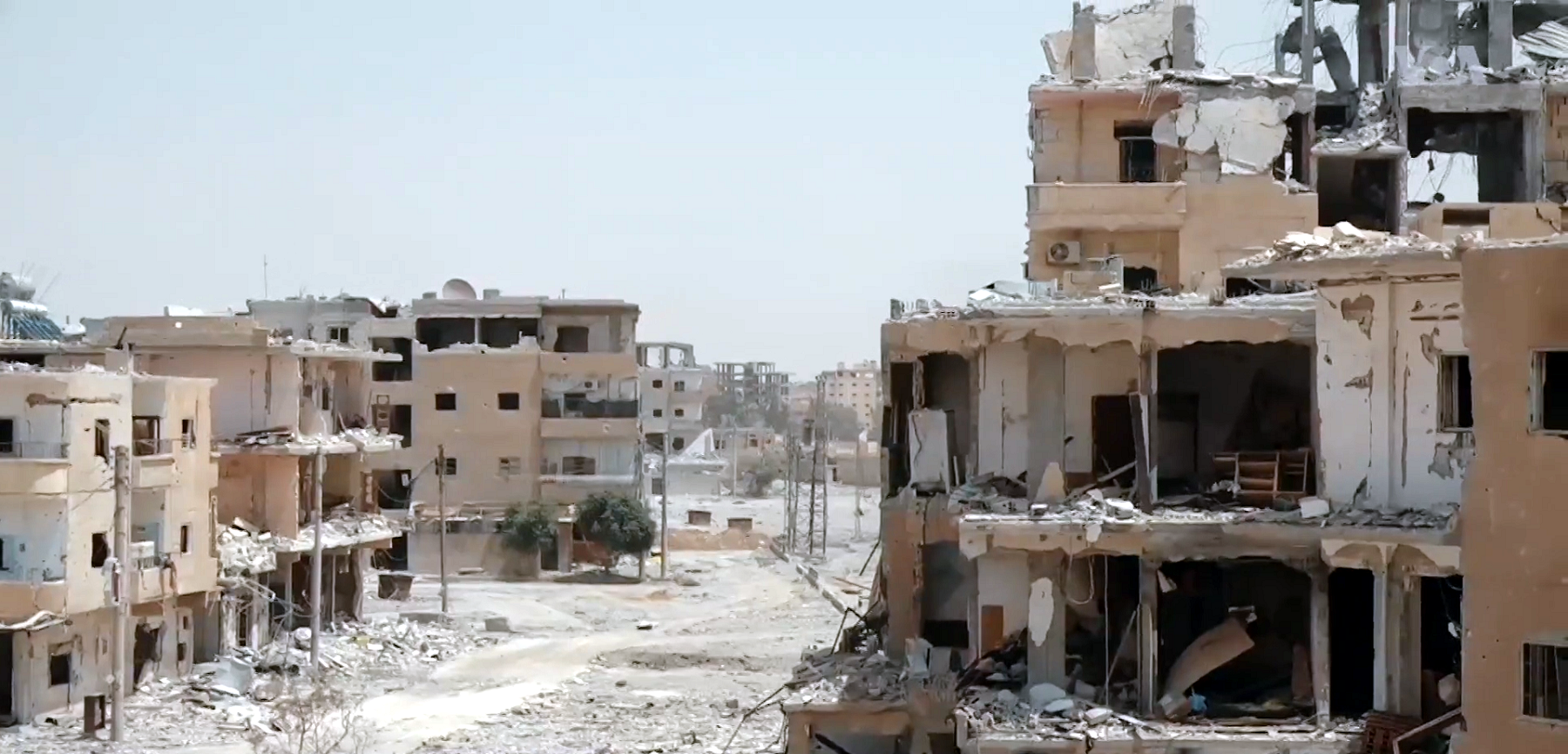
Raqqa suffered extensive damage during the Battle of Raqqa

In October and November 2015, the U.S. intensified its airstrikes on ISIL-held oil facilities in an operation named "Tidal Wave II", after the World War II campaign against Axis oil targets in Romania. The U.S. strategy aimed "to knock out specific installations for six months to a year" by focusing on facilities near Deir el-Zour. The Omar oil field, which produced 30,000 barrels of oil per day and $1.7 million to $5.1 million in revenue per month at full capacity, was hit on 21 October, reducing it to roughly a third of its capacity. French aircraft also participated in the strikes.

On 16 November 2015, a U.S. Operation Tidal Wave II sortie destroyed 116 ISIL fuel tankers clustered near Abu Kamal, a city on the Syrian border with Iraq. Four A-10 Thunderbolt IIs and two AC-130 Spectre gunships participated in the raid. Before attacking the trucks the planes conducted several low-level, 'show of force' passes.

On 2 December 2015, the Parliament of the United Kingdom voted in favour (397 to 223) to authorise air strikes in Syria. Within hours, RAF Tornado jets carried out their first air strikes, targeting the Omar oil fields in eastern Syria, which were under ISIL control. Tornado GR-4 jets were used for surveillance and a further six Typhoons left RAF Lossiemouth, Scotland to join forces at RAF Akrotiri, Cyprus.

On 4 December 2015 Germany intervened in reaction to the November 2015 Paris attacks by sending the frigate Augsburg (F213) and Panavia Tornado reconnaissance aircraft to the region. The Augsburg concluded its first deployment in March 2016, redeploying in September and concluding its mission on 14 November 2016.

On 29 January 2016, the Netherlands announced its intent on expanding its airstrike operations to Syria.

In June 2016, Omar Mateen, the attacker from the Pulse nightclub shooting pledged allegiance to the Islamic State and gave U.S. collaboration with Russia in airstrikes against I.S. as a reason for the attack.

=== Russian intervention ===
Russian Tu-95MS fires Kh-101 cruise missiles at ISIL targets in Syria, September 2017

On 11 September 2015, a Syrian military source made mention of Russian troops present in Syria to help the Syrian government in its fight against ISIL, as part of Operation Rescue. On 17 September, Syrian warplanes carried out a wave of airstrikes in the ISIL-held city of Raqqa with Russian weapons supplied by Russian Armed Forces. On 20 November, Russia claimed to have killed over 600 terrorists using cruise missiles in one mission.

=== Turkish intervention ===
ISIL is suspected of involvement in or responsibility for terrorist attacks in Turkey in May 2013 in Reyhanlı and March 2014 on Turkish police, kidnapping 49 Turkish diplomats in June 2014, the 5 June 2015 Diyarbakır rally bombing and 20 July 2015 Suruç bombing which killed 32 young activists. Until July 2015, the Turkish government attacked ISIL only once, in January 2014. In September 2014 Turkey joined a US-led coalition 'to fight ISIL'.

==== July 2015 special forces operation ====
On 23 July 2015, according to various Turkish news outlets, 60 elite Special Forces (ÖKK) operatives reportedly infiltrated Elbeyli-Ayyase village, 9 kilometers from the Syria-Turkey border in Syria, and took it back from ISIL militants. Turkish tanks shelled the village the same day of the ground operation. The operation reportedly lasted over an hour and killed over 100 ISIL militants, according to reports. The Turkish General Staff neither confirmed nor denied the special forces foray but did confirm shelling the village.

The same day, Turkey allowed the United States to use İncirlik and Diyarbakır air bases in southern Turkey for airstrikes on ISIL in Syria, and after an alleged ISIL attack on a Turkish border outpost in Kilis Province killing one Turkish soldier, the Turkish army shelled ISIL militants in Syria, killing one militant and destroying several ISIL vehicles.

On 24 July, an anonymous report appeared on a Turkish newspaper website stating that the United States had agreed with Turkey on a 'partial no-fly zone' in northern Syria.

On 24 and 25 July the Turkish Air Force launched a military operation entitled 'Operation Martyr Yalçın' against both ISIL in Syria and the Kurdistan Workers' Party (PKK) in Iraq, deploying at least 70 F-16 fighter jets.

=== Iranian intervention ===
As the conflict intensified after the rise of IS in 2014 and the subsequent deterioration of the regime's control, Iran dramatically escalated its involvement. By mid-2014, Iran began dispatching members of its elite Islamic Revolutionary Guard Corps (IRGC), including its Quds Force, along with other Iranian armed-forces personnel. At the same time, Iran organized, trained and deployed a wide array of Shiite militias: foreign volunteers, Iraqi militias that Tehran already supported, and locally raised Syrian pro-regime militias.

At the height of its intervention from 2015-2018, estimates suggest that Iran had placed as many as 10,000 IRGC personnel and a substantial number of Iranian-led foreign militias on the ground in Syria. Iranian forces backed by drones, ballistic-missiles, and air-power carried out hundreds of strikes against IS targets. By October 2018, Iranian drones alone had reportedly launched more than 700 strikes on Islamic State forces.

By 2025 more than 2,100 Iranian soldiers had been killed in Syria. The collapse of the regime's stability in late 2024 then significantly undermined Iran's influence in Syria.

=== Kurdish-led war ===
Democratic Autonomous Administration of North and East Syria is a major theater in the war against the Islamic State in Syria. During the Syrian Civil War, Kurdish forces led by the People's Protection Units (YPG) took control of Northern Syria and launched campaigns to take control of the Islamist-controlled areas. The Syrian Democratic Forces went on to take substantial territory from the Islamic State and played a major role in the liberation of Raqqa and the battle for Deir Ezzor, ending Islamic State rule in Syria.

=== Hezbollah intervention ===
The Lebanese Shiite militia and political-military group Hezbollah intervened in Syria early in the civil war, initially as military advisers and fighters sent to support the regime of Assad, but over time their role grew both in scale and strategic importance. Starting around 2012-2013, Hezbollah began deploying operatives to Syria, initially to assist in key regions like Homs, the Qusayr area, and around Damascus; including to defend Shi'a holy sites and minority communities.

Hezbollah's involvement was not only military: it helped organize, train, and lead many of the pro-regime militias later subsumed under broader entities like the National Defence Forces (NDF).

Hezbollah's intervention in Syria effectively ended with the fall of the Assad regime in December 2024. The group withdrew its fighters, and clashes began between the new Syrian transitional government and Hezbollah along the Lebanese-Syrian border.

== Lebanon ==
In 2014, during the Syrian Civil War, Lebanon clashed against ISIL and other Jihadist insurgents present in the north of the country near the border with Syria. In June 2015, Hezbollah leader Hassan Nasrallah claimed that ISIL and Nusra had taken a foothold in Lebanon and that fierce battles were raging between them and Hezbollah, as well as each other.

== Egypt ==
The Sinai insurgency began during the height of the 2011 Egyptian revolution when Egyptian President Hosni Mubarak was overthrown and a jihadist group called the Ansar Bait al-Maqdis (ABM) launched attacks against Egyptian security forces and civilians in the Sinai. Sometimes, the group conducted cross-border attacks against Israel as well. After another Egyptian president, President Mohamed Morsi, was overthrown in 2013, the ABM intensified its attacks against the Egyptian forces and governmental figures.

=== 2014 Islamic State rebranding ===
In November 2014, the ABM swore allegiance to the Islamic State and its then-leader, Abu Bakr al-Baghdadi. After making the commitment, the group changed its name to Islamic State – Sinai Province (IS-SP) and gained recognition as an affiliate of the ISIS, thus Egypt's involvement against the Islamic State became explicit. In 2015, the United States increased military aid to Egypt after lifting its suspension due to the 2013 coup. This included help with counterterrorism, sharing intelligence, and providing military equipment to fight Sinai-linked militants. Israel also permitted Egypt to exceed the quantity of troops and heavy equipment Egypt could deploy in the Sinai than allowed under the 1979 Egypt–Israel peace treaty. Israel also shared reconnaissance intelligence and sometimes performed airstrikes in the Sinai with Egyptian permission.

=== Sinai operations and clashes ===
During this period, the Egyptian Armed Forces significantly expanded its operations by demolishing suspected terrorist-controlled buildings and underground smuggling caves connecting Egypt and Gaza, establishing buffer zones near the borders of Gaza, implementing strict curfews in the Sinai, and turning to the scorched earth strategy. However, the Egyptian Security Forces were subsequently accused of war crimes, mainly by Human Rights Watch (HRW), due to excessive force causing civilian casualties and widespread displacement.

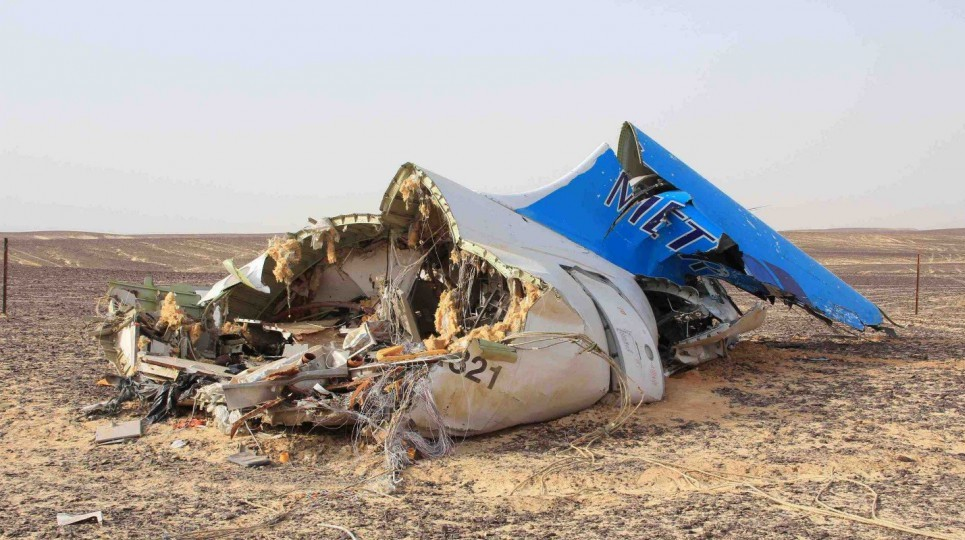
The aftermath of Metrojet Flight 9268

Multiple intense clashes occurred, mainly in January and July 2015, which resulted in heavy losses on both sides. On 7 September 2015, Egypt launched Operation Martyr's Right, a six-phased long-term campaign aiming to "rooting out and killing 'terrorists'". By late September 2015, during the second phase of the operation, the Egyptian military had impounded multiple weapons, ammunitions, vehicles, and communicating devices, with 535 militants dead with another 578 arrested. Following clashes in early 2015, Metrojet Flight 9268, a Russian airliner flight flying from Egypt to Russia with 224 people on board, disintegrated somewhere over northern Sinai by a bomb planted by the IS-SP, killing everyone on board.

The insurgency had reached a deadlock by 2016 and 2017, with ongoing fighting leading to heavy casualties on both sides but no clear winner. While Egyptian forces controlled major towns and carried out operations to contain the militants, the militants maintained a stronghold in rural and desert areas, although some progress was made in the continued destruction of the underground smuggling tunnels between Egypt and Gaza, increased enforcement of established buffer zones near the Egypt–Gaza border, and increased inspection of vehicles crossing the Egypt–Libya border. On 24 November 2017, a large group of the IS-SP militants coordinated an attack on a mosque in northern Sinai, killing 311 people and injuring 128 more. It is the deadliest terrorist attack in Egypt until today. Current Egyptian President Abdel Fattah el-Sisi vowed for revenge and gave the Egyptian military a three-month deadline to launch an operation to stabilise the Sinai.

On 9 February 2018, three months after the 2017 Sinai Mosque attack, one of the largest Egyptian operations in this conflict was launched by the Egyptian Armed Forces. Particularly in northern Sinai, the Egyptian National Police and the Egyptian Military forces conducted multiple raids in buildings and intensified in the continued-demolition of buildings as well. Multiple airstikes were also performed. The Egyptian Navy also continued to secure the northern coast of the Sinai. A reported 464 militants were killed along with 7491 others being arrested.

In 2023, with the loss of around 3000 military men and with more than 12,000 injured, Egyptian President Abdel Fattah el-Sisi declared victory over the militants. The high-level attacks conducted by the IS-SP were categorised as low-level attacks due to the significant military presence and continued military operations against the militants.

=== Direct international involvement ===
Egypt's first direct major international involvement against the Islamic State was in Libya when, on 15 February 2015, Islamic State militants executed 21 Coptic Christians, 20 of which were Egyptians. In retaliation, Egypt launched airstrikes against ISIS positions in Libya the next day using F-16s, which effectively associated Egypt in the Second Libyan Civil War. The airstrikes had killed more than 60 ISIS militants and some civilians.

== Iraq ==
=== US-led intervention ===
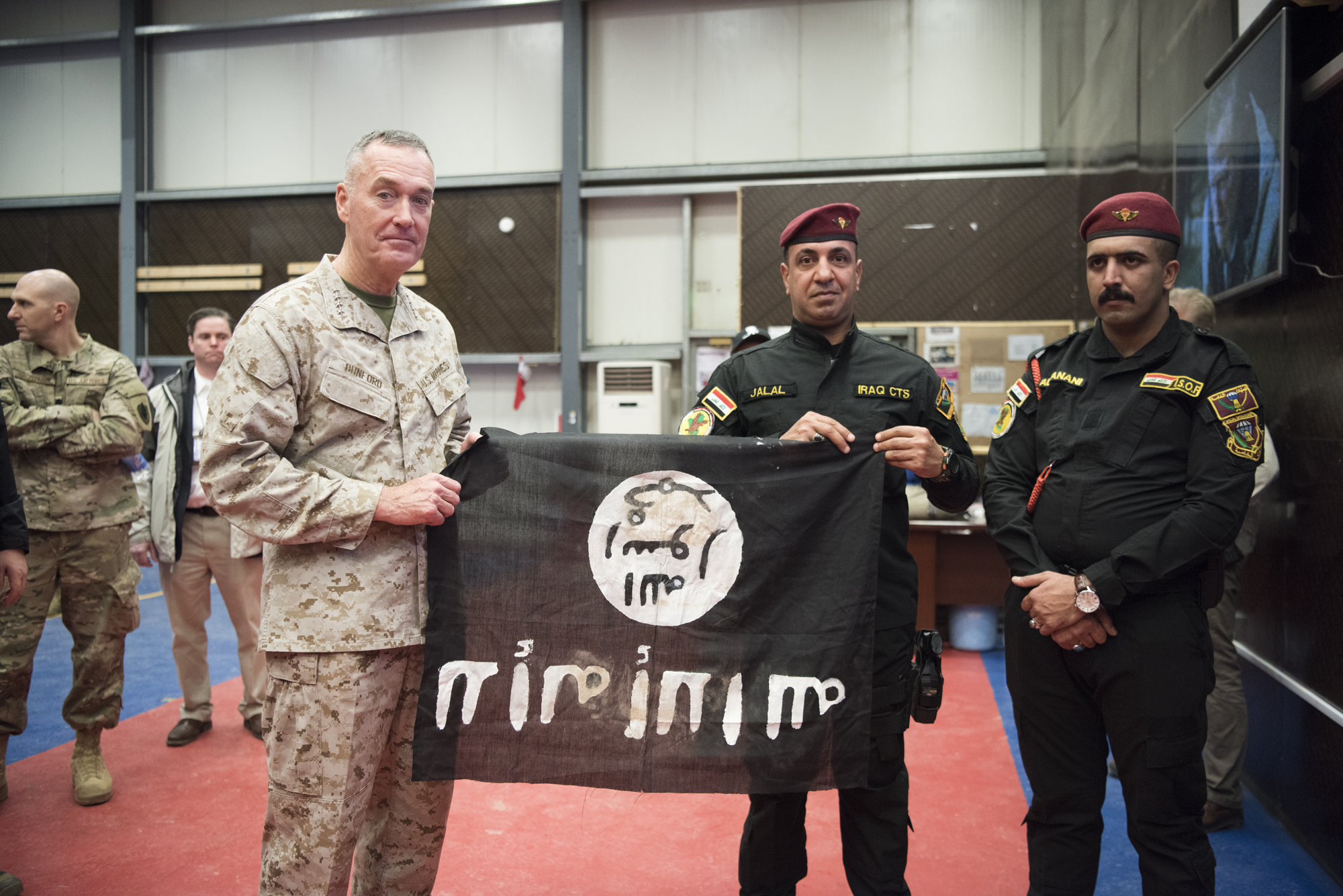
Iraqi soldiers present US Marine General Joseph Dunford with a captured ISIL flag during the intervention.

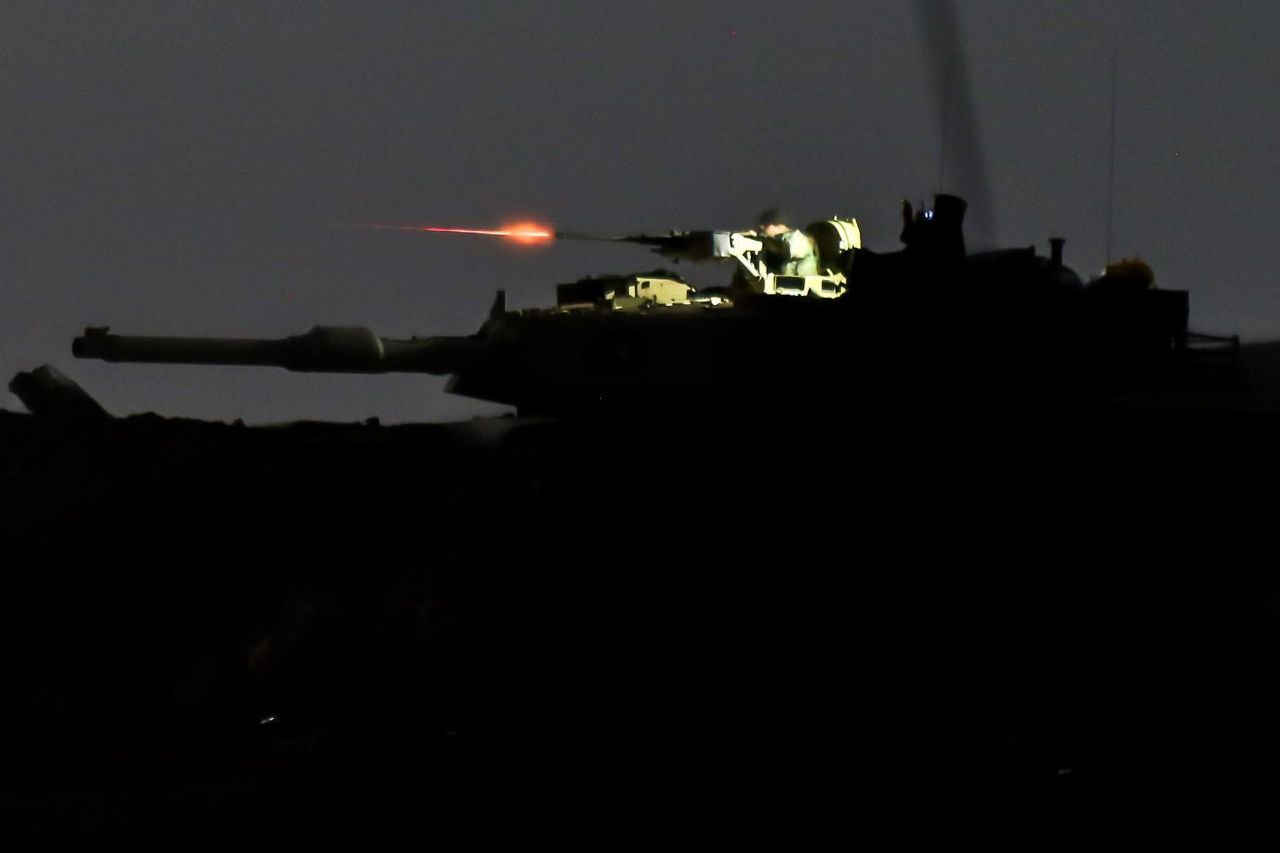
A 9th Iraqi army member, supported by Combined Joint Task Force-Operation Inherent Resolve, fires a machine gun from an M1 Abrams tank, during a battle with ISIS fighters near Al Tarab, Iraq, March 12, 2017.

After having started flying crewed aircraft over Iraq and sending some troops in June, in August 2014 the US military began supplying Iraqi Kurdish Peshmerga with weapons, dropping food for refugees fleeing from ISIL, and airstrikes against ISIL in Iraq.

On 9 August, speaking about U.S. airstrikes in Iraq, President Barack Obama said "this is going to be a long-term project." Since then, nine countries allied with the US have also executed airstrikes on ISIL in Iraq, and various countries have contributed military and humanitarian aid to Iraqi government and Iraqi Kurdish ground forces.

On 16–19 August, according to the U.S., Iraqi government forces and Kurdish Peshmerga, with the help of U.S. airstrikes, took back the Mosul Dam, the largest dam in Iraq. (For further wins and losses in Iraq against ISIL, see War in Iraq (2014–2017)). President Obama announced on 10 September 2014 that the number of airstrikes in Iraq would increase and that he had dispatched 500 more US troops there.

On 10 September 2019, US Air Force F-35s and F-15E Strike Eagles dropped bombs weighing 36,000 kg on an Iraqi island "infested" by ISIS.

==== Military aid ====
On 5 August 2014, Zalmay Khalilzad, the former US ambassador to Iraq and the UN, wrote in the Washington Post that the United States is involved in "the direct supply of munitions to the Kurds and, with Baghdad's agreement, the shipment of some Foreign Military Sales (FMS) program weapons to the Kurds." The United States moved from indirectly supplying Kurdistan with small arms through the CIA to directly giving them weapons such as man-portable anti-tank systems.

In a coordinated effort led by the United States, many allied countries including NATO members and Middle Eastern partners have supplied or plan to supply Iraqi and/or Kurdish forces with heavy military equipment, small arms, ammunition, non-lethal military gear, and training support.

The Building Partner Capacity (BPC) program is meant to help the Iraqi government to prepare forces for the counter-attack against ISIL and the regaining of its territory. According to the US Department of Defense, by May 2015 a dozen countries had committed themselves to the BPC program: Australia, Belgium, Canada, Denmark, France, Germany, Italy, Netherlands, New Zealand, Norway, Spain, United Kingdom and United States, and 6,500 Iraqi forces had been trained by BPC.

==== Humanitarian efforts ====
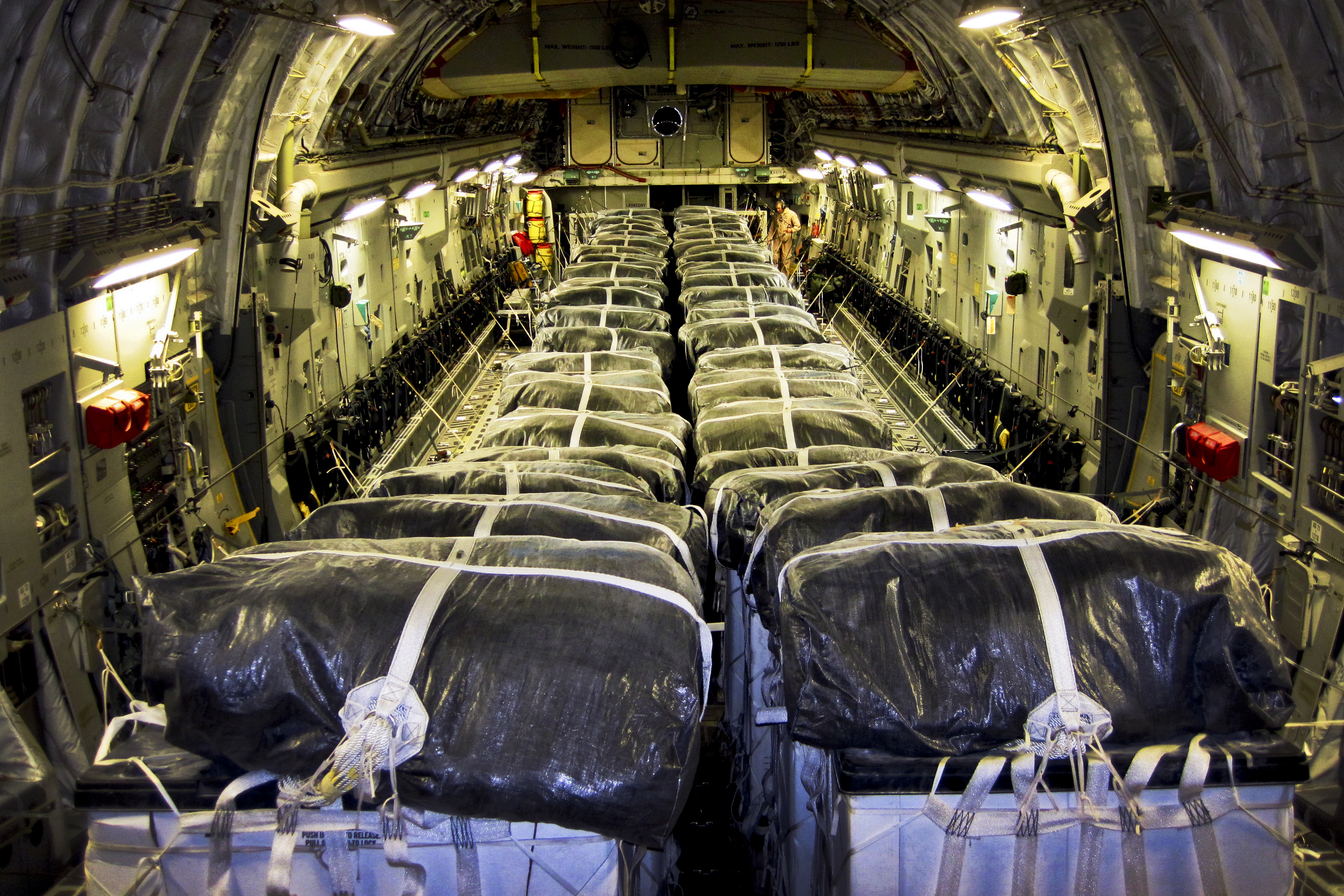
Bottled water containers are loaded on a U.S. Air Force C-17 for an airdrop on 8 August 2014.

The United States, the United Kingdom, and Australia, supported by international partners, launched a large humanitarian effort to support refugees stranded in northern Iraq. This included air-dropping tens of thousands of meals and thousands of gallons of drinking water to Yazidi refugees stranded in the Sinjar Mountains and threatened by advancing ISIL forces, between 7–14 August 2014, in what was later described as "the first mass air delivery of humanitarian cargo since the outbreak of violence in East Timor in 1999."

Thousands of Yazidis and other Iraqi civilians fled to the area following attacks on their villages and the town of Sinjar throughout late July and early August 2014.

Several human rights and observer organizations in the region reported that those who fled to the mountains were subjected to starvation, and lacked clean drinking water and medical care for several months as ISIL militants surrounded them. Hundreds of men, women, and children were abducted and killed.

In response to the immediate threat to the approximately 30,000 people trapped on the mountain, coalition aircraft commenced humanitarian aid drops. These air drops included basic supplies such as food, water, and shelter and were conducted at low flight levels by coalition transport aircraft under the threat of ISIL surface-to-air attacks.

In direct support of humanitarian aid drops, CF-18s provided top cover for a Royal Australian Air Force (RAAF) C-130 Hercules transport aircraft on 20 November, ensuring the transport crew was able to safely parachute supplies to waiting refugees below. Canadian fighter jets remained in close proximity to the transport aircraft to protect it from ISIL surface-to-air threats or attacks.

==== U.S. military operations ====
President Obama speaks about the "game plan" for dealing with the Islamic State.

Unlike their coalition partners, and unlike previous American combat operations, no name was initially given to the 2014 intervention against ISIL by the U.S. government. The decision to keep the conflict nameless drew considerable media criticism. U.S. Service members remain ineligible for Campaign Medals and other service decorations due to the continuing ambiguous nature of the continuing U.S. involvement in Iraq.

On 15 October 2014, the United States Central Command announced that the U.S.-led air campaign against ISIL in Iraq and Syria was henceforth designated as Operation Inherent Resolve. The CENTCOM news release noted:

"According to CENTCOM officials, the name INHERENT RESOLVE is intended to reflect the unwavering resolve and deep commitment of the U.S. and partner nations in the region and around the globe to eliminate the terrorist group ISIL and the threat they pose to Iraq, the region and the wider international community. It also symbolizes the willingness and dedication of coalition members to work closely with our friends in the region and apply all available dimensions of national power necessary—diplomatic, informational, military, economic—to degrade and ultimately destroy ISIL."

===== U.S. airstrikes =====
U.S. Navy Boeing F/A-18F Super Hornet bomb ISIL artillery targets on 8 August 2014.

In June 2014, U.S. forces had started undertaking reconnaissance missions over northern Iraq.

On 7 August, President Obama gave a live address describing the worsening conditions in Iraq and that the plight of the Yazidis particular had convinced him that U.S. military action was necessary to protect American lives, protect minority groups in Iraq, and to stop a possible ISIL advance on Erbil, the capital of the Kurdish Autonomous Region. On 8 August, the United States started to bomb ISIL targets in Iraq. By 10 August, assisted by these air attacks, Kurdish forces claimed to have recaptured the towns of Mahmour and Gweyr from Islamic State control. Additional Iraqi airstrikes conducted in Sinjar were reported to have killed 45 ISIL militants and injured an additional 60 militants. On 11 August, a spokesperson for The Pentagon said the airstrikes had slowed down ISIL's advance in northern Iraq, but were unlikely to degrade ISIL's capabilities or operations in other areas. Between 8 and 13 August, U.S. airstrikes and Kurdish ground forces enabled 35,000 to 45,000 of Yazidi refugees to escape or be evacuated from the Sinjar Mountains.

On 16 August, U.S. air power began a close air campaign aimed at supporting the advance of Kurdish fighters moving toward the Mosul Dam. Kurdish sources commented that it was the "heaviest US bombing of militant positions since the start of air strikes". President Obama on 17 August defended this usage of U.S. Forces as support of the Iraqi and Kurdish fight in general against ISIL—which indeed went beyond Obama's reasoning for launching airstrikes on 7 August.

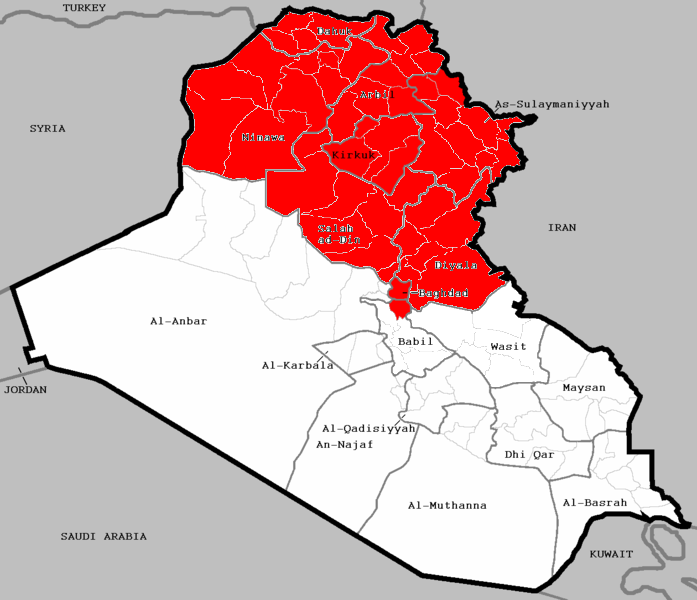
Locations where the United States has launched airstrikes against ISIS in Iraq (as of 16 September 2014).

On 8 September, the Iraqi Army, with close air support from the U.S., retook the key Haditha Dam, and recaptured the town of Barwanah, killing 15 ISIL fighters. ISIL responded with the public execution of David Haines. By the end of September 2014, the United States had conducted 240 airstrikes in Iraq and Syria, as well as 1,300 tanker refueling missions, totaling 3,800 sorties by all types of aircraft. A tactical arrangement with Kurdish and Iraqi forces, and drone videos are being used to coordinate close air support without needing U.S. troops in ground combat.

On 19 December 2014, US General James Terry announced that the number of US airstrikes on ISIL had increased to 1,361.

On 25 December 2014, Hassan Saeed Al-Jabouri, the ISIL governor of Mosul, who was also known as Abu Taluut, was killed by a US-led Coalition airstrike in Mosul. It was also reported that the US planned to retake the city of Mosul in January 2015.

On 15 January 2015, it was reported that over 16,000 airstrikes had been carried out by the Coalition. The U.S. Air Force has carried out around 60 percent of all strikes. Among them, F-16s performed 41 percent of all sorties, followed by the F-15E at 37 percent, then the A-10 at 11 percent, the B-1 bomber at eight percent, and the F-22 at 3 percent. The remaining 40 percent has been carried out by the US Navy and allied nations.

On 20 January 2015, the SOHR reported that al-Baghdadi, the leader of ISIL, had been wounded in an airstrike in Al-Qa'im, an Iraqi border town held by ISIL, and as a result, withdrew to Syria.

On 21 January 2015, the US began coordinating airstrikes with a Kurdish launched offensive, to help them begin the planned operation to retake the city of Mosul.

On 21 July 2015, it was reported that nearly 44,000 sorties have flown since August 2014.

Throughout 2015, the vast majority of bombs and missiles launched by the US (approximately 22,000 of 23,000 total) were directed at targets in Iraq and Syria, according to the Council on Foreign Relations.

In 2016, the Pulse nightclub shooting was carried out in retaliation for the U.S. Airstrikes in Iraq and Syria.

In 2019 U.S military carried out an airstrike in Baghuz town in Syria leading to death of 64 women and children, marking the largest civilian casualty incidents of the war against the Islamic State. The incident was concealed by the U.S. military and it was reported by the New York Times for the first time on November 14, 2021.

In June 2020, coalition aircraft destroyed three ISIL camps in northern Iraq.

===== U.S. ground forces =====
In July, President Obama announced that due to the continuing violence in Iraq and the growing influence of non-state organizations, such as the Islamic State of Iraq and the Levant, the United States would be elevating its security commitment in the region. Approximately 800 U.S. troops secured American installations like the Embassy in Baghdad and the Consulate in Erbil as well as taking control of strategic locations like the Baghdad airport in cooperation with Iraqi troops.

U.S. forces also undertook a mission to "assess and to advise [Iraqi security forces] as they confront [ISIL] and the complex security situation on the ground." Reports from these American units about the capabilities of the Iraqi military have been consistently grim, viewing them as "compromised" by sectarian interests.

On 13 August 2014, the U.S. deployed another 130 military advisers to Northern Iraq and up to 20 U.S. Marines and special forces servicemen landed on Mount Sinjar from V-22 aircraft to coordinate the evacuation of Yazidi refugees joining British SAS already in the area.

On 3 September 2014, Obama announced increase of U.S. forces in Iraq to 1,213. On 10 September, Obama gave a speech reiterating that U.S. troops will not fight in combat, but about 500 more troops will be sent to Iraq to help train Iraqi forces.

In early November 2014, Obama announced that he would be doubling the U.S. ground presence inside Iraq to around 3,000 men. By early December 2014, the number of U.S. ground troops in Iraq had increased to 3,100.

On 9 December 2014, the United States Senate Committee on Foreign Relations authorized U.S. military force against ISIL. However, it limits military force to three years, requires the administration to report to Congress every 60 days, and prohibits the deployment of U.S. combat troops, except in specific cases, such as those involving the rescue or protection of U.S. soldiers, or for intelligence operations.

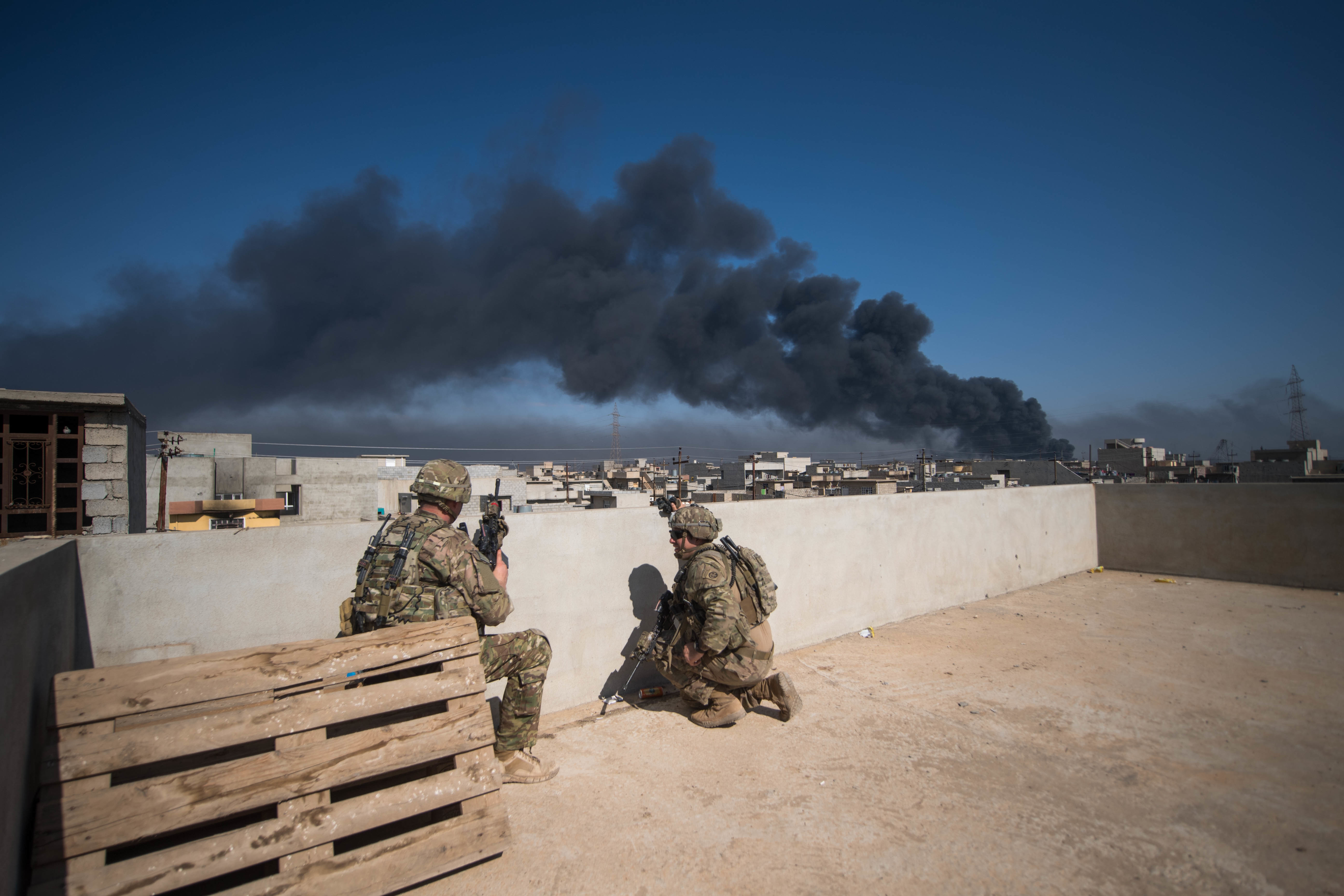
U.S. Army infantry from the 325th Infantry Regiment during the Battle of Mosul, 7 March 2017

During the early morning hours of 14 December 2014, U.S. ground forces allegedly clashed with ISIL alongside the Iraqi Army and Tribal Forces near the Ain al-Assad Airbase, west of Anbar, in an attempt to repel them from the base of which includes about 100 U.S. advisers in it, when ISIL attempted to overrun the base. According to a field commander of the Iraqi Army in Al Anbar Governorate, said that "the U.S. force equipped with light and medium weapons, supported by F-18, was able to inflict casualties against fighters of ISIL organization, and forced them to retreat from the al-Dolab area, which lies 10 kilometers from Ain al-Assad base." Sheikh Mahmud Nimrawi, a prominent tribal leader in the region, added that "U.S. forces intervened because of ISIL started to come near the base, which they are stationed in so out of self-defense," he responded, welcoming the U.S. intervention, and saying "which I hope will not be the last." This was said to be the first encounter between the United States and the Islamic State, in four years. However, this claim has been stated to be "false" by The Pentagon.

On 5 January 2015, The Pentagon acknowledged that ISIL had been ineffectively mortaring the base.

In late February 2015, another 1,300 US soldiers were deployed to Iraq, increasing the number of US ground troops in Iraq to 4,400.

On 9 March 2020, the Pentagon released a statement claiming that two American Marines were killed on 8 March 2020 during an anti-ISIS operation in a mountainous area of north central Iraq. Col. Myles B. Caggins III, a spokesman for the OIR coalition, later identified the Marines as Gunnery Sgt. Diego D. Pongo, 34, of Simi Valley, California, and Capt. Moises A. Navas, 34, of Germantown, Maryland, who were also MARSOC Raiders, and that they died during an operation which also claimed the lives of four ISIS fighters during an American-led operation which involved clearing an ISIS cave complex in the Makhmur Mountains, south of Erbil.

The coalition officially concluded its combat mission in Iraq on 9 December 2021, but U.S. troops remained in Iraq to advise, train, and assist Iraqi security forces against the ongoing ISIL insurgency, including providing air support and military aid.

==== Australian airstrikes ====
On 3 October 2014, Prime Minister Tony Abbott and the Australian Cabinet approved for RAAF Boeing F/A-18F Super Hornet fighter bombers to begin airstrikes against Islamic State militants. Abbott said "It is in our national interest that we do so, it is in the interests of civilisation that we do so. It is in everyone's best interests that the murderous rage of the ISIL death cult be checked and rolled back and that's what we're determined to do."

On 6 October, Air Chief Marshal Mark Binskin announced two Super Hornets had conducted armed combat missions over Iraq although no armaments were expended. An Australian Air task Group KC-30A and an E-7A Wedgetail Airborne Early Warning and Control aircraft have also been flying in support to fighter bombers belonging to coalition forces. The KC-30A performs airborne refueling for coalition aircraft. Binskin said "One of our Super Hornet packages on the first night ... had an identified target which it was tracking and that particular target moved into an urban area where the risks of conducting a strike on that target increased to a point where it exceeded our expectations of collateral damage, so they discontinued the attack at that point."

On 9 October, Prime Minister Tony Abbott confirmed that RAAF Super Hornets had been involved in a "strike missions on an ISIL position in Iraq". The aircraft dropped two bombs onto an isolated building which ISIL was using as a command and control center.

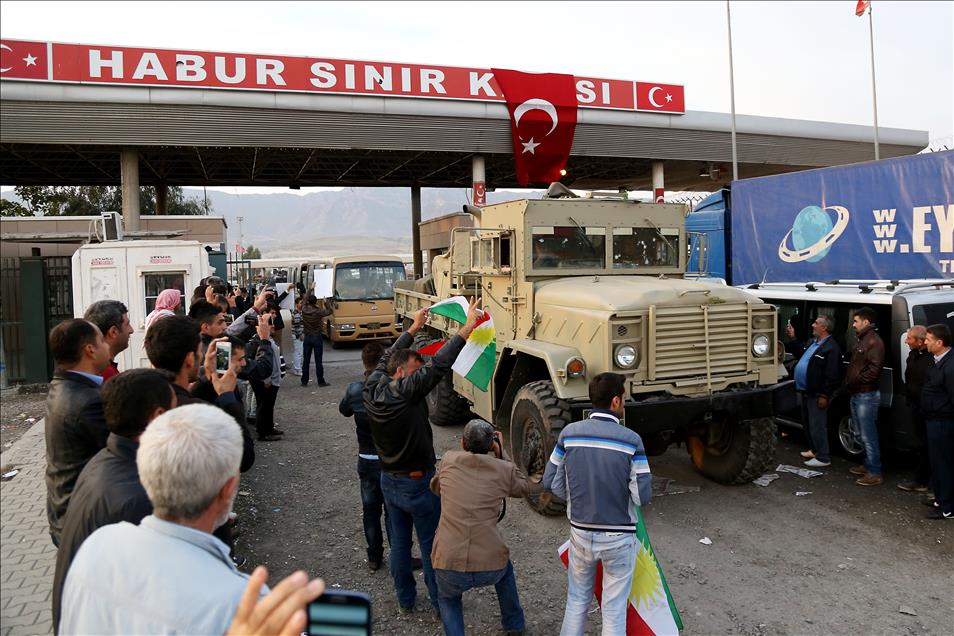
Peshmerga Fighters Enter Turkey Towards Kobanî after the Kurdistan Regional Government got Permission from Turkey.

As of 17 October, the Royal Australian Air Force had conducted 43 combat sorties over Iraq. Recent strikes had targeted equipment facilities, with "at least two" resulting in ISIL casualties after Australian aircraft had increased the number of missions flown to allow U.S. and coalition forces to assist Kurdish fighters around Kobanî, in northern Syria.

After more than 2 years of involvement in the coalition, Australia announced the end of its airstrikes in Iraq, after informing Iraq and other allies.

==== British airstrikes ====
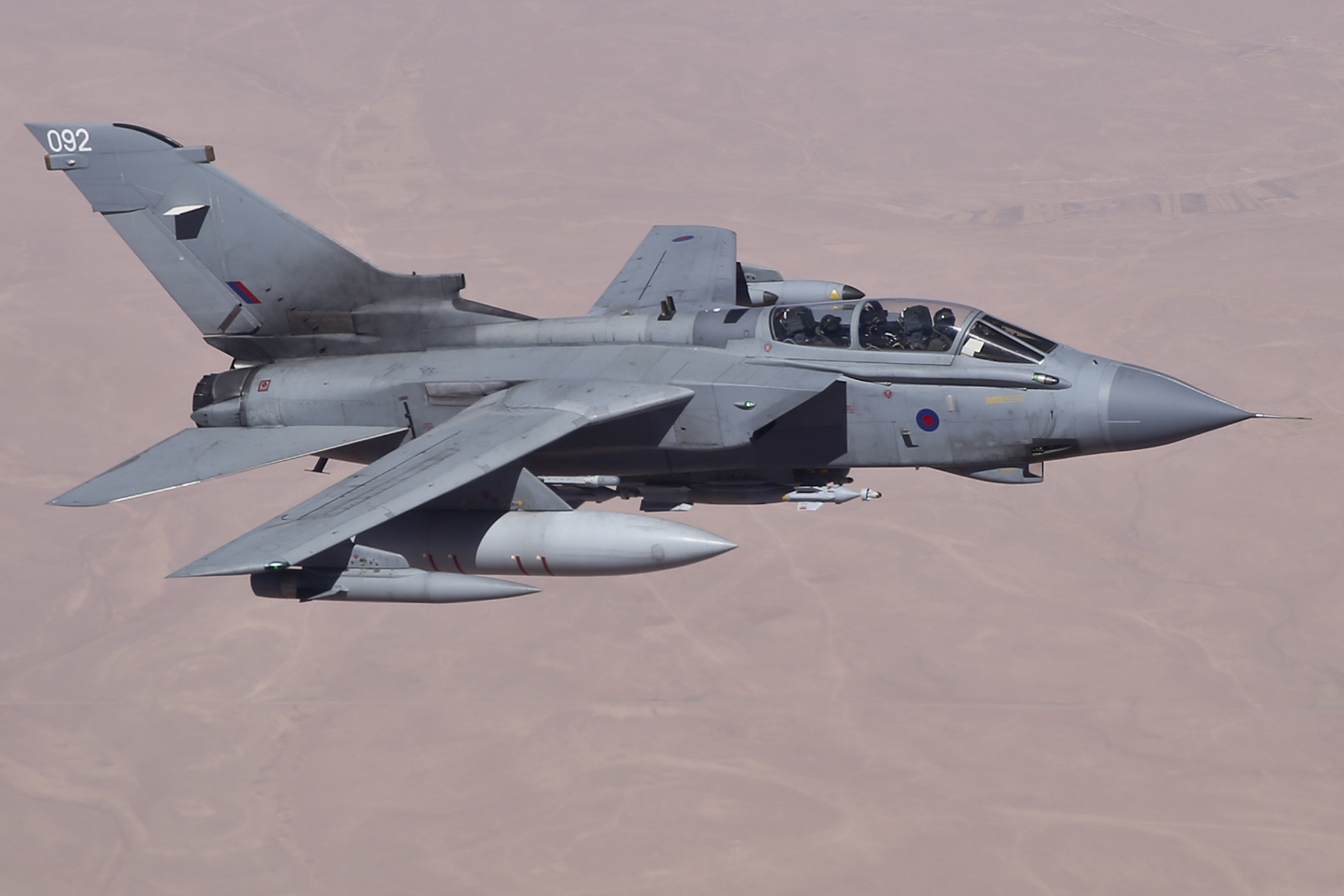
RAF Tornado GR4 over Iraq on an armed reconnaissance mission.

On 12 August 2014, the United Kingdom deployed six Tornado GR4 strike aircraft to RAF Akrotiri in Cyprus to help coordinate its humanitarian aid airdrops in Northern Iraq. On 16 August 2014, following the completion of humanitarian aid airdrops, the Tornado GR4s, along with an RC-135 Rivet Joint signals intelligence aircraft, were re-tasked to provide aerial surveillance to coalition forces.

In early September 2014, British Prime Minister David Cameron began voicing his support for British airstrikes against ISIL in Iraq. Weeks later, Parliament was recalled and Members debated whether or not to authorise airstrikes. The seven-hour debate resulted in overwhelming support for airstrikes, with 524 votes in favour and 43 votes against.

On 27 September 2014, the first armed sortie took place over Iraq. A pair of Tornado GR4s left Cyprus armed with laser-guided bombs, supported by a Voyager aerial refueling tanker. Ultimately, the aircraft did not locate any targets requiring immediate air attack and so gathered intelligence for coalition forces instead. The Royal Air Force (RAF) conducted its first airstrike on 30 September 2014. A pair of Tornado GR4s engaged an ISIL heavy weapon position and an armed pickup truck using a laser-guided bomb and air-to-surface missile.

On 3 October 2014, the RAF deployed two additional Tornado aircraft to bring its deployed fleet up to eight aircraft. During the same month, it was also confirmed that the Royal Navy was involved in anti-ISIL operations in a support role, with air defence destroyer HMS Defender providing escort to U.S. Navy aircraft carrier USS George H.W. Bush as she launched aircraft into Iraq and Syria. Nick Clegg, then Deputy Prime Minister, also disclosed during an interview that there was a nuclear attack submarine armed with Tomahawk cruise missiles deployed to the region.

On 16 October 2014, the Ministry of Defence announced it would deploy MQ-9 Reaper drones to assist with surveillance, although, Defence Secretary Michael Fallon stated that the drones could also conduct airstrikes if required. The first Reaper drone strike occurred weeks later in Bayji, north of Baghdad, against a group of ISIL militants which had been laying improvised explosive devices. As of September 2015, a year after operations first began, more than 330 ISIL fighters had been killed by British airstrikes in Iraq, without any civilian casualties.

In addition to operations over Iraq, the United Kingdom had also intervened in Syria by 21 October 2014, making it the first Western country, other than the United States, to do so. However, British aircraft were not permitted to carrying out airstrikes until Parliament had voted to give its authorization. Despite this, the Royal Air Force carried out a drone strike in Syria on 21 August 2015, against two UK-born ISIL fighters which had been plotting attacks against the United Kingdom. Prime Minister David Cameron insisted that it was a lawful act of self-defense.

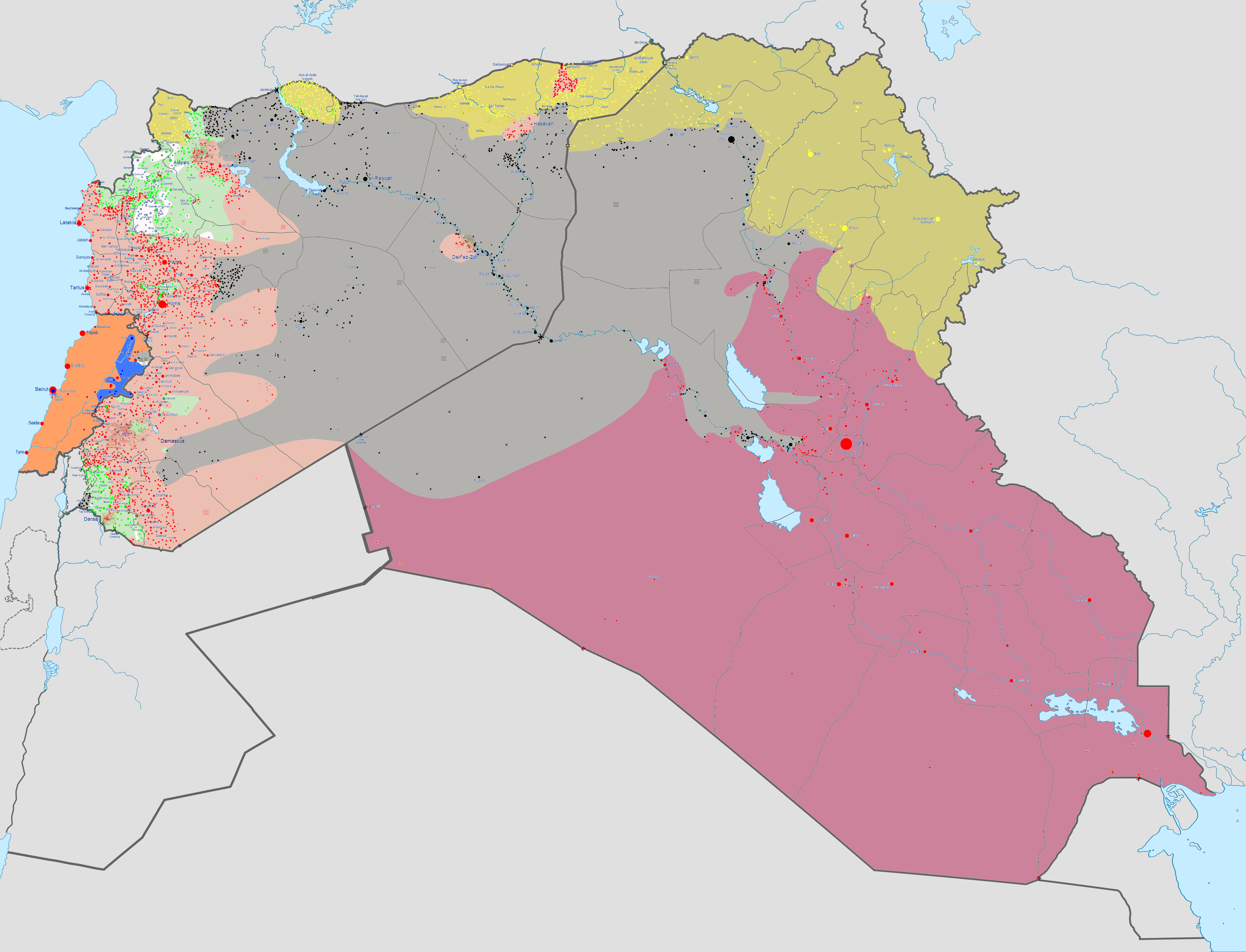
ISIL's territory, in grey, at the time of its greatest territorial extent in May 2015

Since the authorization of airstrikes in Iraq, Prime Minister David Cameron had made persistent calls for airstrikes in Syria; however, he affirmed that no airstrikes would take place until after a vote in Parliament. On 2 December 2015, following the November 2015 Paris attacks and United Nations Security Council Resolution 2249, David Cameron opened a ten-hour debate in Parliament on Syrian airstrikes, which ended with a final vote. 397 MPs voted in favour of airstrikes, whilst 223 voted against. Airstrikes commenced two hours after the vote, taking place in eastern Syria against the ISIL-held Oman oilfield. Defence Secretary Michael Fallon also subsequently announced that the UK's "strike force" based in Cyprus would double, with the addition of six Eurofighter Typhoons and two Tornado GR4s.

In addition to airstrikes, the United Kingdom has also made significant contributions towards the coalition's ISTAR capabilities. The Royal Air Force has deployed Sentinel R1, Sentry AEW1, RC-135W Rivet Joint and Shadow R1 aircraft to gather surveillance, in addition to Tornado GR4 and MQ-9 Reaper strike aircraft. In September 2015, the United Kingdom was responsible for a third of all coalition surveillance flights over Iraq and Syria, with the Tornado GR4s RAPTOR reconnaissance pod accounting for 60% of the coalition's entire tactical reconnaissance in Iraq alone.

In December 2016, the Telegraph reported that Secretary of State for Defence Sir Michael Fallon said "The British Army have trained over 31,000 Iraqi and Peshmerga who are taking the fight to Daesh" It was also reported that the Royal Air Force is operating at its most intense for 25 years in a single theatre of operation which far outstripped the UK involvement in the Iraq War and the War in Afghanistan (2001–2014), with RAF jets having dropped 11 times more bombs on Syria and Iraq in the preceding 12 months than they had in the busiest year of action in Afghanistan a decade previously.

==== Canadian airstrikes ====
Canada took part in airstrikes against ISIL from 2 November 2014 until 22 February 2016 when following the election of Justin Trudeau to Prime Minister withdrew its CF-18s fighter jets and ended all airstrikes in Syria and Iraq.

The Canadian contribution was code-named Operation Impact by the Canadian Department of National Defence. Canadian aircraft left for the Middle East to join in airstrikes on 21 October 2014. In total, six CF-18 fighter jets, an Airbus CC-150 Polaris air-to-air refueling tanker and two CP-140 Aurora surveillance aircraft were sent, along with 700 military personnel.

Canadian CF-18 fighter jets completed their first operational flights departing from Kuwait on 31 October. The first Canadian airstrikes began on 2 November. Canada also flew an extra CF-18 to Kuwait to be used as a spare if the need arises, however a maximum of six are authorized to fly with the coalition missions.

On 4 November 2014, Royal Canadian Air Force CF-18s destroyed ISIL construction equipment using GBU-12 bombs. The construction equipment was being used to divert the Euphrates River to deny villages water, and to flood roads, diverting traffic to areas with IEDs.

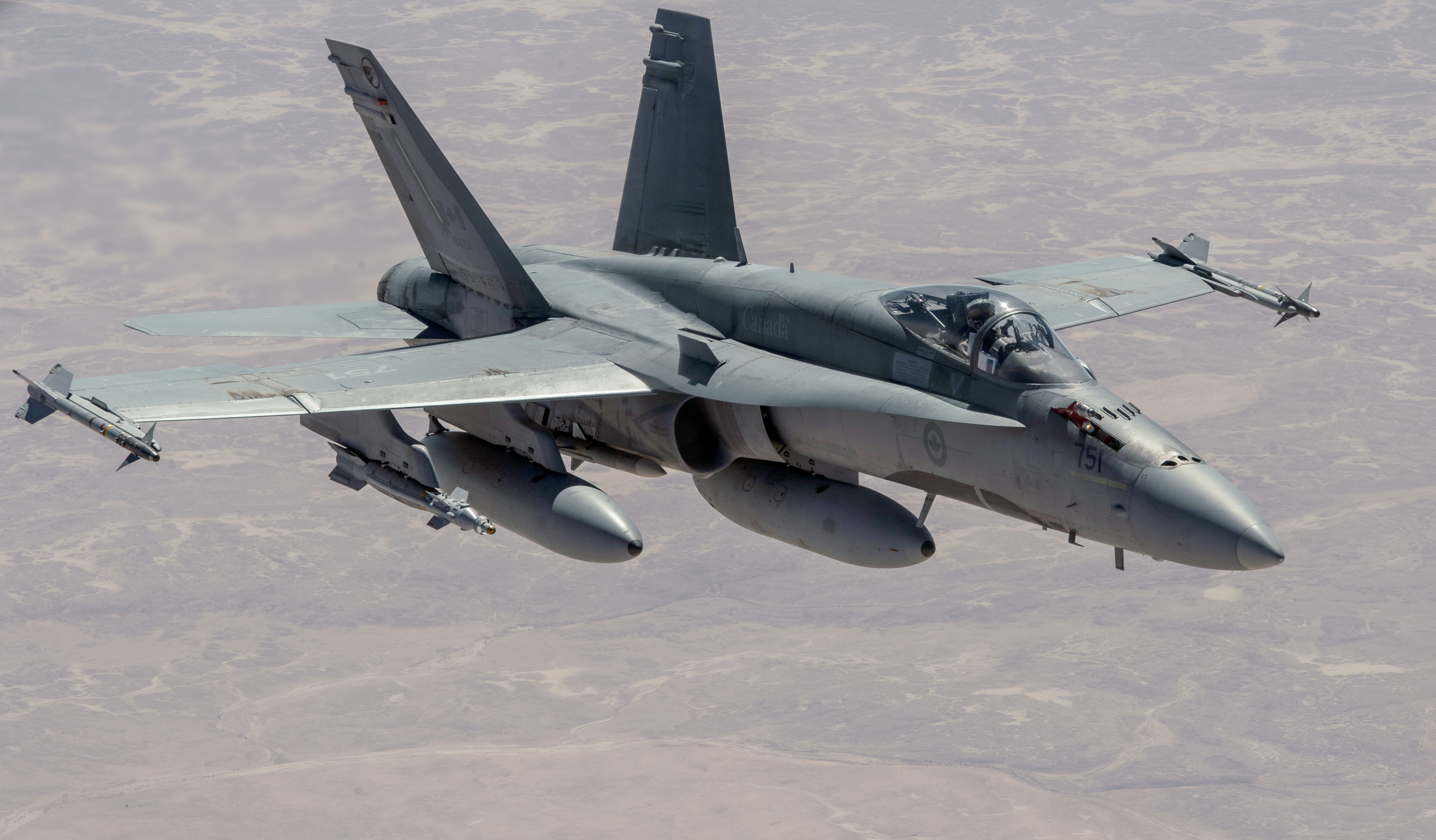
A CF-18 during Operation Impact

On 12 November 2014, Canadian jets destroyed ISIL artillery just outside the Northern Iraqi town of Baiji. Airstrikes continued throughout December and into January, 2015, totaling 28 strike missions. It was then reported that Canadian special forces troops, which had been highlighting targets for airstrikes, had engaged in fighting after coming under attack.

On 19 January 2015, Canadian special operations forces came under ISIL attack for the first time in Iraq, and returned sniper fire to "neutralize" the threat. Canadians are "enabling airstrikes from the ground," meaning they are actively finding targets for jets flying overhead.

On 29 January 2015, Canadian special forces in Iraq came under fire from ISIL forces, causing the Canadian troops to return fire, killing some ISIL militants. On 6 March, a Canadian soldier was killed in a friendly fire incident by Kurdish forces while returning to an observation post.

On 8 April 2015, two CF-18s carried out their first airstrike against ISIL in Syria, hitting one of the group's garrisons.

From 2 November 2014 to 13 May 2015 the Canadian armed forces struck 80 ISIL fighting positions, 19 ISIL vehicles, and 10 storage facilities.

On 21 October 2015, Canadian Prime Minister-designate Justin Trudeau informed U.S. President Barack Obama that he intended to withdraw Canadian aircraft from operations over Iraq and Syria but increase training missions on the ground.

On 8 February 2016, Canadian Prime Minister Justin Trudeau announced that the CF-18s would be withdrawn from the bombing mission no later than 22 February 2016. However, the surveillance aircraft and air-to-air jet refueller would continue. In addition, the amount of training troops would triple.

The Canadian Government would extend the Operation until 31 March 2025.

==== Dutch airstrikes ====
On 24 September 2014, the Dutch government announced its participation in "the military campaign" against ISIL which, as they claimed, had been started by the United States, and sent six F-16 fighter jets to Iraq to bomb ISIL. Their motivations to join this war: ISIL's advance in Iraq and Syria, while displaying "unprecedented violence" and "perpetrating terrible crimes against population groups", formed "a direct threat for that region"; ISIL's advance in Iraq and Syria "causes instability at the borders of Europe" which threatens "our own [Dutch] safety". Figures requested by RTL Nieuws in August 2015 showed that the Netherlands was among the most active countries within the coalition, third behind only the United States and the United Kingdom. In January 2016, the Netherlands extended their bombings of ISIL to Syrian territory. By the end of July 2016 the Dutch Air Task Force flew more than 2100 missions and carried out over 1800 air strikes. At the end of the Dutch contribution to the Air Task Force, in December 2018, the Royal Netherlands Air Force had flown over 3000 missions and conducted approximately 2100 air strikes.

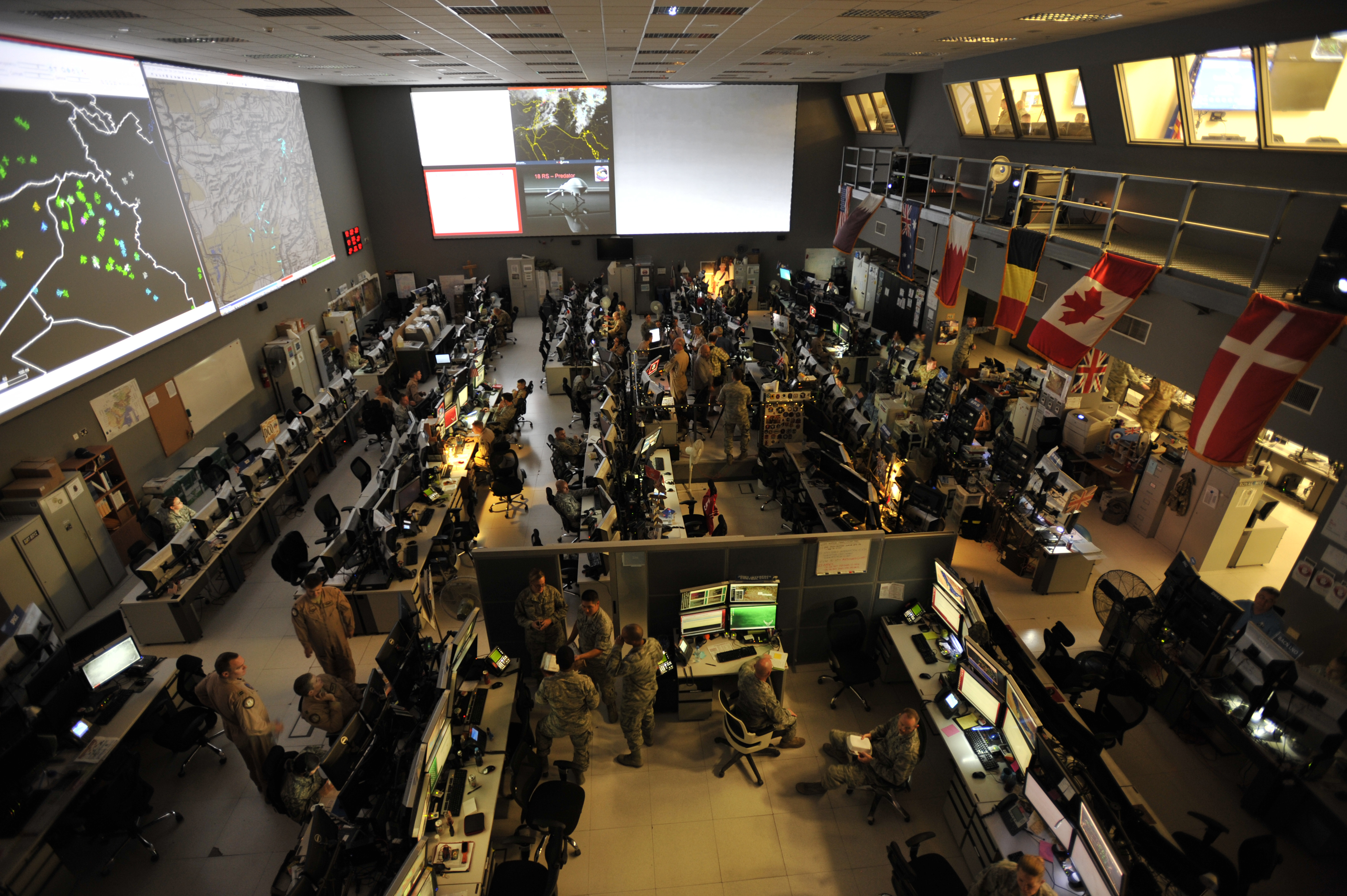
Combined Air and Space Operations Center (CAOC) at Al Udeid Air Base, Qatar, provides command and control of air power throughout Iraq and Syria.

==== French airstrikes ====
On 19 September 2014, the French Air Force used its Rafale jets to conduct airstrikes on IS targets in Mosul. The airstrikes were approved by French President François Hollande, which indicated that France was committed to fighting IS using air power alongside the United States. Hollande mentioned that no ground troops would be used in the conflict. To conduct its airstrikes, France deployed 9 Rafale fighters to the United Arab Emirates, 6 Dassault Mirage 2000 fighters to Jordan, in addition to an Atlantique 2 maritime patrol aircraft, a Boeing E-3 Sentry airborne early warning and control aircraft, and a Boeing KC-135 Stratotanker aerial refueling tanker.

On 23 February 2015, the French Navy also deployed its Task Force 473 carrier strike group to the Persian Gulf with the intent on conducting airstrikes from the aircraft carrier Charles de Gaulle. The Charles de Gaulle contributed 12 Rafale fighters, 9 Dassault-Breguet Super Étendard strike aircraft, and 2 E-2C Hawkeye airborne early warning and control aircraft. The task force also included the French frigate Chevalier Paul (D621), a Rubis-class submarine, a Durance-class tanker, and the British frigate HMS Kent. After eight weeks of operations, the task force left the Persian Gulf on its way to India, heralding the end of its contribution to Operation Chammal.

On 5 November 2015, it was announced that the Charles de Gaulle would resume operations in Syria to fight IS.

On 15 November 2015, after the November 2015 Paris attacks, the French Air Force launched its largest airstrike of the bombing campaign sending 12 planes, including 10 fighters, that dropped 20 bombs in training camps and ammunition facilities in Raqqa, the de facto capital of IS.

==== Jordanian airstrikes ====
After the downed Jordanian pilot Muath al-Kasasbeh was executed by IS by being burned to death, King Abdullah II vowed revenge and temporarily took the lead in the bombing raids on IS during February 2015. On 8 February, Jordan claimed that during the course of 3 days, from 5–7 February, their airstrikes alone had killed 7,000 ISIL militants in Iraq and Syria, and also reportedly degraded 20% of the militant group's capability.

==== Moroccan airstrikes ====
In December 2014 Morocco sent 4 F-16s to bomb ISIL positions, initially in the outskirts of Baghdad and other undisclosed locations. The planes operated under the command of the UAE and suspended operations in February 2015.

=== Iranian intervention ===
In mid-June 2014, according to American and British sources, Iran sent Qasem Soleimani, commanding general of the Islamic Revolutionary Guard Corps' Quds Force (IRGC-QF), to Iraq to help the government organize against ISIL. Later that month Iran started flying drones over Iraq, and by August, according to sources like Reuters, Iranian soldiers were in Iraq fighting ISIL. One war correspondent suggested that Iran "joined the air war" against ISIL on 21 June.

In July, according to the International Institute for Strategic Studies, Iran sent several Su-25 aircraft to Iraq, supported by Iranian/Iraqi ground crews trained in Iran. In early August, those Su-25s began combat against ISIL, according to Business Insider.

By September, according to Business Insider, Iranian Quds Force personnel were deployed to Samarra, Baghdad, Karbala, and the abandoned U.S. military post formerly known as Camp Speicher. At the end of November 2014, an Israeli website claimed to have seen Iranian F-4 Phantom II jet-fighters bombing ISIL in eastern Iraq; a claim the U.S. army verified.

In March and May 2015, American commentators indicated Qasem Soleimani was "leading Iraq's military strategy against ISIL".

Iran was mainly involved in the fight against Islamic State by supporting Shia militias from the Popular Mobilization Units both financially and militarily.

=== Hezbollah intervention ===
Already "for a long time" before June 2014, Hezbollah had a presence in Iraq of advisers offering guidance to Shia fighters, according to a Hezbollah commander interviewed by The National.

In June 2014, Hezbollah reportedly set up a dedicated command center in Lebanon to monitor developments in Iraq. On 17 June, Hezbollah leader Hassan Nasrallah said that the party was "ready to sacrifice martyrs in Iraq five times more than what we sacrificed in Syria in order to protect shrines."

In July 2014, Hezbollah sent more technical trainers and advisers to Iraq, to monitor ISIL's movements, according to a Hezbollah commander. Shortly thereafter, Hezbollah commander Ibrahim al-Hajj was reported killed in action near Mosul.

An August Reuters story reported there were "dozens" of Hezbollah "battle-hardened veterans" in Iraq, while the Christian Science Monitor reported the party had deployed a 250-man unit "responsible for advising, training, and coordinating the Iraqi Shia militias."

In February 2015, Nasrallah confirmed that he had sent troops to fight in Iraq.

== Libya ==
=== Egyptian airstrikes ===
After ISIL killed 21 Egyptian Coptic Christians in Libya, Egypt conducted airstrikes on ISIL targets in Libya on 16 February 2015, killing a total of 64 ISIL militants (50 in Derna). Warplanes acting under orders from the "official" Libyan government also struck targets in Derna, reportedly in coordination with Egypt's airstrikes. A Libyan official stated that more joint airstrikes would follow.

=== U.S. surveillance flights ===
Concern over ISIL activities in Derna District in Libya in December 2014 led to U.S. drones and electronic surveillance planes making "constant flights" from Italian bases, over the district of Derna.

=== U.S. airstrikes ===
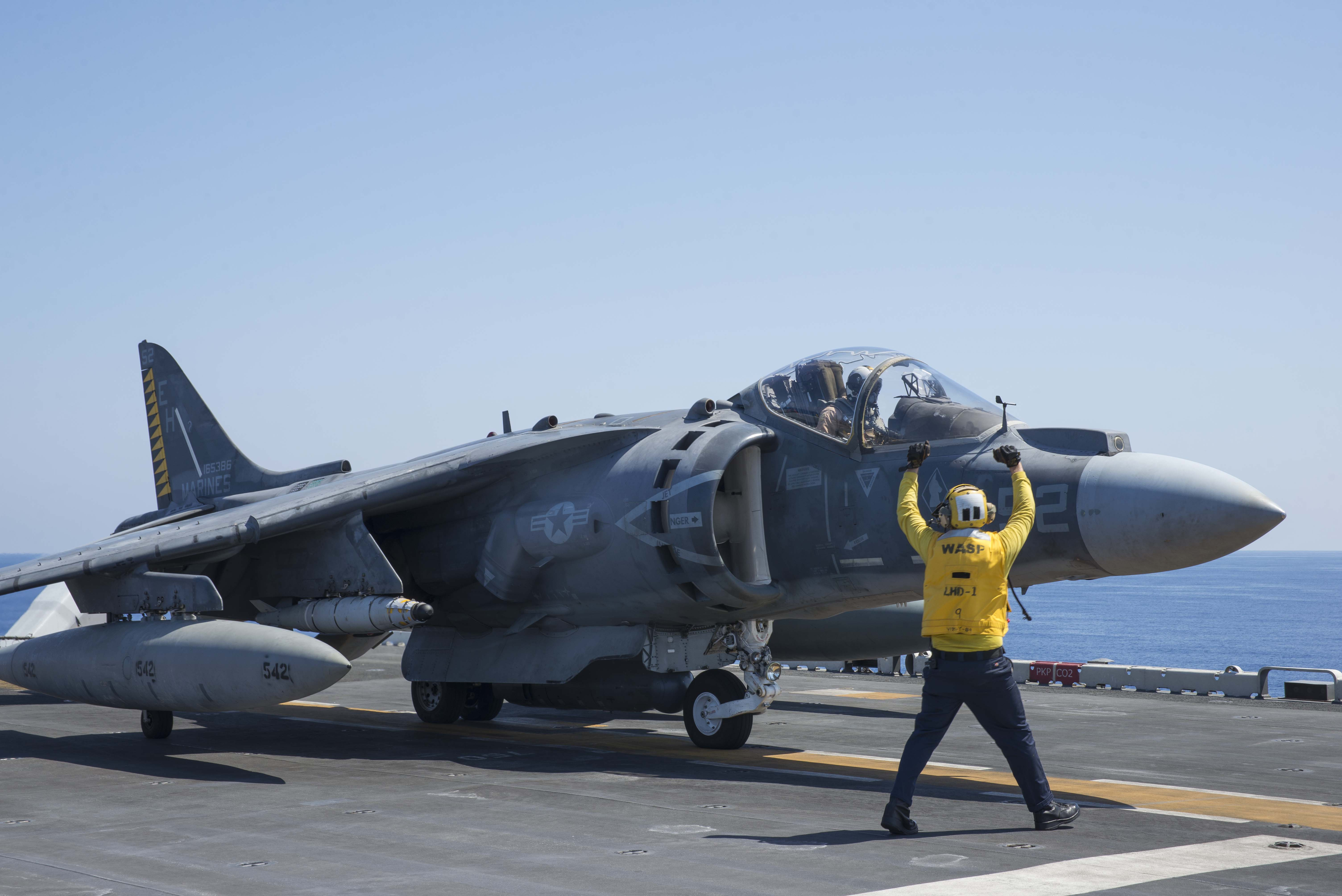
An AV-8B Harrier assigned to the 22nd MEU aboard USS Wasp taking part in Operation Odyssey Lightning on 11 August 2016.

On 15 November 2015, the United States launched an airstrike in Derna, Libya. Two U.S. F-15E fighter jets targeted senior ISIL leader Abu Nabil al-Anbari in the airstrike, who was the top ISIL commander in Libya. In January 2016, ISIL's Libyan faction confirmed Abu Nabil's death in a eulogy to him.

Administration officials are weighing a new campaign plan for Libya that would deepen the United States' military and diplomatic involvement, on yet another front against ISIL. The United States and its allies are increasing reconnaissance flights and intelligence collecting there—and even preparing for possible airstrikes and raids, according to senior American officials. Special Operations forces have met with various Libyan groups over the past months to vet them for possible action against ISIL.

On 19 February 2016, US warplanes carried out an airstrike on multiple ISIL targets in Libya, hitting an Islamic State training camp and a senior extremist leader, the training camp was near Sabratha, Libya, 60 people were present at the camp at the time of the strike, more than 40 people were killed with more wounded, some critically, On 14 February 2016, a U.N.-designated council presented a new 18-member Libyan cabinet in the Moroccan city of Skhirat, weeks after an earlier lineup was rejected. The internationally recognized parliament has to endorse the new unity cabinet. If approved, the new unity government could eventually seek international military intervention against Islamic State extremists who have taken advantage of the country's political vacuum since 2014.

On 1 August 2016, U.S. crewed and uncrewed aircraft carried out airstrikes on ISIL targets in Libya, responding to the U.N.-backed government's request to help push the militants from their stronghold of Sirte, in what U.S. officials described as the start of a sustained campaign against the extremist group in the city. President Barack Obama authorized the airstrikes after a recommendation by U.S. Secretary of Defense Ash Carter; the strikes hit an ISIL tank and two vehicles that posed a threat to forces aligned with Libyan GNA (Government of National Accord). This was the third U.S. air strike against Islamic State militants in Libya, but this time U.S. officials said it marked the start of a sustained air campaign rather than another isolated strike, U.S. airstrikes will continue to target ISIL in Sirte in order to enable the GNA to make a decisive, strategic advance. U.S. AFRICOM command is overseeing the US effort, which is known as Operation Odyssey Lightning, AV-8B Harrier II assigned to the 22nd MEU flying off USS Wasp conducted the airstrikes and uncrewed aircraft launched from undisclosed locations. Airstrikes continued, on 2 August, airstrikes hit a rocket launcher, an excavator and a pickup truck with a mounted recoilless rifle and on 3 August airstrikes struck a pickup truck with a mounted recoilless rifle; by 9 August the U.S. conducted 28 strikes against ISIL in Libya, with more than half of the strikes being conducted from uncrewed aircraft. By 16 August, U.S. airstrikes hit an ISIL vehicle and 4 militant positions in Sirte, bringing the number of U.S. airstrikes in Libya to 48. On 17 August, U.S. Africa Command officials announced on 16 August airstrikes on ISIL targets in Sirte struck 7 enemy fighting positions, 4 vehicle-borne bombs, 1 pickup truck with a mounted recoilless rifle, 12 enemy fighting positions and 1 command-and-control vehicle, bringing the total number of airstrikes in support of Operation Odyssey Lightning to 57. On 22 August, Stars and Stripes reported that U.S. Marine AH-1W SuperCobra helicopters participated in strikes against ISIL militants in Sirte on 20 and 21 August; a small detachment of US special forces in Sirte provided most of the targeting information for the airstrikes which were then relayed to U.S. forces through Libyan government troops. On 31 August, Stars and Stripes reported that in the past month, the U.S. military conducted 104 airstrikes against IS targets in Libya.

On 22 September, Stars and Stripes reported that the pace of US airstrikes against IS militants in Libya slowed in September as the number of insurgents holed up in a hard-to-target section of Sirte had shrunk, (the US conducted 50 airstrikes against IS targets, compared with 108 in August) with about 200 militants remaining. On 28 September, Fox News reported that as of 26 September, U.S. Marine Corps Harrier jets and attack helicopters as well as drones conducted 175 airstrikes against ISIL in Libya, according to the U.S. military's Africa Command. According to a U.S. official the number of ISIL fighters in Sirte was estimated to be "under 100" and that "ISIS is only in three neighborhoods."

On 3 October, Stars and Stripes reported that on 2 October the US conducted 20 airstrikes (bringing the total number of strikes to 201) in Libya: knocking out a command and control facility, nearly 70 IS fighting positions and several other sites in what was the heaviest day of bombing since the operation began, according to U.S. Africa Command data. The strikes were in support of an offensive by ground forces aligned with the internationally backed Libyan government. On 11 October, Stars and Stripes reported that U.S. warplanes conducted 51 airstrikes against ISIL targets in Libya, particularly in and around Sirte, between 7 and 10 October, marking it as some of the heaviest bombing since the start of the Operation; bringing the total number of U.S. airstrikes in Libya to 261. On 17 October, Fox News reported that US airstrikes against ISIS in Libya doubled in less than a month (bringing the number of airstrikes up to 324). On 21 October 2016, Stars and Stripes reported that USS San Antonio deployed to the Mediterranean Sea as part of Operation Odyssey Lightning to replace USS Wasp that was carrying out operations against ISIS. San Antonio will carry UH-1Y Hueys and AH-1W Cobras from the 22nd MEU's Aviation Combat Unit, VMM-264; Marine Harrier fighters were part of the operation aboard Wasp, however San Antonio does not host fighter jets.

On 4 November 2016, Fox News reported that the U.S. military ended its bombing campaign against ISIS in Sirte after three months of round-the-clock airstrikes the U.S. military conducted a total of 367 airstrikes since 1 August 2016, according to officials, no American airstrikes took place since 31 October; units taking part in the operation received orders on 1 November from AFRICOM to end offensive and collective self-defence airstrikes. A senior defense official said the U.S. military would "continue to provide military support to the GNA ... ISIL-held territory in Sirte is down to a few hundred square meters. We'll continue to discuss with the GNA leadership what additional support they may need moving forward including air strikes."

Sirte was liberated by GNA forces in early December; on 20 December 2016, ABC news reported that AFRICOM said that it carried out 495 airstrikes against militant vehicles and positions in the former IS stronghold of Sirte, Operation Odyssey Lightning concluded on 19 December, following an announcement from the Libyan government of the end of offensive military operations in Sirte.

On 18 January 2017, ABC News reported that two USAF B-2 bombers struck two ISIL camps 28 miles south of Sirte. The airstrikes targeted between 80 and 100 ISIS fighters in multiple camps, an uncrewed aircraft also participated in the airstrikes. One official called the airstrikes "a huge success," with more than 80 ISIL fighters killed, one counterterrorism official told ABC News there were "zero survivors" at the camps. Many of the ISIS fighters in the camps had fled Sirte during the battle, according to another official; Pentagon press secretary Peter Cook said in a statement ISIS fighters had fled to the remote desert camps "in order to reorganize and they posed a security threat to Libya, the region, and U.S. national interests;" The militants were carrying weapons, wearing tactical vests and standing in formation. The airstrikes were authorised by President Obama and were carried out in coordination with GNA; they are considered to be an extension of Operation Odyssey Lightning. BBC News reported that the B-2s flew a round-trip of around 34 hours from Missouri and dropped around 100 bombs on their targets, US Defence Secretary Ash Carter said those targeted were "actively planning" attacks in Europe. NBC News later reported that the number of ISIL fighters killed was revised upward to 90; a U.S. defense official said that "This was the largest remaining ISIS presence in Libya," and that "They have been largely marginalised but I am hesitant to say they've been completely eliminated in Libya."

On 22 September 2017, the US military conducted 6 airstrikes with unmanned aircraft on an ISI: camp 150 miles southeast of Sirte, killing 17 militants and destroying three vehicles. CNN reported an AFRICOM statement that the strikes took place "In coordination with Libya's Government of National Accord and aligned forces" and that "The camp was used by ISIS to move fighters in and out of the country; stockpile weapons and equipment; and to plot and conduct attacks". The strikes marked the first time airstrikes had been carried out in the country under the Donald Trump administration.

=== Other actions ===
The U.S. military has been closely monitoring ISIL movements in Libya, and small teams of U.S. military personnel moved in and out of the country over a period of months in early 2016. British, French, Italian and Jordanian special forces as well as the British RAF were also in Libya helping with aerial surveillance, mapping and intelligence gathering in several cities, including Benghazi in the east and Zintan in the west, according to two Libyan military officials who were coordinating with them. British and American special forces were also carrying out intelligence-gathering operations around Sirte.

Since the beginning of 2016, British Special forces have been escorting teams of MI6 agents to meet with Libyan officials and organise the supplying weapons and training to the Libyan Army and to militias fighting against ISIL. On 27 February 2016, The Telegraph reported that British special forces had deployed alongside its U.S. counterparts in the city of Misrata to stop Islamist militants progress, their main role is to give tactical training to local militias and to build an army to fight ISIL. In May 2016, it was reported that British special forces engaged in frontline combat against ISIL in Libya; in particular they destroyed two ISIL suicide vehicles that were targeting Libyan fighters. On 12 May, at the Shaddadah Bridge, 50 miles south of Misrata, the approach of a suicide vehicle sent Libyan forces fleeing in panic, British special forces intervened and destroyed the vehicle with a missile. An estimated dozen U.S. special forces operated out of a base near Misrata and were in action near Tripoli.

In a plan disclosed in late 2015, Britain was to offer the Libyan government 1,000 troops as part of a 5,000-strong combined with Italy, to train and equip the Libyan forces rather than take part in frontline fighting. In addition, British defence minister Michael Fallon announced that Britain is sending 20 troops from the 4th Infantry Brigade to Tunisia to help prevent Islamic State fighters from moving into the country from Libya.

In June 2016, it was reported that ISIL militants were retreating from Sirte and some fighters reportedly cutting off their beards and long hair to blend in with civilians as militia fighters allied to the unity government pushed into the city in tanks and armed trucks. The militias, mostly from Misrata, are allied to and are the main fighting force for the U.N.-brokered unity government installed in Tripoli the previous year. On 11 June, the BBC reported that Libyan forces claimed they retook control of part of Sirte after fierce fighting against ISIL militants. In July 2016, UN Secretary-General Ban Ki-moon said ISIL fighters in Libya were facing the "distinct possibility" of defeat in their last stronghold and are likely to scatter elsewhere in the country and the region; At the beginning of 2016, ISIL was believed to have more than 5,000 fighters in Libya, by August 2016, estimates said there could be less than 1,000 left, and by 9 August, only 350 ISIL fighters remained alive in Sirte. U.S. and British special forces were involved in the battle for Sirte: U.S. troops were operating out of a joint operations center on the city's outskirts, their role was limited to supporting forces unity government forces, providing direct, on-the-ground support. On 22 September, Stars and Stripes reported that Since the start of the battle, many ISIL members fled the city, "looking to hide among the population, relocate to other Libyan towns or attempting to leave Libya altogether."

== Afghanistan ==
The BBC reported that IS's announcement of the establishment of its Afghanistan/Pakistan-based Khorasan Province (IS-KP) in January 2015, it was the first time that IS had officially spread outside the Arab world. Within weeks, the group appeared in at least five provinces in Afghanistan: Helmand, Zabul, Farah, Logar and Nangarhar-trying to establish pockets of territory from which to expand. In the first half of 2015, IS-KP managed to capture large parts of territory in eastern Nangarhar province. This became the de facto "capital" principally for two reasons: its proximity to the tribal areas of Pakistan, home of IS-KP's top leaders; and the presence of some people who follow a similar Salafi/Wahhabi interpretation of Islam to IS. IS-KP is also trying to get a foothold in northern Afghanistan, where it aims to link up with Central Asian, Chechen and Chinese Uighur militants; IS's numerical strength inside Afghanistan vary, ranging from 1,000 to 5,000.

In February 2015, IS-KP deputy commander Mullah Abdul Rauf Khadim was killed in a U.S. drone strike along with 5 others, his successor met the same fate a month later, and since then, the Islamic State has been absent from the southern Afghanistan.

A report says that, according to a Tehrik-i-Taliban Pakistan (TTP) spokesperson, in July 2015, a U.S. drone strike killed Shahidullah Shadid, a senior leader of IS-KP and 24 other militants, in Nangarhar province in Afghanistan.

In January 2016, President Obama sent a directive to the Pentagon to make it easier for the military to get approval for strikes in Afghanistan, targeting militias that have sworn allegiance to IS. For 3 weeks in that month, the United States military carried out at least a dozen operations, including commando raids and airstrikes, many of these raids and strikes taking place in the Tora Bora region of Nangarhar Province. American commanders in Afghanistan said they believed that between 90 and 100 IS militants had been killed in these recent operations. On 1 February 2016, U.S. airstrikes in Nangarhar province eastern Afghanistan killed 29 IS fighters and struck the terrorist group's FM radio station. On 21 February, it was reported that just over a week before, Afghan forces supported by U.S. airstrikes pushed IS militants out of their stronghold in Nangarhar province in a military operation that had killed a total 43 IS militants by 22 February. On 6 March 2016, Afghanistan's president announced that the IS-KP had been defeated in the eastern parts of the country, Afghan forces claimed victory following the 21-day operation in 2 districts in Nangarhar province, claiming at least 200 militants killed. following this operation, an official confirmed that IS-KP militants had moved into Kunduz province and into Kunar province.

In early April 2016, it was reported that US and Afghan forces had killed 1,979 suspected militants, 736 others wounded and 965 detained between April 2015 and March 2016, IS militants have also been trying to flee into Ghazni and Nuristan province, whilst there has been a rise in defections from the group to the government and the Taliban. U.S. commanders in Kabul have scaled back their threat assessment for IS-KP, since January, the U.S. and its allies launched between 70 and 80 airstrikes on IS militants in Afghanistan.

In late June 2016, IS militants attacked police checkpoints in the Kot area of Nangarhar province and heavy fighting ensued, as many as 36 IS militants were killed in the assaults, at least a dozen Afghan security forces and civilians were killed, with another 18 wounded. The latest attacks indicate the group remains a potent threat to a government.

On 8 July 2016, The Guardian reported that Prime minister David Cameron increased the number of British troops deployed to Afghanistan from 450 to 500, and that 21 of these additional troops would reinforce the counter-terrorism mission.

On 23 July 2016, following the Kabul bombing, Afghan forces and U.S. special forces backed by U.S. airstrikes began an operation to retake parts on Nangarhar province from IS-KP militants. Over 24 and 25 July whilst clearing areas of southern Nangarhar with Afghan special operations troops, 5 U.S. special forces troops were wounded by small arms fire or shrapnel, making it the first reported instance of U.S. troops being wounded in fighting IS in Afghanistan. On 26 July, one of the most important leaders of IS in the region and one of the founders of the IS-KP, Saad Emarati, was killed along with 120 other suspected militants in Kot District, Afghan troops pushed into Kot District, meeting little resistance due to heavy air and artillery bombardment that forced IS fighters to flee into nearby mountain areas, Afghan forces found an already destroyed training camp. Overall, the operation reclaimed large and significant parts of eastern Afghanistan, forcing IS militants back into the mountains of southern Nangarhar with hundreds of IS militants killed; the estimated size of the IS-KP in January 2016 was around 3,000, but by July 2016 the number has been reduced to closely 1,000 to 1,500, with 70% of its fighters come from the TTP. In the operation, Afghan forces, backed by the US, killed an estimated 300 IS fighters.

Between January and early August 2016, U.S. aircraft conducted nearly 140 airstrikes against IS targets in Afghanistan, according to the U.S. military.

On 4 October 2016, a US soldier from B Company, 2nd Battalion, 10th SFG was killed by a roadside bomb blast in Achin, Nangarhar province, he was on a patrol with Afghan forces during an operation against IS-KP militants. This marked the first time a U.S. serviceman was killed in combat against IS militants in the country.

On 24 December 2016, Military.com reported that Brigadier General Charles Cleveland said that ISIL-KP's presence in the country has been pushed back from nearly a dozen districts to just two or three, the number of its members in Afghanistan had been reduced to about 1,000 from an estimated strength of between 1,500 and 3,000 members the previous year. Overall, U.S. troops in Afghanistan conducted more than 350 operations against the IS and al-Qaeda this year. In early December, General John Nicholson, the international coalition's top military commander in Afghanistan, said U.S.-led counter-terrorism operations and Afghan government forces had killed 12 of the organization's top leaders in the country. U.S. officials have said IS fighters are primarily located in Nangarhar and Kunar Province's. Military.com reported that Nicholson estimated that his forces had killed about 500 ISIS fighters throughout 2016 (including the 12 most senior leaders), these losses accounted for about 25 to 30% of IS-KP's total number of fighters and reduced its foothold in the country from 9 districts to 3.

In February 2017, the Washington Post reported that U.S. forces conducted more than 1,000 strikes in Afghanistan in 2016, including 267 against IS-K and 57 targeted al-Qaeda. The BBC also reported that IS-KP has largely been eliminated from southern and western Afghanistan by the Afghan Taliban and military operations conducted by Afghan and US/NATO forces. Several hundred IS-KP fighters have been killed in clashes with the Afghan Taliban.

In early April 2017, the Washington Post reported that Captain Bill Salvin, a spokesman for NATOs' mission to Afghanistan that Afghan and international forces have reduced IS-KP controlled territory in Afghanistan by two-thirds and killed around half of their fighters in the previous 2 years. Since the beginning of 2017, there have been 460 airstrikes against terrorists (with drone strikes alone killing more than 200 IS militants); he added that the affiliate has an estimated 600 to 800 fighters in two eastern Afghan provinces.

The Army Times reported that in early March 2017, American and Afghan forces launched Operation Hamza to "flush" IS-KP from its stronghold in eastern Afghanistan, engaging in regular ground battles. Stars and Stripes reported that General Dawlat Waziri, spokesman for Afghanistan's Defense Ministry, said that for four weeks before the 13 April Nangarhar airstrike (which was part of the operation), Afghan special forces unsuccessfully attempted to penetrate the area because of the difficult terrain and improvised explosive device (IEDs) planted by IS-KP militants. On 13 April, the Nangarhar airstrike took place, Stars and Stripes reported that 94 IS-KP militants, including 4 commanders were killed by a GBU-43/B MOAB bomb that was dropped on an IS tunnel complex in Achin District; the Huffington Post reported that the bomb was dropped from a U.S.Lockheed MC-130. In late April Military Times reported that Captain Bill Salvin said an estimated 400 to 700 fighters are active throughout Nangarhar and Kunar provinces.

Sky News reported on 3 September 2018 that British special forces were also targeting IS-K in Afghanistan alongside US special forces.

On 19 November 2019, Stars and Stripes reported that 243 IS fighters and nearly 400 family members surrendered to government forces in Nangarhar Province during the previous two weeks. Afghan President Ashraf Ghani declared that "the result is Daesh's backbone was broken".

On 26 August 2021 during the American evacuation from Afghanistan, a member of IS-K detonated a bomb near a gate at Kabul International Airport, killing at least 183 civilians and 13 US soldiers. In the immediate aftermath of the attack, the US conducted a retaliatory strike on a vehicle in Nangarhar province which was believed to be carrying "high-profile ISIS targets" and "planners and facilitators." Two days later, a US drone strike targeted what was believed to be a member of IS-K planning an attack, killing 10 civilians, including 7 children. The Pentagon later called the strike "an honest mistake" and announced that none of the military personnel involved would be subject to any disciplinary actions.

== Boko Haram-ISWAP insurgency ==
=== U.S. intervention in Cameroon ===
In October 2015, with the approval of the Cameroonian government, the U.S. military deployed 300 personnel to Cameroon, their primary missions will revolve around providing intelligence support to local forces as well as conducting reconnaissance flights.

== The Philippines ==
On 1 September 2017, the US Secretary of Defence Mattis designated Operation Pacific Eagle – Philippines (OPE-P) as a contingency operation to support the Philippine government and the Armed Forces of the Philippines in their efforts to isolate, degrade, and defeat the affiliates of ISIS (collectively referred to as ISIS-Philippines or ISIS-P) and other terrorist organisations in the Philippines.

== Yemen ==
CNN reported that on 16 October 2017, US forces conducted airstrikes against two IS training camps located in al Bayda Governorate, Yemen, containing an estimated 50 fighters; a US defence official said that this is the first U.S. strike specifically targeting IS in Yemen, the strike disrupted the group's attempts to train more fighters. CNN reported that on 23 October that two U.S. airstrikes in al Bayda Governorate, the first strike killed 7 IS terrorists travelling in pickup trucks, a second strike (5 miles west) killed a further 2 IS terrorists. Military Times reported that on 25 October, two US airstrikes in al-Bayda Governorate killed 9 IS fighters, a CENTCOM statement said that "In the last ten days, U.S. forces have targeted and killed approximately 60 ISIS terrorists in Yemen." Maher Farrukh, an al-Qaida analyst for the Critical Threats Project at the American Enterprise Institute said that "AQAP and ISIS cooperate on a tactical level in central Yemen against al Houthi-Saleh forces, they often co-claim attacks and likely share some militants," and that "ISIS' continued presence in Yemen is likely sustained by its cooperation with AQAP, but it does not appear to be growing at this time."

== Gaza Strip ==
=== Before the separation of ISIS from al-Qaeda ===
The Islamic Emirate of Rafah was a short-lived militant state established by the Jund Ansar Allah, an Islamist group, in the town of Rafah in the Gaza Strip. It was declared on 14 August 2009, by Abdul Latif Moussa, also known as Abu Noor al-Maqdisi, during a sermon at the Ibn Taymiyyah Mosque. The emirate aimed to impose strict Islamic law and was aligned with the ideology of al-Qaeda and is believed to have been aided by ISIS.

Jund Ansar Allah, translated as "Soldiers of the Followers of God," was founded by Abdul Latif Moussa in 2008. The group quickly garnered attention due to its extreme interpretation of Islam and its opposition to the ruling Hamas government in the Gaza Strip (known locally as the Palestinian Government in Gaza or Palestinian Authority in Gaza). Tensions between Jund Ansar Allah and Hamas escalated when Moussa declared the establishment of the Islamic Emirate of Rafah, challenging the authority of Hamas.

The proclamation of the Islamic Emirate of Rafah was seen as a direct threat to the Hamas government, which had been the de facto authority in Gaza since 2007 (after winning the 2006 Palestinian legislative election but losing control of the West Bank Region in subsequent conflict). In response, Hamas launched a military operation against Jund Ansarf Allah. The confrontation culminated in a fierce battle at the Ibn Taymiyyah Mosque, where Abdul Latif Moussa and several of his followers were killed many of whom were ISI operatives. The emirate was dismantled, and Hamas reasserted its control over Rafah.

=== Palestinians in the Syrian civil war ===
In 2012, Hamas publicly turned against the Assad government and endorsed the Syrian opposition who were attempting to overthrow him. In a speech in Cairo, when Ismail Haniyeh was visiting from the Gaza Strip, he said, "I salute all the nations of the Arab Spring and I salute the heroic people of Syria who are striving for freedom, democracy, and reform". Government and opposition forces later both fought against ISIS in a multi sided conflict. This also put Hamas on a different side of the conflict to Iran, who Netanyahu also claims resemble to ISIS.

The Syrian civil war and insurgency included Aknaf Bait al-Maqdis (Arabic: أكناف بيت المقدس "The environs of Jerusalem", Full name: كتائب أكناف بيت المقدس على أرض الشام "Aknaf Beit al-Maqdis Brigades on the Land of the Levant"), a Palestinian militant group in the Yarmouk Camp in Damascus, with ambiguous connections to Hamas. The group fought against ISIS and against Assad government forces in the Yarmouk Camp. Some sources say Hamas deny being connected to the group.

Violence in Yarmouk Camp first erupted in 2012. In 2015, ISIS attacked the Palestinian refugee camp at Yarmouk on the outskirts of Damascus. ISIS attacked Yarmouk again in 2018. Some PLO factions were involved in the fighting. The al-Qaeda splinter group Tahrir al-Sham was involved. As of 2021, 160,000 were still displaced.

The violence in the Yarmouk camp made the Assad government very unpopular in Palestine.

=== Hamas–ISIS conflict ===
Hamas have a history of violently suppressing Islamic extremists in the Gaza Strip. They have particularly clashed with supporters of Al-Qaeda and ISIS, and groups who conducted attacks against Palestinian Christians or other targets in the Gaza Strip. In 2009, Hamas security forces eliminated a small group of Al-Qaeda sympathisers who established the Islamic Emirate of Rafah.

ISIS arose in the rubble of the 2003 United States-led invasion of Iraq and the Syrian civil war (2011, ongoing), then later spread to the Sinai Peninsula and elsewhere. Hamas in Gaza clashed directly with the Sinai Province, but Hamas were also connected to groups on multiple sides of the conflict with ISIS in Syria.

ISIS first discreetly issued threats to Hamas in 2015, in the same video message they also threatened Hamas' two rivals Israel and Fatah.

==== Sinai Peninsula and Gaza Strip ====
In 2015, Hamas began a propaganda campaign to combat extremist ideologies in the Gaza Strip, At the time they denied it was targeted at ISIS or any other specific group. Mosques in the strip preached to promote a "centrist ideology".

In 2017, an ISIS suicide bomber at Rafah Border Crossing killed a Hamas government border guard (Nidal al-Jaafari, 28) and injured several others. Before anyone had claimed responsibility, Hamas described the bomber as an outlaw and "a person of deviant ideology", Hamas' terminology for Islamic extremists. Other factions also condemned the bomber.

Hamas arrested dozens of Salafi militants in the Gaza Strip.

In early January 2018, Palestinians from the Gaza Strip who had joined ISIS Sinai Province, captured and killed a man who they claimed was connected to the Qassam Brigades. The killers made a video of the murder and released it as a "declaration of war" against Hamas. The speaker in the video is referred to as Abu Kazem al-Maqdisi.

By 2023, the Egyptian branch of ISIS appeared to be completely dormant.

== Somalia ==
Military.com reported that on 3 November 2017, that a U.S. drone conducted two airstrikes against Islamic State in Somalia, at least six missiles were used which struck in Buqa, 37 miles north of Qandala, AFRICOM said in a statement that "several terrorists" were killed and that the strikes were carried out in coordination with Somalia's government; the strikes marked first time that the US has conducted airstrikes against ISS terrorists in Somalia. CNN reported that US drone aircraft conducted 5 strikes against al-Shabaab and ISS-linked militants between 9 and 12 November, killing 36 al-Shabaab and 4 ISIS terrorists. The US now estimates there are between 3,000 and 6,000 al-Shabaab fighters and less than 250 ISS operatives in Somalia. The US conducted a three strikes in al Bayda Governorate targeting ISIL in Yemen between 10 and 12 November 2017, killing 5 suspected militants.

Approximate map of the current phase of the Somali Civil War (Updated June 2025) Somalia: Under control of the Federal Government of Somalia, the African Union Support and Stabilization Mission in Somalia, and the United States Under control of the Government of Puntland Under control of the Jubaland Dervish Force and the Raskamboni Movement Jihadist insurgent groups: Under presence/control of al-Qaeda-backed al-Shabaab and allies Under control of Islamic State-backed Somalia Wilayah Somaliland: Under control of the self-declared state of Somaliland (For a more detailed map of the current military situation, see here.)

== Casualties ==
World map of groups and alliances in the war against ISIL CJTF-OIR Russia-Syria-Iran-Iraq Coalition Nigerian-led Intervention ISIL Presence

=== ISIL ===
On 22 January 2015, U.S. Ambassador to Iraq Stuart Jones stated that the coalition airstrikes had degraded ISIL, including killing off half of their leaders in Iraq and Syria.

In early February 2015, the Australian Defence Minister, Kevin Andrews, stated that more than 6,000 ISIL fighters had been killed in coalition airstrikes since they began, and that over 800 square kilometres (310 mi^{2}) had been recaptured; yet ISIL strength was estimated to have grown during this period to around 31,500 core fighters, including 3,000 fighters from Western nations.

On 23 February 2015, U.S. General Lloyd Austin stated that over 8,500 ISIL militants had been killed by Coalition airstrikes in Iraq and Syria. In early March 2015, General Lloyd repeated this statement, saying that "ISIS has assumed a defensive crouch" in Iraq, and that "We are where we said we would be," in relation to the airstrikes. This was in contrast to Jordan's claim that its airstrikes alone had killed 7,000 ISIL militants in Iraq and Syria over the course of 3 days, from 5 to 7 February 2015.

In June 2015, U.S. Deputy Secretary of State Antony Blinken stated that over 10,000 ISIL fighters had been killed by Coalition airstrikes against the Islamic State.

On 21 January 2016, France's defence minister Jean-Yves Le Drian stated that over 22,000 ISIL fighters had been killed by Coalition airstrikes in Iraq and Syria.

In August 2016, U.S. Army Lieutenant General Sean MacFarland told reporters at a news briefing "Although it's no measure of success and its difficult to confirm, we estimate that over the past 11 months we've killed about 25,000 enemy fighters. When you add that to the 20,000 estimated killed prior to our arrival, that's 45,000 enemies taken off the battlefield."

In December 2016, a senior US military official told CNN that as many as 50,000 ISIL fighters have been killed since the war against the terror group began.

In 2023, the US Central Command issued a statement announcing that it had killed IS leader Khalid Aydd Ahmed al-Jabouri. According to the statement, al-Jabouri had been involved in planning attacks in the Middle East and Europe. The statement also claimed that no civilians were killed in the strike.

=== Civilians ===
According to Airwars, a team of independent journalists, by August 2015, 450 civilians had been killed by the U.S.-led coalition air campaign against ISIL in Iraq and Syria (of whom roughly 60% in Syria, 40% in Iraq). By that time, the U.S.-led coalition officially acknowledged only two non-combatant deaths. According to Airwars, by January 2016, "between 815 and 1,149 civilian non-combatants appear likely to have been killed in 135 incidents where there is fair reporting publicly available of an event, and where Coalition strikes were confirmed in the near vicinity on that date."

According to Airwars, about 1000 civilians had been killed by the U.S.-led coalition air campaign in March 2017 alone, gathering controversy and concern relating to the presidency of Donald Trump.

According to Airwars, the air strikes and artillery of U.S.-led coalition killed as many as 6,000 civilians in Iraq and Syria in 2017. According to Airwars, "In 2017 the war against ISIS [Islamic State] moved into the most densely-populated urban centres controlled by the group, with dire results for civilians."

Amnesty International and monitoring group Airwars report said, more than 1,600 civilians were killed in US-led coalition include, United States, Britain and France, during the four-month airstrike campaign against ISIL group from the Syrian city of Raqqa in 2017. The Coalition states have conducted 34,464 strikes against ISIL targets between August 2014 and end of March 2019, and killed at least 1,291 civilians. According to a report published by Syrian Network for Human Rights in 2024, 927 children lost their lives in coalition attacks in Syria.

=== Estimates by monitoring organizations ===
Estimated civilian casualties caused by Coalition member states
Country	Estimated civilian casualties	Notes
United States	8,000-13,000	Airwars estimates ~13,000 deaths; U.S. Central Command acknowledges ~1,500.
United Kingdom	~1,000	UK has confirmed only one death; Airwars estimates range much higher.
France	80-200	No confirmed cases; Amnesty International and Airwars report substantial harm during Raqqa operations.
Netherlands	77+	Dutch strike on Hawija (2015) killed at least 70 civilians. Initially denied; later confirmed. Dutch airstrike on residential building in Mosul killed at least seven civilians, per investigative reporting.
Turkey	~55	Airwars estimates 17 incidents where civilians were killed in strikes by the Turkish military, primarily in Syria, between 2019 and 2022.
Canada	37+	Canadian strike on Mosul (January 2015) allegedly killed 6-27 civilians. Canadian airstrike on East Mosul (November 2015) reportedly killed 10 workers at a dairy plant.
Australia	30-70	One confirmed death; others reported but unacknowledged, including an Australian airstrike on Mosul that reportedly killed 18 civilians.
Denmark	5-10	No official investigations; small number of reported incidents tracked by Airwars.

==== Official responses from coalition governments ====
- United States: Has officially acknowledged about 1,500 civilian deaths, far below Airwars' estimate of 8,000-13,000. While some internal Pentagon investigations have occurred, Amnesty International and Human Rights Watch have criticized the processes as opaque and insufficient.
- United Kingdom: Officially acknowledged only one civilian death, despite independent estimates suggesting far higher numbers. Repeated calls from Airwars, Amnesty International, and members of Parliament for independent investigations have not resulted in comprehensive reviews.
- France: Has not acknowledged any civilian casualties. The French Ministry of Armed Forces rarely comments on individual strikes. Amnesty International reports significant civilian harm during operations in Raqqa but no official French investigations.
- Netherlands: Initially denied any casualties in the 2015 Hawija strike, later confirming the deaths of at least 70 civilians after investigative journalism revealed the incident. Critics described the government's internal investigation as limited and lacking transparency.
- Turkey: The Turkish Defense Ministry denies that there had been any civilian casualties. Amnesty International reports that some Turkish airstrikes in northeast Syria targeted civilian infrastructure, including schools and markets.
- Canada: Officially maintains a record of zero civilian deaths, despite independent monitors identifying credible incidents involving at least 37 fatalities. Airwars and Amnesty International criticized Canada's flawed investigative process that ignores ground-level evidence, arguing that the Canadian government has avoided transparency and accountability.
- Australia: Acknowledged one civilian death in 2021, years after the incident, but has not publicly investigated other alleged cases.
- Denmark: No civilian deaths have been officially acknowledged, and Danish authorities have not publicly investigated reports of civilian harm linked to their strikes.

== Labeling ==
On 1 February 2015, Iraq's Foreign Minister Ibrahim al-Jaafari stated that the war on ISIL was effectively "World War III", due to ISIL's proclamation of a worldwide caliphate, its aims to conquer the world, and its success in spreading the conflict to multiple countries outside of the Levant region. Speaking of ISIL's destruction of pre-Islamic sites in the region, Syria's head of antiquities, Maamoun Abdul Karim, stated that "this is the entire world's battle". In June 2015, U.S. Deputy Secretary of State Antony Blinken said that ISIL "stands for nothing and depends on people who will fall for anything."

== Involvement by country ==
The table below summarizes each country's level of involvement in the overall international intervention against the Islamic State. Several countries that are militarily involved also provide humanitarian aid.

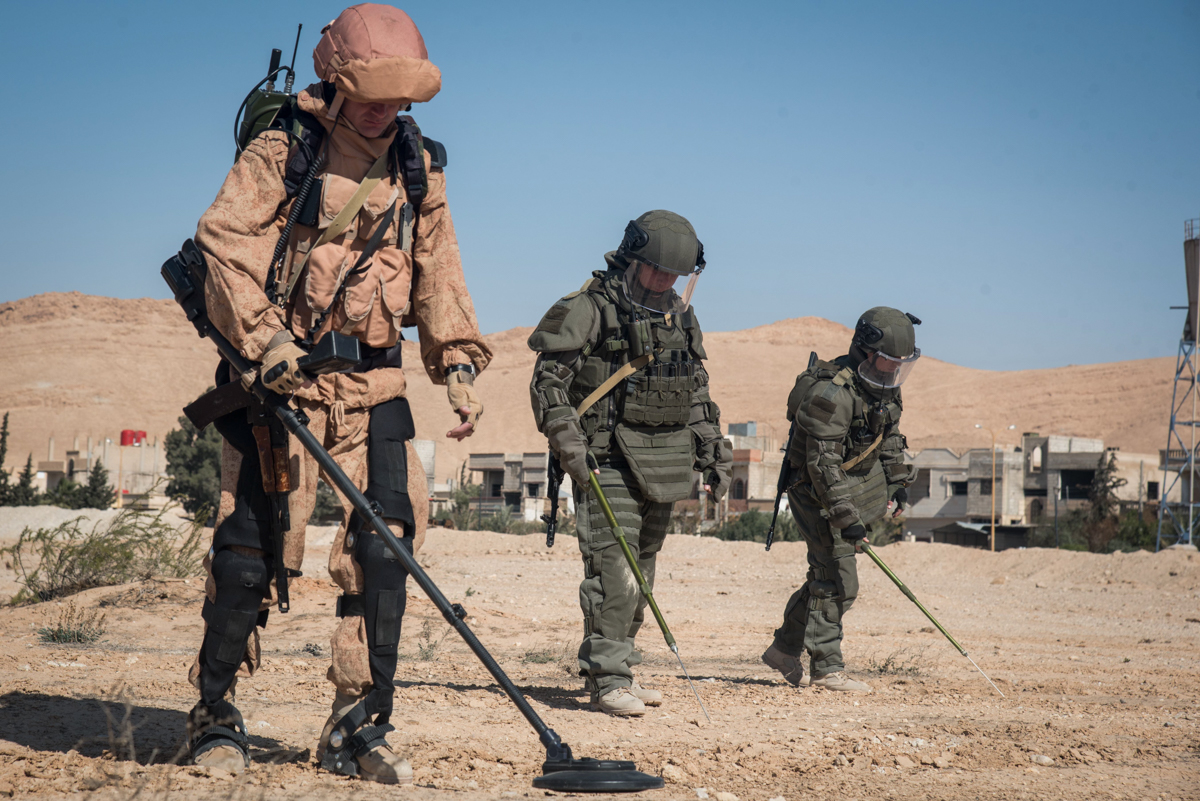
Russian sappers in Palmyra, Syria during the 2017 Eastern Homs offensive against the Islamic State.

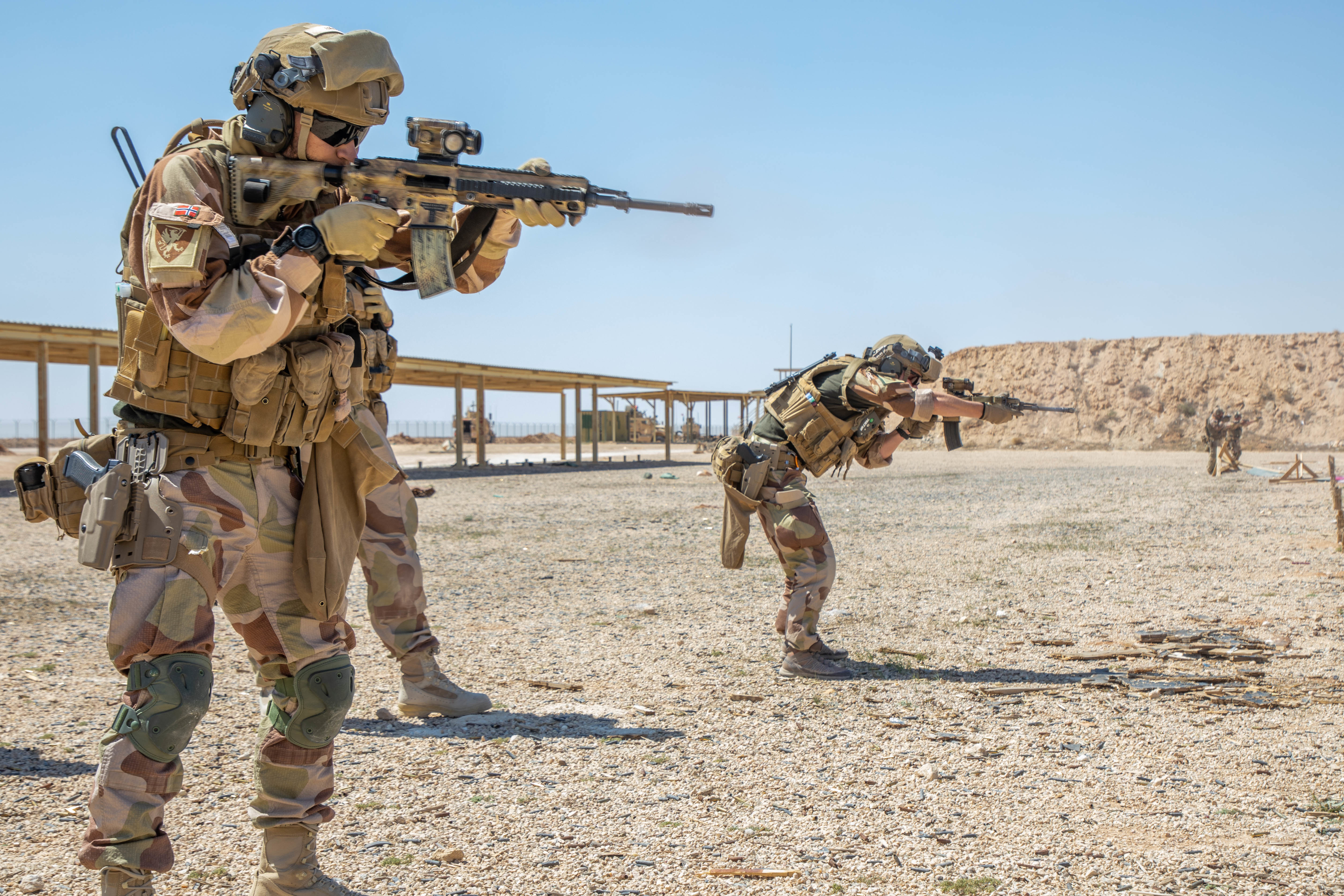
Norwegian Task Force Viking soldiers train near Al Asad Airbase during the Iraqi intervention, 29 March 2021

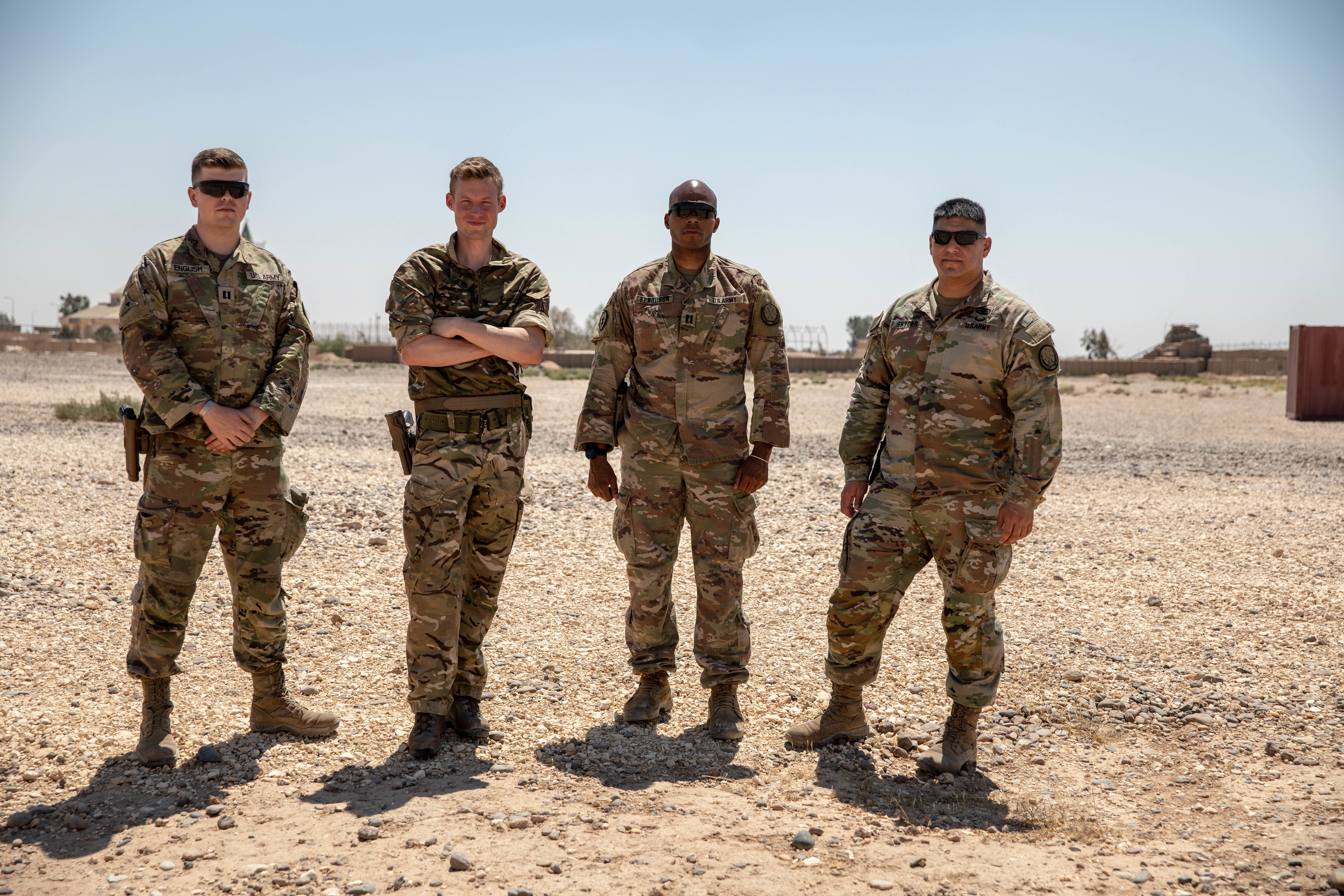
Combined Joint Task Force – Operation Inherent Resolve (CJTF–OIR) personnel pose for a picture during the Syrian intervention, 15 July 2021

Key: Military; Military aid; Humanitarian aid; Intelligence aid
Country	In Iraq	In Syria	In Libya	In Nigeria	In Afghanistan
Afghanistan	—	—	—	—	
Albania			—	—	—
Australia			—	—	—
Austria			—	—	—
Bahrain	—		—	—	—
Belgium			—	—	—
Bosnia and Herzegovina			—	—	—
Bulgaria			—	—	—
Cameroon	—	—	—		—
Canada			—		—
Chad	—	—	—		—
China			—		
Colombia	—	—	—		—
Croatia			—	—	
Czech Republic			—	—	—
Denmark			—	—	—
Egypt	—	—		—	—
Estonia			—	—	—
France					
Germany			—	—	
Greece			—	—	—
Hungary			—	—	—
Iran			—	—	—
Iraq			—	—	—
Ireland			—	—	—
Israel			—		—
Italy				—	
Japan			—	—	—
Jordan				—	—
Kuwait			—	—	—
Lebanon			—	—	—
Libya	—	—		—	—
Luxembourg			—	—	—
Morocco			—	—	—
Netherlands			—	—	—
New Zealand			—	—	—
Niger	—	—	—		—
Nigeria	—	—	—		—
North Macedonia	—		—	—	—
Norway			—	—	
Poland			—	—	—
Portugal			—	—	
Qatar	—		—	—	—
Russia			—	—	—
Saudi Arabia	—		—	—	—
Singapore			—	—	—
Slovakia			—	—	—
Slovenia			—	—	—
South Korea			—	—	—
Spain			—	—	—
Sweden		—	—	—	—
Syria			—	—	—
Taiwan			—	—	—
Turkey			—	—	—
United Arab Emirates	—		—	—	—
United Kingdom					
United States					

== See also ==
- 2003 invasion of Iraq
- War against Terror
- Arab Winter
- Combined Joint Task Force – Operation Inherent Resolve
- Iraq War
- List of wars and battles involving the Islamic State
- Islamic State invasion of Iraq
- Timeline of the Syrian civil war
