= Bassel al-Araj =

Palestinian activist and writer

- Born: 1984 al-Walaja, West Bank, Palestine
- Died: March 5, 2017 (aged 33) al-Bireh, West Bank
- Cause of death: Shot to death by Israel Defense Forces
- Other names: "The Educated Martyr"
- Occupation: Pharmacist

Bassel al-Araj (Arabic: باسل الأعرج, 1984 — March 5, 2017), known as al-muthaqqaf al-mushtabik (المُثَقَّف المُشْتَبِك 'the engaged intellectual') was a Palestinian activist and writer. Known for his writings about revolution and Arab nationalism, Al-Araj was shot and killed on 6 March 2017 by a unit belonging to Israel’s Yamam police force, after a gunfight lasting nearly two hours broke out as they raided his home in an attempted arrest. He is known as "the educated martyr" among some Palestinian activists. The charges that led to his arrest were unlicensed weapons and planning militant attacks against Israel, charges on which the Palestinian Authority previously arrested him. However, the Palestinian Authority released him from prison following mass protests against his detainment, leading to the Israeli arrest.

== Biography ==
Al-Araj was born in al-Walaja, a Palestinian village near Bethlehem. Al-Araj obtained his high school diploma from Bethlehem High School for Boys in 2002. He graduated with a degree in pharmacy in 2007 from October 6 University in Cairo, Egypt. He created an educational youth program in his village of Al-Walaja as well as partook in sit-ins and protests to oppose the West Bank barrier that Israel was actively building around the village. In 2009, al-Araj accepted a job as a pharmacist in Shu'fat Camp where he worked until 2011.

By 2011, al-Araj dedicated himself to studying, writing, and teaching Palestinian history of resistance. Some of his teaching initiatives included organizing educational bus tours to teach the history of Palestinian villages and towns and the history of Palestinian resistance, writing and being part of panels at the Popular University, and appearing as a guest on talk shows. He wrote extensively both as an independent educator and writer and as a part-time researcher at the Palestinian Museum.

Al-Araj faced repression and multiple arrests. On May 15, 2011, the IDF arrested al-Araj for a day and broke three of his ribs. On November 15, 2011, he was arrested with five of his colleagues at the "Freedom Rides Campaign" for crossing the West Bank Barrier into Jerusalem on an Israeli-Only bus. Along with five others, al-Araj was arrested by the Palestinian Authority in 2016 and charged with planning armed attacks against Israel. During their imprisonment in the PA-administered prison, an Addameer Prisoners Support and Human Rights Association’s attorney "confirmed that the detainees were subjected to different forms of ill-treatment, including sitting in stress positions (Shabah), sleep deprivation, continued interrogation, beating all over the body, insults and denial of using bathroom." On August 28, the group went on a hunger strike in demand of their freedom. During their nine-day hunger strike, al-Araj published a single sentence via his lawyer, "The da`i and the son of the da`i (one whose parents are unknown but someone claims him as his son) has required us to choose one of two: battle or humiliation. Far away we are from accepting humiliation" (Arabic: ألا إن الدعيّ بن الدعيّ قد ركز بين اثنتين، بين السّلة والذلّة.. وهيهات منّا الذلّة), a saying attributed to Husayn ibn Ali. Popular support for the men swelled, and the Palestinian courts ordered their release on bail of 500 Jordanian dinars.

After their release from prison, Israeli forces arrested several members of the group. al-Araj went into hiding for two months.

== Death ==
The IDF tracked al-Araj and repeatedly served warrants authorizing them to search his family's home and properties on the charges of holding unlicensed weapons and planning militant attacks against Israelis. The IDF located him on March 6, 2017, and surrounded him in an apartment near the Qaddura refugee camp in al-Bireh. He was engaged by the Israeli forces in a twenty-minute or two-hour gunfight, during which the IDF fired an Energa anti-tank rifle grenade, resulting in the partial destruction of the building, stormed the building, and killed al-Araj. According to Palestinian reports, the killing occurred after his ammunition was depleted, while Israeli reports state that al-Araj opened fire after IDF troops were already in the building. Palestinian reports reported that Israeli forces removed Al-Araj's corpse from the building by dragging him by his feet.

Mounir Shafik claims that al-Araj chose to hide and resist till the last day of his life rather than go to his family’s house because he wanted his death to be an inspiration for other Palestinians to ignite another intifada. Al-Araj's family reacted to his death by condemning not only Israeli forces for killing him but also the Palestinian Authority for their collusion with the latter. Al-Araj's brother, Saeed, called his brother a hero, further saying: "I am eternally proud of him... he lived in honor." Al-Araj's mother, Siham, condemned both the state of Israel and the Palestinian Authority for their treatment of him, claiming “Israeli soldiers killed him, but the PA paved the way for them." Similarly, his sister Doha condemned the state's media for abandoning al-Araj and his comrades, and called the PA "complicit in Bassel’s killing".

Hamas praised al-Araj as a role model for his militancy and Fatah condemned the raid without praising al-Araj. Neither organization claimed him as a member.

Despite promises to return al-Araj’s body earlier, Israel held his body for 11 days before the family was able to hold his funeral. After his death, thousands of mourners gathered at his funeral in his home village Al-Walaja. During the funeral, the community chanted “God is the greatest”, and “with our souls, with our blood, we sacrifice ourselves for you, martyr.” The proceedings were emotionally tense, with women chanting “Why, why, why? Once the authority, once the army,” At least 50 Israeli officers overlooked the funeral services with riot gear.

Right after his death, in Ramallah, protests emerged condemning Israel and the Palestinian Authority. The Palestinian Authority ended the protests by using violence against the protestors. Protests continued in Amman, Beirut, Berlin, Brussels, Cairo, London, Milan, Rabat, Tunis, Vienna, and New York.

== Legacy ==
Al-Araj’s death made him an icon of resistance and hope to young Palestinian activists. In 2017, a group of activists from Gaza made a video of Al-Araj addressing them and saying his motto, which was amplified after his death: “If you want to be an intellectual, you’d better be an engaged one.” His close friend, Hamza Aqrabawi commented: “Bassel was a beacon for the youth, and he left a mark on all those working to collect Palestinian history. He believed in a certain path and he sacrificed his own blood for it.”

In November 2018, Dar Rabal, a Palestinian publisher in Jerusalem, published the full works of al-Araj. Twenty-seven of al-Araj’s writings, most notably "Exiting Law and Entering Revolution" and "Live Like a Porcupine, Fight Like a Flea", and ninety of his online posts, including his famous post "Why Do We Go to War?", were collected and published posthumously in the text. The book's title, "I Have Found My Answers" (Arabic: وجدت أجوبتي), was taken from the will he wrote prior to his death. His will glorified Palestinian martyrdom and militancy.

On May 7, 2025, student protesters at Columbia University entered and took over the Lawrence A. Wien Reading Room of Butler Library, naming it the "Basel Al-Araj Popular University" as part of a broader protest movement demanding disinvestment from Israel amid the Gaza genocide. At the order of Columbia's administration, students were blocked in by Columbia's Public Safety and prevented from leaving unless they showed their student ID cards, causing a standoff for hours until the administration summoned the NYPD to arrest the students. The Trump administration praised Columbia's response as showing "fortitude and conviction", highlighting the enforcement of campus policies amid federal scrutiny over the university's handling of antisemitism allegations. The day before Columbia formalized its settlement with the Trump administration, its University Judicial Board issued expulsions, suspensions, and degree revocations to over 70 students who participated in the "Basel Al-Araj Popular University" occupation of Butler Library.
