= Palestinian refugee camps =

Clickable map of the Palestinian refugee camps

Palestinian refugee camps were first established to accommodate Palestinians who were displaced by the 1948 Palestinian expulsion and flight during the 1948 Palestine war. Camps were established by the United Nations Relief and Works Agency (UNRWA) in Jordan, Lebanon, Syria, the West Bank and the Gaza Strip. A subsequent wave of Palestinian refugees were created in the Naksa after the Six-Day War in 1967.

There are 68 Palestinian refugee camps in total, 58 official and 10 unofficial, ten of which were established after the Six-Day War while the others were established in 1948 to 1950s.

Only a third of registered Palestinian refugees live within the boundaries of the refugee camps. Most have integrated socially and economically outside the camps. Many live in adjacent geographic areas.

The number of registered Palestine refugees grew from 750,000 in 1950 to around 5 million in 2013.

== History ==
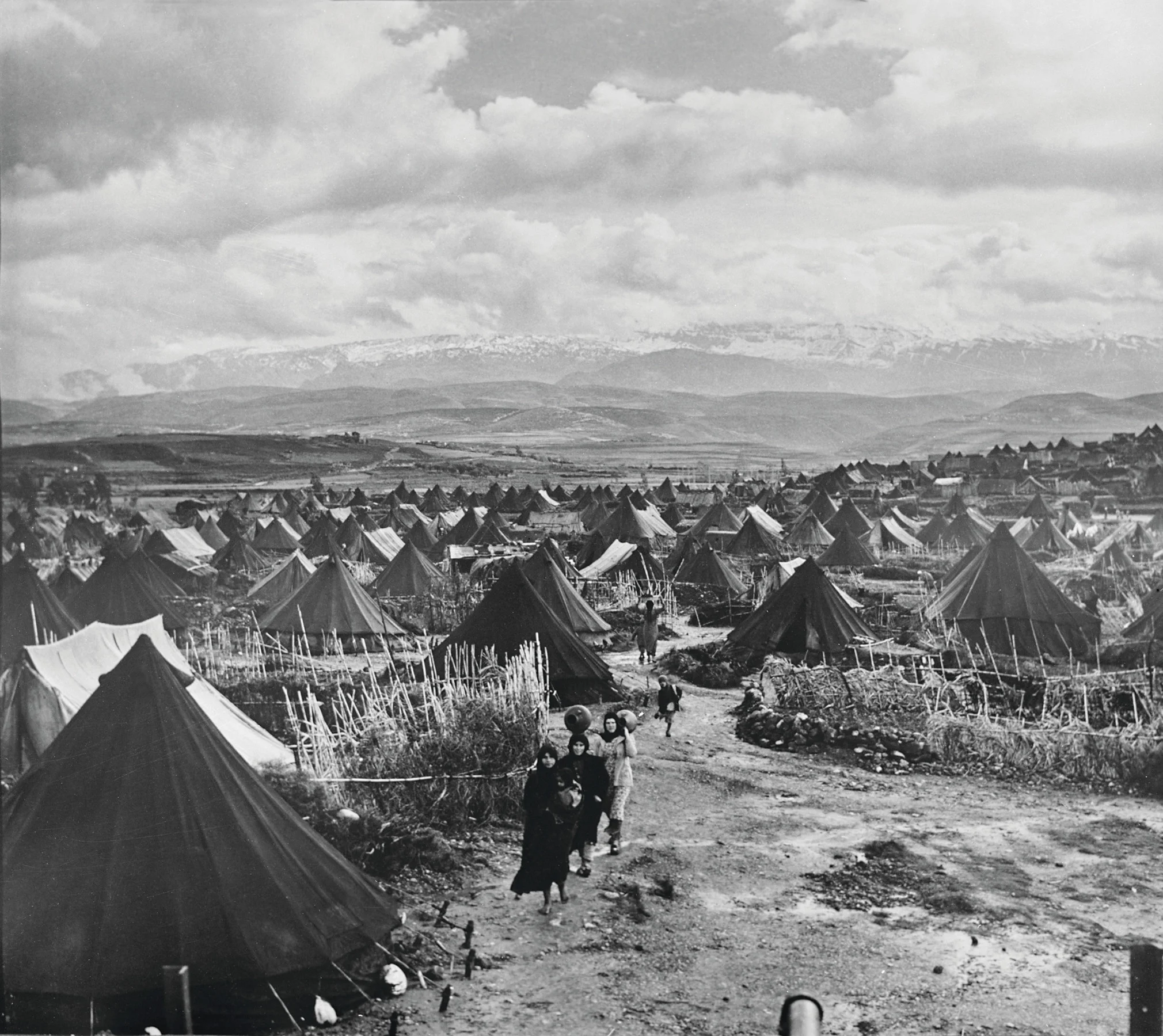
Nahr al-Bared refugee camp in Lebanon, 1952

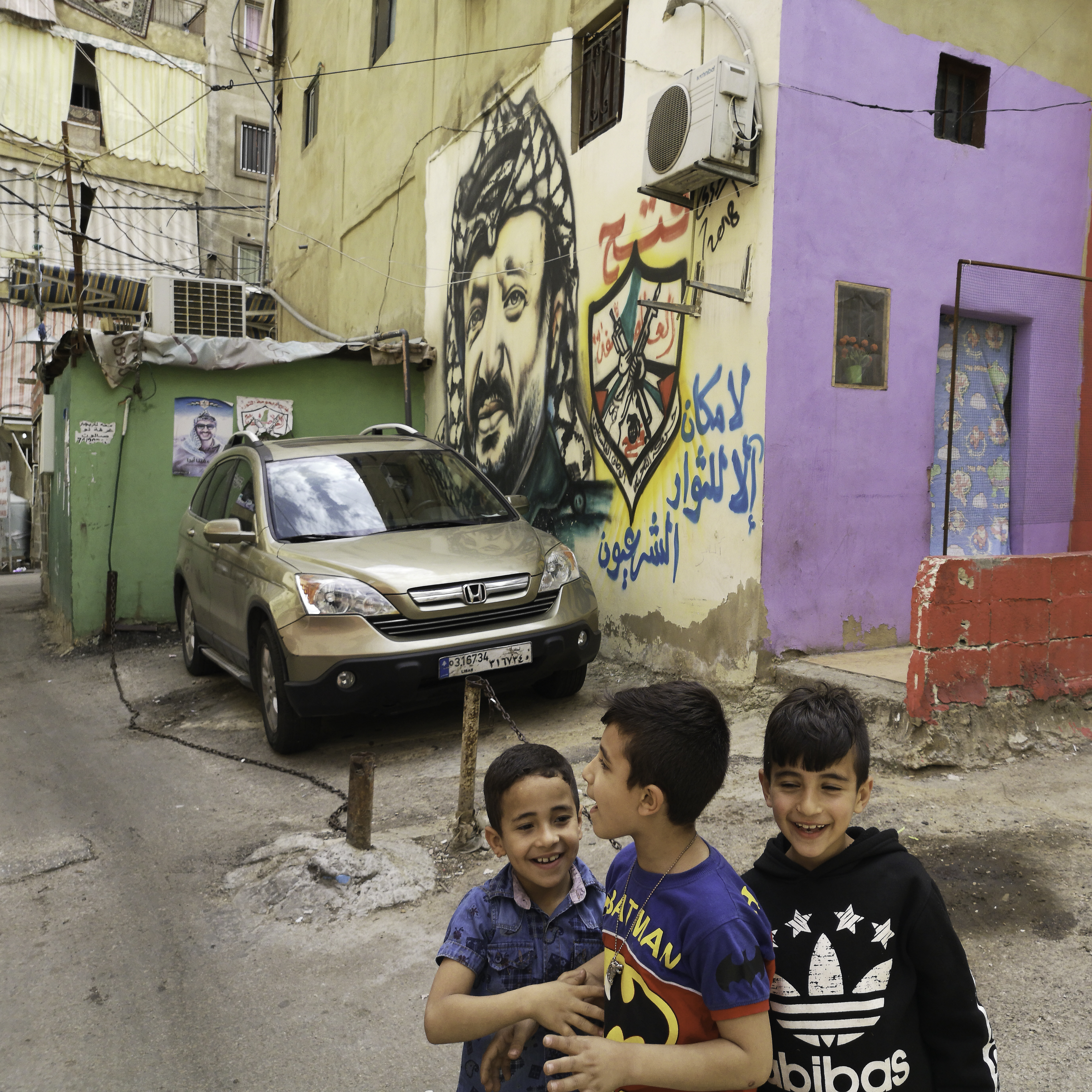
Shatila refugee camp on the outskirts of Beirut in 2019

=== Role of UNRWA ===
UNRWA's mandate is to provide assistance to Palestinian refugees, including access to its refugee camps. For this purpose, it defines Palestinian refugees as "persons whose normal place of residence was Palestine during the period 1 June 1946 to 15 May 1948, and who lost both home and means of livelihood as a result of the 1948 conflict."

UNRWA also extends assistance to the patrilineal descendants of such refugees, as well as their legally adopted children.

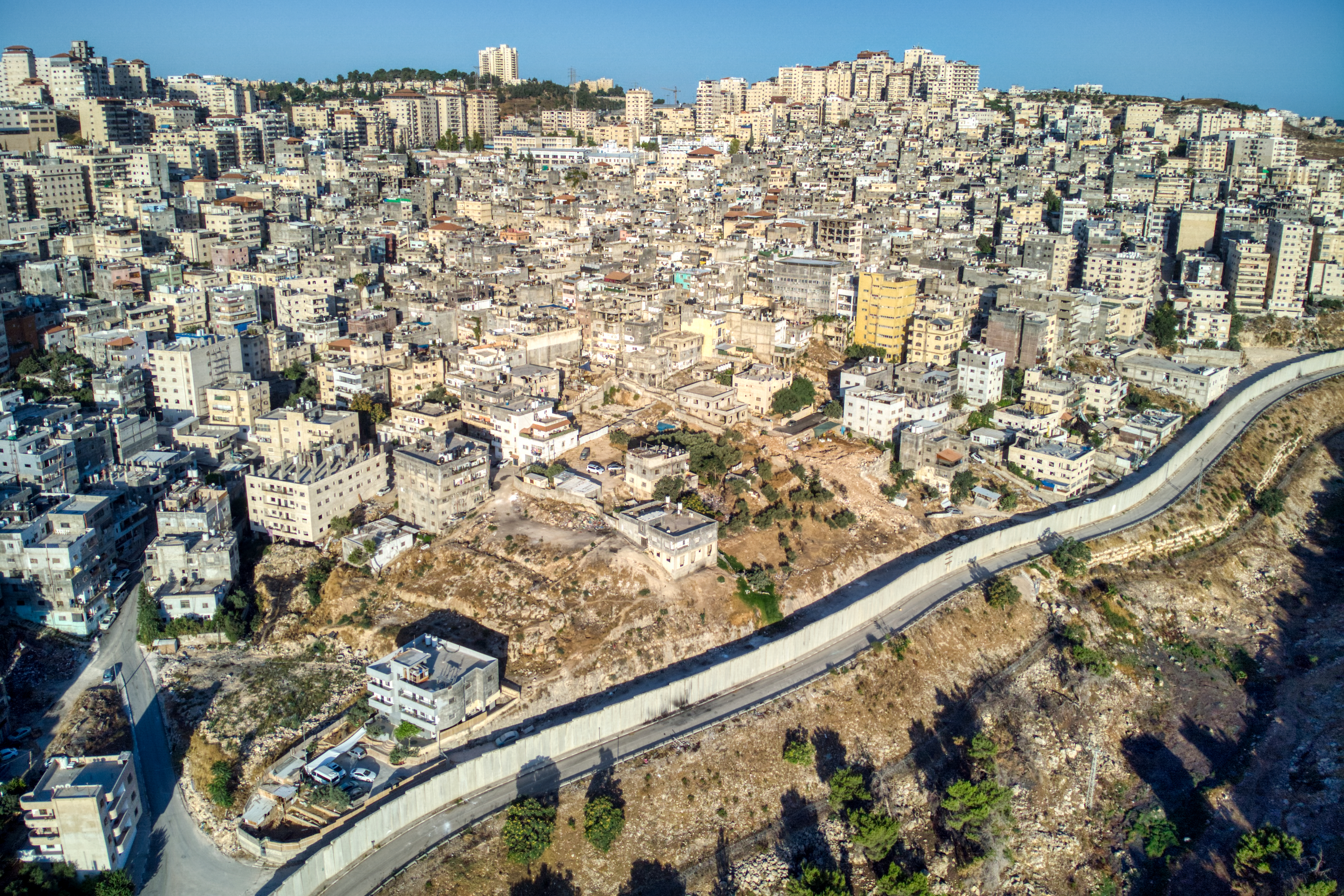
Shu'fat Camp in the city of Jerusalem, 2023. The official area of the camp is in the center of the image and is characterized by low-rise buildings; on either side of the camp are additional Palestinian neighborhoods located beyond the Israeli West Bank barrier (visible at the bottom of the image), where the buildings are taller.

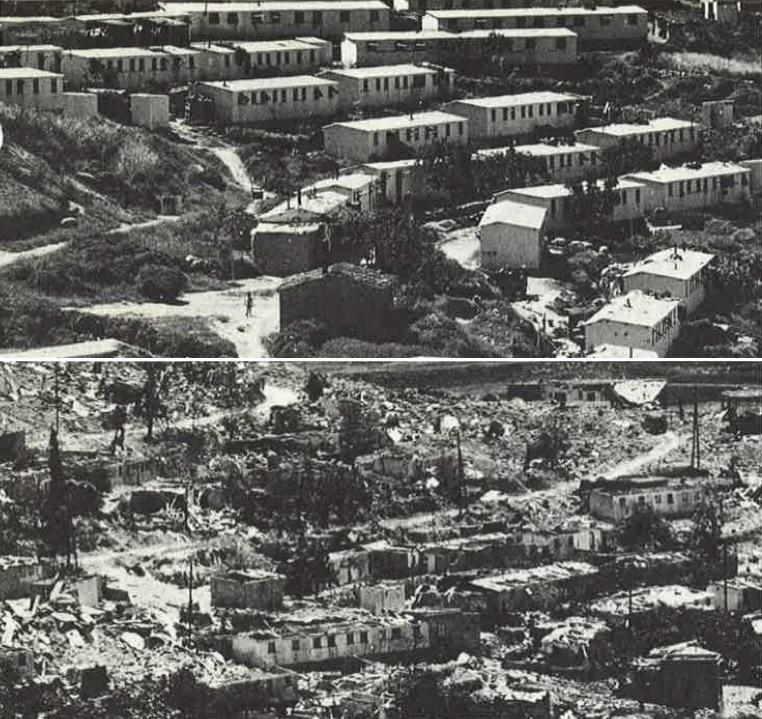
Nabatieh refugee camp before and after its destruction by the Israeli military in 1974

For a camp to be recognized by UNRWA, there must be an agreement between the host government and UNRWA governing use of the camp. UNRWA does not itself run any camps, has no police powers or administrative role, but simply provides services to the camp. UNRWA recognizes facilities in 58 designated refugee camps in Jordan, Lebanon, Syria, the West Bank and the Gaza Strip, and it also provides facilities in other areas where large numbers of registered Palestine refugees live outside of recognized camps. UNRWA also provided relief to Jewish displaced persons inside Israel following the 1948 conflict until the Israeli government took over responsibility for them in 1952. Refugee camps developed from tented cities to rows of concrete blockhouses to urban ghettos indistinguishable from their surroundings (effectively becoming urban developments within existing cities or by themselves), that house around one third of all registered Palestine refugees.

The Funding for UNRWA activities comes almost entirely from voluntary contributions from UN member states. UNRWA also receives some funding from the Regular Budget of the United Nations, which is used mostly for international staffing costs.

== List of camps ==
The camps are divided between five regions:

- Gaza Strip: The Gaza Strip has eight official and no unofficial refugee camps, and 1,221,110 registered refugees.
- West Bank: The West Bank has 19 official and four unofficial refugee camps, and 741,409 registered refugees.
- Syria: Syria has nine official refugee camps and three unofficial refugee camps, and 499,189 registered refugees.
- Lebanon: There are 12 official refugee and no unofficial camps in Lebanon, and 448,599 registered refugees.
- Jordan: There are 10 official and three unofficial refugee camps in Jordan, and 2,034,641 registered refugees.

Name	Founded	Location	Status	Coordinates	Population	Area (km^{2})	Density (pop/km^{2})	Comments	Refs
Yarmouk	1957	Syria	Unofficial	33°28′27″N 36°18′11″E	n.a.	2.1	n.a.	Largely destroyed (was 160,000 population)	
Rafah	1949	Gaza Strip	UNRWA	31°16′58.87″N 34°15′11.52″E	125,304	n.a.	n.a.		
Baqa'a	1968	Jordan	UNRWA	32°04′25″N 35°50′35″E	119,000	1.4	85,000		
Jabalia	1948	Gaza Strip	UNRWA	31°32′20.81″N 34°29′57.63″E	113,990	1.4	81,421		
Khan Yunis	1949	Gaza Strip	UNRWA	31°21′3″N 34°17′18″E	87,816	0.549	159,956		
Al-Shati (Beach camp)	1948	Gaza Strip	UNRWA	31°31′55.91″N 34°26′43.42″E	85,628	0.52	164,669		
Nuseirat	1949	Gaza Strip	UNRWA	31°26′51.56″N 34°23′34.35″E	80,194	n.a.	n.a.		
Ain al-Hilweh	1948	Lebanon	UNRWA	33°32′37″N 35°22′41″E	59,660	0.3	198,867		
Al-Wehdat refugee camp (Amman New Camp)	1955	Jordan	UNRWA	31°55′35″N 35°56′18″E	57,000	0.48	118,750		
Marka	1968	Jordan	UNRWA	32°00′33″N 36°01′14″E	53,000	0.92	57,609		
Jaramana	1948	Syria	UNRWA	33°29′N 36°21′E	49,000	0.03	1,633,333		
Latakia	1955–6	Syria	Unofficial	35°30′28″N 35°47′45″E	47,400	0.22	215,455		
Bureij	1949	Gaza Strip	UNRWA	31°26′22.31″N 34°24′10.58″E	43,330	0.529	81,909		
Rashidieh	1963	Lebanon	UNRWA	33°14′12.12″N 35°13′5.16″E	34,584	0.25	138,336		
Jabal el-Hussein	1952	Jordan	UNRWA	31°57′52″N 35°54′23″E	32,000	0.42	76,190		
Maghazi	1949	Gaza Strip	UNRWA	31°25′16.89″N 34°23′07.35″E	31,329	0.6	52,215		
Jerash	1968	Jordan	UNRWA	32°16′20.21″N 35°53′29.03″E	29,000	0.75	38,667		
Irbid	1951	Jordan	UNRWA	32°33′0″N 35°51′0″E	28,000	0.24	116,667		
Balata	1950	West Bank	UNRWA	32°12′N 35°17′E	27,000	0.25	108,000		
Deir al-Balah	1948	Gaza Strip	UNRWA	31°25′33″N 34°20′26″E	25,569	0.16	159,806		
Husn (Martyr Azmi el-Mufti camp)	1968	Jordan	UNRWA	32°28′30″N 35°54′18″E	25,000	0.77	32,468		
Burj el-Shamali	1955	Lebanon	UNRWA	33°15′47″N 35°14′20″E	24,929	0.134	186,037		
Shu'fat Camp	1965	West Bank	UNRWA	31°48′44″N 35°14′47″E	24,000	0.2	120,000		
Qabr Essit	1967	Syria	UNRWA	33°26′50″N 36°20′10″E	23,700	0.02	1,185,000		
Tulkarm	1950	West Bank	UNRWA	32°18′51″N 35°2′4″E	21,500	0.18	119,444		
Beddawi	1955	Lebanon	UNRWA	34°27′0.64″N 35°52′9.17″E	21,252	0.2	106,260		
Zarqa	1949	Jordan	UNRWA	32°05′N 36°06′E	20,000	0.18	111,111		
Bourj el-Barajneh	1948	Lebanon	UNRWA	33°50′54″N 35°30′12″E	19,539	0.104	187,875		
Souf	1967	Jordan	UNRWA	32°18′30″N 35°53′7.37″E	19,000	0.5	38,000		
Askar	1950	West Bank	UNRWA	32°13′11.51″N 35°17′50.77″E	18,500	0.119	155,462		
Al-Nayrab	1948	Syria	UNRWA	36°10′32″N 37°13′40″E	18,000	0.15	120,000		
Dheisheh	1949	West Bank	UNRWA	31°41′38.47″N 35°11′02.96″E	15,000	0.33	45,455		
Qalandia	1949	West Bank	UNRWA	33°19′55″N 36°19′56″E	14,800	0.42	35,238		
Al-Hassan	1967	Jordan	Unofficial	31°57′27″N 35°58′19″E	14,068	n.a.	n.a.		
Jenin	1953	West Bank	UNRWA	32°27′41″N 35°17′11″E	14,000	0.42	33,333		
Jalazone	1949	West Bank	UNRWA	31°57′07.15″N 35°12′41.58″E	13,000	0.253	51,383		
Al-Sabinah	1948	Syria	UNRWA	33°26′2″N 36°17′8″E	13,000	0.03	433,333		
Homs	1949	Syria	UNRWA	34°42′30.29″N 36°42′26.62″E	13,000	0.15	86,667		
Khan Danoun	1950	Syria	UNRWA	33°19′55″N 36°19′56″E	12,650	0.03	421,667		
El Buss	1948	Lebanon	UNRWA	33°16′21″N 35°12′36″E	12,281	0.08	153,513		
Al-Arroub	1950	West Bank	UNRWA	31°37′23.18″N 35°08′12.19″E	12,000	0.24	50,000		
Khan al-Shih	1949	Syria	UNRWA	33°21′30″N 36°6′26″E	12,000	0.69	17,391		
Shatila	1949	Lebanon	UNRWA	33°51′46″N 35°29′54″E	10,849	0.04	271,225		
Nur Shams	1952	West Bank	UNRWA	32°19′07.36″N 35°03′31.63″E	10,500	0.21	50,000		
Daraa	1950	Syria	UNRWA	32°37′N 36°6′E	10,500	1.3	8,077		
Fawwar	1949	West Bank	UNRWA	31°28′46.45″N 35°03′52.93″E	9,500	0.27	35,185		
Wavel	1948	Lebanon	UNRWA	33°59′56.27″N 36°11′35.46″E	9,460	0.043	220,000		
Hama	1950	Syria	UNRWA	35°08′N 36°45′E	9,000	0.06	150,000		
Aqabat Jaber	1948	West Bank	UNRWA	31°50′17.00″N 35°26′30.20″E	8,600	1.67	5,150		
Madaba Camp	1956	Jordan	Unofficial	31°42′41″N 35°47′15″E	8,597	n.a.	n.a.		
Far'a	1949	West Bank	UNRWA	32°17′38.35″N 35°20′39.74″E	8,500	0.26	32,692		
Talbieh Camp	1968	Jordan	UNRWA	31°42′19″N 35°56′57″E	8,000	0.13	61,538		
Ein Beit al-Ma' (Camp No. 1)	1950	West Bank	UNRWA	32°13′48.91″N 35°14′58.42″E	7,500	0.045	166,667		
Sokhna camp	1969	Jordan	Unofficial	32°7′59″N 36°4′20″E	7,424	n.a.	n.a.	sometimes transliterated 'Sakhna' or 'Sukhna'	
Al-Am'ari	1949	West Bank	UNRWA	31°53′38.60″N 35°12′41.52″E	7,000	0.096	72,917		
Ein Al-Tal (also known as Handarat camp)	1962	Syria	Unofficial	36°17′34.84″N 37°9′24.86″E	n.a.	0.16	n.a.	Largely destroyed (was 7,000 population)	
Nahr al-Bared	1949	Lebanon	UNRWA	34°30′47″N 35°57′40″E	5,857	0.198	29,581	Reconstructed, was 27,000 population	
Mieh Mieh	1954	Lebanon	UNRWA	33°32′30″N 35°23′29″E	5,747	0.054	106,426		
Aida	1950	West Bank	UNRWA	31°43′10.34″N 35°11′56.31″E	5,500	0.071	77,465		
Dbayeh	1956	Lebanon	UNRWA	33°54′N 35°34′E	4,591	0.084	54,655		
Ein es-Sultan camp	1948	West Bank	UNRWA	31°52′40.24″N 35°26′46.24″E	3,800	0.87	4,368		
'Azza (Beit Jibrin)	1950	West Bank	UNRWA	31°42′54.78″N 35°12′07.61″E	2,900	0.027	107,407		
Deir 'Ammar Camp	1949	West Bank	UNRWA	31°57′57.22″N 35°05′55.98″E	2,500	0.162	15,432		
Qaddura camp	1948	West Bank	Unofficial	31°54′3.32″N 35°12′21.18″E	1,558	n.a.	n.a.		
Mar Elias refugee camp	1952	Lebanon	UNRWA	33°52′38″N 35°29′19″E	725	0.0054	134,259		
Silwad Camp	1971	West Bank	Unofficial	31°58′5″N 35°15′41″E	462	n.a.	n.a.		
Abu Shukheidim camp	1948	West Bank	Unofficial		n.a.	n.a.	n.a.	Town of Abu Shukhaydam (sic) shows on maps as ~1 mi SW of Birzeit	
Birzeit camp (As-Saqaeif)	1948	West Bank	Unofficial	31°58′12″N 35°12′01″E	n.a.	n.a.	n.a.		

== Population statistics ==
The evolution of Palestinian refugee population is shown below:

	1950	1960	1970	1980	1990	2000	2004	2009	2018
Jordan	506,200	613,743	506,038	716,372	929,097	1,570,192	1,758,274	1,951,603	2,242,579
Lebanon	127,600	136,561	175,958	226,554	302,049	376,472	396,890	422,188	475,075
Syria	82,194	115,043	158,717	209,362	280,731	383,199	417,346	461,897	560,139
West Bank	–	–	272,692	324,035	414,298	583,009	675,670	762,820	846,465
Gaza Strip	198,227	255,542	311,814	367,995	496,339	824,622	938,531	1,073,303	1,421,282
Total registered refugees	914,221	1,120,889	1,425,219	1,844,318	2,422,514	3,737,494	4,186,711	4,671,811	5,545,540

The number of Palestinian refugees living within the UNWRA registered area of operations is shown below, both those living in camps and those living outside camps:

	Registered persons (refugees and other)	Registered refugees in camps	% registered refugees in camps
1953	870,158	300,785	34.6
1955	912,425	351,532	38.5
1960	1,136,487	409,223	36.0
1965	1,300,117	508,042	39.1
1970	1,445,022	500,985	34.7
1975	1,652,436	551,643	33.4
1980	1,863,162	613,149	32.9
1985	2,119,862	805,482	38.0
1990	2,466,516	697,709	28.3
1995	3,246,044	1,007,375	31.0
2000	3,806,055	1,227,954	32.3
2005	4,283,892	1,265,987	29.6
2010	4,966,664	1,452,790	29.3
2015	5,741,480	1,632,876	28.4
2018	6,171,793	1,728,409	28.0

The table below shows the population of registered refugees, other registered people, and refugees residing in camps, in 2018. UNRWA's definition of Other Registered Persons refer to "those who, at the time of original registration did not satisfy all of UNRWA's Palestine refugee criteria, but who were determined to have suffered significant loss and/or hardship for reasons related to the 1948 conflict in Palestine; they also include persons who belong to the families of other registered persons."

	Jordan	Lebanon	Syria	West Bank	Gaza Strip	Total
Registered refugees	2,242,579	475,075	560,139	846,465	1,421,282	5,545,540
Other registered people	133,902	58,810	83,003	201,525	149,013	626,253
Total registered people	2,376,481	533,885	643,142	1,047,990	1,570,295	6,171,793
Refugees living within official camp borders	412,054	270,614	194,993	256,758	593,990	1,728,409
% living within camp borders	18.4%	57.0%	34.8%	30.3%	41.8%	31.2%

== See also ==
- List of extrajudicial killings and political violence in Lebanon
- Attacks on refugee camps in the Gaza war

== Bibliography ==
- Are Knudsen; Sari Hanafi (5 November 2010). Palestinian Refugees: Identity, Space and Place in the Levan t. Routledge. pp. 3–. ISBN 978-1-136-88334-7.
