= Al-Hassan camp =

Coordinates: 31.9576°N 35.9722°E

The Al-Hassan camp (sometimes 'Prince Hassan Camp') is a Palestinian refugee camp located some 5 Km from the center of Amman, the capital of Jordan. Administratively it lies in the Amman (Capital) Governorate.

It was established in 1967, and a 2021 population estimate indicated that 9,408 people lived there, although a previous estimate (in 2018) had set the number at 14,068.

Palestinian refugee camps are distributed in the Hashemite Kingdom of Jordan across six governorates, amongst which the Capital governorate and Madaba governorate include Al-Wehdat refugee camp, Jabal el-Hussein camp, Prince Hassan, Talbieh Camp and Madaba camp.

Visitors have expressed misgivings about the camp.
