= Bourj el-Barajneh =

Southern suburb of Beirut, Lebanon

Coordinates: 33°50′54″N 35°30′12″E

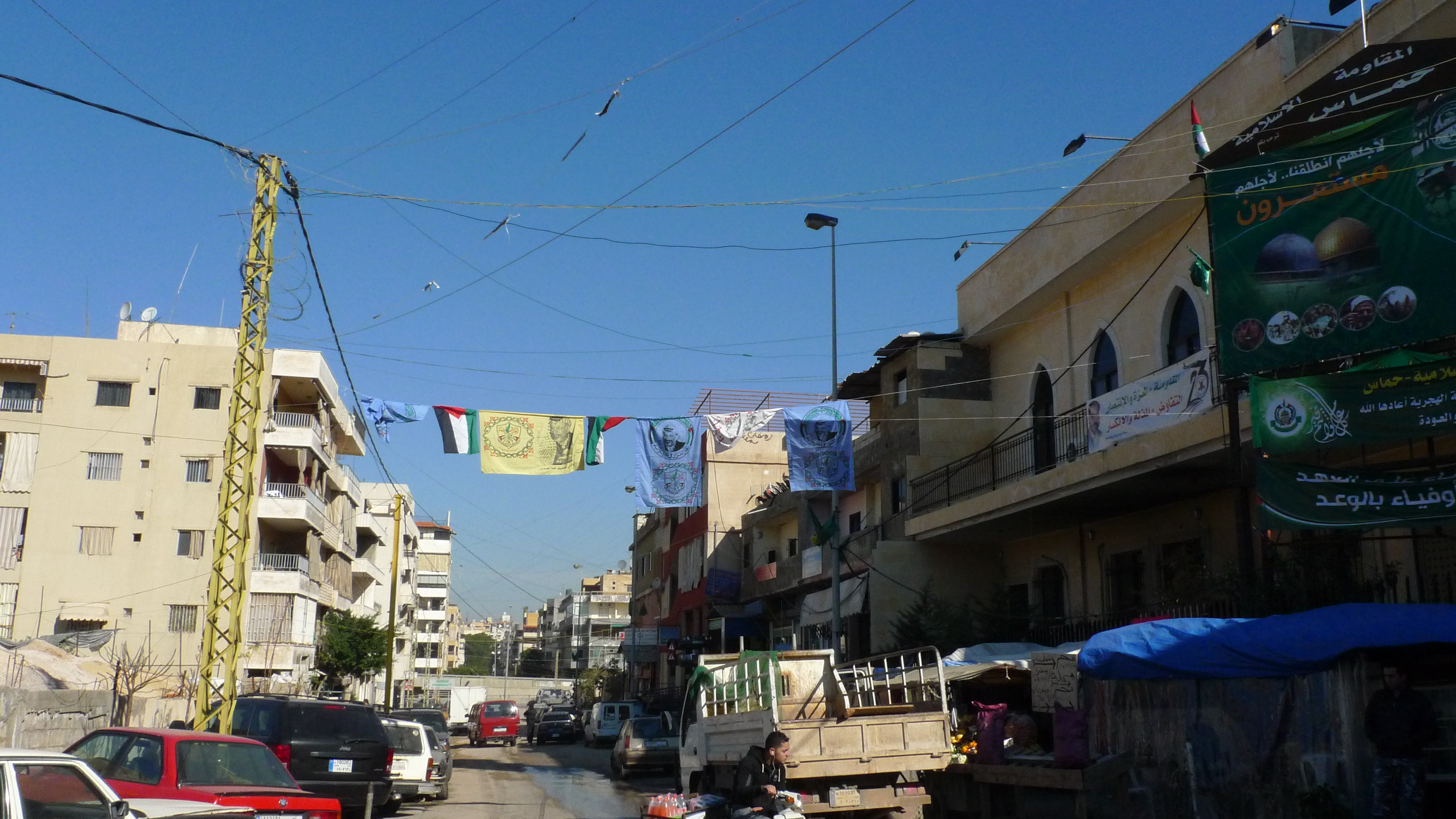
Entrance to the Bourj el-Barajneh refugee camp

Bourj el-Barajneh (Arabic: برج البراجنة, romanized: Burj al-Barājnah, lit. 'Tower of Towers') is a municipality located in the southern suburbs of Beirut, in Lebanon. The municipality lies between Beirut–Rafic Hariri International Airport and the town of Haret Hreik.

In the 7 June 2009 parliamentary election in Lebanon, Bourj al-Barajneh voted in the Baabda electoral division.

Its local population is mainly Lebanese Shia Muslims but due to its cheap housing and hospitable locals, it has acquired a sizable Lebanese Sunni Muslims and some Lebanese Maronite Christian because of its proximity to the town of Haret Hreik, as well as refugee populations like Kurds, Iraqis (including Iraqi Assyrians) and other refugee populations like recently arrived Syrian refugees, who reside mainly in and around the local Palestinian refugee camp; Bourj el-Barajneh. The town was founded by Arab settlers. It is known as the Barajneh after a rebel who killed a slave of Fakhr-al-Din II (1590–1635).

== Refugee camp ==
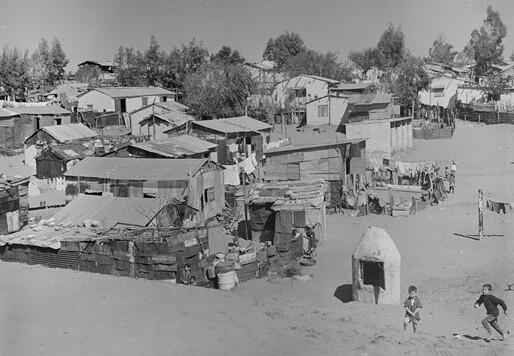
Bourj el-Barajneh refugee camp circa 1967

The Bourj el-Barajneh Refugee camp is located at the edge of the municipality. In October 1948 families from Tarshiha began arriving in Beirut shortly after the conquest by the Israeli army of their village in Western Galilee. The village had been the most prosperous in their district. Initially families lived in rented rooms around Bourj el Barajneh which at that time was a suburb on the fringe of the city. About half of the 3,000 villagers from Tarshiha arriving in Lebanon settled there in what became Bourj el-Barajneh refugee camp, established by the League of Red Cross Societies. Those villagers who were unable to reach Beirut in 1948 were rounded up and sent by train to Aleppo were they became the largest group in al-Neirab Camp. Villagers from Tarshiha took on most of the leadership roles and remained the majority population of Bourj el-Barajneh camp for many years. In 1981 it was estimated 4-5,000 Tarshihans were living in the camp. The camp was laid siege to by the Israeli army and Lebanese Christian Phalangists during 1982, after Israel invaded Lebanon earlier that year. It (and other Palestinian Camps) was also laid siege to by Amal militia from February 1984 to February 1987 for the control of West Beirut. According to UNRWA more than 20,000 Palestinian refugees live in the camp, though originally only 10,000 were planned to live in the one square kilometer site. After the outbreak of the Syrian civil war, many Syrian refugees moved to the camp, dramatically increasing its population. The camp conditions are horrible, and many deaths are recorded every year from electrocution and collapsing buildings.

== November 2015 bombings ==
On 12 November 2015, the town of Bourj el-Barajneh was the scene of twin suicide bombings. At least 37 people were killed and more than 180 were injured. One man, father of two, Adel Termos, threw himself on the second bomber and saved countless lives at the cost of his own.

== Demographics ==
In 2014, Muslims made up 98.18% and Christians made up 1.32% of registered voters in Bourj el-Barajneh. 88.41% of the voters were Shiite Muslims and 9.76% were Sunni Muslims.

== Notable people ==
- Hussein Ezeddine (born 2002), Lebanese footballer
- Ahmad Jalloul (born 1992), Lebanese footballer
- Ali Sabeh (born 1994), Lebanese footballer
- Maher Sabra (born 1992), Lebanese footballer
