= Wavel =

Wavel can refer to:

- Wavel refugee camp, Palestinian refugee camp near Baalbeck, Lebanon
- Wavel Ramkalawan (born 1961), Seychellois politician and Anglican priest
