= Hama camp =

Palestinian refugee camp in Syria

Hama camp is a Palestinian refugee camp in Syria, located in the heart of the city of Hama, which is 200 kilometers north of the Syrian capital Damascus. The camp was established in 1950 on an area of 60,000 square meters, overlooking the Orontes River. Most of the camp's refugees return to villages surrounding the northern Palestinian cities of Haifa and Acre.

The camp is home to more than 8,000 refugees registered with UNRWA.

Most refugees in the camp work either as day labourers or as shop owners. Environmental health is a serious problem in the camp. The issue of solid waste disposal is one of its necessary needs, and its drainage system is characterized by dilobation and does not meet the growing needs.

The camp has four schools: two primary schools (6–12 years old); a school for boys and the other for girls, and two joint primary and preparatory schools; one for boys and the other for girls. These schools are run by UNRWA.
