= Jaramana Camp =

Palestinian refugee camp in Syria

Jaramana Camp جرمانا مخيّم
- District/refugee camp
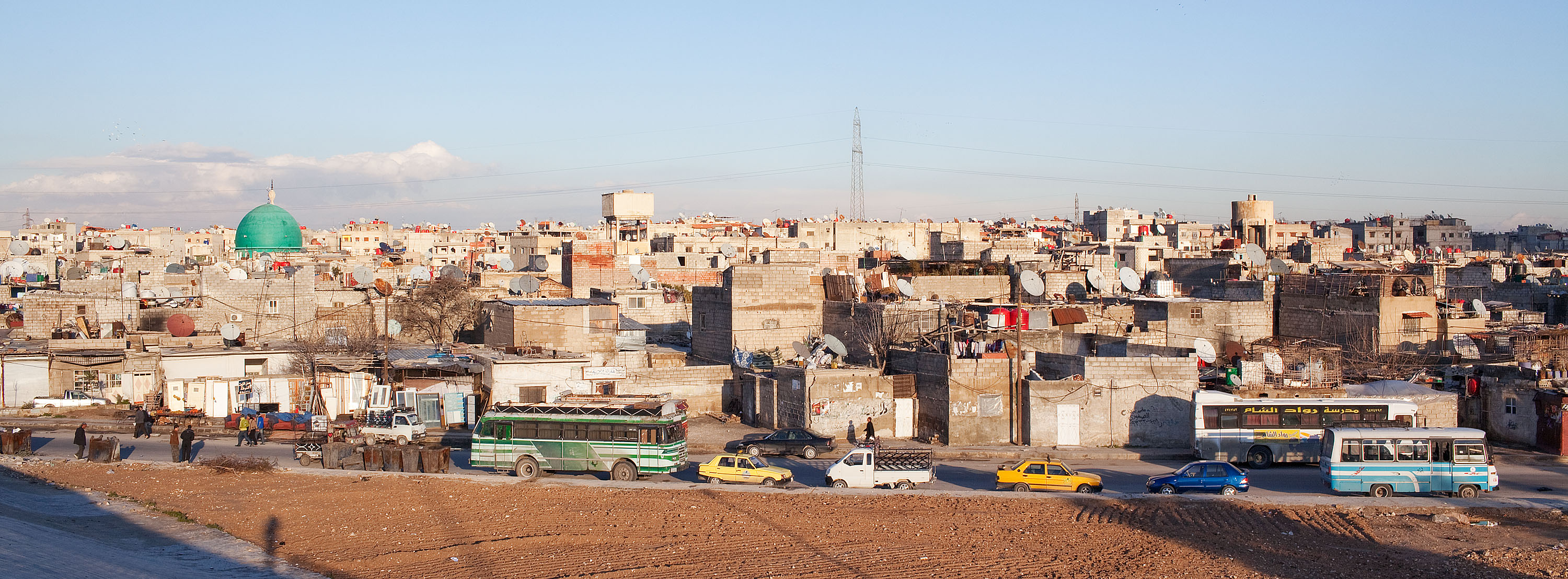
- Skyline including mosque dome

- Location in Syria
- Coordinates: 33°29′N 36°21′E
- Country: Syria
- Governorate: Rif Dimashq
- City: Jaramana
- Established: 1948

Area
  - Total: 0.03 km^{2} (0.012 sq mi)

Population (2019)
  - Total: 49,000

Jaramana Camp (Arabic: مخيم جرمانا) is a 0.03-square-kilometer (7.4-acre) Palestinian refugee camp in the outskirts of the city of Damascus. It is located southeast of the center of Damascus, near the airport road leading to the Damascus International Airport. The camp is a neighborhood in Jaramana.

The camp was initially populated by refugees from the Nakba, and later by Palestinian refugees who had moved to the Golan Heights and were forced from their homes in the 1967 Palestinian exodus. During the Syrian civil war, the population of the camp rose from 18,000 to 49,000 due to an influx of internally displaced Palestinian refugees from other parts of Syria, including the Yarmouk Camp.
