= Ein Beit al-Ma' =

'Ein Beit el Ma
- Refugee Camp

Arabic transcription(s)
  - Arabic: مخيّم رقم1 /عين بيت الماء
  - Latin: No.1 Refugee Camp (official)
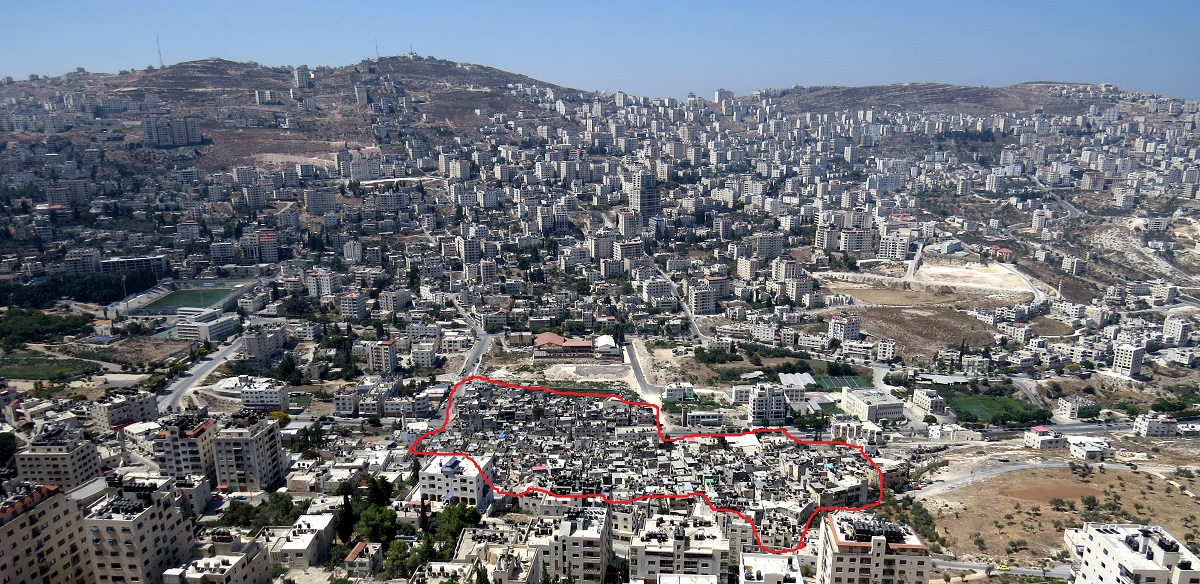
- Al-ein Camp (inside the red line)

- Location of 'Ein Beit el Ma within Palestine
- Coordinates: 32°13′48.91″N 35°14′58.42″E
- State: State of Palestine
- Governorate: Nablus

Government
  - Type: Refugee Camp (from 1950)

Area
  - Total: 0.45 km^{2} (0.17 sq mi)

Population (2017)
  - Total: 3,588
  - Density: 8,000/km^{2} (21,000/sq mi)

'Ein Beit el Ma (Arabic: عين بيت الماء), also known as Camp No. 1 (مخيّم رقم1), is a Palestinian refugee camp established in the northern West Bank in 1950, adjacent to the city of Nablus. According to the Palestinian Central Bureau of Statistics (PCBS), 'Ein Beit el Ma Camp had a population of approximately 3,588 inhabitants in 2017.

The United Nations Relief and Works Agency for Palestine Refugees in the Near East (UNRWA) supports two schools built with funds from the Saudi Arabia and Swedish Governments in 1997, close to the 'Ein Beit el Ma camp, on land donated by the Nablus municipality. The schools have approximately 1,268 pupils.

'Ein Beit el Ma, (No.1) Refugee Camp, west of Nablus city was established in 1950 on 45 dunums beside the main Nablus/Jenin road, and within the municipal boundaries of Nablus. Following the Israeli redeployment in 1995, the camp fell under Palestinian Authority control in "Area A". The camp is very cramped, there is serious overcrowding, and the narrow alleys are in desperate need of repair. During funerals, the deceased are usually passed through windows from one shelter to another in order to reach the camp's main street.

A serious outbreak of diarrhoea hospitalised several hundred camp residents in the summer of 1998. Contaminated municipal water supplies was the cause of the epidemic and UNRWA's health staff worked day and night to treat the sick and to take patients to clinics and hospitals in other parts of the West Bank.

18 September 2007, Israeli Defense Forces (IDF) and Border Police entered 'Ein Beit el Ma Refugee Camp. The entire camp population of approximately 5,000 people was placed under complete curfew for three days. The IDF entered the camp with the stated aim of disarming militant cells in the camp. After initial clashes between IDF troops and Palestinian residents inside the camp, the IDF began house-to-house search and an arrest campaign.

Over the course of the three days there were two Palestinian fatalities and 25 injuries reported, including two children and one woman. In addition, one IDF soldier was killed and five were injured including 4 soldiers who were injured when a tear gas canister exploded prematurely inside their armoured vehicle.
