= Jerash camp =

Jerash Camp مخيم جرش
- Refugee camp
- Location in Jordan
- Coordinates: 32°16′20.21″N 35°53′29.03″E
- Country: Jordan
- Governorate: Amman Governorate
- Established: 1968

Area
  - Total: 0.75 km^{2} (0.29 sq mi)

Population (2019)
  - Total: 29,000
- Time zone: UTC+2 (Eastern European Standard Time)
  - Summer (DST): UTC+3 (Arabia Standard Time)

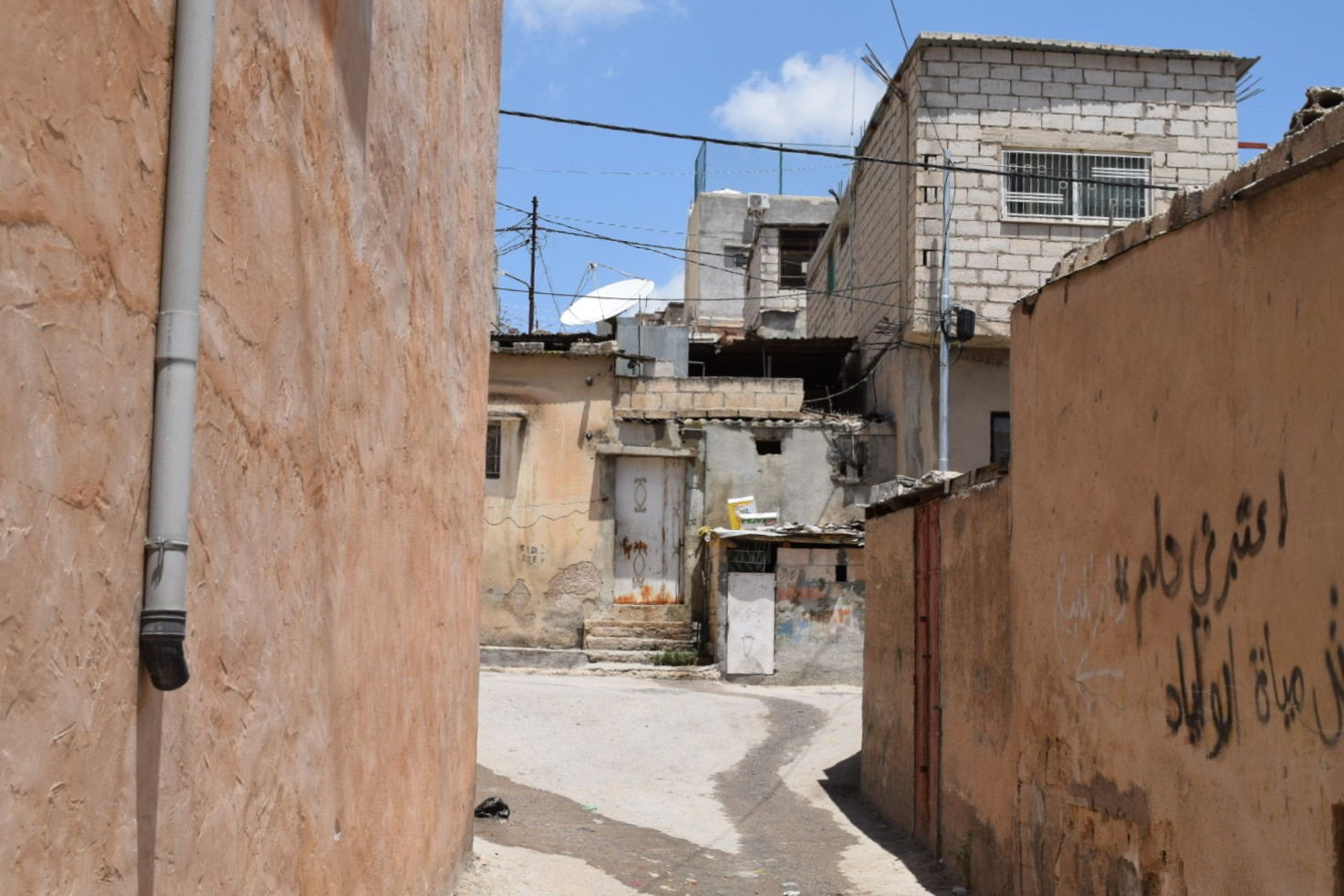
Residential alley in Jerash camp

Jerash camp (Arabic: مخيم جرش), known locally as Gaza camp, is one of the ten officially recognized UNRWA Palestinian refugee camps in Jordan. It is located five kilometres from the Roman ruins of Jerash.

It was originally founded in 1968 as an "emergency" camp following the 1967 Palestinian exodus. In the beginning, the camp only existed out of tent encampments. Because of the unexpected period of Palestinian displacement and the enterprise of camp residents, the camp's construction has been merely ad hoc.
