= Bourj el-Barajneh refugee camp =

Bourj el-Barajneh refugee camp مخيم برج البراجنة
- Refugee camp
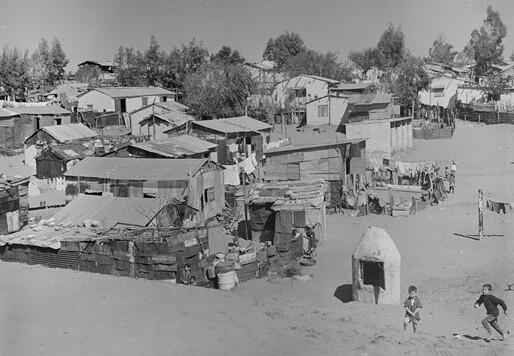
- Bourj el-Barajneh refugee camp circa 1967
- Interactive map of Bourj el-Barajneh refugee camp
- Coordinates: 33.8456°N 35.5042°E
- Country: Lebanon
- City: Beirut
- Neighborhood: Bourj el-Barajneh
- Established: 1948
- Founder: Union of Red Cross Societies

Government
  - Type: Administered by UNRWA
  - Body: UNRWA

Population (2024)
  - Total: 58,000
- 18,000 Palestinian refugees and 40,000 Syrian refugees
- Time zone: UTC+2 (EET)
  - Summer (DST): UTC+3 (EEST)
- Website: UNRWA page

Bourj el-Barajneh refugee camp (Arabic: مخيم برج البراجنة, romanized: Mukhayyam Burj al-Barajina) is a refugee camp in the Beirut neighbourhood of Bourj el-Barajneh, Lebanon. The camp was established by the Union of Red Cross Societies in 1948 to house Palestinian refugees displaced in the 1948 Palestinian expulsion. The camp was partially destroyed during the 1982 Israeli invasion of Lebanon and the Lebanese civil war.

As of 2024 the camp is home to 18,000 Palestinians and 40,000 Syrians displaced by the Syrian civil war.

== See also ==
- Palestinian refugee camps
