= Dbayeh camp =

Dbayeh camp (Arabic: مخيم ضبية, romanized: Mukhayyam Dabia) is a Palestinian refugee camp located next to Dbayeh, 12 kilometers east of the city of Beirut on a hill overlooking the highway connecting Beirut and Tripoli.

The camp was established in 1956 with the aim of sheltering Palestinian refugees who came from the Galilee area in northern Palestine, especially from Al-Bassa, and some families from Kfar Baram, Iqrit, Haifa and Acre, most of whom are Christians. There are currently more than 4,000 refugees living in the camp.

Because of its strategic location, the camp suffered a lot of violence during the Lebanese Civil War. 70 of the people of the camp were executed in 1976 by the Phalange Party and its associates. In 1990, a quarter of its homes were destroyed or severely damaged while more than 100 families living in it, most of them Christian Palestinian refugees, were displaced. It is the only remaining Palestinian refugee camp in the eastern suburbs of Beirut. The camp's infrastructure is currently undergoing extensive rehabilitation work.
