= Deir 'Ammar Camp =

Deir Ammar Camp
- Refugee Camp

Arabic transcription(s)
  - Arabic: مخيّم دير عمّار
- Location of Deir Ammar Camp within Palestine
- Coordinates: 31°57′57.22″N 35°05′55.98″E
- State: State of Palestine
- Governorate: Ramallah and al-Bireh

Government
  - Type: Refugee Camp

Area
  - Total: 145 dunams (14.5 ha; 36 acres)

Population (2017)
  - Total: 1,884
  - Density: 13,000/km^{2} (33,700/sq mi)

Deir Ammar Camp (Arabic: مخيّم دير عمّار) is a Palestinian refugee camp located in the Ramallah and al-Bireh Governorate, approximately 30 kilometers (19 mi) northwest of Ramallah in the northern West Bank. According to the Palestinian Central Bureau of Statistics (PCBS), the camp had a population of 1,884 inhabitants in 2017.

Established in 1949, the camp was set up on land previously owned by non-refugee residents of the village of Deir Ammar. In return, UNRWA's facilities in the camp also provide services to the non-refugee villagers. The camp falls under joint Israeli-Palestinian control in "Area B". The refugee camp has two schools: the boys' school which has 680 pupils, and the girls' school which has 735 pupils.
