= Irbid Camp =

Irbid Camp مخيم إربد
- Refugee camp
- Location in Jordan
- Coordinates: 32°33′N 35°51′E
- Country: Jordan
- Governorate: Irbid Governorate
- Established: 1951

Area
  - Total: 0.24 km^{2} (0.093 sq mi)

Population (2019)
  - Total: 29,000
- Time zone: UTC+2 (Eastern European Standard Time)
  - Summer (DST): UTC+3 (Arabia Standard Time)

Irbid Camp (Arabic: مخيم إربد) is one of the 10 officially recognized UNRWA Palestinian refugee camps in Jordan. It is located outside of Irbid.

It was one of the four camps founded in Jordan to accommodate the refugees of the 1948 Palestinian expulsion and flight, the others being Jabal el-Hussein camp, Al-Wehdat refugee camp and Zarqa Camp.
