= Birzeit camp =

Coordinates: 31°58′12″N 35°12′01″E

Birzeit camp is a Palestinian refugee camp established in 1948. It is located on both sides of a street in the center of the town of Birzeit in the Ramallah and Al-Bireh Governorate. Until now, the camp has not been recognized by the United Nations refugee agency UNRWA.

== Historical overview ==
Birzeit camp was established in 1948 in the town of Birzeit, located seven kilometers north of Ramallah, on an area of 23 dunams located on both sides of a street in the center of the city. Over time, the camp's area has shrunk to only 6 dunams.

== Demographics ==
The population of Birzeit camp, when it was established in 1948, was estimated at 8,000 people. This number began to shrink due to the displacement of residents to neighboring towns or within the village of Birzeit, and the shrinkage of the camp's land area, in addition to the failure of the Refugee Relief Organization to recognize the camp, until in 1967 the population was only 86 people. The camp's population in 2010, according to statistics from the Palestinian Central Bureau of Statistics, was only about 180 people.

The demographic composition of the population of Birzeit camp consisted of residents of a number of Palestinian villages displaced in 1948, such as the villages of Kafarana, Abbasiya, Salamah, Beit Nabala, Al-Masmiyeh, Lod, Abu Shusha, and Quliya. At first, the refugees lived in tents, then they built small houses of stone and mud and roofed them with zinc boards. They were accustomed to paying symbolic rents to the landowner in exchange for their housing and use of the camp land, but with the passage of time the area of available land shrank. As it approached the point where it was no longer sufficient to accommodate the families inhabiting the camp, most of the refugees who lived in the camp have rented houses outside the camp or moved to other camps such as Al-Amari Camp, Al-Jalazoun Camp, and Aqabat Jabr Camp. Some of them were also displaced to other countries outside the Palestinian territories, such as Jordan, due to the limited and insufficient space of the camp, with many of the camp's residents unable to build a room or a place to live.

According to the statement of the head of the popular committee in the camp, Nasser Sharaya, the camp currently consists of forty-five independent buildings containing sixty-five residential apartments.

== Services ==
The residents of Birzeit camp benefit from the services available in the town of Birzeit. They obtain water from the Jerusalem Water Company, and electricity from the town of Birzeit reaches about 15 homes in the camp, but there are up to five homes that do not have access to electricity. Waste collection service is available to camp residents, and Birzeit camp also contains a nutrition center for refugees, about 200 meters away from the camp.

== Health status ==
There are no health services available inside the camp, forcing the camp residents to use the health center of the neighboring Jalazone camp, which is about three kilometers south of Birzeit camp, when they need to obtain treatment and medical services.

== Education ==
In the 1950s, the Refugee Relief Organization (UNRWA) established a basic school for girls to serve the residents of Birzeit camp. The school consisted of two rooms that UNRWA rented from the residents. This remained the case until an official girls’ school was built in the town of Birzeit to serve the camp residents and all refugees in the town. Male students go to outside schools.

== International recognition of the camp ==
Birzeit camp is still not officially recognized by the United Nations Refugee Relief Agency (UNRWA), nor is it listed with the ministries and departments of the Palestinian Authority government. This increases the difficulty of accessing accurate official digital information about the camp's area, population numbers and origins when the camp was established.
