= 2015 Beirut bombings =

Suicide bombings in Beirut, Lebanon

- Part of the Syrian civil war spillover in Lebanon
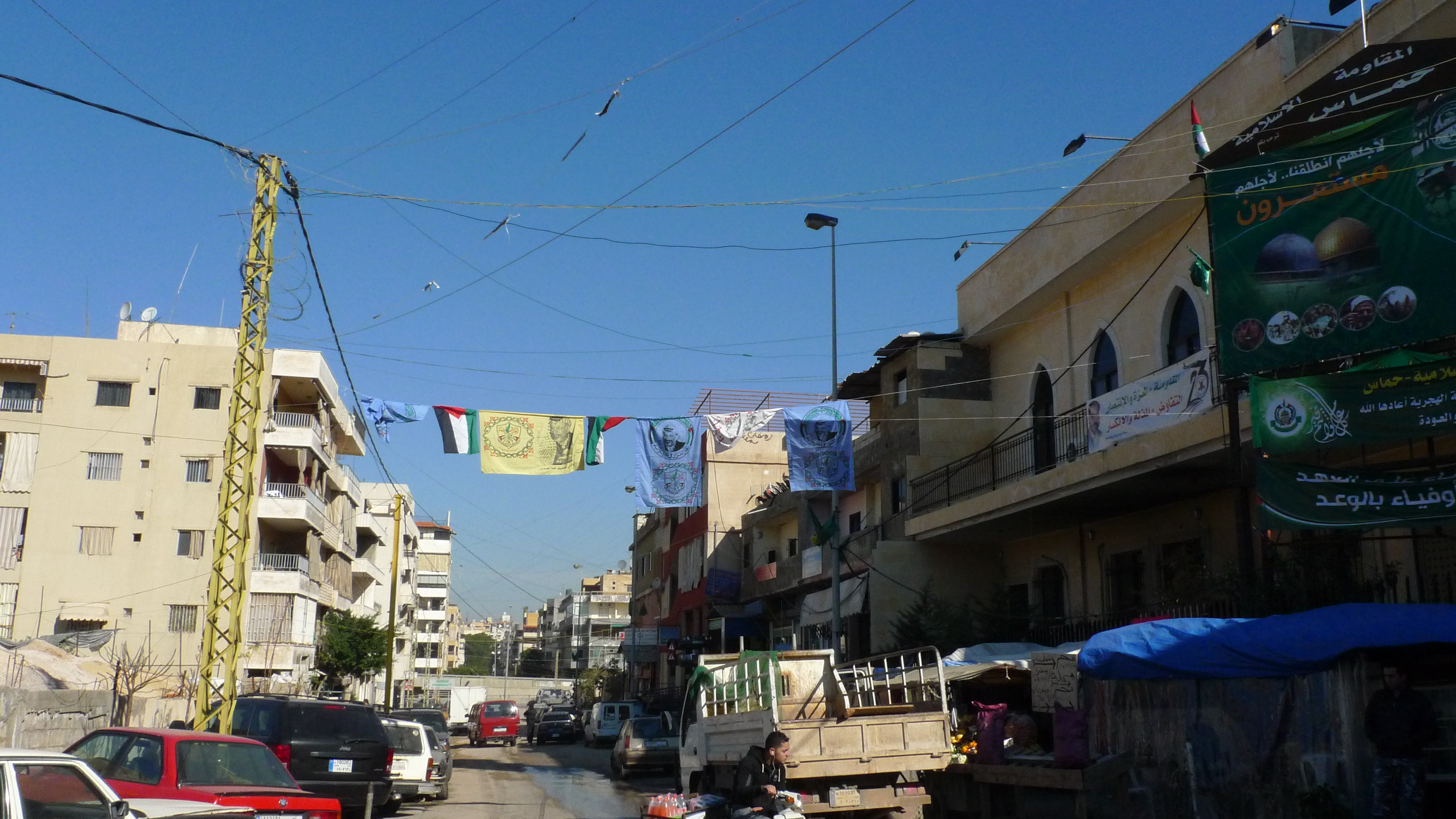
- Bourj el-Barajneh entrance in the Palestinian refugee camp

- Location: Bourj el-Barajneh, Beirut, Lebanon
- Date: 12 November 2015
- Target: Shia civilians
- Attack type: Suicide attacks
- Deaths: 46 (Including 3 perpetrators)
- Injuries: 200–240
- Perpetrator: ISIS

On 12 November 2015, two suicide bombers attacked Bourj el-Barajneh, a southern suburb of Beirut, Lebanon, that is inhabited mostly by Shia Muslims. Reports of the number of fatalities concluded that 43 people died directly from the detonation. Islamic State of Iraq and the Levant (ISIL) claimed responsibility for the attacks.

The bombings were the worst terrorist attack in Beirut since the end of the Lebanese Civil War. They came twelve days after the bombing of a Russian airliner over the Sinai Peninsula that killed 224 people and a day before attacks in Paris that killed 137. ISIL claimed responsibility for these attacks as well.

Around 48 hours after the attack, Internal Security Forces arrested eleven people, mostly Syrians, over the attack. It later announced the arrest of two other Syrian and Lebanese suspects. They were arrested in a Palestinian refugee camp located in Burj al-Barajneh and a flat in the capital's eastern district of Achrafieh, which had allegedly been used to prepare the explosive belts. The initial plan was apparently to send five suicide bombers to a hospital in the neighbourhood, but heavy security forced them to change the target to a densely populated area.

== Background ==
Since 2011 the neighbouring country of Syria had been in a state of civil war. Shortly after its commencement, Lebanese groups separated along similar lines to those in Syria, including participating in the war (such as Hezbollah involvement in Syria), as well as defending Lebanon from within the country. Lebanon also faced a political vacuum due to a continual failure to elect a new president (which is a requisite for a parliamentary election) since April 2014.

== Bombings ==
Two suicide bombings occurred in a commercial district of the Bourj el-Barajneh suburb of Southern Beirut, near the General Security Post in Hussaineya street, an apparent known stronghold of the Shia Hezbollah, according to al-Manar television, The first bombing occurred outside a Shia mosque, while the second took place inside a nearby bakery before 18:00. The second blast occurred about 20 metres away and five to seven minutes after the first one as passers-by tried to help the injured of the initial blast. A potential third attacker was killed before exploding his vest. He was found dead with his legs torn off but still wearing an explosives belt, according to an unnamed Lebanese security official. An unnamed government employee deduced that he was killed by the second explosion due to his proximity to that blast. Al Mayadeen also reported about the would-be bomber and showed a video of a bearded young man with an explosives belt. Hezbollah's Bilal Farhat said: "They targeted civilians, worshippers, unarmed people, women and elderly, they only targeted innocent people ... [it was a] satanic, terrorist attack." Lebanese security forces and Hezbollah gunmen cordoned off the area.

The Health Ministry reported at least 43 deaths initially, with Health Minister Wael Abu Faour adding that 239 people were injured, but that the total casualty count was expected to rise due to some of the wounded people being in critical condition. Lebanon's International Red Cross and Red Crescent Society affiliate said that over 200 people were injured. Hospitals in the area called for people to donate blood due to an unprecedented number of casualties. Emergency services personnel asked by-standers to leave the area as they were hindering ambulances from ferrying the injured to medical institutions.

=== Victims ===
Amongst the initial casualties were two staff members of the American University of Beirut, according to the school, although no further details were announced. Three Lebanese-American residents of Dearborn, Michigan—a 49-year-old woman and a young couple—were killed, while the couple's three-year-old son was severely injured.

Hajj Hussein Yaari (Abu Murdata), a senior figure in the Hezbollah security system, was reportedly killed in the attack.

It was reported that one of the bombs exploded when Adel Termos, a resident of Beirut, tackled one of the bombers, thereby potentially saving many lives. Both Termos and the bomber were killed when the bomb detonated. On social media, Termos was hailed as a hero.

== Investigation ==
Within two days, six suspects were arrested over the bombing. They reportedly included five Syrians and a Palestinian. Hassan Nasrallah, Lebanon's Hezbollah leader, said Syrian and Lebanese detainees were arrested on suspicion of being involved in the bombings.

A man was arrested who claimed he planned to blow himself up in a café in the Jabal Mohsen neighbourhood of Tripoli, simultaneously with the other bombers, one of whom he named as Abou Khaled of Palestine, who had travelled with him to Lebanon from Syria. Investigations also drew connections between these bombings and one in Arsal which killed four people on November 5.

== Perpetrator ==
ISIL had reportedly assumed responsibility for the blasts, saying two Palestinians and a Syrian had carried out the attacks. In a post from an unspecified Twitter account, the group said that they perpetrated one of the attacks, noting that its agents blew up a bike with explosives in the middle of a street. While not mentioning the third bomber, the group's claim, as translated, reportedly read in part: "Let the Shiite apostates know that we will not rest until we take revenge in the name of the Prophet." An internet statement on an unspecified site reportedly further stated the "soldiers of the Caliphate" perpetrated the attack.

On November 26, Al-Manar reported that a team of Syrian and Hezbollah agents had killed Abdul-Salam Hendawi, suspected of smuggling the two bombers into Lebanon from Raqqa, during an assault in Homs Governorate. It did not report when this took place.

== Reactions ==
=== Domestic ===
Acting President and Prime Minister Tammam Salam declared a day of national mourning for 13 November. He said the bombings were "unjustifiable," and called for government unity against "plans to create strife" in the country. Interior Minister Nouhad Machnouk echoed the condemnation and added "we will not be lenient in apprehending those behind these attacks."

Loyalty to the Resistance Bloc's Secretary-General Hassan Nasrallah's assistant, Hussein Khalil, said: "What happened here is a crime...this battle against terrorists will continue and it is a long war between us." Nasrallah himself later said that such incidents only increase "our determination to fight" in the Syrian Civil War and that the goal of the attack "is to put pressure on Hezbollah [to withdraw from Syria], but they know very well these bombings will not benefit them at all. This will have the opposite effect."

=== International ===
==== Supranational bodies ====
Secretary-General of the United Nations Ban Ki-moon called on Lebanon to "not allow this despicable act to destroy the relative calm that has prevailed in the country over the past year." UN Special Coordinator for Lebanon Sigrid Kaag denounced the "heinous attack," called for those responsible to be brought to justice and said the international community was standing by Lebanon.

==== States ====
Government officials for several states issued condemnations of the attacks and condolences to those affected. These included the Czech Republic, France, Iran, Italy, Jordan, Kuwait, Pakistan, Qatar, and the United States.

==== Others ====
Amnesty International issues a censure saying that the attack revealed "appalling disregard for human life."

== See also ==
- List of terrorist incidents, 2015
