= Dbayeh =

Dbayeh ضبية
- City
- Location in Lebanon
- Coordinates: 33°56′07″N 35°35′23″E
- Country: Lebanon
- Governorate: Mount Lebanon
- District: Matn
- Highest elevation: 100 m (330 ft)
- Lowest elevation: 0 m (0 ft)

Population
  - Total: 18,000
- Time zone: UTC+2 (EET)
  - Summer (DST): UTC+3 (EEST)
- Dialing code: +961
- Website: www.dawlati.gov.lb/en/directory-detail/-/asset_publisher/x28bFmDP0Kyx/content/municipality-of-dbayeh-zouk-al-khrab-haret-al-ballaneh-aoukar

Dbayeh (Arabic: ضبية) is a city in Lebanon located on the Mediterranean Sea in the Matn District, Mount Lebanon, between Beirut and Jounieh. Its inhabitants are almost predominantly Maronite Catholic, with a significant minority of Melkites.

In February 1990 Dbayyeh was the scene of wide spread artillery exchanges and street fighting in an offensive launched by General Aoun against Samir Geagea’s Lebanese Forces (LF) in East Beirut. Dbayeh was captured by Aoun’s soldiers on 6 February, half way through the two weeks of fighting in which 500 people were killed and 2000 wounded.

The city recently became a hub for shopping and entertainment with its numerous shopping malls, restaurants and cinemas as well as a leisure port and a residential waterfront project.

Dbayeh refugee camp was established in 1952 for Palestinian Christian refugees from Bassa and Kafr Berem.

== Notable places ==
- ABC Dbayeh department store and shopping mall
- LeMall Dbayeh

The Village Dbayeh

- MTV Headquarters
- Waterfront City Dbayeh
- Aishti by the Sea
- La Marina Club
