= Zarqa Camp =

Zarqa Camp مخيم الزرقاء
- Refugee camp
- Location in Jordan
- Coordinates: 32°05′N 36°06′E
- Country: Jordan
- Governorate: Zarqa Governorate
- Established: 1949

Area
  - Total: 0.18 km^{2} (0.069 sq mi)

Population (2019)
  - Total: 20,000
- Time zone: UTC+2 (Eastern European Standard Time)
  - Summer (DST): UTC+3 (Arabia Standard Time)

Zarqa Camp (Arabic: مخيم الزرقاء) is one of the 10 officially recognized UNRWA Palestinian refugee camps in Jordan. It is located outside of Zarqa.

It was the first Palestine refugee camp to be established in Jordan, in 1949, and one of the four camps founded to accommodate the refugees of the 1948 Palestinian expulsion and flight. The others were Irbid camp, Al-Wehdat refugee camp and Jabal el-Hussein camp. When it was founded, it housed 8,000 refugees in an area of 0.18 square kilometers. Although the camp initially consisted of tents, UNRWA eventually replaced these with concrete shelters. As of 2013, 19% of Palestine refugees in the camp were below Jordan's national poverty line, 15% suffered from chronic health problems, and 68% were uninsured.

Over time, camp residents moved to other parts of Zarqa city, and what had initially been a separate refugee camp has now become part of Zarqa city itself, sharing the same municipal services.
