= Ras Khamis =

Neighborhood in East Jerusalem

- Interactive map of Ras Khamis
- Coordinates: 31.8131509°N 35.2428936°E

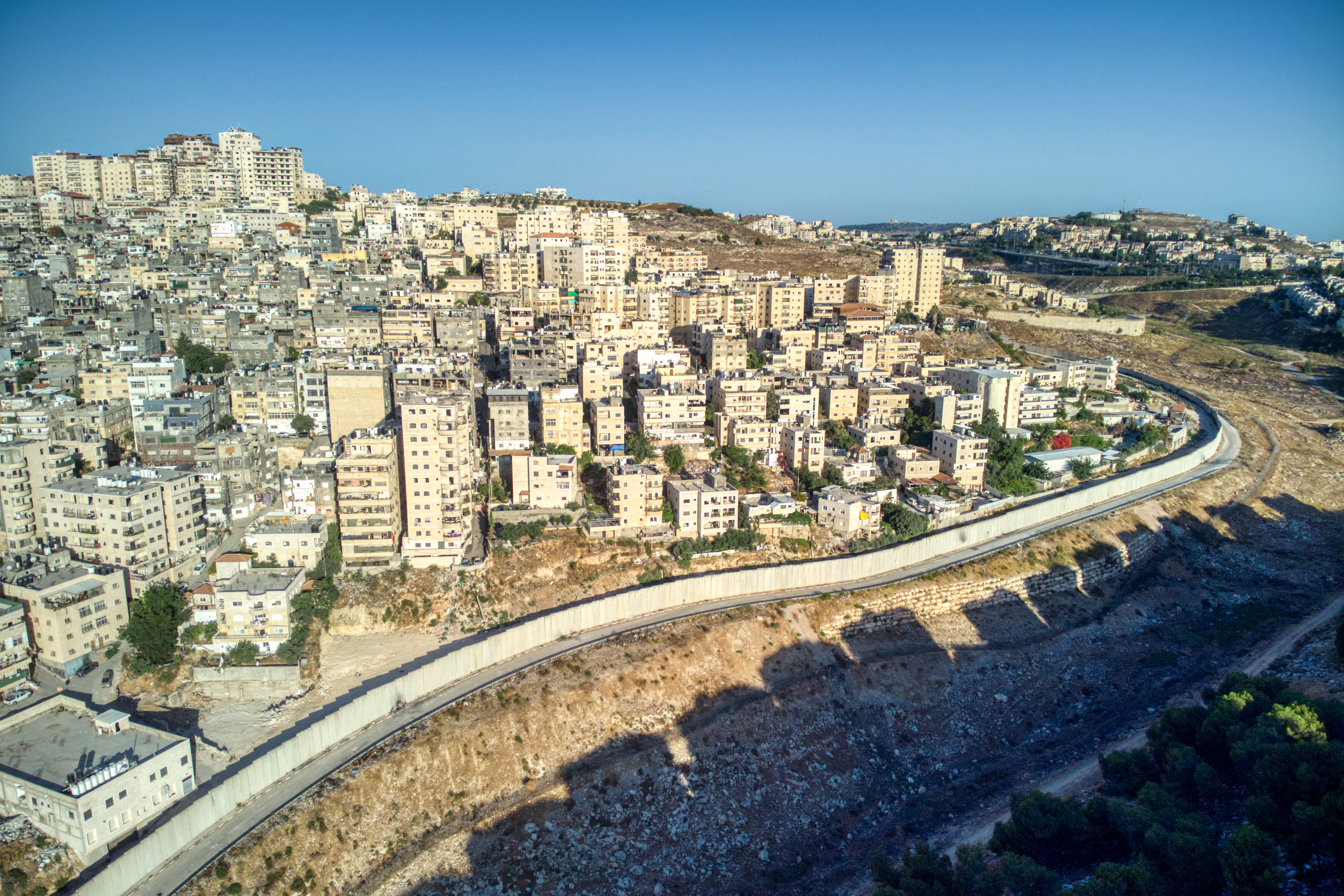
Ras Khamis

Ras Khamis (Arabic: رأس خميس, romanized: Raʿs Khamīs) is a neighborhood in East Jerusalem. In 2007, construction of the Israeli West Bank Barrier cut off Ras Khamis from the rest of East Jerusalem, with the barrier completed in 2010. Presently, access to the rest of the city is via a single checkpoint. Subsequently, in 2012, municipal services such as urban planning, utilities, police and fire services, and garbage were discontinued in Ras Khamis and other neighborhoods that were separated by the barrier from the rest of the city. However, as the land was still claimed by Israel, the Palestinian Authority did not provide government services either.

Due to the housing shortage in the region, many high rise apartment buildings have been constructed in Ras Khamis, which as of 2014 is estimated to have a population of 20,000. The buildings are not approved by city planning and many have been threatened with demolition.

== See also ==
- East Jerusalem
- Kowloon Walled City, a similar neighborhood in Hong Kong that existed from 1947 to 1992.
