= Al-Wehdat refugee camp =

Refugee camp in Amman, Jordan

Al-Wehdat camp مخيم الوحدات
- Refugee camp
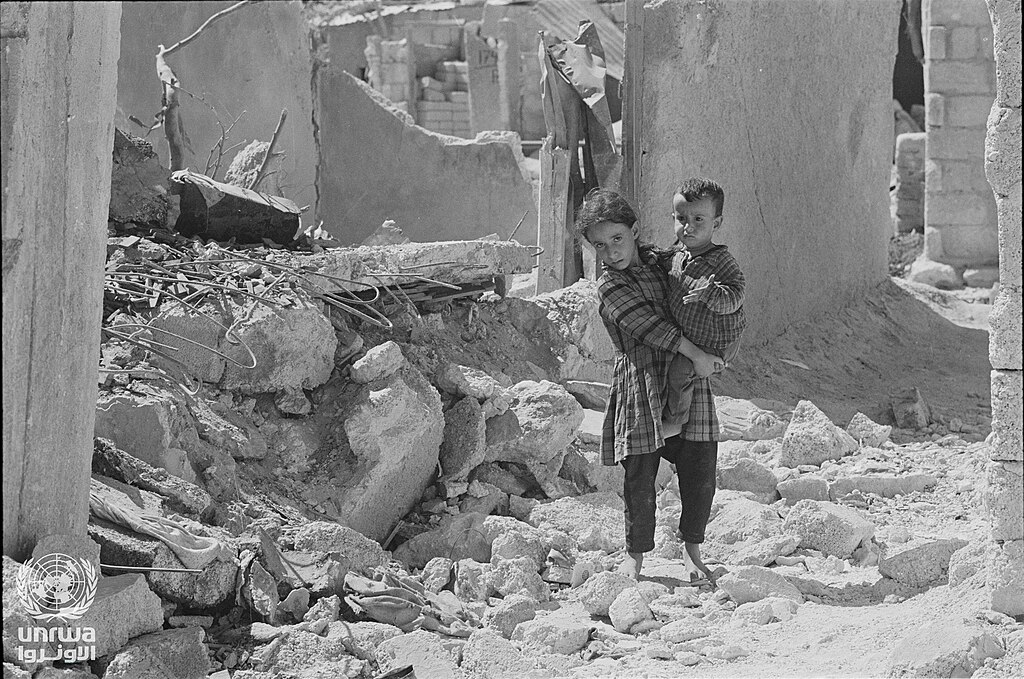
- The camp in 1970, damaged from the Black September conflict

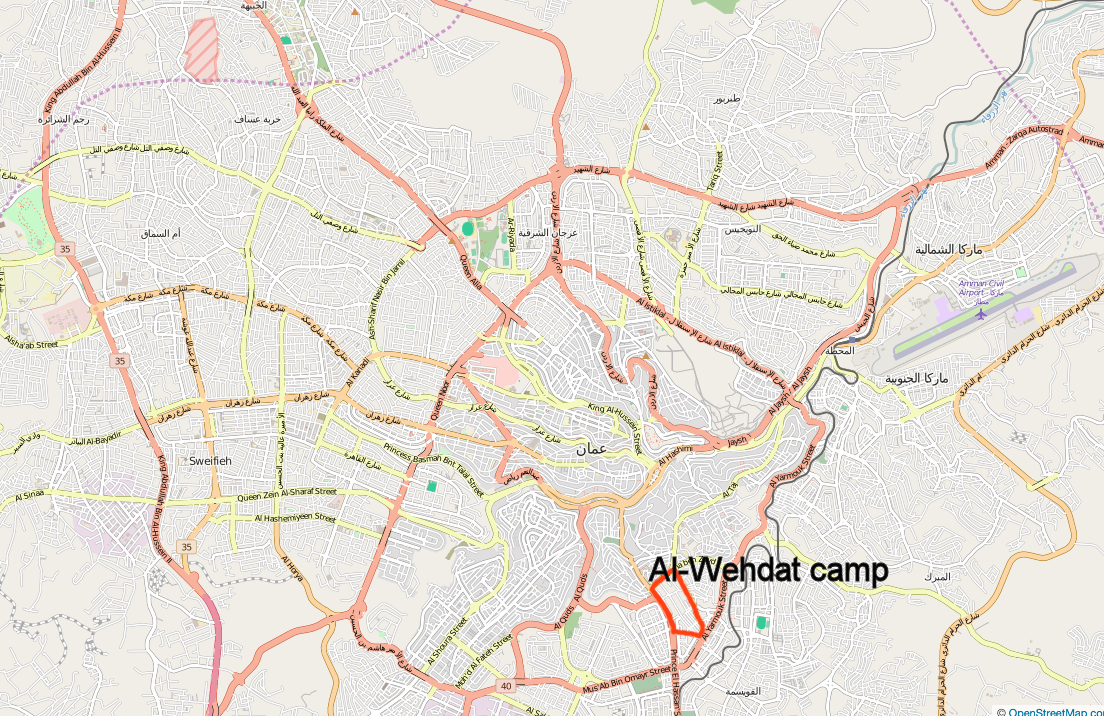
- Al-Wehdat camp Hay Al Awdah Amman Jordan
- Coordinates: 31°55′35″N 35°56′18″E
- Country: Jordan
- City: Amman

Amman New Camp, usually known as the Al-Wehdat or Al-Wihdat camp (Arabic: مخيم الوحدات, romanized: mukhayyam al-Wiḥdāt), which is located in the Hay Al Awdah neighbourhood in southeast Amman, the capital city of Jordan, occupies a 0.48 km^{2} (0.19 sq mi). Of the ten recognized Palestinian refugee camps in Jordan, Al-Wehdat is the second largest, with a population of roughly 57,000 registered refugees, which includes 8,400 students. The United Nation body responsible for administrating Palestinian refugee camps, is the Relief and Works Agency for Palestinian Refugees in the Near East (UNRWA).

== Administration ==
In 2010, Al-Wihdat was a part of Al-'Awd ("The Return") quarter of the Al-Yarmouk district of Amman.

== History ==
In the 1960s, 1970s and 1980s Al-Wihdat was synonymous with 'Palestinian' in public life; protest actions, demonstrations, petitions and even Al-Wihdat soccer club's matches were all indicators.

— Ala Hamarneh PhD. 2010. Space and Architecture

Al-Widhat was one of four refugee camps set up by UNWRA to accommodate Palestine refugees who left Mandatory Palestine following the 1948 Arab–Israeli War, along with Irbid camp, Jabal el-Hussein camp and Zarqa Camp. It was established in 1955 with the arrival of 5,000 refugees from villages between Jaffa and Jerusalem. At first refugees lived in tents. In 1957, UNWRA built 1,260 shelters to add to the 1,400 shelters they initially built on an area of 0.48 km^{2} (0.19 sq mi), south of the outskirts of Amman at the time.

For almost fifteen years, until the 1970s most families were living in shelters and tents.

After the Black September conflicts which lasted from 1970 to 1971, UNRWA worked with the Jordanian government to improve living conditions in Al-Widhat.

In 1987-88, 17 percent of households in Wihdat lived in one-room dwellings, compared to 6 percent by 2011. By 2011, 44 percent of households in Wihdat lived in two room-dwellings. In terms of crowding, Fafo Foundation (FAFO) uses the square metre per capita, with Wihdat as one of the "lowest median per capita square metres of living space."

During the late 1960s, 1970s and 1980s, Al-Wihdat in Jordan became a center of activity for Palestinian nationalists. Even the Al-Wihdat soccer club's matches were synonymous with the 'Palestinian' identity in public life."

The eastern quarters of Al-Wihdat developed a low-middle class housing areas with three- and four-storied buildings. There were slum-like areas in the southern quarters of the camp.

The camp, which is not enclosed by walls or fences, was an open space with a thriving economic area. Although there are several main roads in the camp, it is crisscrossed with "narrow passageways and twisting alleys." The eastern quarters of Al-Wihdat developed a low-middle class housing areas with three- and four-storied buildings. There were slum-like areas in the southern quarters of the camp, where heavy stones anchored zinc roofs.

By the late 2000s, there were over 2,000 registered "shops and enterprises" offering a wide variety of goods and services operating in Al-Wehdat. The large souk in Al Wehdat attracted customers from outside the camp with its wide variety of goods, such as vegetables from the Jordan Valley, and clothing from China, offered at lower prices than other markets in Amman.

== Demographics ==
By 2010, there were 48,000 inhabitants which included about "8,000 local gypsies, Egyptian labor migrants, Iraqi refugees and other low-income non-Jordanian groups." By 2017, there were about 57,000 registered refugees, which includes 8,400 students in Al-Wihdat and almost 370,000 Palestine refugees in Jordan, which represents 18 per cent of Jordan's total. Jordan accommodates the most Palestine refugees of all of the UNWRA locations. In Jordan, most, but not all, Palestine refugees have full citizenship. By 2017, of the 5 million registered Palestinian refugees in Jordan, Syria, Lebanon, the West Bank and Gaza, 2 million were in Jordan.

== UNRWA ==
UNRWA, which was established in 1949, provides funding for Palestine refugees to have access to education, "primary health care for more than 3.5 million patients and assistance to over 250,000 acutely vulnerable Palestine refugees." UNRWA services in Al-Wehdat includes 13 schools, a health center, a rehabilitation center, a women's programme center, an environmental health office and a camp services office. UNWRA also ran a Teacher Training College in Amman.

Seventy percent of UNRWA money funds go to the 700 UNRWA schools attended by 500,000 children and adolescents. In October 2017, the European Union voted to contribute an additional €9.5 million to UNRWA in response to a call "to help close a shortfall".

== Major challenges ==
UNRWA, cited a 2013 Fafo Foundation report, said that Amman New camp is ranked second out of the ten Palestine refugee camps in Jordan (Note: The ten Palestine refugee camps in Jordan are Amman New Camp, Baqa'a Camp, Husn Camp, Irbid Camp, Jabal el-Hussein Camp, Jerash Camp, Marka Camp, Souf Camp, Talbieh Camp, and Zarqa Camp.) in terms of poverty and female employment. The income of 34% of Palestine refugees there is below Jordan's national poverty line of JD 814. Only 24% of the women in the camp are employed. Eight percent of the camp's population have severe chronic health problems, making it the worst of all the ten. Sixty-six percent of the refugees there have no health insurance. There are no green areas or open play space in the camp which is overcrowded. Many shelters were built in the 1950s and are now in bad state of repair. Many needed to be torn down and replaced as "the building material is inadequate (roofs made of corrugated metal plates, cement of poor quality)."

UNRWA receives 30 percent of its budget from the United States. The US announced on January 16, 2018, that they will withhold $60 million of the $125 million it had planned to send to UNRWA in 2018. UNRWA funding is almost entirely from U.N. member states. According to Spiegel journalist Thore Schröder, who visited Al-Wehdat in January 2018, teachers, doctors and garbage collectors have been laid off and people who live in Al-Wehdat have rented pick-up trucks to manage garbage disposal. Schools are closed for the holidays. According to the 2018 Spiegel article, Israeli Prime Minister Benjamin Netanyahu wants the UNRWA to be completely replaced by UNHCR. Schröder cites the case of a 52-year-old tailor who was born in Amman, Jordan, has lived there all his life, but maintains that his real home is the village Ramla, in the heart of Israel that he has never visited. Netanyahu says the hope of the Palestinian right of return, is unrealistic.

== Al-Wehdat SC ==
The Al-Wehdat Sports Club was originally established at the camp in 1956 by the UNWRA as the Al-Wehdat Youth Center. By 1975 Al-Wihdat won the Jordanian league.

== Notable people ==
Notable people from Al-Wehdat include writer Ibrahim Nasrallah whose parents came to Al Wehdat in 1948, when they were forced from their home in Al-Burayj in Palestine. His series of novels, Gaza Weddings, were translated into English in 2017. Nasrallah's parents took refuge in Al-Wehdat camp after they were uprooted from their home in Al-Bruij near Jerusalem in 1948. Nasrallah, who was born and grew up in the camp, studied at UNWRA schools there and the UNRWA Teacher Training College in Amman.

Nihad Awad, who is the director of the Council on American-Islamic Relations (CAIR), has been interviewed frequently by Fox, the BBC, The New York Times, The Washington Post, Al-Jazeera, C-Span, and other mainstream media outlets.
