= Qaddura =

Qaddura Refugee Camp
- Refugee Camp

Arabic transcription(s)
  - Arabic: مخيّم قدورة
- Location of Qaddura Refugee Camp within Palestine
- Coordinates: 31°54′3.32″N 35°12′21.18″E
- State: State of Palestine
- Governorate: Ramallah and al-Bireh

Government
  - Type: Refugee Camp

Population (2017)
  - Total: 924

Qaddura Refugee Camp (Arabic: مخيّم قدورة) is a Palestinian refugee camp in the Ramallah and al-Bireh Governorate, located just outside downtown Ramallah in the central West Bank. According to the Palestinian Central Bureau of Statistics (PCBS), the Camp had a population of 924 inhabitants in 2017. Qaddura camp was established in 1948, but is not recognized as an official UNRWA camp.
