= Aqabat Jaber =

Palestinian refugee camp near Jericho, West Bank, State of Palestine

- Municipality type C

Arabic transcription(s)
  - Arabic: مخيّم عقبة جبر
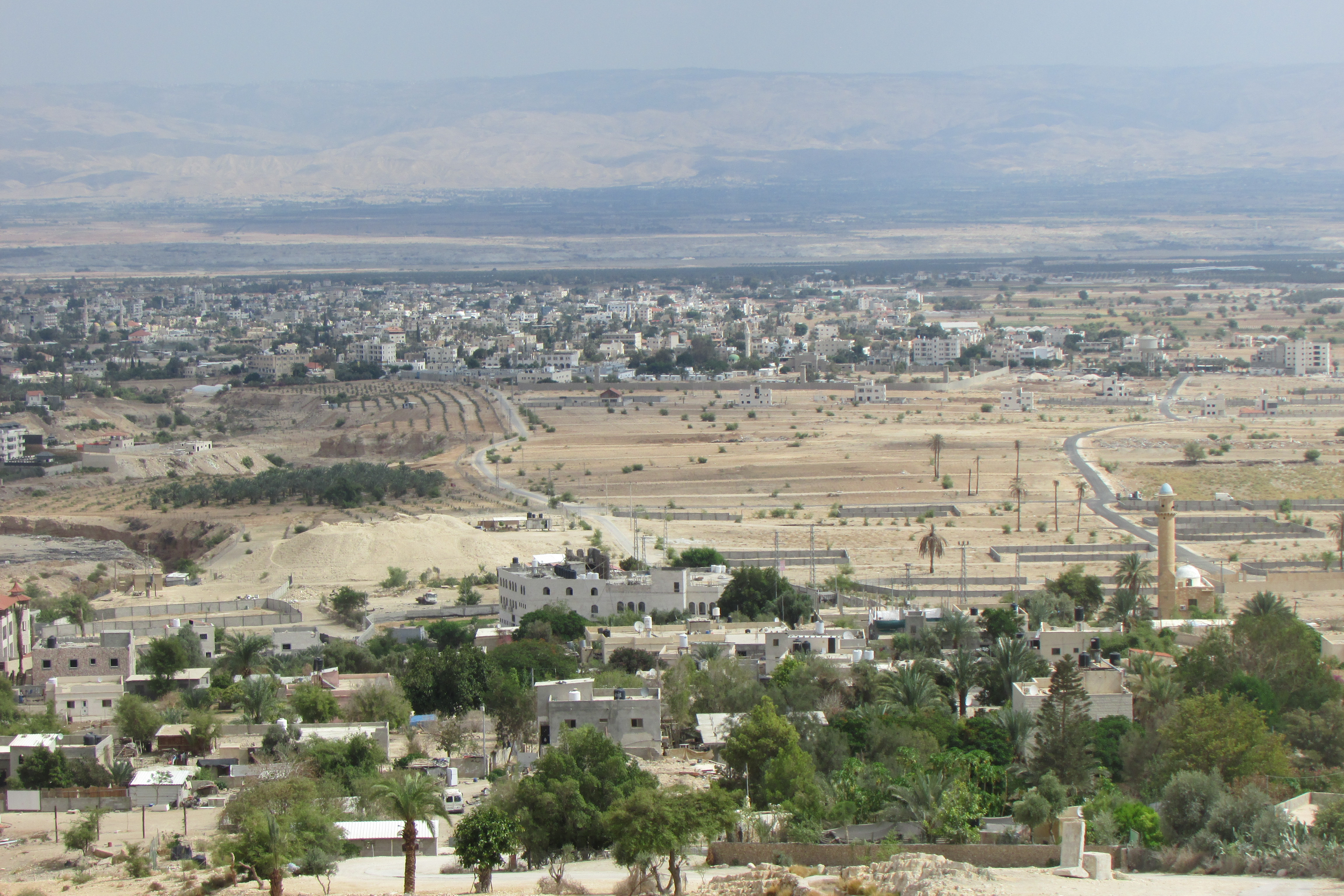
- Aqabat Jaber in the front, Jericho in the distance

- Location of Aqabat Jaber within Palestine
- Coordinates: 31°50′17.00″N 35°26′30.20″E
- State: State of Palestine
- Governorate: Jericho

Government
  - Type: Municipality

Population (2017)
  - Total: 8,960

Aqabat Jaber (Arabic: مخيّم عقبة جبر) is a Palestinian refugee camp in the Jericho Governorate of the eastern West Bank, situated in the Jordan Valley, three kilometers southwest of Jericho.

== History ==
Aqabat Jaber was established in 1948 on 1,688 dunams of arid land near the Dead Sea. Prior to the 1967 Six-Day War, the number of registered Palestinian refugees totaled around 30,000. During and after the hostilities, the majority of refugees fled the camp and crossed the Jordan River. On 13 November 1985, following an agreement with UNRWA, the Israeli authorities began a program of demolishing unused houses. At the time the camp's population was 3,000. Following the signing of the Gaza–Jericho Agreement in 1994, the camp came under the control of the Palestinian National Authority.

In 2005 Aqabat Jaber had a population of 5,566 registered refugees. Non-refugees have moved onto the camp's lands and built illegal homes.

== Water availability ==
Water scarcity is a major problem in this desert area, especially during the summer. The UNRWA is able to provide some water to the camp by pumping it from a nearby spring. However, the Israeli water company Mekorot is the main supplier of water to the camp.

== Filmography ==
- Eyal Sivan: Aqabat-Jaber, passing through (1987)
