= Jabal el-Hussein camp =

Jabal el-Hussein camp مخيم الحسين
- Refugee camp
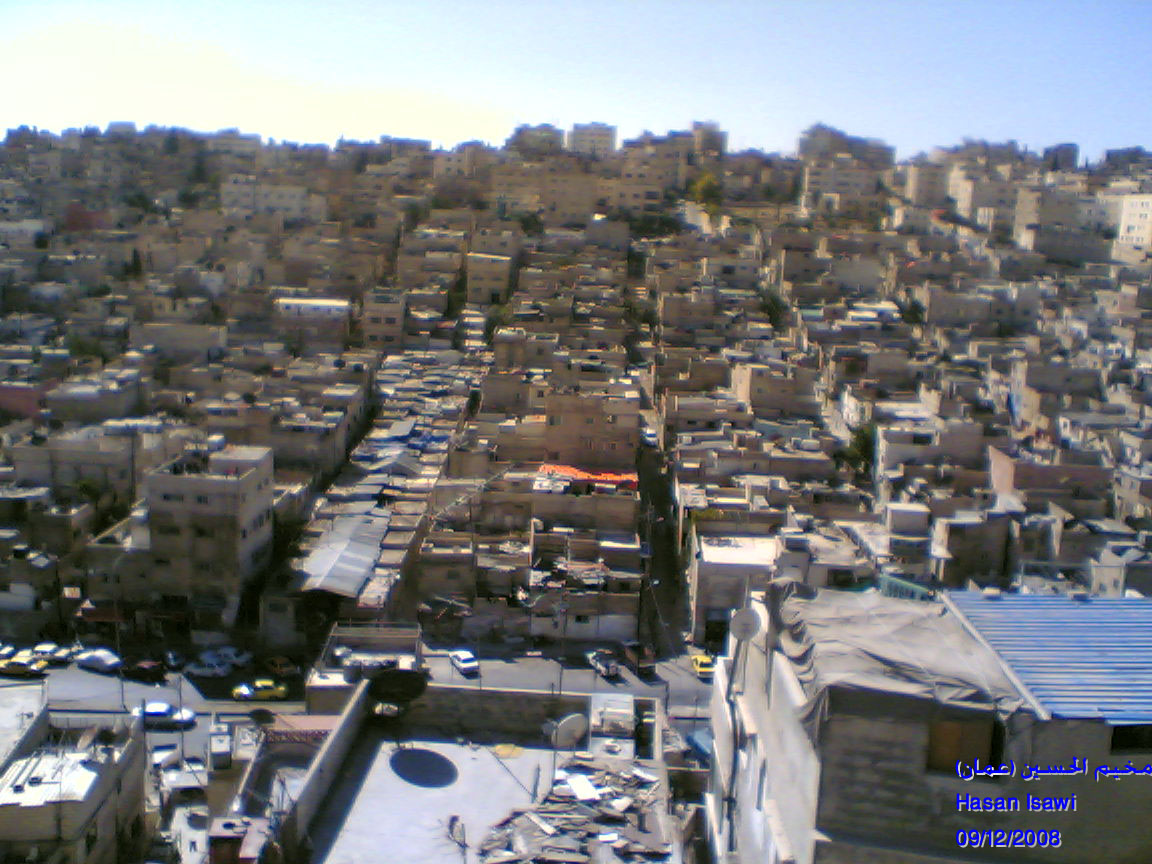

- Location in Jordan
- Coordinates: 31°57′52″N 35°54′23″E
- Country: Jordan
- Governorate: Amman Governorate
- Established: 1952

Area
  - Total: 0.42 km^{2} (0.16 sq mi)

Population (2019)
  - Total: 32,000
- Time zone: UTC+2 (Eastern European Standard Time)
  - Summer (DST): UTC+3 (Arabia Standard Time)

Jabal el-Hussein camp (Arabic: مخيم الحسين) is one of the 10 officially recognized UNRWA Palestinian refugee camps in Jordan. It is located outside of the Abdali area district of Amman.

It is one of the first four refugee camps in Jordan founded to accommodate refugees from the 1948 Palestinian expulsion and flight, the others being Irbid, Al-Wehdat and Zarqa.
