= Wavel refugee camp =

Palestinian refugee camp near Baalbeck, Lebanon

Coordinates: 33°59′56.27″N 36°11′35.46″E

Wavel (Arabic: وافل) is a Palestinian refugee camp near the city of Baalbeck in Lebanon. It was originally a French army barrack, but in 1948 refugees from the 1948 Arab-Israeli war found shelter there. In 1952, UNRWA took over responsibility for providing services in the camp.

== Wavel today ==
As of 2013, there were 8806 registered refugees in the camp. In 2009 there were approximately 3000 refugees within the camp and a similar number living outside the camp. There are also two UNRWA schools, including a secondary school and one health centre. Major issues affecting the camp are harsh living conditions, high school drop-out rate and limited employment opportunities

== See also ==
- Palestinian refugee camps
- Palestinian refugee
- UNRWA
- Baalbek
