= Al-Qisa =

Al-Qisa القيسا Qaysa
- Village
- Location within Syria
- Coordinates: 33°29′8″N 36°32′30″E
- Country: Syria
- Governorate: Rif Dimashq
- District: Douma
- Subdistrict: Al-Nashabiyah

Population (2004)
  - Total: 4,151
- Time zone: UTC+3 (EET)
  - Summer (DST): UTC+2 (EEST)

Al-Qisa (Arabic: القيسا, also spelled Qaysa) is a town in southern Syria, administratively part of the Rif Dimashq Governorate, located southeast of Damascus. Nearby localities include Harran al-Awamid to the south, Otaybah to the east, al-Abadah to the northeast, al-Jarba to the north, al-Qasimiyah to the northwest, al-Bilaliyah and Deir Salman to the west and al-Ahmadiyah to the southwest. According to the Syria Central Bureau of Statistics (CBS), al-Qisa had a population of 4,151 in the 2004 census.
