= Marj al-Sultan =

Marj al-Sultan مرج السلطان
- Village
- Location within Syria
- Coordinates: 33°29′36″N 36°28′13″E
- Country: Syria
- Governorate: Rif Dimashq
- District: Douma
- Subdistrict: Al-Nashabiyah

Population (2004)
  - Total: 1,860
- Time zone: UTC+3 (EET)
  - Summer (DST): UTC+2 (EEST)

Marj al-Sultan (Arabic: مرج السلطان, also spelled Marj Sultan, meaning "the meadow of Sulṭān") is a village in southern Syria, administratively part of the Rif Dimashq Governorate, located 15 kilometers east of Damascus city. The village is situated in the fertile Ghouta region amid an orchard-filled area. Nearby localities include Harasta al-Qantarah and Zabdin to the west, al-Nashabiyah to the north, al-Bilaliyah to the east, Deir Salman to the southeast, Sakka to the south and Deir al-Asafir to the southwest.

According to the Syria Central Bureau of Statistics, Marj al-Sultan had a population of 1,860 in the 2004 census. In 2012 the population was estimated to be 2,500. Its inhabitants are predominantly members of Syria's Circassian community.

== History ==
=== Establishment during the Ottoman era ===
Marj al-Sultan was founded in 1877–78 by some 25 Circassian refugee families, mostly from the Abzakh and Shapsugh tribes, from Anatolia whose settlement in the area was facilitated by the Ottoman authorities. This group of Circassians had come to Anatolia (modern-day Turkey) after being relocated from Bulgaria, which itself was a refuge for the Circassians after they had been forced out of their homeland in the Caucasus in 1864 by invading Russian forces. They arrived to Marj al-Sultan via the land route through Aleppo and Homs in the north of Syria. The governor of Damascus Province at the time, Medhat Pasha, took a liking to the Circassians, himself having a Circassian wife, offered the Circassian migrants residence in the Damascus city suburbs of Diwaniyyah and Muhajirun, but they refused opting to take up residence in Marj al-Sultan and the Golan Heights region. The former abounded in water springs, trees and grassy areas.

The newly established village was built in a well-planned and organized manner and would subsequently thrive as a settlement, Initially, it was decided that the southeastern part of the village would serve as the place of residence, but the villagers decided to build up in the western section after the discovery of an old Roman cemetery. The Circassians built small, one-story adobe brick houses with poplar wood roofing. They were organized in a similar manner, all of them being directly off the street. Only three of the homes, belonging to the tribal heads, had two floors, the top floors of which contained one room for guest lodging. In 1879 a mosque was built in the Shapsugh quarter of the village.

The land had been property of Sultan Abdul Hamid I, hence the name Marj al-Sultan ("Plain of the Sultan.") It was here that the sultan had his 3,000 military horses graze in the spring and fall seasons. The government distributed a pair of cattle, a pair of oxen, poultry, foodstuffs and tents to each family. The village prospered and became a transit point for Circassians before migrating to the Golan Heights and Transjordan and for those traveled to do business in Damascus, Homs and Aleppo. The second generation of Syrian Circassians pursued better educational opportunities in Damascus and Marj al-Sultan's population gradually decreased.

=== Modern era ===
During the Great Syrian Revolt (1925–27) against the French Mandate rule, Marj al-Sultan's residents opted not to join the rebellion. The village was attacked sometime during the revolt. Although clashes between the inhabitants and the more unruly Bedouin tribes of the region would occur periodically, there were generally lasting agreements in place between the factions. The last major clash broke out in 1954, after Syria's independence, when about 2,000 Bedouin tribesmen launched a raid against Marj al-Sultan, which had a total population of 350 at the time. The villagers, most of whom were well-skilled in firearms, managed to fend off the Bedouin. In 1951 a public library was built in the village and sometime before that the Marj al-Sultan Rural Club was established, the first of its kind to be built in the rural areas surrounding Damascus.

Rebels seeking to overthrow the government of Bashar al-Assad took shelter in Marj al-Sultan in November 2012, during the ongoing Syrian civil war that began in March 2011. Government forces subsequently bombarded the village and its entire population reportedly fled the violence. Most headed towards the Damascus suburb town of Qudsaya or the city district of Rukn al-Din, both areas being heavily populated by Circassians. The November clashes resulted in the destruction of between 10 and 15 houses, according to local witnesses. The casualty figures were not determined. On 25 November rebels claimed to have captured the adjacent military airbase, also called Marj al-Sultan, from government forces. The Syrian Observatory for Human Rights, an opposition activist group documenting the conflict, confirmed the rebels' claims. They had reportedly been in control of the surrounding areas months prior to the base's capture. Fawaz Tello, a pro-opposition campaigner, stated the capture appeared to be a rebel attempt to cut off Damascus from the Damascus International Airport as well as from Aleppo. The airbase at Marj al-Sultan was reported to have been re-captured by troops of the Syrian government on Monday, December 14, 2015.
