= Harran al-Awamid =

Town in southern Syria

Harran al-'Awamid حران العواميد
- Town
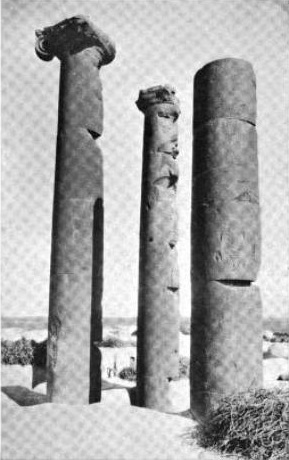
- The basaltic Roman-era columns from which Harran al-Awamid receives its name, 1903

- Location within Syria
- Coordinates: 33°26′50″N 36°33′33″E
- Country: Syria
- Governorate: Rif Dimashq
- District: Douma
- Subdistrict: Harran al-Awamid

Population (2004)
  - Total: 12,117
- Time zone: UTC+3 (EET)
  - Summer (DST): UTC+2 (EEST)

Harran al-'Awamid (Arabic: حران العواميد) is a town in southern Syria, administratively part of the Rif Dimashq Governorate, located southeast of Damascus. It is situated on a plain that stretches to the marshes of Bahrat al-Qibliyah ("South Lake," the source of the Barada River) along the boundary of the fertile Ghouta region to the west, to the north of the Hauran. Nearby localities include al-Kafrayn and Judaydat al-Khas to the south, al-Atibeh to the northeast, al-Abadah and al-Qisa to the north, al-Ahmadiyah to the northwest, Sakka to the west and Ghasulah and al-Ghizlaniyah to the southwest.

According to the Syria Central Bureau of Statistics (CBS), Harran al-'Awamid had a population of 12,117 in the 2004 census. It is the administrative center and the most populous locality of the Harran al-'Awamid nahiyah ("subdistrict") which consisted of four localities with a collective population of 22,853 in 2004. The town was well known for its mudbrick architecture and three basalt columns of an ancient Roman temple, hence the name Harran al-'Awamid ("Harran of the Columns.") The columns themselves shoot out of the roof of a mudbrick building, which, along with many of the town's houses, have occupied the ruins of the temple.

== History ==
Under Ottoman rule in the late 19th century, Harran al-Awamid was visited by archaeologist William McLure Thomson, who asserted that it was the Haran mentioned in the Bible. He noted that the plantation of Bahrat al-Qibliyah could be seen from the roof of the village's mosque. The area was inhabited by Bedouins (nomads) and semi-nomadic Arabs.

== Roman temple ==
Because the ruins of the Roman temple, which likely dates to the reign of Emperor Philip the Arab (244-49 CE), have become entangled with Harran al-Awamid's mudbrick houses, the plan of the temple could not be ascertained. However, it has been determined that the structure was built on a high podium as indicated by the columns' elevation and location which also suggests that they marked the temple's northwestern corner. The columns have a height of roughly twelve feet and a width of six feet. They are constructed in the Ionic style from black basalt stone with ornately carved capitals, although one of the column's capitals had fallen off. The columns consisted of either six or seven parts that are cracked and worn out. The style of the capitals is similar to that of the columns of ancient Roman temples in the Hauran region, being based upon the acanthus. However, those at Harran al-Awamid were "more boldly drawn and are wrought in more massive style, a little coarser, perhaps..."

== Bibliography ==
- Butler, H.C. (1903). Architecture and other arts. Vol. 2. The Century Co.
- Thomson, W.M. (1886). The land and the Book: or, Biblical illustrations drawn from the manners and customs, the scenes and scenery, of the Holy Land, by William M. Thomson. Harper.
