= Adra, Syria =

'Adra عَدْرَا
- Village
- Location within Syria
- Coordinates: 33.6°N 36.515°E
- Country: Syria
- Governorate: Rif Dimashq
- District: Douma
- Subdistrict: Douma

Population (2004 census)
  - Total: 20,559
- Time zone: UTC+2 (EET)
  - Summer (DST): UTC+3 (EEST)
- Climate: BWk

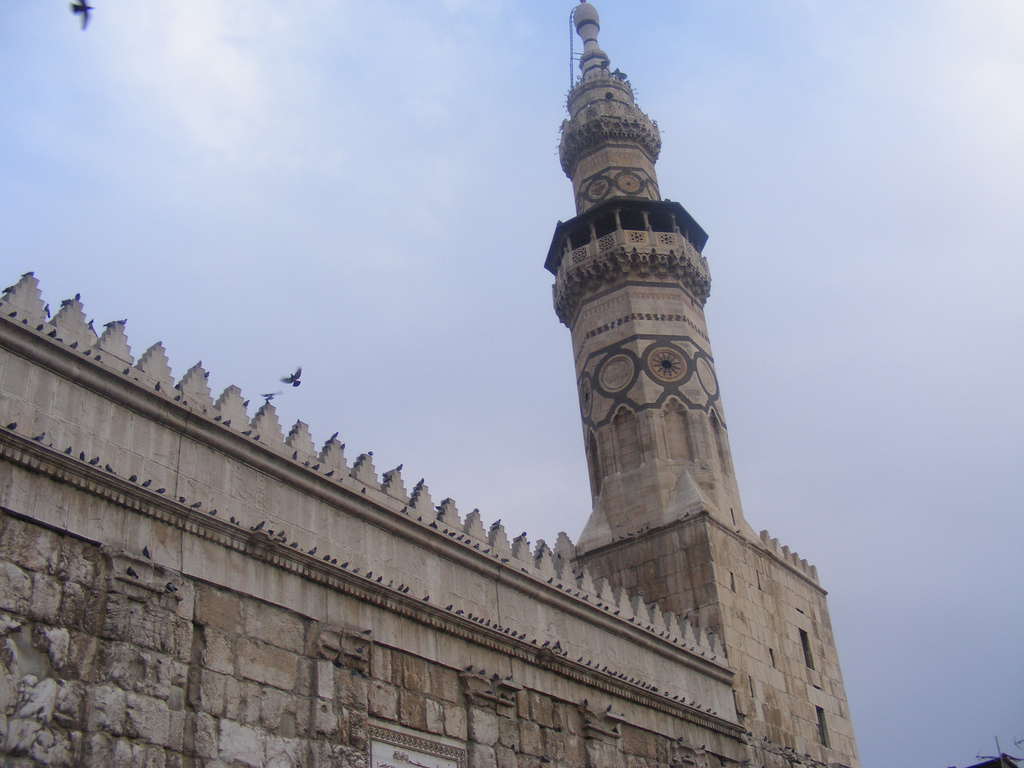
Hujr ibn Adi Mosque

'Adra (Arabic: عَدْرَا, romanized: ʿAdrā) is a town in southern Syria, administratively part of the Rif Dimashq Governorate, located northeast of Damascus. According to the Syria Central Bureau of Statistics, the town had a population of 20,559 in the 2004 census. The Hujr ibn Adi Mosque is located in the town.

== Summary ==
Adra is the site of Syria's largest industrial city, located immediately east of the town. The industrial zone's area is around 7,000 hectares, with half being designated for services and the other half for industries. Its total estimated cost $570 million US. In 2008 there were 90 operating factories while 1,125 factories were under construction. The investment value for active factories was $646 million US. By 2010, Adra's industrial city contained the largest number of active factories and factories under construction in Syria, with a total of 1,952, a few more than in Shaykh Najjar. The city's director-general in 2010 was Ziad Badour.

The town is the site of the Adra Prison. Nearby localities include al-Rihan and Douma to the west, al-Shafuniyah and Hawsh Nasri to the southwest, Midaa to the south, Dumeir to the east, al-Qutayfah to the north, Hufayr al-Tahta to the northwest.

== History ==
Adra is identified with the Biblical town of "Hadrach" mentioned by Zechariah who noted the city, which was defended by Damascus, was condemned.

The Ghassanids, who were Arab Christians, dominated Adra and fought against the Arab Muslim invaders commanded by Khalid ibn al-Walid in the Battle of Marj Rahit in July, 634 CE. The battle resulted in a decisive Rashidun victory and largescale Islamization took place in the area soon after.

Adra contains several graves of sahaba ("companions" of Islamic prophet Muhammad), including most notably that of Hujr ibn Adi. The Zengid ruler Imad al-Din Zengi encamped at Adra in early 1135 before attempting to besiege Damascus which was controlled by the Burids.

In the early 19th-century a ruined khan ("caravansary") was reported by Western travelers to be near the village of Adra.

In 2013, it was the site of the Adra massacre conducted by Islamist rebels against Syrian minorities.

== Bibliography ==
- Gibb, H. A. R. (2003). The Damascus Chronicle of the Crusades: Extracted and Translated from the Chronicle of Ibn Al-Qalanisi. Courier Dover Publications. ISBN 0486425193.
