= Al-Bilaliyah =

Al-Bilaliyah البلالية
- Village
- Location within Syria
- Coordinates: 33°29′45″N 36°29′54″E
- Country: Syria
- Governorate: Rif Dimashq
- District: Douma
- Subdistrict: Al-Nashabiyah

Population (2004)
  - Total: 2,914
- Time zone: UTC+3 (EET)
  - Summer (DST): UTC+2 (EEST)

Al-Bilaliyah (Arabic: البلالية, also spelled ''Bilaliyeh) is a village in southern Syria, administratively part of the Rif Dimashq Governorate, located east of Damascus city. Situated in the fertile Ghouta region, nearby localities include Marj al-Sultan to the west, al-Nashabiyah to the north, al-Qasimiyah and al-Jarba to the northeast, al-Qisa to the east and Deir Salman to the south. According to the Syria Central Bureau of Statistics, al-Bilaliyah had a population of 2,914 in the 2004 census.
