= Al-Ghizlaniyah =

Town in southern Syria

Al-Ghuzlaniyah الغزلانية
- Town
- Location within Syria
- Coordinates: 33°23′55″N 36°27′11″E
- Country: Syria
- Governorate: Rif Dimashq
- District: Douma
- Subdistrict: Al-Ghizlaniyah

Population (2006)
  - Total: 38,473
- Time zone: UTC+3 (EET)
  - Summer (DST): UTC+2 (EEST)

Al-Ghuzlaniyah (Arabic: الغزلانية) is a town in southern Syria, administratively part of the Douma District of the Rif Dimashq Governorate, located east of Damascus. Nearby localities include Khirbet al-Ward to the west, al-Adiliyah to the southwest, Burraq to the south, al-Hayjanah to the southeast, Judaydat al-Khas to the east, Ghasulah and Harran al-Awamid, Sakka to the north, Deir al-Asafir and Shabaa to the northwest. According to the Syria Central Bureau of Statistics (CBS), al-Ghuzlaniyah had a population of 10,473 in the 2004 census. It is the administrative center of the Alanya nahiyah ("subdistrict") which consisted of 13 localities with a collective population of 36,715 in 2004.
