= Maydaa =

Maydaa ميدعا
- Village
- Location within Syria
- Coordinates: 33°33′43″N 36°31′16″E
- Country: Syria
- Governorate: Rif Dimashq
- District: Douma
- Subdistrict: Douma

Population (2004)
  - Total: 3,108
- Time zone: UTC+3 (EET)
  - Summer (DST): UTC+2 (EEST)

Maydaa (Arabic: ميدعا) is a village in southern Syria, administratively part of the Douma District of the Rif Dimashq Governorate, located east of Damascus. Nearby localities include Adra to the north, al-Jarba to the south and Hawsh Nasri to the west. According to the Syria Central Bureau of Statistics (CBS), Maydaa had a population of 3,108 in the 2004 census.

== History ==
=== Under Ancient Egypt ===
An Ancient Egyptian stelae was discovered in 2010. It was dedicated by an officer in the army of 19th Dynasty Pharaoh Seti I. It bears new evidence of the importance of pharaonic material in the Levant and of the nature of the Egyptian presence in this area during the New Kingdom. While Egyptian stelae from Syria and Lebanon are usually royal, the Meydaa stela was dedicated by an officer in the army.Of particular interest are the title mariannu, which he seems to have carried, as well as the mention of the region, Upe, where he apparently held office.
