= Al-Kafrayn, Syria =

Al-Kafrayn الكفرين
- Village
- Location in Syria
- Coordinates: 33°26′5″N 36°33′2″E
- Country: Syria
- Governorate: Rif Dimashq
- District: Douma District
- Subdistrict: Harran al-Awamid

Population (2004)
  - Total: 3,842
- Time zone: UTC+2 (EET)
  - Summer (DST): UTC+3 (EEST)

Al-Kafrayn (Arabic: الكفرين) is a Syrian village located in Douma District, Rif Dimashq, 23.1 kilometers (14.4 mi) southeast of Old Damascus. According to the Syria Central Bureau of Statistics (CBS), Al-Kafrayn had a population of 3,842 in the 2004 census. To its North and East is Harran al-Awamid, Jdeidet al-Khass to its south and Damascus Airport to its west.
