= Za'ura =

Za'ura may refer to:

- Zoora, a Syrian monk
- Za'ura, Syria, a village
