= Hawsh al-Farah =

Hawsh al-Farah حوش الفرح
- Village
- Location in Syria
- Coordinates: 33°33′55″N 36°29′2″E
- Country: Syria
- Governorate: Rif Dimashq
- District: Markaz Rif Dimashq
- Subdistrict: Douma District

Population (2004)
  - Total: 2,451
- Time zone: UTC+2 (EET)
  - Summer (DST): UTC+3 (EEST)
- City Qrya Pcode: C2333

Hawsh al-Farah (also spelled Hosh Elfara; Arabic: حوش الفارة) is a Syrian village located in Markaz Rif Dimashq, Douma District. Hawsh al-Farah had a population of 2,451 in the 2004 census.
