= Qarahta =

Qarahta قرحتا
- Village
- Location in Syria
- Coordinates: 33°34′35″N 36°26′51″E
- Country: Syria
- Governorate: Rif Dimashq
- District: Markaz Rif Dimashq
- Subdistrict: Douma District

Population (2004)
  - Total: 1,951
- Time zone: UTC+2 (EET)
  - Summer (DST): UTC+3 (EEST)
- City Qrya Pcode: C2378

Qarahta (Arabic: قرحتا), is a Syrian village located in Markaz Rif Dimashq, Douma District. According to the Syria Central Bureau of Statistics (CBS), Qarahta had a population of 1,951 in the 2004 census.
