= Al-Khamisiyah =

Al-Khamisiyah الخامسية
- Village
- Location in Syria
- Coordinates: 33°28′16″N 36°30′8.32″E
- Country: Syria
- Governorate: Rif Dimashq
- District: Markaz Rif Dimashq
- Subdistrict: Douma District

Population (2004)
  - Total: 1,024
- Time zone: UTC+3 (AST)
- City Qrya Pcode: C2358

Al-Khamisiyah (also spelled Khamissiyeh; Arabic: الخامسية) is a Syrian village located in Markaz Rif Dimashq, Douma District. Al-Khamisiyah had a population of 1,024 in the 2004 census.
