= Al-Damen =

Al-Damen الضامن
- Village
- Country: Syria
- Governorate: Rif Dimashq
- District: Markaz Rif Dimashq
- Subdistrict: Douma District

Population (2004)
  - Total: 3,571
- Time zone: UTC+2 (EET)
  - Summer (DST): UTC+3 (EEST)
- City Qrya Pcode: NA

Al-Damen (Arabic: الضامن) is a Syrian village located in Douma District. Al-Damen had a population of 3,571 in the 2004 census.
