= Batihat al-Wafidin =

Batihat al-Wafidin بطيحة الوافدين
- Village
- Location in Syria
- Coordinates: 33°35′45″N 36°26′1″E
- Country: Syria
- Governorate: Rif Dimashq
- District: Douma District
- Subdistrict: Douma District

Population (2004)
  - Total: 16,539
- Time zone: UTC+2 (EET)
  - Summer (DST): UTC+3 (EEST)
- City Qrya Pcode: C2330

Batihat al-Wafidin (also spelled Btihet Elwafedine; Arabic: بطيحة الوافدين) is a Syrian village located in Douma District. Batihat al-Wafidin had a population of 16,539 in the 2004 census.
