= Eleonore Merza =

French anthropologist

- Born: 1980 (age 45–46); Paris
- Education: Centre national de la recherche scientifique; Ecole des Hautes Etudes en Sciences Sociales
- Occupation: Anthropologist

Eleonore Merza (born 1980?) is an anthropologist who studies Adygean (Circassian) diaspora communities in Israel and beyond.

== Biography ==
Merza was born in Paris circa 1980. Her father's family were Circassian, originally from Maykop in Adygea, who were forced to flee from the region in the 1860s by the Russian government. This era became known as the Circassian genocide, where 1.5 million people were killed, and 90% of the same number who remained were forced to emigrate. Merza's great-grandfather Mamet Merzamwkhwo was a refugee who fled, first to the Balkans, then to the Golan Heights where twelve Circassian villages were founded, including Mansoura where the family settled. Later the inhabitants were expelled following the Israeli invasion and moved to Syria.

Merza's mother's family were Algerian Jews; the two met at a Communist Party meeting in Paris whilst studying abroad. They married and lived in Paris, where Merza and her brother Alexandre-Indar were born. Merza spent her early childhood in Amman as her father worked there an engineer. She attended a French school. And lived in a Circassian community.

== Career ==
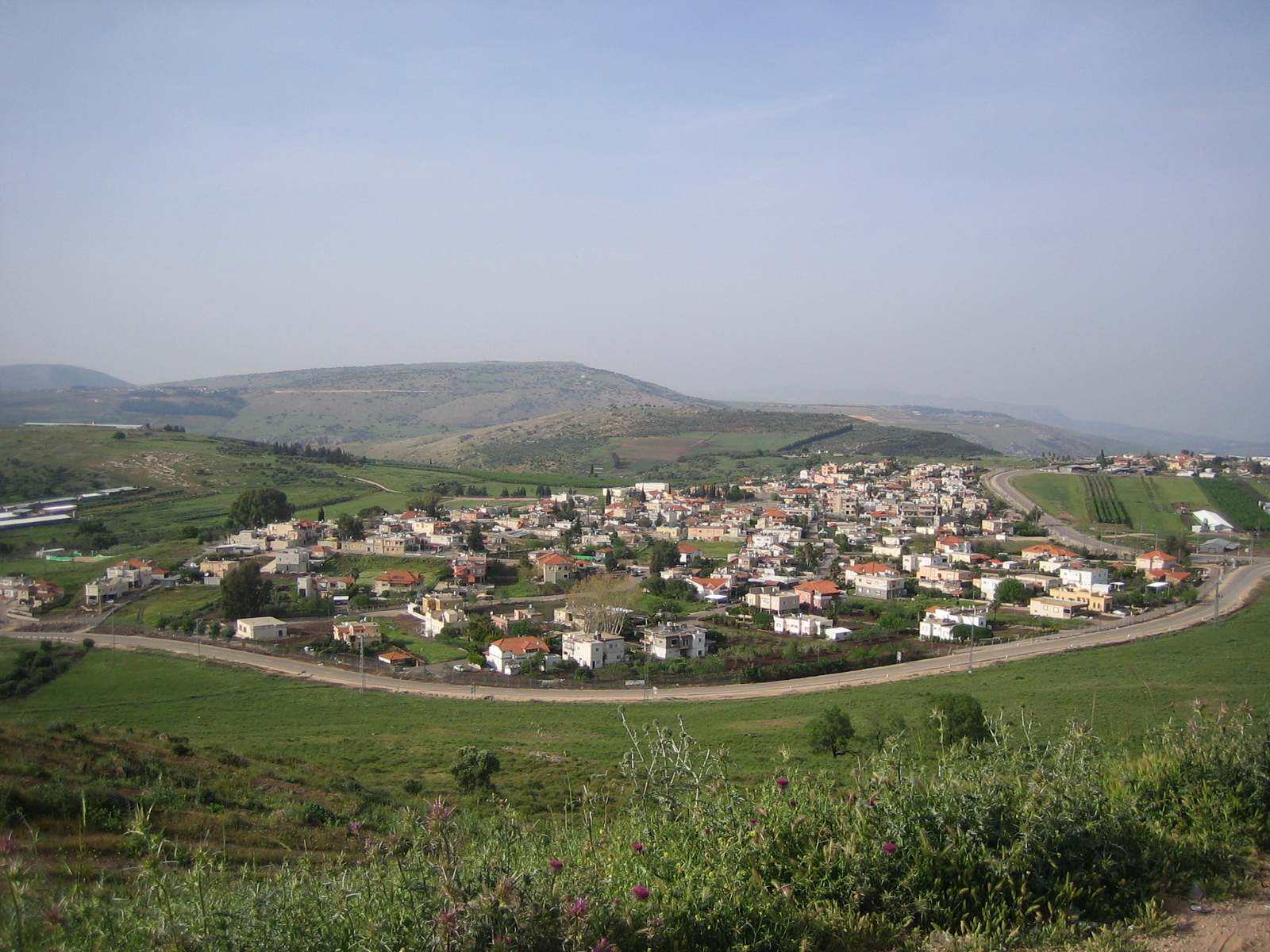
Reyhaniya, one of two Circassian towns in Israel

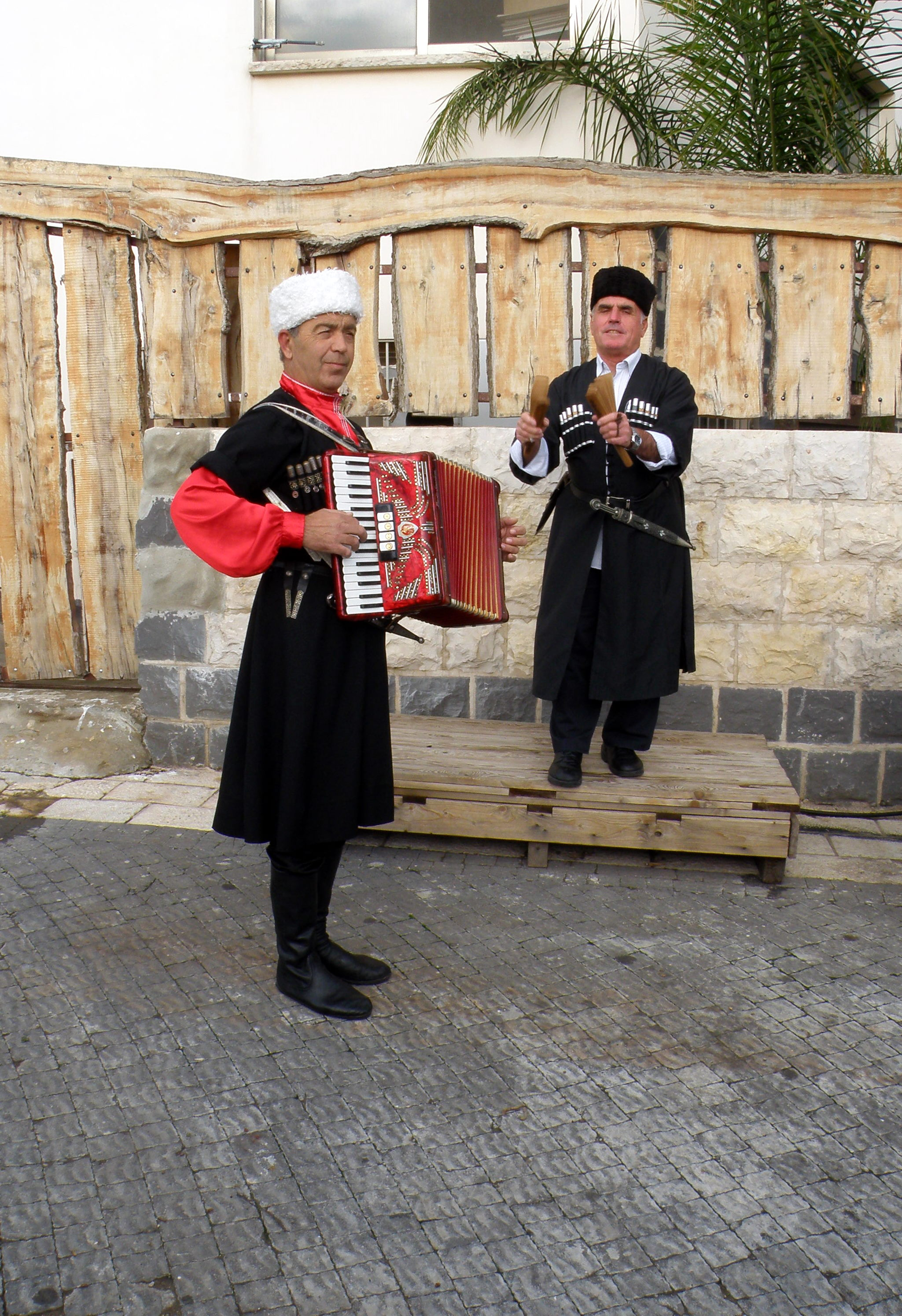
Circassian men in Kfar Kama, the other village

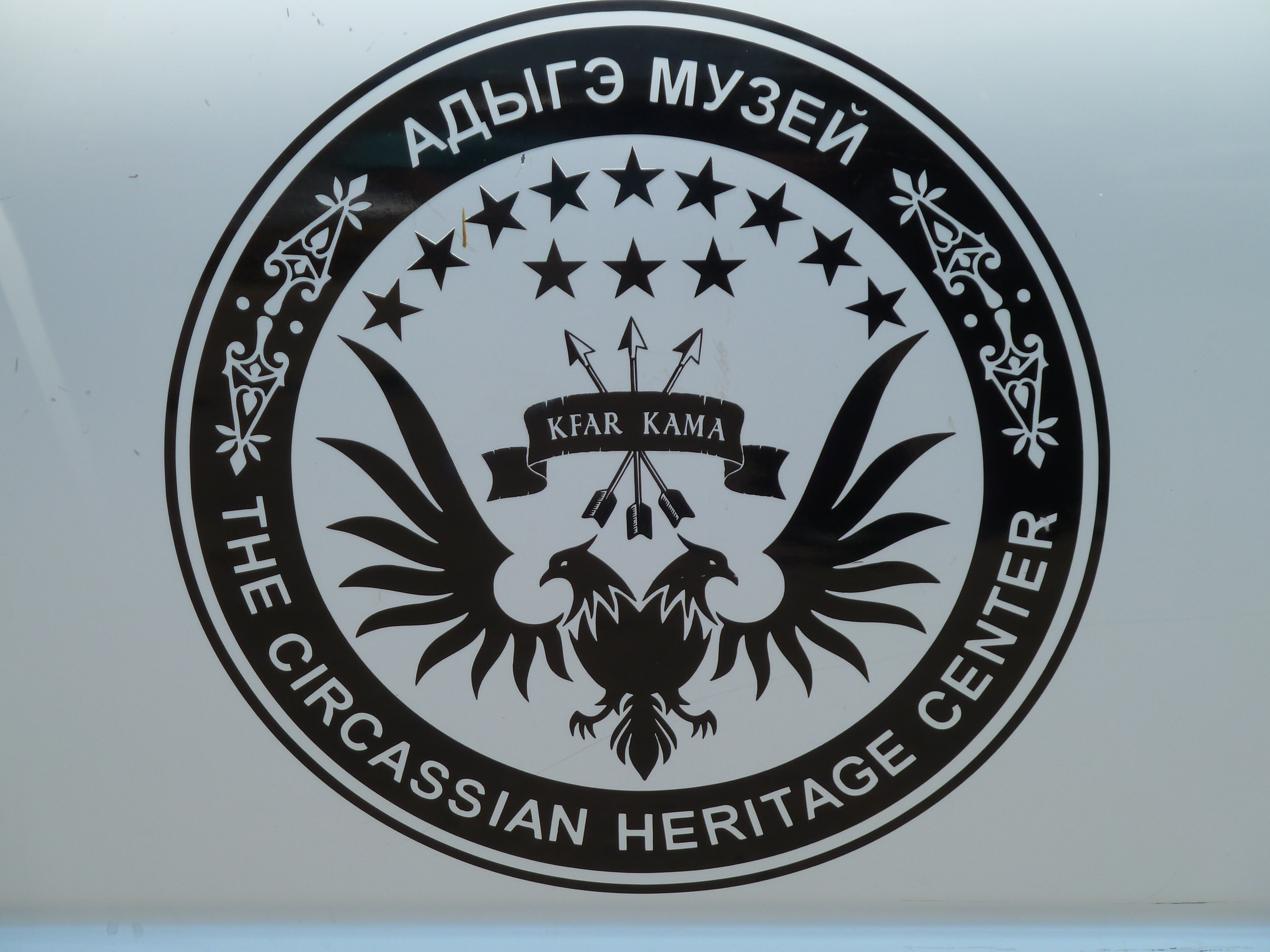
The Circassian Heritage Centre in Kfar Kama

Merza undertook doctoral research at Ecole des Hautes Etudes en Sciences Sociales where she examined how Circassian (specifically Adygean), Jewish and Muslim identities intersect within Israel. Her thesis was entitled: “Neither Jews nor Arabs in Israel: Identity of a minority in a space of war and in dialectics of negotiations - Test case of the Circassians (Adygheans) of Kfar Kama and Reyhaniya”. Whilst undertaking fieldwork for her doctoral research in Israel, Merza's dual identity became problematic with frequent interrogation by Israeli authorities about her political beliefs. Merza's postdoctoral research at the Centre national de la recherche scientifique looked the idea of occupation, in terms of those who are conscientious objectors against military service and attitudes of society towards them, as well as the economic impact of occupation for Israel.

In 2015, she and her husband Eitan Bronstein Aparicio founded the NGO De-Colonizer to try to begin to sensitise Israelis to their colonial history.

In 2018 Merza published a new work Nakba, which aims to bring the discussion of the role of the Israeli state as a coloniser back to public consciousness. Her understanding of the Nakba has contributed to other academic projects. This work is part of a trend in memory activism in Israel since 1998. Both believe that Palestinian points of view need to be understood by Israeli Jews.

Selected publications include:

- Nakba (Omniscience, 2018)
- 'The Israeli Circassians: non-Arab Arabs', Bulletin du Centre de recherche français à Jérusalem (2012)
- 'Being both Non-Jewish Israelis and Non-Palestinian Muslims: Isn't it Too Much?', Bulletin du Centre de recherche français à Jérusalem (2010)

She lives in Tel Aviv and in addition to her anthropological research works as a photographer and a writer.
