= Al-Ahmadiyah, Rif Dimashq =

Al-Ahmadiyah الأحمدية
- Village
- Location in Syria
- Coordinates: 33°28′16″N 36°31′7″E
- Country: Syria
- Governorate: Rif Dimashq
- District: Markaz Rif Dimashq
- Subdistrict: Al-Nashabiyah

Population (2004)
  - Total: 2,352
- Time zone: UTC+2 (EET)
  - Summer (DST): UTC+3 (EEST)
- City Qrya Pcode: C2353

Al-Ahmadiyah (Arabic: الأحمدية) is a Syrian village located in Markaz Rif Dimashq, Rif Dimashq to the southeast of the al-Nashabiyah nahiyah ("subdistrict"). According to the Syria Central Bureau of Statistics (CBS), Al-Ahmadiyah had a population of 2,352 in the 2004 census.
