= Al-Bitariyah =

Al-Bitariyah البيطارية
- Village
- Location in Syria
- Coordinates: 33°18′52″N 36°32′32″E
- Country: Syria
- Governorate: Rif Dimashq
- District: Douma District
- Subdistrict: Al-Ghizlaniyah

Population (2004)
  - Total: 3,026
- Time zone: UTC+2 (EET)
  - Summer (DST): UTC+3 (EEST)
- City Qrya Pcode: C2369

Al-Bitariyah (Arabic: البيطارية) is a Syrian village located in Douma District, Rif Dimashq. According to the Syria Central Bureau of Statistics (CBS), Al-Bitariyah had a population of 3,026 in the 2004 census.
