= As-Summaqah =

Depopulated Syrian village in the Golan Heights

As-Summaqah اﻟﺴﻤﺎﻗﺔ
- Village
- Location within the Golan Heights
- Coordinates: 33°09′34.7″N 35°43′29.8″E
- Grid position: 218/285 PAL
- Country: Syria
- Governorate: Quneitra
- District: Quneitra
- Region: Golan Heights
- Destroyed: 1967

Population
  - Total: 150

As-Summaqah, Sumaqa or Samaqa (Arabic: اﻟﺴﻤﺎﻗﺔ or ﺳﻤﺎﻗﺔ), is a former Syrian village located in the Golan Heights.

== History ==
The settlement has been inhabited intermittent throughout history. It has remains from the Early Bronze Age II or III, Iron Age I, Roman, Mamluk and Ottoman periods. The Mamluks produced grape honey in the village.

In the 15th–16th century, the al-Fadl tribe left northeastern Syria after an internal conflict. When they arrived in the Golan Heights they settled in several villages in the area including Summaqah. They worked with agriculture and livestock.

Transhumance shaped settlement in the Golan for centuries because of its harsh winters. The winters "forced tribespeople until the 19th century to live in hundreds of rudimentary 'winter villages' in their tribal territory. Starting in the second part of the 19th century, villages became "fixed and formed the nucleus of fully sedentary life in the 20th century Golan." This continued till after the French Mandate.

After Israel occupied the area in the Six-Day War, they began destroying Syrian villages in the Golan Heights. Summaqah was destroyed in 1967. The population before the war was 150.

== See also ==
- Syrian towns and villages depopulated in the Arab-Israeli conflict

== Bibliography ==
- Sulimani, Gideon; Kletter, Raz (2022). "Settler-Colonialism and the Diary of an Israeli Settler in the Golan Heights: The Notebooks of Izhaki Gal". Journal of Holy Land and Palestine Studies. 21 (1). Edinburgh University Press: 48–71. doi:10.3366/hlps.2022.0283. ISSN 2054-1988.
- Tsioni, Gil (2010). "A Mameluke Grape-Honey Treading Installation in the Golan Heights, Israel". Israel Exploration Journal. 60 (2). Israel Exploration Society: 222–244. ISSN 0021-2059. JSTOR 27927265.
- ‘Abbasi, Mustafa; Seltenreich, Yair (2007). "A Leader on Both Sides of the Border: The Amir Fa'our al-Fa'our Between Syria and Mandatory Palestine". Holy Land Studies. 6 (1): 23–49. doi:10.3366/hls.2007.0013. ISSN 1474-9475.
