= Hufayr al-Tahta =

Hufayr al-Tahta حفير التحتا
- Village
- Location in Syria
- Coordinates: 33°38′57″N 36°26′10″E
- Country: Syria
- Governorate: Rif Dimashq
- District: Douma District
- Subdistrict: Douma District

Population (2004)
  - Total: 3,688
- Time zone: UTC+2 (EET)
  - Summer (DST): UTC+3 (EEST)
- City Qrya Pcode: C2336

Hufayr al-Tahta (also spelled Hafir Tahta; Arabic: حفير التحتا) is a Syrian village located in the Douma District of Rif Dimashq. Hufayr al-Tahta had a population of 3,688 as per the 2004 census.
