= Shayta =

Abandoned Syrian Village in the Golan Heights

Shayta سحيتا
- Village
- The Golan on the map of Syria; Shayta on the map of the Golan
- Coordinates: 33°15′N 35°46′E
- Grid position: 221/295 PAL
- Country: Syria
- Governorate: Quneitra
- District: Quneitra District
- Subdistrict: Mas'ade
- Region: Golan Heights
- Destroyed: 1971-72
- Elevation: 1,189 m (3,901 ft)

S-hayta, also spelled Suhayta, S'heita or Su'heita, (Arabic: سحيتا) was a Syrian Druze village located in the Golan Heights. It was one of only six Syrian villages in the Golan Heights still populated following the Six-Day War. After Israel occupied the area in 1967, S-hayta's population census was 176 people, down from 200 in 1960. In 1967, S-hayta was partially destroyed and a military post built in its place. Israel completely destroyed the village in 1971-72 and its population was forcibly transferred to the neighboring village of Mas'ade. Today, its former inhabitants are still campaigning for the return to their village. S-hayta was located near the ceasefire line between Syrian and Israeli forces.

== See also ==
- Syrian towns and villages depopulated in the Arab-Israeli conflict
