= Al-Rihan =

Al-Rihan الريحان
- Village
- Location in Syria
- Coordinates: 33°34′35″N 36°26′51″E
- Country: Syria
- Governorate: Rif Dimashq
- District: Douma District
- Subdistrict: Douma

Population (2004)
  - Total: 4,099
- Time zone: UTC+2 (EET)
  - Summer (DST): UTC+3 (EEST)
- City Qrya Pcode: C2337

Al-Rihan (Arabic: الريحان) also spelled Ar-Rayhan, is a Syrian village located in the Douma District of Rif Dimashq. According to the Syria Central Bureau of Statistics (CBS), Al-Rihan had a population of 4,099 in the 2004 census.
