= Adra massacre =

2013 massacre during the Syrian Civil War

- Part of the Syrian Civil War
- Location: Adra, Syria
- Date: 11–12 December 2013 (1 day)
- Target: Alawites, Christians, Druze and Ismailites
- Attack type: Massacre
- Deaths: 32–40 (opposition claim); 80–100 (government claim)
- Perpetrators: Jaysh al-Islam and Al-Nusra Front
- Motive: Sectarian

The Adra massacre was the killing of at least 32 Alawite, Christian, Druze and Ismailite civilians in the industrial town of Adra, Syria in December 2013, during the Syrian Civil War. According to the government and activists it was conducted by the al-Nusra Front. The U.S. State Department condemned the massacres in Syria including the massacre of civilians in Adra.

== Infiltration and massacre ==
On 11 December, the Islamic Front, Jaysh al-Islam and Al-Nusra Front groups infiltrated the industrial area of the town of Adra, northeast of Damascus, attacking buildings housing workers and their families. The fighters were reported to have targeted Alawites, Druze, Christians and Shiites, killing them for sectarian motives. Some people were shot while others were beheaded. The killings lasted into the next day. 15–19 minority civilian deaths were documented by the Syrian Observatory for Human Rights, amidst claims that as many as 40 were killed and many families abducted. 18 pro-government militia were also killed, including five Palestine Liberation Army (PLA) members. Several terrorists died when a Shiite man detonated a hand grenade, killing himself, the terrorists and members of his family, after the terrorists attempted to kill them.

== Government operation and death toll ==
On 13 December, the military surrounded Adra and started an operation to push out terrorist fighters from the area, making advances in the town during the day. As of the next day, the operation was still continuing.

By 15 December, the number of minority civilians confirmed killed in the terrorist attack on Adra had risen to 32. Dozens of others were missing. The Syrian military claimed more than 80 people were killed by Islamic terrorists, while the Syrian Foreign Ministry put out a figure of more than 100 dead.

== Evacuation and recapture of Adra ==
On 30 December, reports said that the Syrian army evacuated around 5,000 people from Adra, while on 31 December, the government news agency reported that more people were evacuated, bringing the total number of evacuees to more than 6,000.

By mid-January, the Syrian government had reportedly regained control of the industrial area of Adra. In late September 2014, the Army recaptured the town.

== See also ==
- 2025 massacres of Syrian Alawites
- List of massacres during the Syrian Civil War
