= Hawsh al-Dawahira =

Hawsh al-Dawahira حوش الضواهرة
- Village
- Location in Syria
- Coordinates: 33°32′49″N 36°27′42″E
- Country: Syria
- Governorate: Rif Dimashq
- District: Douma District
- Subdistrict: Douma District

Population (2004)
  - Total: 3,415
- Time zone: UTC+2 (EET)
  - Summer (DST): UTC+3 (EEST)
- City Qrya Pcode: C2332

Hawsh al-Dawahira (also spelled Hosh Eldawahreh; Arabic: حوش الضواهرة) is a Syrian village located in Douma District. Hawsh al-Dawahira had a population of 3,415 in the 2004 census.
