= Syrian towns and villages depopulated in the Arab–Israeli conflict =

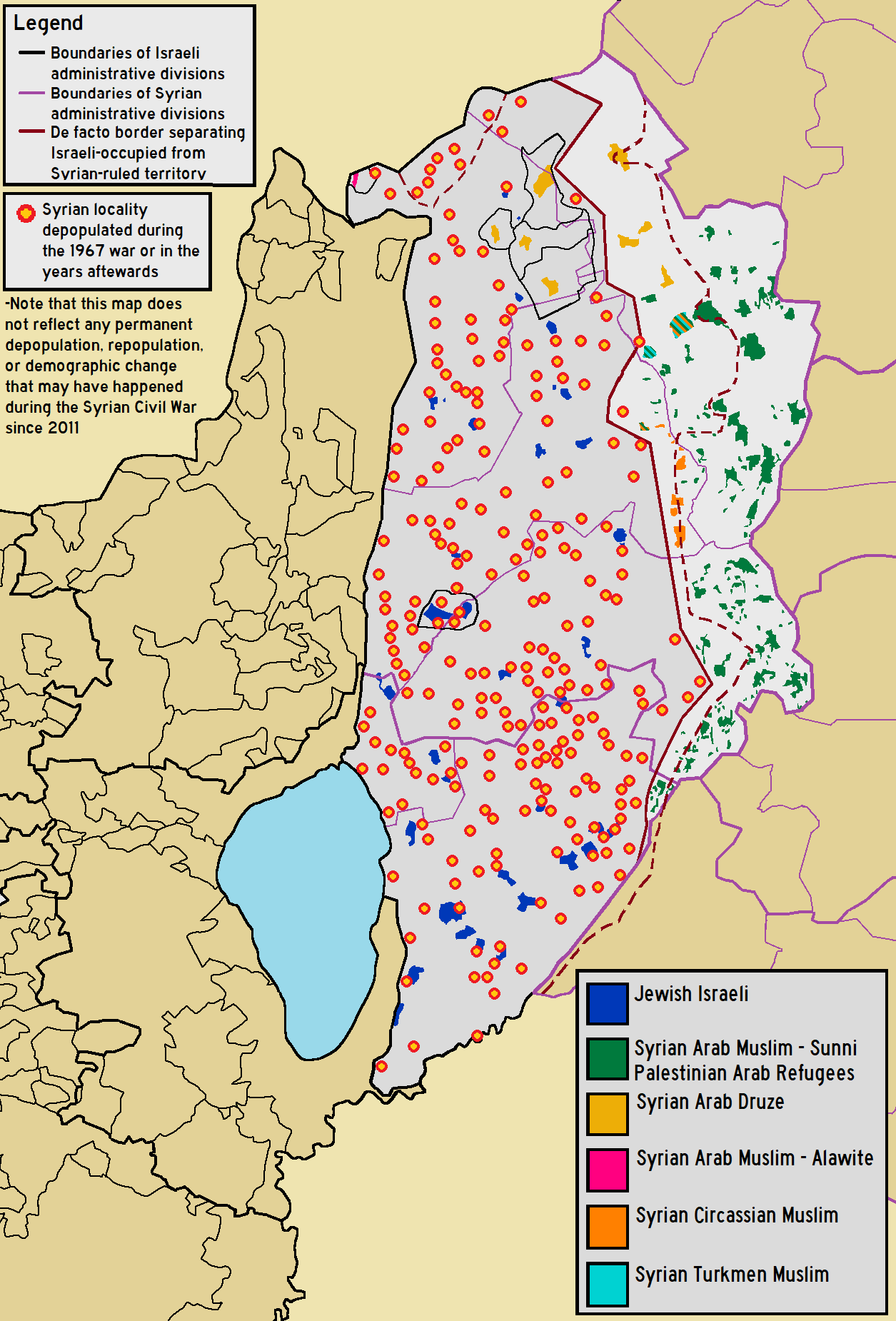
Map of location of Syrian localities whose residents have been displaced since 1967 overlaid on top of the modern demographic map of the area

Before the Six-Day War and Yom Kippur War, the Golan Heights comprised 312 inhabited areas, including 2 towns, 163 villages, and 108 farms. In 1966, the Syrian population of the Golan Heights was estimated at 147,613. Israel seized about 70% of the Golan Heights in the closing stages of the Six-Day War. Many of these residents fled during the fighting, or were driven out by the Israeli army, and some were evacuated by the Syrian army. The Washington Report on Middle East Affairs in 1992 characterized Israel's actions as "ethnic cleansing".

Israel forcibly expelled Syrians from the Golan Heights. There were also instances of Israeli soldiers killing Syrian residents including blowing up their home with people inside.

A cease-fire line was established and large parts of the region came under Israeli military control, including the town of Quneitra, about 139 villages and 61 farms. Of these, the Census of Population 1967 conducted by the Israeli Defence Forces listed only eight, including Quneitra. One of the remaining populated villages, Shayta, was partially destroyed in 1967 and a military post built in its place. Between 1971 and 1972 it was eradicated, with the remaining population forcibly transferred to Mas'ade, another of the populated villages under Israeli control. Focaal reports that "95% of the Syrian indigenous population was forcibly displaced and only five villages, out of 340 villages and farms, remained."

The Israeli Head of Surveying and Demolition Supervision for the Golan Heights proposed the demolition of 127 depopulated villages, with about 90 abandoned villages to be demolished shortly after May 15, 1968. The demolitions were carried out by contractors hired for the job. After the demolitions, the lands were given to Israeli settlers. There was an effort to preserve buildings of archaeological significance and buildings useful for the planned Jewish settlements.

After the 1973 Yom Kippur War, parts of the occupied Golan Heights were returned to Syrian control, including Quneitra, which had changed hands several times during the war. According to a United Nations Special Committee, Israeli forces had deliberately destroyed the city before their 1974 withdrawal.

In 2024, after Israel expanded its occupation of the Golan Heights, Israel attempted to forcibly depopulate several Syrian villages in the newly occupied area. Israel began destroying the electricity and water networks in the villages in an attempt to force residents out of their homes. On 18 December, it was reported that over 100 Syrian families had been forcibly expelled from the Golan Heights by the Israeli military. Witnesses describe that Israeli soldiers had opened fire on them and on their homes. The United Nations peacekeepers have been removing Israeli flags in the newly occupied area. On 19 December, it was reported that the IDF had banned local farmers from accessing their own fields. A resident of the village of Maariyah told the Associated Press that the Israeli Military "is demanding that we hand over all weapons to the occupation. We told them that we have no weapons at all."

== Depopulated and demolished towns and villages ==
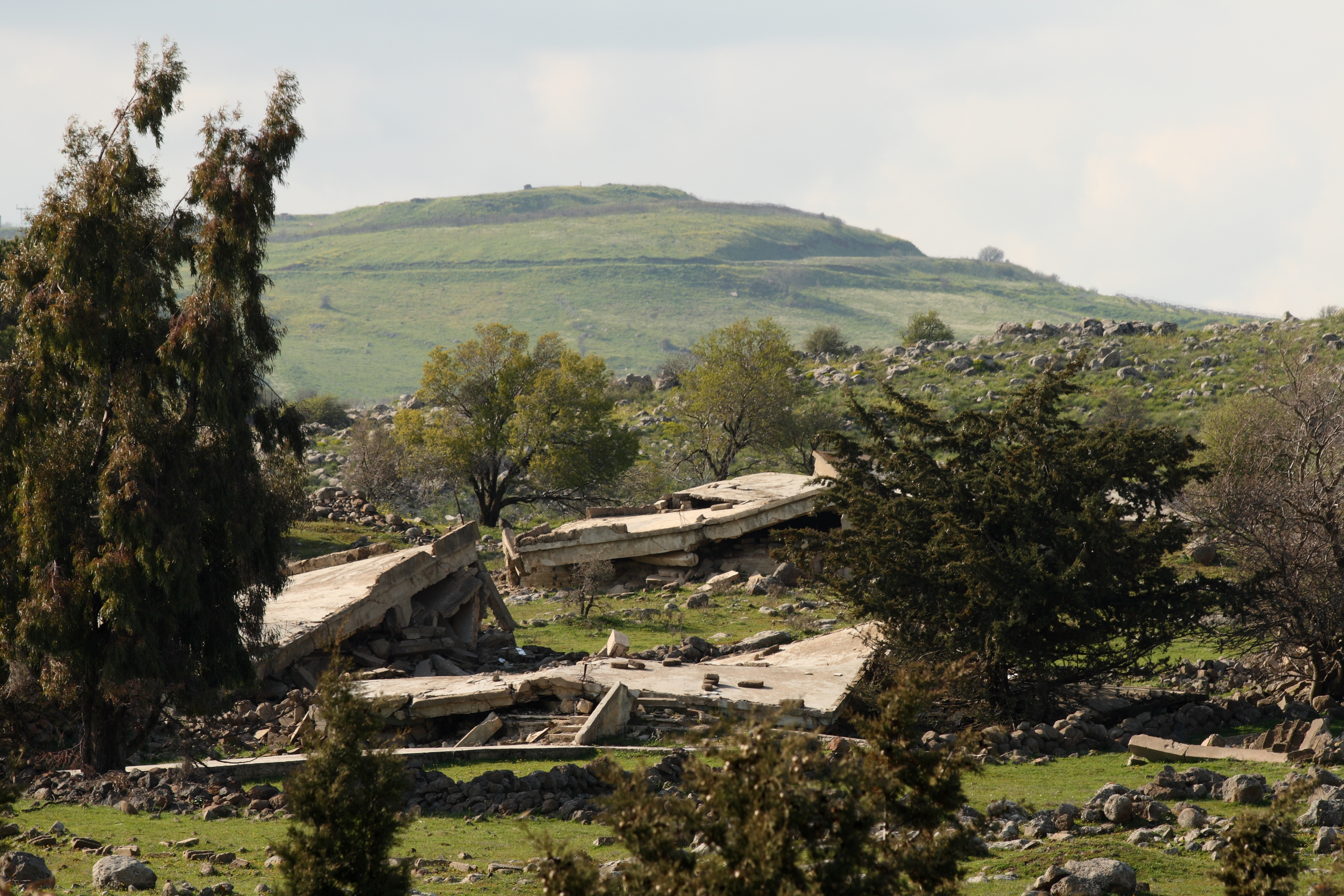
Destroyed buildings in Quneitra

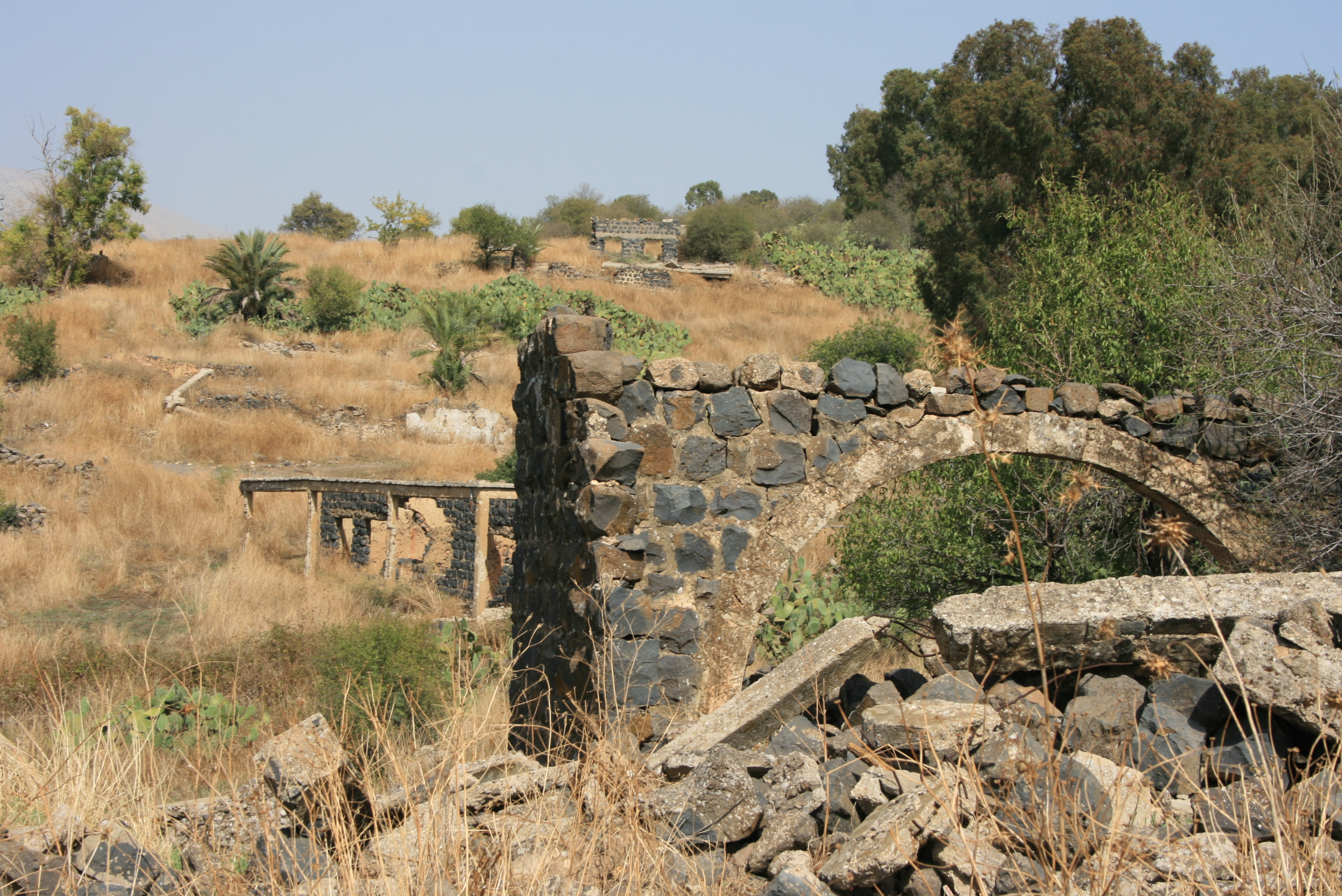
Ruins at 'Ayn Fit

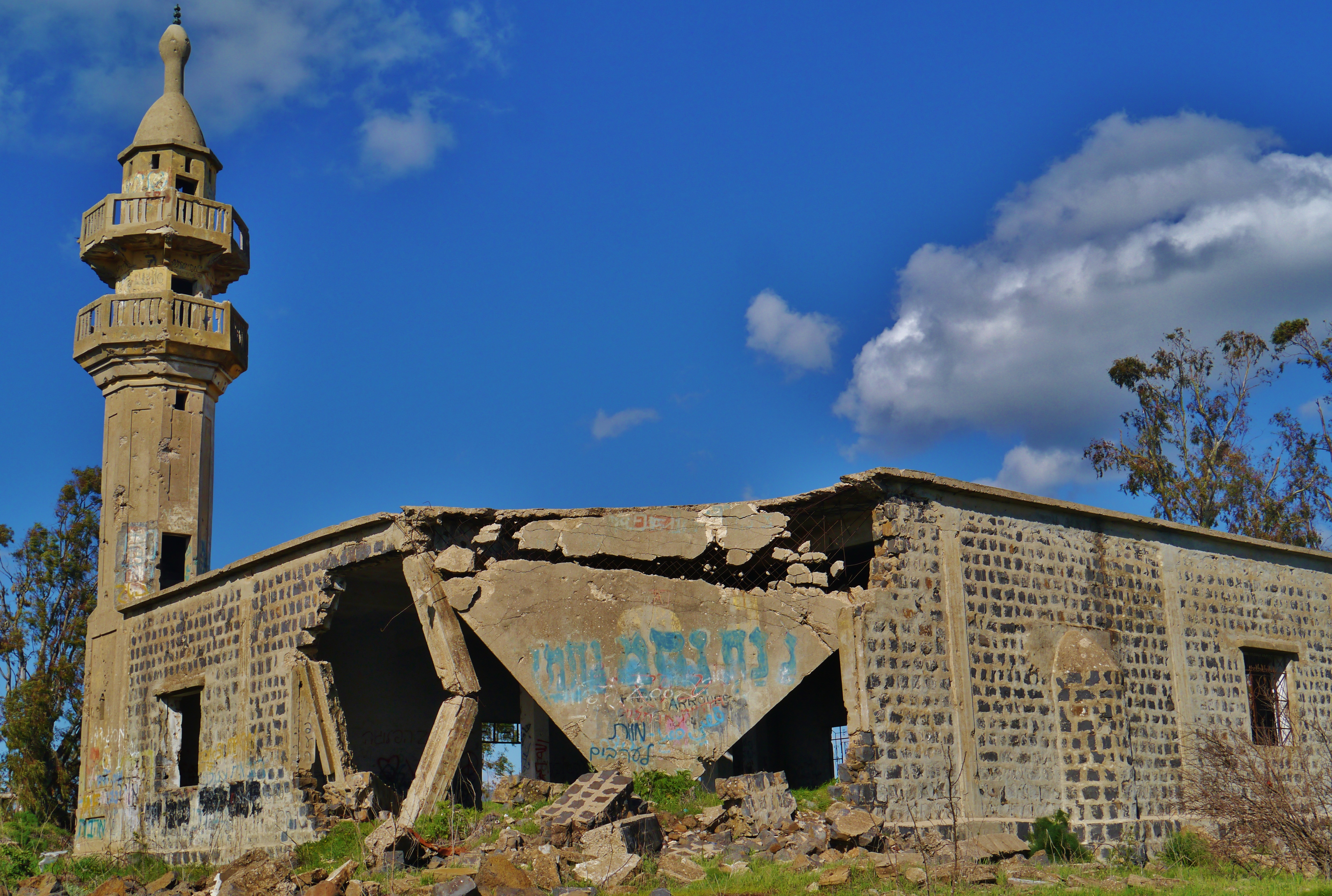
Destroyed Mosque in Khishniyah

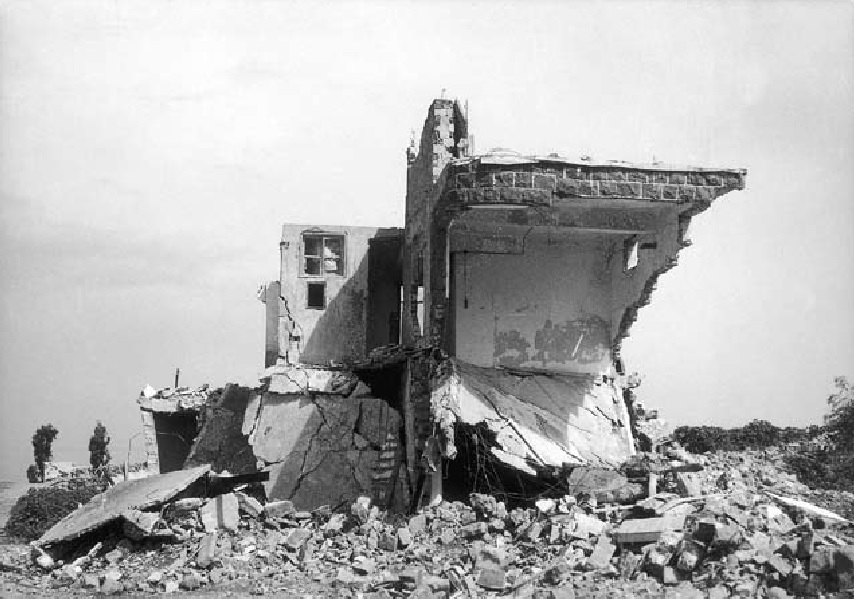
Demolition of a two-storied house in Fiq, 1967

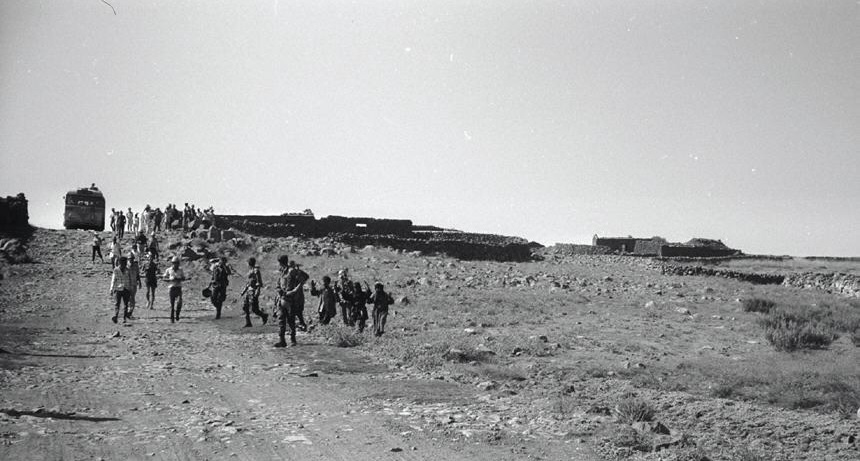
Forced transfer and displacement. Syrian civilians, hands raised, before Israeli soldiers, leave their homes in the Golan Heights

=== Depopulated villages ===
Alphabetical list; all parts of the name are treated equally, including the article (al-, as-, etc.), but the diacritics are disregarded (for example ‘A is treated like a plain A). Caution: some names appear twice in different orthographic variations, originating from different sources.

English	Arabic
Al-'Ameriya (Isbetta)	العامرية (اسبتّة)
Abu Kheit	أبو خيط
Abu Tuleh (or Abu Foula)	أﺑﻮ ﻓﻮﻟﺔ
Al-Ahmadiyah	الاحمدية
Al ‘Al	اﻟﻌﺎل
Al Slouqiya al Gharbiya	اﻟﺴﻠﻮﻗﻴﺔ اﻟﻐﺮﺑﻴﺔ
Al Slouqiya al Sharqiya	اﻟﺴﻠﻮﻗﻴﺔ اﻟﺸﺮﻗﻴﺔ
‘Almin	علمين
'Amret al-Freij	عمرة الفريج
‘Amoudiya	ﻋﻤﻮدﻳا
ِAl-Arba‘in	الاربعين
Al-Asaliyah	العسلية
‘Ayn al-Hamra	عين الحمرة
‘Ayn al-Qura	ﻋﻴﻦ اﻟﻘﺮى
‘Ayn as Sumsun	ﻋﻴﻦ ﺳﻤﺴﻢ
‘Ayn al-Tina	عين التينة
‘Ayn ‘Ayshah	عين عيشه
'Ayn Fit	ﻋﻴﻦ ﻓﻴﺖ
‘Ayn Maymun	عين ميمون او عين مامون
‘Ayn Sa‘d	ﻋﻴﻦ ﺳﻌﺪ
‘Ayn Ziwan	ﻋﻴﻦ زﻳﻮان
'Eshshe	عشّة
‘Azaziyat	ﻋﺰﻳﺰﻳﺎت
ِAl-Bajjah	البجة
Banias	بانياس
Al-Barjeiat	البرجيات او البرقيات
Basset Al Jawkhadar	بصة الجوخدار
Battah	بطّاح
Bir al-Shquq	ﺑﻴﺮ اﻟﺸﻘﻮق
Al-Bjuriyah	اﻟﺒﺠﻮرﻳﺔ
Dabbousyah	دﺑﻮﺳﻴا
Dabburah	دﺑﻮرة
ِAl-Dalhamieh	الدلهمية
Al-Dalwa	الدﻟﻮة
Deir mfaddel	دير مفضل
Deir Raheb	دير راهب
Deir Sras	دﻳﺮ ﺳﺮاس
Al-Derdara	دردارة
Al-Doka	الدوكة
‘Eshsha	اﻟﻌﺸﺔ
Fahham	ﻓﺤﻢ or اﻟﻔﺤﺎم
Faraj	اﻟﻔﺮج
Fazarah	فزرة
Fiq	ﻓﻴﻖ
Furn	ﻔﺮن
Al-Ghadhriya	الغادرية
Ghzayil	غزيّل
Hafar	ﺣﻔﺮ
Al-Hamidiyah (repopulated after 1974)	الحميدية
Hetal	ﺣﻴتل
Al-Huseiniyah	الحسينية
Huwaylizah	?
‘Ullayqa	ﻋﻠﻴﻘﺔ
Jraba	ﺟﺮﺑﺎ or ﺟﺮاﺑﺔ
Jokhadar	اﻟﺠﺤﺪر or اﻟﺠﻮﺧﺪر
Jbab al-Mis	ﺟﺒﺐ اﻟﻤﻴﺲ
Jurniyya	ﺟﺮﻧﻴﺔ
Jlaybina	ﺟﻠﻴﺒﻴﻨﺔ
Jubata ez-Zeit	ﺟﺒﺎﺗﺎ اﻟﺰﻳﺖ
Jibin	ﺟﺒﻴﻦ
Jubet Ra’abana	جبة رعبنه
Jurmaya	جرمايه
Al-Juwayzah	الجويزة
Juwayzah al-Shamaliya	ﺟﻮﻳﺰة اﻟﺸﻤﺎﻟﻴﺔ or ﺟﻮﻳﺰة واﺳﻂ
Kafr Alma	ﻛﻔﺮ اﻟﻤﺎ
Kafr ‘Aqab	ﻛﻔﺮ ﻋاﻘﺐ
Kafr Hareb	ﻛﻔﺮ حارب
Kafr Naffakh	ﻛﻔﺮ ﻧﻔّﺎخ
Kabbash	كباش
Khisfin	ﺧﺴﻔﻴﻦ
Khokha	ﺧﻮﺧﺔ
Khueikha	خويخة
Khushniyeh	ﺧﺸﻨﻴﺔ
Kisrin or Qisrin	ﻗﺼﺮﻳﻦ
Krejz al Wawi	كريز الواوي
ِِAl-Kursi	اﻟﻜﺮﺳﻲ
Ma‘barah	?
Majduliyah	مجدولية
ِِAl-Malsa'	الملسا
Mamwayra	ﻣﻤﻮﻳﺮة
ِAl-Mansura	المنصورة
Mashfa‘	ﻣﺸﻔﻊ
ِAl-Mashta (Beira)	اﻟﺒﻴﺮة
Al-Mesa’diya	المسعدية
ِAl-Mihjar	اﻟﻤﺤﺠﺎر
Al-Mishirfawy	المشيرفاوي
Mjeihiya	مجيحية
Momsieh (Ghassaniyah)	ﻣﻤﺴﻴﺔ
Al-Mudariya (Qahtaniya)	المودرية
ِAl-Mughayyir	المغيّر
Mughr Shab’a	ﻣﻐﺎر ﺷﺒﻌﺔ ُﻣﻐﺮ or ﺷﺒﻌﺔ
Muwaysah or Mghar Muwaysah	ﻣﻐﺎر ﻣﻮﻳﺴﺔ
Nab	ناب
ِAl-Nuqeib	اﻟﻨﻘﻴﺐ
Na‘ran	ﻧﻌﺮان
Nukhaylah	ﻧﺨﻴﻠﺔ
Al-Qadiriyah	القادرية
Qafira	ﻗﻔﻴﺮة
Qarahta	ﻗﺮﺣﺘﺎ
ِAl-Qara‘na (Qal' al Qara‘inah)	ﻗﺮاﻋﻨﺔ
Al-Qerniyat	القرنيات
َQala‘	قلع
Al-Qila‘	القلع
Al-Quneitra	القنيطرة
Qunna‘ba	ﻗﻨﺎﺑﺔ or اﻟﻘﻨﻌﺒﺔ
Al-Qusbiyah	القصبية
Qusbyah al-Jadidah	قصيبة الجديدة
Al-Rafeed	اﻟﺮﻓﻴﺪ
Er-Ramthaniyye	اﻟﺮﻣﺜﺎﻧﻴﺔ
Rawiyah	راوﻳﺔ
Al-Razzaniya (central Golan)	الرزّانية
Al-Razzaniya (southern Golan)	الرزّاﻧﻴﺔ
Al-Ruwayhinah	الرويحينة
Al-Sanabir	ﺳﻨﺎﺑﺮ
Surruman, Surman	ﺻﺮﻣﺎن
Shabbah	ﺷّﺒه
Al-Shaikh ‘Ali (Qtu‘ al-Shaikh ‘Ali)	الشيخ ﻋﻠﻲ (قطوع الشيخ علي)
Shayta	سحيتا
Shkoum (Bir al-Shkoum)	شكوم (بير الشكوم)
Shqeif (Qisrin)	شقيف قصرين
Shuqayif (Wadi al-Samak)	شقيف وادي السمك
Al-Sindiyanah	السنديانة
Skoufiya	ﺳﻜﻮﻓﻴا
Sukayk	ﺳﻜﻴﻚ
ِِAl-Summaqah	ﺳﻤﺎﻗﺔ or اﻟﺴﻤﺎﻗﺔ
Tal A'war	تل اعور
Tannuriyah	تنّوريا
Umm al-Dananir	ام اﻟﺪﻧﺎﻧﻴﺮ
‘Uyun al Hajal	ﻋﻴﻮن اﻟﺤﺠﻞ
Wasit	واﺳﻂ
Al-Yahoudiya, al-Ya'rubiyya	اﻟﻴﻬﻮدﻳﺔ, اليعربية
Al-Yaqusah	اﻟﻴﺎﻗﻮﺻﺔ
Z‘arta	زﻋﺮﺗﺎ
Za'ura	زﻋﻮرة

=== Depopulated farms ===
Alphabetical list; all parts of the name are treated equally, including the article (al-, as-, etc.), but the diacritics are disregarded (for example ‘A is treated like a plain A).

English	Arabic
Abaret Hamed	
‘Abbasiya	ﻋﺒﺎﺳﻴﺔ
Abu Darkal	
Al Hamma	
‘Ayn Addisa, 'Adeisa	عديسة
‘Ayn Hur	ﻋﻴﻦ ﺣﻮر
‘Ayn Warda	
Bab al Hawa	ﺑﺎب اﻟﻬﻮى
Al-Baghghala, or Baghghalat al-Jokhadar	البغالة، بغالة الجوخدار
al-Batra	البترة
Bitmiyya	اﻟﺒﻄﻤﻴﺔ
Darbashiyah	
Dardara	
Deir ‘Aziz	دﻳﺮ ﻋﺰﻳﺰ
Deir Kurouh	
Deir Ma’dal	
Dreijat	
Fakhurah	
Fashkoul	
Hajaf	
Hashra	
Houtieh	
‘Illayqa Jaunoubieh	
Jimieh	
Kafweh	
Kanaf	
Karaz at Tawil (or Farez Tawil)	ﻗﺮز اﻟﻄﻮﻳﻞ (or ﻓﺮز اﻟﻄﻮﻳﻞ)
Kharab Bikheil	
Khilet Gazaleh	
Khirbet Beida	
Khshash	
Kureinat	
Kurn	
Kuseir	
Lawieh	
Mabra	
Majdoulieh	
Mansurah	ﻣﻨﺼﻮرة
Marah Muloul	
Mazra'at Alqunetra (or Kantarat Kharab?)	
Mazra‘at Barakhta	
Mazra’at Himeira	
Mazra'at Izdin	
Mazra’at Kalak (or Falq?)	
Mazra’at Sheikh Hasan	
Mazra Um al Tawahin	
Minshieh	
Mudawara	
Musha’an	
Nasriya	
Nkib Arabieh	
Nkib Sourieh	
Nuwanieh	
Qisbiya	اﻟﻘﺼﻴﺒﺔ
Qtua Sheikh Ali	
Rab’a	
Rajam	
Ramtha	
Rasm Balut	
Saffuriyah	ﺻﻔﻮريه
Al-Sha’abaniya	الشعبانية
Sa‘id	
Sagireh	
Shamra	
Shoka	
Sir Dhi'ab	ﺳﻴﺮ ادﻳﺎب
Sir el-Kharfan	ﺳﻴﺮ اﻟﺨﺮﻓﺎن
Slayeh	
Sleileh	
Taibe	
Tawahin	
Umm Kanater	ام القناطر
Umm Khashabeh	
Umm Sudra	
Uyun	
Uweinat Jaunoubieh	
Uweinat Shamalieh	
‘Uyun Hadid	
'Uyun Samak	
Zibdin	
Zor Abu Kabzeh	

== See also ==
- Ethnic cleansing
- Depopulated Palestinian locations in Israel
- List of villages depopulated during the Arab–Israeli conflict
- Population transfer

== Bibliography ==
- Sulimani, Gideon; Kletter, Raz (2022). "Settler-Colonialism and the Diary of an Israeli Settler in the Golan Heights: The Notebooks of Izhaki Gal". Journal of Holy Land and Palestine Studies. 21 (1). Edinburgh University Press. doi:10.3366/hlps.2022.0283. ISSN 2054-1988.
