= Er-Ramthaniyye =

Depopulated Syrian village in the Golan Heights

Er-Ramthaniyye رﻣﺴﺎﻧﻴﺔ or اﻟﺮﻣﺜﺎﻧﻴﺔ
- Village
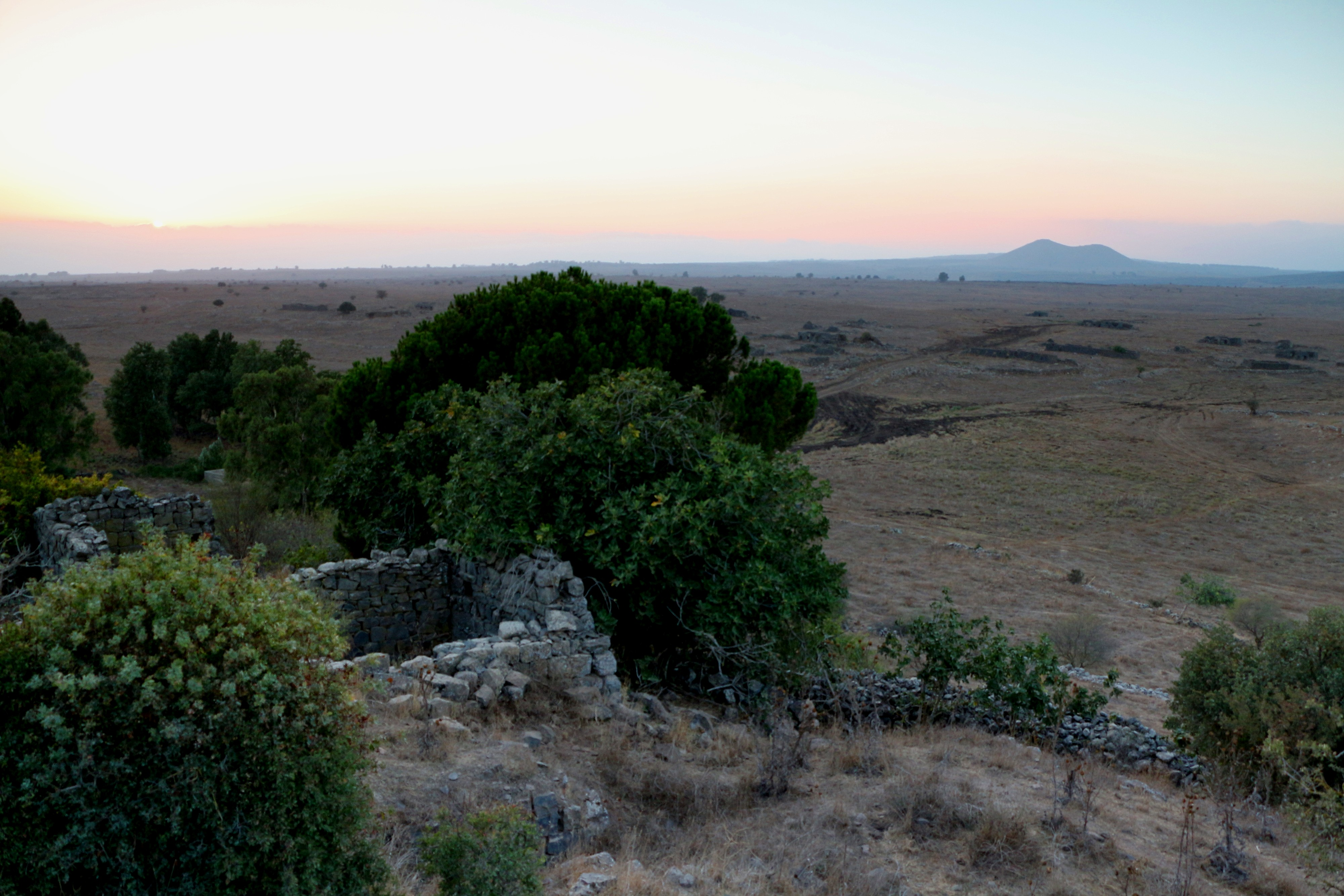
- Ruins at Er-Ramthaniyye

- Location within the Golan Heights
- Coordinates: 33°1′18″N 35°48′20″E
- Grid position: 225/269 PAL
- Country: Syria
- Governorate: Quneitra
- District: Quneitra
- Region: Golan Heights
- Destroyed: 1967

Population
  - Total: 1,304

Er-Ramthaniyye (Arabic: رﻣﺴﺎﻧﻴﺔ or اﻟﺮﻣﺜﺎﻧﻴﺔ), or Ramsaniyye is a former Syrian village located in the Golan Heights.

== History ==
The village's structures are situated on a volcanic hill and extend into the surrounding valley. Eleven water sources were found in the vicinity. The two principal ones used by the former village are a large pool to the east and a spring to its north.

The name is Aramaic, and means "small hill".

=== Proto-history ===
Half a kilometer east of the village's hill, the remains of an Early Bronze Age settlement were found on a low ridge, covering an area of 1.7 hectares. Around er-Ramthaniyye, 83 dolmens were found. They are difficult to date, but generally associated with Bronze Age activity.

=== Herodian kingdom and Roman Empire ===
During the early Roman period, er-Ramthaniyye was the site of a small agricultural village, built on the southern and eastern slopes of the hill. It was perhaps founded in the 1st century BC as part of a settlement initiative in the Golan launched by Herod the Great, King of Judea. During this period, the surrounding area was predominantly Jewish. Er-Ramthaniyye may have been one of the villages in the district of the fortified city of Sogane, which Josephus places in the northern Golan.

From the Roman period, remains include reused walls, arcosolia tombs, and lamps reliefs carved on reused lintels. The site appears to have continued to be inhabited into the 2nd century AD. In the 3rd century AD, the area underwent economic decline. A watchtower, apparently built by Emperor Philip the Arab, was constructed in the mid-3rd century AD, possibly to defend against nomadic incursions.

The village is recorded as Ramathana (Ραμαθανα) in the Diocletianic boundary stones corpus, dated to c. 300 CE.

=== Late Roman and Byzantine Empire ===
Er-Ramthaniyye was inhabited by Christians in the late Roman and Byzantine eras. Excavations have revealed a chapel, burial cave and sherds from the Late Roman era. Christian Greek inscriptions and tombstones from the Byzantine period with Greek inscriptions have also been discovered. No remains from other religious groups have been found from this period.

In 377 AD, a sanctuary for John the Baptist was established inside a monastery at Er-Ramathiniyye. This date is confirmed by two Greek inscriptions, which record the construction by Flavius Naaman, an ordinarius of a military unit, and mention the date (using the Seleucid calendar) and its dedication to John. It is possible that John's remains were brought to the site after his tomb at Sebaste was destroyed between 362 and 364 AD. The sanctuary was often visited by Ghassanids, and the village held annual celebrations for the saint. The area where their tents were erected, upon stone foundations which still remain, was located mostly east of the village. Ritual parades were also held there.

=== Middle Ages ===
Er-Ramthaniyye was abandoned following the Muslim conquest of the Golan in 636 AD. Except for a brief period of settlement during the Mamluk Sultanate, the site remained largely uninhabited throughout the Middle Ages. Until the 19th century, it was primarily used as pastureland by Bedouin tribes.

=== Modern period ===
The village was inhabited during the Ottoman era as a winter village. Transhumance shaped settlement in the Golan for centuries because of its harsh winters. The winters "forced tribespeople until the 19th century to live in hundreds of rudimentary 'winter villages' in their tribal territory. Starting in the second part of the 19th century, villages became "fixed and formed the nucleus of fully sedentary life in the 20th century Golan."

Between 1885 and 1887, Jewish settlers from Beit Yehudah (an organization of Jews from Safed with experience from Gei Oni) attempted to establish a settlement at er-Ramthaniyye with support from the British philanthropist Laurence Oliphant. The Jewish settlers lived and worked in a large structure where the ancient architectural elements were found. In 1886, Oliphant published a drawing of a Greek inscription and a date palm that had been sent to him by one of the settlers. Oliphant documented that there were 30 Jewish families in Ramthaniyye, with a person named Rozesweig as their manager, and that they did everything possible to raise money to purchase land in er-Ramthaniyye, including pledging their original homes as collateral and selling personal belongings, such as jewelry, and sending people to Damascus to handle the necessary kushans (official Ottoman documents). The settlers eventually left after two years due to difficulties with land registration, obtaining the kushans, and a lack of support beyond Oliphant's assistance.

Gottlieb Schumacher visited the site in the 1880s and documented crosses, ornaments and Greek inscriptions. Schumacher noted that the Sabarjah, a branch of the Nu'aym tribe, had 25 tents pitched around the village.

After Israel occupied the area in the Six-Day War, they began destroying Syrian villages in the Golan Heights. Ramthaniyye was destroyed in 1967. The population before the war was 1304.

== See also ==
- Syrian towns and villages depopulated in the Arab-Israeli conflict

== Bibliography ==
- Dauphin, Claudine; Gibson, Shimon (1994). "Exploring Ancient Settlements and Landscapes in the Golan / יישובים עתיקים וסביבתם בלב הגולן — תוצאותיהן של עשר שנות סקר (1978-1988)". Cathedra: For the History of Eretz Israel and Its Yishuv / קתדרה: לתולדות ארץ ישראל ויישובה (73): 3–25. ISSN 0334-4657.
- Ilan, Zvi (1987). "מאה שנות ניסיונות התיישבות יהודית בגולן" [One hundred years of Jewish settlement attempts in the Golan]. רמת הגולן (in Hebrew). Ariel Publications; Institute for Golan Studies. pp. 99–111.
- Sivan, Hagith (2008). Palestine in Late Antiquity. Oxford University Press. ISBN 9780191608674.
- Sulimani, Gideon; Kletter, Raz (2022). "Settler-Colonialism and the Diary of an Israeli Settler in the Golan Heights: The Notebooks of Izhaki Gal". Journal of Holy Land and Palestine Studies. 21 (1). Edinburgh University Press: 48–71. doi:10.3366/hlps.2022.0283. ISSN 2054-1988.
- Syon, Danny; David, Chaim Ben (2023). "A Boundary Stone from Kafr Nafaḥ and the Preservation of Ancient Place Names in the Northern and Central Golan Heights". 'Atiqot / עתיקות. 110. Israel Antiquities Authority / רשות העתיקות: 149–158. ISSN 0792-8424. JSTOR 27204906.
