= Harasta al-Qantarah =

Harasta al-Qantarah حرستا القنطرة
- Village
- Location in Syria
- Coordinates: 33°29′24.25″N 36°27′2.05″E
- Country: Syria
- Governorate: Rif Dimashq
- District: Markaz Rif Dimashq
- Subdistrict: Douma District

Population (2004)
  - Total: 2,513
- Time zone: UTC+2 (EET)
  - Summer (DST): UTC+3 (EEST)
- City Qrya Pcode: C2352

Harasta al-Qantarah (also spelled Harasta Elqantara; Arabic: حرستا القنطرة) is a Syrian village located in Markaz Rif Dimashq, Douma District. Harasta al-Qantarah had a population of 2,513 in the 2004 census.
