= Al-Shafuniyah =

Al-Shafuniyah الشفونية
- Village
- Location in Syria
- Coordinates: 33°33′23″N 36°26′44″E
- Country: Syria
- Governorate: Rif Dimashq
- District: Douma District
- Subdistrict: Douma District

Population (2004)
  - Total: 2,953
- Time zone: UTC+2 (EET)
  - Summer (DST): UTC+3 (EEST)
- City Qrya Pcode: C2334

بلدية الشفونية-Shafuniyah (Arabic: الشفونية) also spelled Al-Shifuniyah and Shafuniyeh, is a Syrian village located in the Douma District of Rif Dimashq. According to the Syria Central Bureau of Statistics (CBS), Al-Shafuniyah had a population of 2,953 in the 2004 census.
