= 'Ayn Fit =

Depopulated Syrian village in the Golan Heights

'Ayn Fit عين فيت
- Village
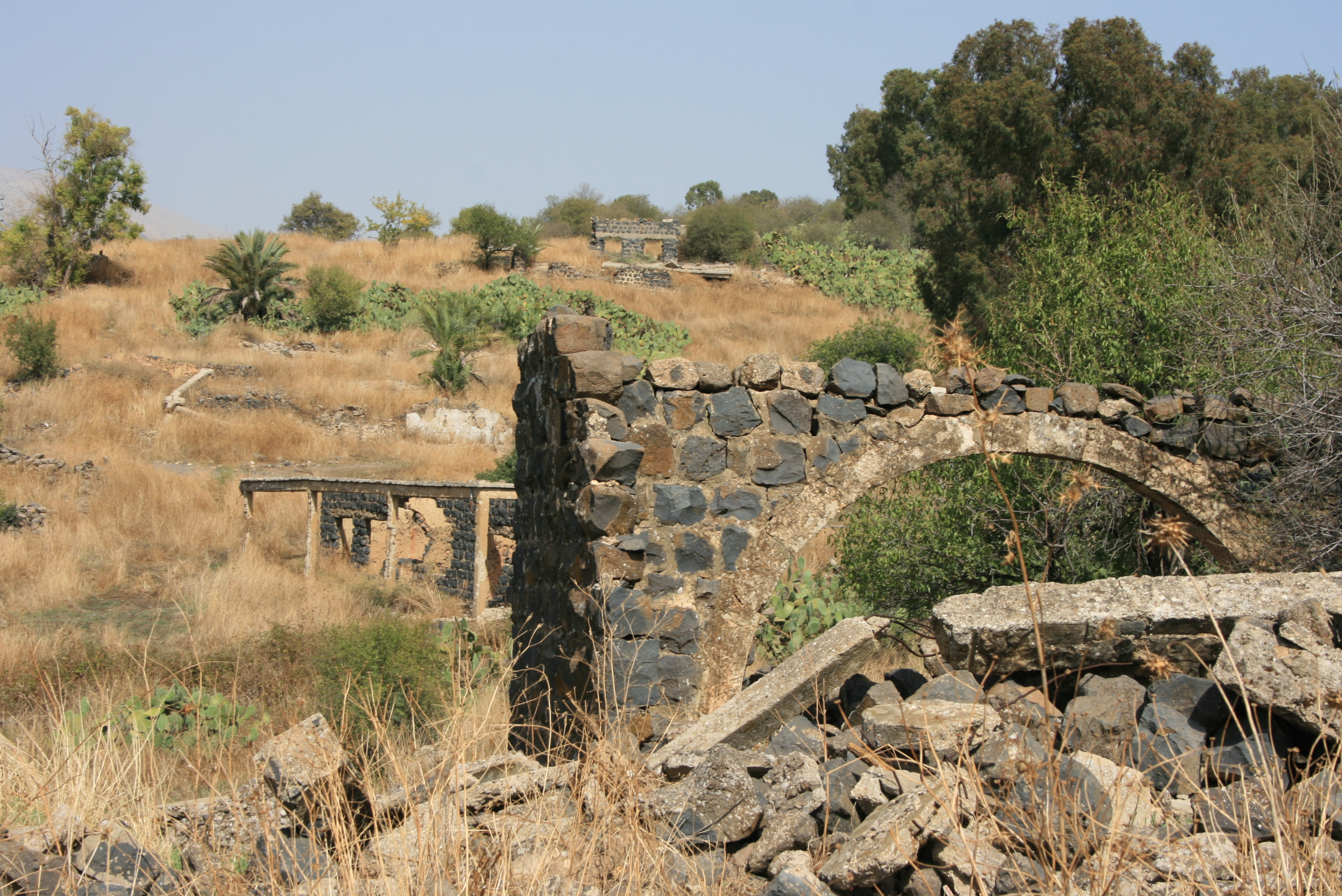
- Ruins at 'Ayn Fit

- 'Ayn Fit in Syria
- Coordinates: 33°13′26″N 35°42′15″E
- Palestine grid: 216/292
- Country: Syria
- Governorate: Quneitra
- District: Quneitra
- Region: Golan Heights
- Founded: 17th century
- Destroyed: 1967

Population
  - Estimate (1960s): 1,500

'Ayn Fit (Arabic: عين فيت), was a Syrian Alawite village situated in the northwestern Golan Heights.

== History ==
'Ayn Fit was established during the early 17th century. The German explorer Ulrich Jasper Seetzen visited 'Ayn Fit in 1806 during his travels in the region.

In 1838, Eli Smith noted 'Ayn Fit‘s population as Alawites.

Before the Six-Day War in 1967, it was one of three mainly Alawite villages in the Golan Heights, together with Za'ura and Ghajar. The population before the war was around 1500 people. The inhabitants were forcibly expelled during the Six-Day War, when Israel occupied the Golan Heights, and the village was destroyed by Israel.

== See also ==
- Syrian towns and villages depopulated in the Arab-Israeli conflict
