= Ghajar =

Village on the Lebanese-Syrian border

Ghajar غجر ע'ג'ר
- Ghajar seen from the Sheba'a Farms

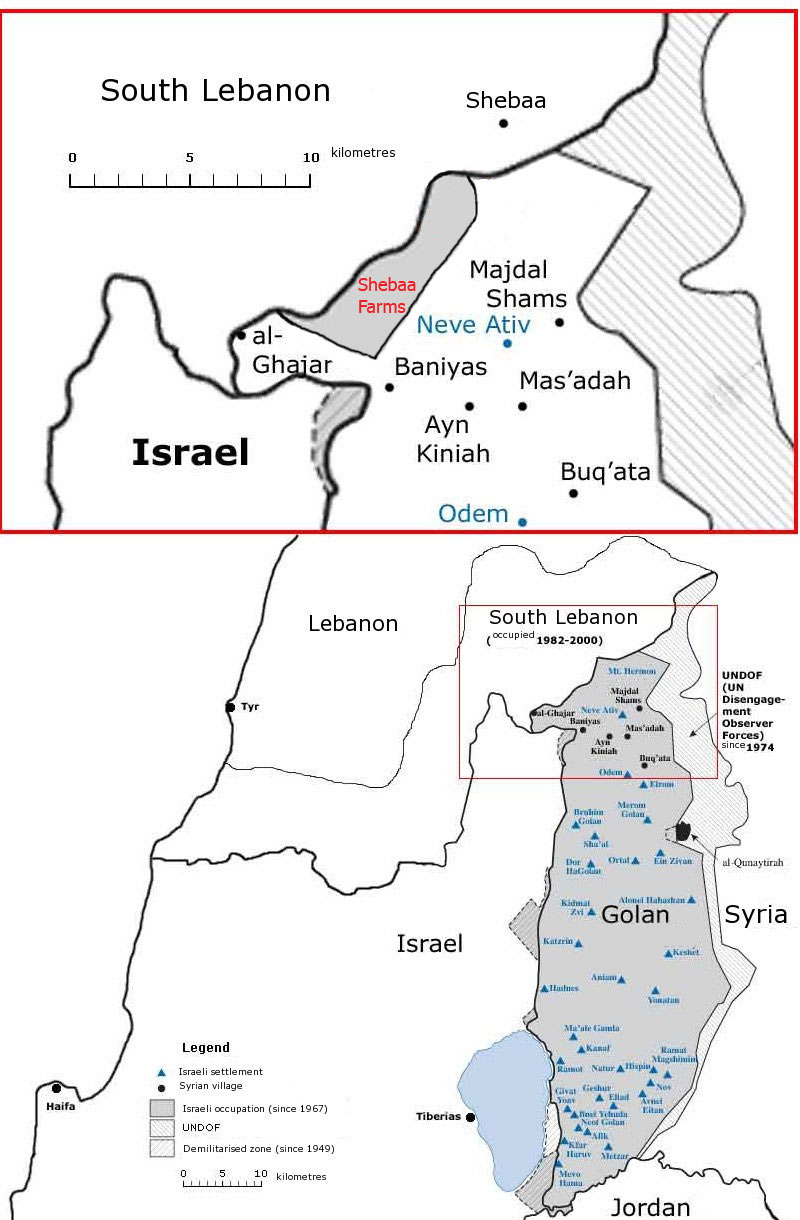
- Interactive map of Ghajar
- The Golan on the map of Syria; Ghajar on the map of the Golan. Ghajar (the Golan Heights)
- Grid position: 208/297 PAL
- Country: Syria (Southern); Lebanon (Northern)
- Occupation: Israel
- Syrian Governorate: Quneitra
- Syrian District: Quneitra
- Israeli District: Northern, Subdistrict: Golan
- Location: On the border between Lebanon and Israeli-occupied Golan Heights

Area
  - Total: 246 ha (610 acres)
- Elevation: 310 m (1,020 ft)

Population (2024)
  - Total: 2,738

Ghajar (Arabic: غجر; Hebrew: ע'ג'ר or רג'ר), also Rhadjar, is an Alawite-Arab village on the Hasbani River, on the border between Lebanon and the Israeli-occupied portion of the Golan Heights. The name of the village means "gypsy" in Arabic, and as of 2024, it had a population of 2,738. Many of the residents consider themselves Syrian, though they accepted Israeli citizenship after the area was annexed in 1981. Since then, residents of Ghajar have been integrated in Israeli society and speak fluent Hebrew, in addition to their native Arabic. The Blue Line divides Ghajar between Lebanon and the Golan Heights, although Israel has occupied the entire village since 2006. Israel considers it a part of its Northern District, in which its southern part is organized as a local council in the Golan Subdistrict.

== History ==
=== Early history ===
Houses from the old core of the village

Ottoman tax registers from 1535 record the settlement as Ṭranja, a name preserved in local tradition and likely reflecting an older Aramaic or pre-Arabic form (citron). The later Arabic name al-Ghajar appears to be an ethnonym referring to the site’s non-Arab inhabitants rather than a continuation of the original place name, illustrating a case in which demographic labeling replaced an earlier toponym while elements of the older name survived in oral memory and archival sources.

Control over Ghajar has changed hands many times. Three hundred years ago, the village was known as Taranjeh. It was renamed Ghajar under the rule of the Ottoman Empire, when the land was allegedly seized from the "villagers" by Kurds and forcibly sold. According to "local" legend, the Kurdish governor of Ghajar tried to ride his horse onto the tomb of a local holy man, Sheikh al-Arba'in. The horse refused and the following day a fire broke out, destroying the governor's shield and sword. The Kurds fled and quickly sold it back.

=== Modern era ===
In 1838, Eli Smith noted Ghajar‘s population as Alawites.

In 1932, the residents of Ghajar, predominantly Alawites, were given the option of choosing their nationality and overwhelmingly chose to be a part of Syria, which has a sizable Alawite minority. Prior to the 1967 Arab–Israeli War, Ghajar was considered part of Syria and its residents were counted in the 1960 Syrian census. Before the 1967 war, it was one of three mainly Alawite villages in the Golan Heights together with Za'ura and 'Ayn Fit.

==== Israeli occupation ====
Children in Ghajar in 1967

When Israel occupied the Golan Heights after capturing it from Syria in 1967, Ghajar remained a no-man's land for two and a half months. The Alawi villagers petitioned the Golan's Israeli governor to be attached to the occupied territory, as part of the Israeli-occupied Golan Heights, rather than Lebanon, because they considered themselves to be Syrians, like the majority of the native residents of the Golan at that time. Israel agreed to include Ghajar in its occupied territory of the Syrian Golan Heights.

In 1981, most Alawi villagers were pressured by authorities into Israeli citizenship under the Golan Heights Law which annexed the occupied Syrian territory to Israel, but the unilateral annexation was not recognized by the international community. After Operation Litani in 1978, Israel turned over its positions inside Lebanon to the South Lebanon Army and inaugurated its Good Fence policy. The United Nations Interim Force in Lebanon (UNIFIL) was created after the incursion, following the adoption of Security Council Resolution 425 in March 1978 to confirm Israeli withdrawal from Southern Lebanon, restore international peace and security, and help the government of Lebanon restore its effective authority in the area. Ghajar expanded northward into Lebanese territory, subsuming the Wazzani settlement north of the border.

In 1982, Israel invaded Lebanon. In 2000, following the campaign promise and election of Ehud Barak as Prime Minister, Israel withdrew their troops from Lebanon. In an attempt to demarcate permanent borders between Israel and Lebanon, the United Nations drew up what became known as the Blue Line. Due to Ghajar's location, wedged between Lebanon and the Israeli-occupied Golan Heights, the northern half of the village came under Lebanese control and the southern part remained under Israeli occupation.

Despite the Israeli withdrawal from Lebanon, tension mounted as Hezbollah made attempts to kidnap Israeli soldiers in the Ghajar area. In 2005, Hezbollah launched a missile on Ghajar and infiltrated it, but withdrew after being repelled by the Israelis. Following another attack in July 2006, Israel invaded southern Lebanon and re-occupied the northern half of Ghajar during the 2006 Lebanon War. Following a month of intense fighting, UNSC Resolution 1701 was unanimously approved to resolve the conflict, and it was accepted by combatants on both sides. Among other things, the resolution demanded the full cessation of hostilities, the withdrawal of Israeli forces, the disarming of Hezbollah, the deployment of Lebanese and UNIFIL soldiers, and the establishment of full control by the government of Lebanon.

==== Planned Israeli withdrawal ====
UN observation post by the village

In April 2009, the IDF agreed to withdraw from northern Ghajar at a meeting at Ras al-Naqoura. On 13 May, the government of Israel suspended talks to await the outcome of the Lebanese Parliamentary elections, fearing a Hezbollah victory. In the wake of reports in December 2009 of a possible splitting of the village, 2,200 Ghajar residents took to the streets in protest.

In November 2010, Israeli Prime Minister Benjamin Netanyahu informed the UN Secretary General of Israeli intentions to unilaterally withdraw from Ghajar, after failing to come to an agreement with Lebanon and place security matters into the hands of UNIFIL. On 17 November 2010, Security Cabinet of Israel voted in favor of withdrawal from northern half of Ghajar. Residents of Ghajar objected to division of the village.

As the Syrian Civil War erupted, Israel halted redeployment along the border. Israel continues to occupy the whole village and land adjacent to it which crosses the Blue Line.

==== Syrian civil war ====
In September 2022, the IDF lifted restrictions and Ghajar was opened to visitors from outside the village. Ever since, the town has become a tourist hotspot.

==== Gaza war ====
In the ongoing Gaza war, as Hezbollah targeted northern Israeli border communities, the IDF ordered the village residents to evacuate. Despite the IDF's order, the residents of Ghajar collectively decided not to evacuate.

== Citizenship ==
Village square with statue of Saint George and the Dragon

Residents on both sides of the village have Israeli citizenship; those in the northern half often hold passports from both Lebanon and Israel. They work and travel freely within Israel. There was an Israel Defense Forces checkpoint at the entrance to the village, and a fence surrounding the entire village, but no fence or barrier dividing the two sides of the village.

In 2011, Israel planned to withdraw from the northern part of the village to comply with UN resolutions, but locals protested against the move. Hussein Khatib, the Secretary for the Town Council, said he feared the UN would begin building a dividing wall in the village if the Israelis withdrew, and residents feared their ability to visit relatives and work in Israel would be impacted.

The checkpoint at the entrance to the village was removed in September 2022 after the Town Council constructed a border fence separating the entire village from Lebanon.

== Transportation ==
The Golan Regional Council operates eight buses per day from Ghajar to the Israeli city of Kiryat Shmona. The bus line begins at Ein Qiniyye. The bus ride to Kiryat Shmona takes approximately 17 minutes. Ghajar is connected to Israel's road system via Route 9970, which leads to kibbutz Snir.

== Economy ==
Fountain in the village's peace garden

Most residents of Ghajar work outside the village, many of them in Kiryat Shmona. In 2021, the village began to organize local tours and home hospitality, catering to small groups. In 2022, local officials reported 4,000 visitors per day.

== Cuisine ==
Culinary specialties of Ghajar include a dish called mitabla, made of grains of wheat and corn cooked in milk, and bisara, a stew of bulgur, chickpeas and fried onions thickened with flour. Bisara is usually served with a sauce of garlic and lemon.

== Voting Patterns ==
In the 2022 election, 56 percent of voters in Ghajar voted for the parties of the center-left coalition led by Yair Lapid, while 22 percent voted for the parties of the right-wing coalition led by Benjamin Netanyahu and 18 percent voted for the Arab parties.

In the 2026 election, 64 percent of voters in Ghajar voted for the parties of the center-left coalition led by Gadi Eisenkot, while 19 percent voted for the Arab parties and 9 percent voted for the parties of the right-wing coalition led by Benjamin Netanyahu. An additional 0.6 percent voted for the Reservists, and 3.6 percent voted for Amcha Yisrael. Voter turnout increased 87 percent from the 2022 election.

== The Blue Line ==
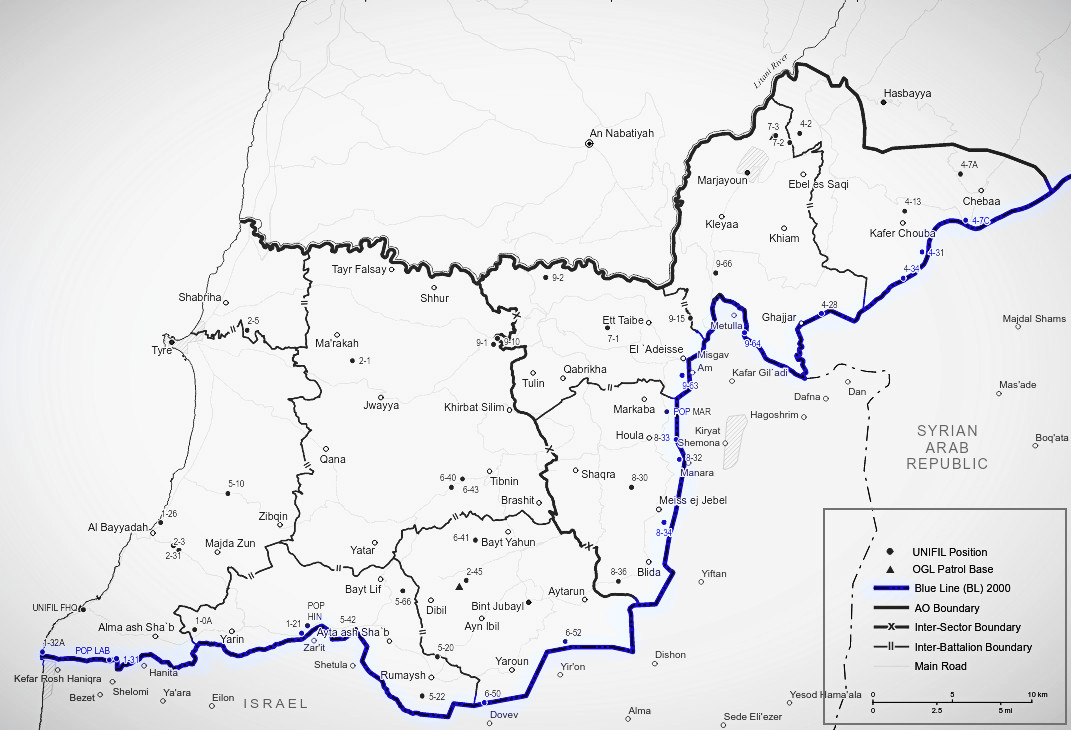
Map of the Blue Line that covers the Lebanese-Israeli border, with Ghajar on the right on the border

The UN has physically marked the recognized border between Lebanon and the Golan Heights. Israeli soldiers remain on the Lebanese side of Ghajar despite the decision of the Israeli cabinet on 3 December 2006, to hand it over to UNIFIL. Israel says that the Lebanese army rejected a UN-brokered proposal in which the Lebanese Army would protect the vicinity north of the village, while UNIFIL would be deployed in the village itself; this type of arrangement would be unique for UNIFIL in populated areas. A perimeter fence has been built along the northern edge of the village in Lebanese territory up to 800 meters north of the Blue Line. UNIFIL military observers patrol the area continuously.

In its October 2007 report on the implementation of the resolution, the United Nations issued a report stating that discussions on the duration of temporary security arrangements for northern Ghajar remained deadlocked. Israel remains in control north of the Blue Line and the small adjacent area inside Lebanese territory, although it does not maintain a permanent military presence there. The Lebanese Armed Forces patrol the road outside the perimeter fence. The report notes "so long as the Israel Defense Forces remain in northern Ghajar, Israel will not have completed its withdrawal from southern Lebanon in accordance with its obligations under resolution 1701 (2006)." It further notes: "Failure to make progress on this issue could become a source of tension and carry the potential for incidents in the future."

Asher Kaufman, a researcher from the University of Notre Dame, has disputed the Blue Line. Writing in Haaretz, he says there has never been an exact boundary agreed for Ghajar, citing conflicting maps and "sketches made by the US Embassy in Beirut". He says the village was incorrectly divided into two based on the assumption there were two villages: Ghajar in the south and al-Wazzani in the north, but that the latter "never really existed" in that location.

== Bibliography ==
- Conder, C.R.; Kitchener, H.H. (1881). The Survey of Western Palestine: Memoirs of the Topography, Orography, Hydrography, and Archaeology. Vol. 1. London: Committee of the Palestine Exploration Fund. (pp.87, 115)
- Guérin, V. (1880). Description Géographique Historique et Archéologique de la Palestine (in French). Vol. 3: Galilee, pt. 2. Paris: L'Imprimerie Nationale. (pp. 344–345)
- Hof, Frederic C. (2001). "A Practical Line: The Line of Withdrawal from Lebanon and Its Potential Applicability to the Golan Heights". Middle East Journal. 55 (1). Middle East Institute: 25–42.
- Kaufman, Asher (2002). "Who Owns the Shebaa Farms? Chronicle of a Territorial Dispute". Middle East Journal. 56 (4). Middle East Institute: 576–595.
- Kaufman, Asher (2009). ""Let Sleeping Dogs Lie": On Ghajar and Other Anomalies in the Syria-Lebanon-Israel Tri-Border Region". Middle East Journal. 63 (4). Middle East Institute: 539–560. doi:10.3751/63.4.11.
- Palmer, E.H. (1881). The Survey of Western Palestine: Arabic and English Name Lists Collected During the Survey by Lieutenants Conder and Kitchener, R. E. Transliterated and Explained by E.H. Palmer. Committee of the Palestine Exploration Fund.(p. 21)
- Robinson, E.; Smith, E. (1841). Biblical Researches in Palestine, Mount Sinai and Arabia Petraea: A Journal of Travels in the year 1838. Vol. 3. Boston: Crocker & Brewster. (pp. 342, 353 (the bridge) 2nd appendix, p. 136 (the place))
