= Battle of Marj Rahit (634) =

Conflict between the Rashidun Caliphate and Ghassanids

- Part of Muslim conquest of Syria
Date	24 April 634
Location	Marj Rahit, near modern Adra 33°36′13.92″N 36°31′3.21″E
Result	Rashidun Caliphate victory

Belligerents
Rashidun Caliphate	Ghassanids

Commanders and leaders
Khalid ibn al-Walid	Unknown

Strength
9,000	Unknown

Casualties and losses
Few	Few

The Battle of Marj Rahit (Arabic: معركة مرج راهط) was a minor conflict fought between the Ghassanid Arab allies of Byzantine Empire and the Rashidun army under the command of Khalid bin Walid in April 634. The morning after the Battle of Huwwarin, Khalid moved his army of 9000 towards Damascus.

Approximately 20 miles from Damascus there lies a pass with an elevation of 2000 feet above the surrounding countryside. The associated ridge is part of the range known as Jabal-ush-Sharq, which is an offshoot of the Anti-Lebanon Mountains and runs in a north-easterly direction to Tadmur. The pass itself, although not formidable, is quite long. Khalid stopped at the peak and planted his standard. As a result of this action, the pass became known as Saniyyat-ul-Uqab (ثنية العقاب), i.e. the Pass of the Eagle, after the name of Khalid's standard.

From that place, Khalid moved his army to Marj Rahit, a large meadow near the current city of Adra, northwest of Damascus.

== Battle ==
The battle took place on Easter Sunday, 24 April 634.

A large number of refugees from the region where Khalid had recently campaigned had gathered at Marj-al-Rahit, and these refugees mingled with the crowds celebrating the Easter festival. The Ghassanids were not unmindful of the danger that Khalid's entry into Syria posed for them and had positioned a strong screen of warriors on the route from Tadmur, below the pass. This force, however, was scattered quickly by the swift charge of Khalid's cavalry. Although some Ghassanid resistance continued as the Muslims advanced, it ceased once the main body of the Muslim army reached and raided the town. After collecting a large amount of booty and a number of captives, Khalid's forces left the town and returned to their encampment.

The battle itself was not a major battle but allowed Khalid's army to protect its rearguard and enabled them to progress their attack and besiege larger cities with relative ease.

== Aftermath ==
On the following morning, Khalid sent a mounted column towards Damascus with the task of raiding the Ghouta. After sending a messenger to Abu Ubaidah with instructions to report to him at Bosra, Khalid then set off for Bosra with the main body of the army, by-passing Damascus. The mounted column sent to Damascus reached the neighborhood of the city, picked up additional booty and captives, and then rejoined Khalid's main force while they were still on the march. The minor operations following Khalid's entry into Syria were now over. Khalid then moved to conquer Bosra city.

== General references ==
- Akram, A.I. The Sword of Allah: Khalid bin al-Waleed, His Life and Campaign, Nat. Publishing. House, Rawalpindi (1970) ISBN 0-7101-0104-X.
- Donner, F. (1981). The Early Islamic Conquests. Princeton University Press. pp. 124-125. ISBN 0-691-05327-8.
