= Mansura, Syria =

Mansura, (Arabic: ﻣﻨﺼﻮرة), is a former Syrian village located in the Golan Heights.

== History ==
The German-American archaeologist Gottlieb Schumacher surveyed the site in the 1880s and described it as: "A large Circassian village, near el-Kuneitrah" and having 400 residents.

In the late 1800s, the village was repeatedly attacked by Druze as a result of land disputes.

In the 1930s, there was a dispute over land in Mansura between the leader of the al-Fadl tribe and three Lebanese.

After Israel occupied the area in the Six-Day War, they began destroying Syrian villages in the Golan Heights. Mansura was destroyed in 1967. The village mosque was also destroyed by Israel.

== See also ==
- Syrian towns and villages depopulated in the Arab-Israeli conflict

== Bibliography ==
- Sulimani, Gideon; Kletter, Raz (2022). "Settler-Colonialism and the Diary of an Israeli Settler in the Golan Heights: The Notebooks of Izhaki Gal". Journal of Holy Land and Palestine Studies. 21 (1). Edinburgh University Press: 48–71. doi:10.3366/hlps.2022.0283. ISSN 2054-1988.
- ‘Abbasi, Mustafa; Seltenreich, Yair (2007). "A Leader on Both Sides of the Border: The Amir Fa'our al-Fa'our Between Syria and Mandatory Palestine". Holy Land Studies. 6 (1): 23–49. doi:10.3366/hls.2007.0013. ISSN 1474-9475.
