= Al-Adiliyah =

Al-Adiliyah العادلية
- Village
- Location in Syria
- Coordinates: 33°22′27″N 36°20′51″E
- Country: Syria
- Governorate: Rif Dimashq
- District: Markaz Rif Dimashq District
- Subdistrict: Al-Kiswah

Population (2004)
  - Total: 3,842
- Time zone: UTC+2 (EET)
  - Summer (DST): UTC+3 (EEST)

Al-Adiliyah (Arabic: العادلية) is a Syrian village located in Markaz Rif Dimashq District, Rif Dimashq. It is located in Western Ghouta. According to the Syria Central Bureau of Statistics (CBS), Al-Adiliyah had a population of 4,438 in the 2004 census. It is located in the Al-Kiswah subdistrict. To its west is Al-Horjelah.

== History ==
In 1838, Eli Smith noted el-'Adiliyeh as being located east of the Hajj road.

== Bibliography ==
- Robinson, E.; Smith, E. (1841). Biblical Researches in Palestine, Mount Sinai and Arabia Petraea: A Journal of Travels in the year 1838. Vol. 3. Boston: Crocker & Brewster.
