= Judaydat al-Khas =

Judaydat al-Khas جديدة الخاص
- Village
- Location in Syria
- Coordinates: 33°23′59″N 36°32′59″E
- Country: Syria
- Governorate: Rif Dimashq Governorate
- District: Douma District
- Nahiyah: Harran al-Awamid

Population (2004 census)
  - Total: 6,298
- Time zone: UTC+2 (EET)
  - Summer (DST): UTC+3 (EEST)

Judaydat al-Khas or Jdeidet el Khass (Arabic: جديدة الخاص) is a village in southwestern Syria in Rif Dimashq Governorate, close to Damascus International Airport. It is located southwest of Lake Otaybah and near the archaeological site of Tell Aswad, known to locals as The Black Hill. Some of the flints that have been found in the area of the village resemble those from the oldest levels of Tell Ramad. Wild boar is still herded in the nearby mountains today. According to the Syria Central Bureau of Statistics, Judaydat al-Khas had a population of 6,298 in the 2004 census.
