= Sakka, Rif Dimashq Governorate =

Sakka سكا Saqqa
- Village
- Location in Syria
- Coordinates: 33°26′0″N 36°27′22″E
- Country: Syria
- Governorate: Rif Dimashq Governorate
- Districts of Syria: Douma District
- Nahiyah: Al-Ghizlaniyah

Population (2004 census)
  - Total: 1,520
- Time zone: UTC+2 (EET)
  - Summer (DST): UTC+3 (EEST)

Sakka or Saqqa (Arabic: سكا) is a village to the southeast of Damascus, on the edge of the Ghouta, 5 kilometres (3.1 mi) north west of Damascus International Airport in Syria.

== Tell Sakka ==
Tell Sakka is a man-made tell in the neighborhood that has been excavated by Ahmed Taraqji on behalf of the Directorate-General of Antiquities and Museums.

Remains of a palace was found and dated to between 1800 and 1600 BCE. It has provided evidence of Egyptian influence in the Ghouta, The architectural remains were said to resemble those of Qatna and along with pottery were dated to the Middle Bronze Age. A courtyard was excavated measuring 14.5 metres (48 ft) by 22.5 metres (74 ft). Columns marked the entrance to the south and four large columns were positioned in a square in the centre of the courtyard. Tempera or perhaps Fresco technique Paintings were found on the walls showing ancient Egyptian style and motifs. However, beneath the apparent Egyptian scheme, a Near-Eastern tradition is evident in the ideas of the paintings.

The first cuneiform tablet recovered in the Damascus area was found at Tell Sakka. It was suggested resemble the style of cuneiform found in the archives of Mari and speaks of a king called Zimri-Lim. The cuneiform tablet in Sakka was translated to read "To my brother Zimri-lim, say "Thus saith Kanhilesu? Your brothers Samas and Dagan for the rest of the days, My brother sustenance? In front of me (it is) good. In front of my brother that is well! I heard: The enemy of my country brother, My brother has attacked, news of him that sent me! (...) inside a (?) [..., The army [of my country?], to my brother [(go go)]."

Other finds at the site included a sphinx made out of the scapula of a cow.
