= Al-Nashabiyah =

Town in southern Syria

Al-Nashabiyah النشابية
- Town
- Location within Syria
- Coordinates: 33°30′49″N 36°29′14″E
- Country: Syria
- Governorate: Rif Dimashq
- District: Douma
- Subdistrict: Al-Nashabiyah

Population (2004)
  - Total: 11,053
- Time zone: UTC+3 (EET)
  - Summer (DST): UTC+2 (EEST)

Al-Nashabiyah (Arabic: النشابية, also spelled Nashabieh) is a town in southern Syria, administratively part of the Rif Dimashq Governorate, located 19 kilometers east of Damascus city. Situated in the fertile Ghouta region, nearby localities include Beit Nayim and Outaya to the west, Marj al-Sultan to the southwest, al-Bilaliyah and Deir Salman to the southeast, al-Qasimiyah and al-Jarba to the east, al-Bihariyah to the northeast, Adra to the north and Hawsh al-Dawahira and Hawsh Nasri to the northwest. According to the Syria Central Bureau of Statistics, al-Nashabiyah had a population of 11,053 in the 2004 census. It is the administrative center of the al-Nashabiyah nahiyah ("subdistrict") which consists of 22 localities with a collective population of 76,814 in 2004.
