= Al-Abadah =

Al-Abadah العبادة
- Village
- Location in Syria
- Coordinates: 33°30′11″N 36°34′0″E
- Country: Syria
- Governorate: Rif Dimashq
- District: Markaz Rif Dimashq
- Subdistrict: Al-Nashabiyah

Population (2004)
  - Total: 6,385
- Time zone: UTC+2 (EET)
  - Summer (DST): UTC+3 (EEST)
- City Qrya Pcode: C2357

Al-Abadah (Arabic: العبادة) also spelled Obada or Abbadeh, is a Syrian village located in Markaz Rif Dimashq, Rif Dimashq to the southeast of the al-Nashabiyah nahiyah ("subdistrict"). According to the Syria Central Bureau of Statistics (CBS), Al-Abadah had a population of 6,385 in the 2004 census.
