= Za'ura, Syria =

Depopulated Syrian village in the Golan Heights

Za'ura زعورة Zaaoura
- Village
- Location within the Golan Heights
- Coordinates: 33.218845°N 35.709916°E
- Grid position: 218/285 PAL
- Country: Syria
- Governorate: Quneitra
- District: Quneitra
- Region: Golan Heights
- Destroyed: 1967

Za'ura (Arabic: زعورة), was a Syrian Alawite village situated in the northwestern Golan Heights.

The German explorer Ulrich Jasper Seetzen visited Za'ura in 1806 during his travels in the region.

In 1838, Eli Smith noted Za'ura's population as Alawites.

In 1888 the village consisted of 65 dwellings and 350 residents. They grew rice in the Hula marshes and tobacco around the village.

Before 1967, it was one of three mainly Alawite villages in the Golan Heights together with 'Ayn Fit and Ghajar. After Israel occupied the area in the Six-Day War, they began destroying Syrian villages in the Golan Heights. Za'ura was destroyed in 1967.

== See also ==
- Syrian towns and villages depopulated in the Arab-Israeli conflict

== Bibliography ==
- Sulimani, Gideon; Kletter, Raz (2022). "Settler-Colonialism and the Diary of an Israeli Settler in the Golan Heights: The Notebooks of Izhaki Gal". Journal of Holy Land and Palestine Studies. 21 (1). Edinburgh University Press: 48–71. doi:10.3366/hlps.2022.0283. ISSN 2054-1988.
