= Al-Ahmadiyah =

Abandoned Syrian village in the Golan Heights

El-Ahmediye الاحمدية
- Village
- Al-Ahmadiyah in Syria
- Coordinates: 33°0′2″N 35°42′3″E
- Grid position: 216/267 PAL
- Country: Syria
- Governorate: Quneitra
- District: Quneitra
- Subdistrict: Quneitra
- Region: Golan Heights
- Destroyed: 1968

El-Ahmediye (Arabic: الاحمدية, romanized: Al-Ahmadiyah) also known as el-Hamediyeh or Ammudiya, is a former Syrian village in the central Golan Heights, 15 kilometers southeast of Lake Hula. It was populated during the Israeli occupation of the Golan Heights during the 1967 Six-Day War. The village spread over two low-lying hills surrounded by springs. The Israeli settlement of Qatzrin was established two kilometres to the south. Al-Ahmadiyah's previous inhabitants had predominantly been Turkomans.

== History and archaeology ==
=== Archaeological investigation ===
The first archaeological survey of al-Ahmadiyah was undertaken by Gottlieb Schumacher in 1884. He noted that the villages stood at the foot of a hill, Shuwaikah, which contained ancient remains, dated by Schumacher to the Roman era, as indicated by the carved stone reliefs of Roman eagles and other animals. Another survey, in 1968, this time by Israeli archaeologist Shmarya Guttman, found items from the Hellenistic period, and more sherds from the Roman and Byzantine periods. Guttman determined that the size of the ancient settlement spanned 35 dunams.

=== Roman and Byzantine periods ===
Schumacher noted in 1884 the presence of zoomorphic stone reliefs from the Roman period, such as Roman eagles. The remains of two ancient synagogue have been discovered at al-Ahmadiyah, which is possibly the site of the ancient Roman Jewish settlement of Ecbatana. Several artifacts indicate Jewish settlement in the village during the 4th century CE, such as one containing a relief of nine-branched menorah.

=== Early Muslim period ===
Sherds dating to the Islamic era, particularly the Umayyad and Abbasid periods, were also found in the village.

=== Ottoman period ===
In 1596, Al-Ahmadiyah appeared in the Ottoman tax registers as al-Amudiyya; part of the nahiya of Butayha in the Sanjak of Hauran. It had an entirely Muslim population consisting of 15 households and 10 bachelors. The villagers paid a fixed tax rate of 25% on various agricultural products, including wheat (2100 akçe), barley (450), summer crops (450), goats and beehives (100), in addition to "occasional revenues"(100); a total of 3,200 akçe. All of the revenue went to a waqf.

Transhumance shaped settlement in the Golan for centuries because of its harsh winters. The winters "forced tribespeople until the 19th century to live in hundreds of rudimentary 'winter villages' in their tribal territory. Starting in the second part of the 19th century, villages like al-Ahmadiyah became "fixed and formed the nucleus of fully sedentary life in the 20th century Golan."

Schumacher noted in 1884 that the village, poorly built, was inhabited by some 70 Turkomans living in twelve hut-like houses. They cultivated various types of vegetables. It was situated at the bottom of a hill containing ruins known as Shuwaikah. The residents had utilized the stones of these ruins to build al-Ahmadiyah.

=== 1967 war and aftermath ===
Israel occupied al-Ahmadiyah and the Golan Heights after driving out the Syrian Army from the area during the Six-Day War in 1967. In 1968, it demolished the town as witnessed by United Nations military observers. A Syrian diplomatic representative issued a complaint about the village's destruction. During the Yom Kippur War, in October 1973, al-Ahmadiyah was one of three places where the Syrian Army launched major drives against as their forces moved across the Golan's mountainous plains. The other two places were Khishniyah and al-Rafid.

== See also ==
- Syrian towns and villages depopulated in the Arab-Israeli conflict

== Bibliography ==
- Applebaum, Shimon (1989). Judaea in Hellenistic and Roman times: historical and archaeological essays. BRILL Archive. ISBN 9004088210.
- Barker, A. J. (1980). Arab-Israeli Wars. Hippocrene Books. ISBN 9004088210.
- Hütteroth, W.-D.; Abdulfattah, K. (1977). Historical Geography of Palestine, Transjordan and Southern Syria in the Late 16th Century. Erlanger Geographische Arbeiten, Sonderband 5. Erlangen, Germany: Vorstand der Fränkischen Geographischen Gesellschaft. ISBN 3-920405-41-2.
- Ma'oz, Zvi Uri (2008). The Ghassānids and the fall of the Golan synagogues. Archaostyle.
- Schumacher, G. (1888). The Jaulân: Surveyed for the German Society for the Exploration of the Holy Land. Bentley and Son.
- Urman, Dan (1998). Ancient Synagogues: Historical Analysis and Archaeological Discovery. BRILL. ISBN 9004112545.
