= Hawsh Nasri =

Hawsh Nasri حوش نصري
- Village
- Location in Syria
- Coordinates: 33°33′28″N 36°28′23″E
- Country: Syria
- Governorate: Rif Dimashq
- District: Markaz Rif Dimashq
- Subdistrict: Al-Nashabiyah

Population (2004)
  - Total: 2,459
- Time zone: UTC+2 (EET)
  - Summer (DST): UTC+3 (EEST)
- Area codes: International code: 963, city code: 11
- City Qrya Pcode: C2329

Hawsh Nasri (Arabic: حوش نصري; also spelled Hosh Nasri) is a Syrian village located in Markaz Rif Dimashq, Rif Dimashq to the northwest of the Al-Nashabiyah nahiyah ("subdistrict"). According to the Syria Central Bureau of Statistics (CBS), Hawsh Nasri had a population of 2,459 in the 2004 census.
