= Al-Qasimiyah =

Al-Qasemiyeh القاسمية
- Village
- Location in Syria
- Coordinates: 33°30′30″N 36°30′46″E
- Country: Syria
- Governorate: Rif Dimashq
- District: Markaz Rif Dimashq
- Subdistrict: Al-Nashabiyah

Population (2004)
  - Total: 3,518
- Time zone: UTC+2 (EET)
  - Summer (DST): UTC+3 (EEST)
- City Qrya Pcode: C2356

Al-Qasimiyah (Arabic: القاسمية) also spelled Qasemiyeh, is a Syrian village located in Markaz Rif Dimashq, Rif Dimashq to the east of the Al-Nashabiyah nahiyah ("subdistrict"). According to the Syria Central Bureau of Statistics (CBS), Al-Qasimiyah had a population of 3,518 in the 2004 census.
