= Al-Jarba =

Al-Jarba الجربا
- Village
- Location in Syria
- Coordinates: 33°31′3″N 36°31′48″E
- Country: Syria
- Governorate: Rif Dimashq
- District: Markaz Rif Dimashq
- Subdistrict: Al-Nashabiyah

Population (2004)
  - Total: 2,172
- Time zone: UTC+2 (EET)
  - Summer (DST): UTC+3 (EEST)
- City Qrya Pcode: C2361

Al-Jarba (Arabic: الجربا) is a Syrian village located in Markaz Rif Dimashq, Rif Dimashq to the east of the Al-Nashabiyah nahiyah ('subdistrict'). According to the Syria Central Bureau of Statistics (CBS), Al-Jarba had a population of 2,172 in the 2004 census.
