= Deir Salman =

Deir Salman دير سلمان
- Village
- Location in Syria
- Coordinates: 33°28′55″N 36°30′4″E
- Country: Syria
- Governorate: Rif Dimashq
- District: Markaz Rif Dimashq
- Subdistrict: Al-Nashabiyah

Population (2004)
  - Total: 6,227
- Time zone: UTC+2 (EET)
  - Summer (DST): UTC+3 (EEST)
- City Qrya Pcode: C2359

Deir Salman (Arabic: دير سلمان) is a Syrian village located in Markaz Rif Dimashq, Rif Dimashq to the southeast of the al-Nashabiyah nahiyah ("subdistrict"). According to the Syria Central Bureau of Statistics (CBS), Deir Salman had a population of 6,227 in the 2004 census.
