= Douma District =

Douma District منطقة دوما
- District
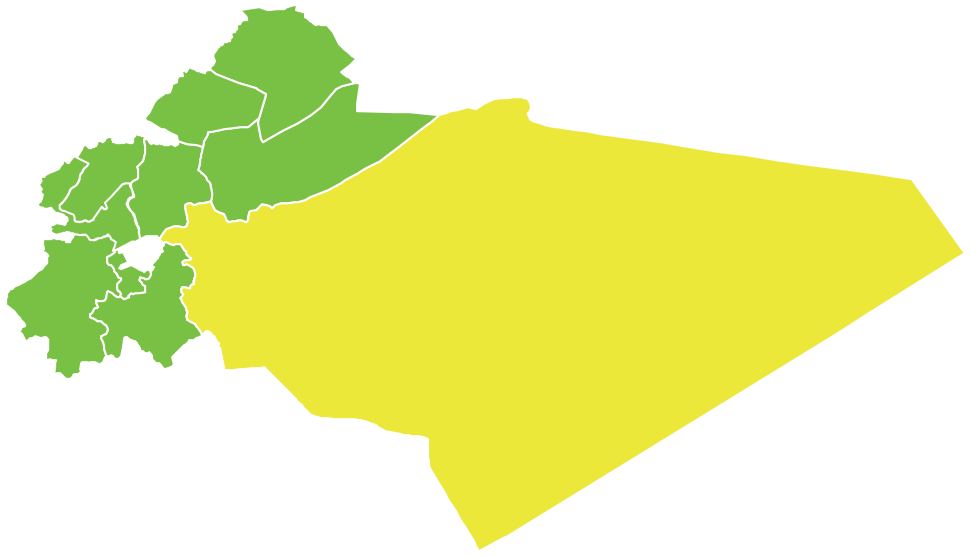
- Map of Douma District within Rif Dimashq Governorate
- Coordinates (Syria): 33.572264°N 36.401811°E
- Country: Syria
- Governorate: Rif Dimashq
- Seat: Douma
- Subdistricts: 7 nawāḥī

Area
  - Total: 19,875.92 km^{2} (7,674.14 sq mi)

Population (2004)
  - Total: 433,719
  - Density: 21.8213/km^{2} (56.5170/sq mi)
- Geocode: SY0302

Douma District (Arabic: منطقة دوما, romanized: manṭiqat Dūmā) is a district of the Rif Dimashq Governorate in southern Syria.

The second largest district of Syria following Tadmur, it stretches from the northeastern outskirts of Metropolitan Damascus to the Jordanian border, covering large swaths of the sparsely inhabited Syrian Desert. The administrative centre is the city of Douma, located just some 10 km (6 mi) to the northeast of Damascus.

At the 2004 census, the district had a population of 433,719.

== Subdistricts ==
The district of Douma is divided into seven sub-districts or nawāḥī (population as of 2004):

Subdistricts of Douma District
Code	Name	Area	Population
SY030200	Douma Subdistrict	208.73 km²	181,934
SY030201	Harasta Subdistrict	25.64 km²	88,816
SY030202	Al-Sabe' Biyar Subdistrict	12,919.39 km²	395
SY030203	Al-Dumayr Subdistrict	5,929.58 km²	26,192
SY030204	Al-Nashabiyah Subdistrict	277.76 km²	76,814
SY030205	Al-Ghizlaniyah Subdistrict	388.02 km²	36,715
SY030206	Harran al-Awamid Subdistrict	126.80 km²	22,853
