= Babbila Subdistrict =

Subdistrict in Rif Dimashq, Syria

Coordinates: 33°26′N 36°20′E

Babbila Subdistrict ناحية ببيلا
- Subdistrict
- Location of Babbila Subdistrict within Rif Dimashq Governorate
- Country: Syria
- Governorate: Rif Dimashq Governorate
- District: Markaz Rif Dimashq District

Area
  - Total: 75.77 km^{2} (29.25 sq mi)

Population (2004)
  - Total: 341,625
  - Density: 4,509/km^{2} (11,680/sq mi)

Babbila Subdistrict (Arabic: ناحية ببيلا) is a subdistrict (nāḥiya) of Markaz Rif Dimashq District in Rif Dimashq Governorate, Syria. The administrative center is the town of Babbila. According to the 2004 census, the subdistrict had a population of 341,625.

== Towns and villages ==
The subdistrict includes the following towns and villages:

- Aqraba
- Babbila
- Al-Bahdaliyah
- Beit Sahem
- Al-Buwaydah
- Hujayrah
- Hawsh Sahiya
- Khirbet al-Ward
- Najha
- Sayyidah Zaynab
- Al-Sabinah
- Yalda
