= Southern Damascus offensive (January–February 2018) =

- Part of the Syrian Civil War and the inter-rebel conflict during the Syrian Civil War
- Map of the battle
Date	5 January – 20 February 2018 (1 month, 2 weeks and 1 day)
Location	Yalda, Hajjar al-Aswad, Yarmouk Camp and Tadamon, Syria
Status	ISIL victory: ISIL captures 90% of Yarmouk

Belligerents
Tahrir al-Sham; Jaysh al-Islam; Ajnad al-Sham Islamic Union; Free Syrian Army	Islamic State of Iraq and the Levant

Units involved
Jaysh al-Islam: 17th Brigade	Dimashq Wilayah

Casualties and losses
100 killed	100 killed

The Southern Damascus offensive (January–February 2018) began on 5 January 2018 as Jaysh al-Islam fighters attempted to infiltrate ISIL positions within the orchards situated in-between Yalda and Hajjar As-Aswad to the immediate south of Damascus city. This resulted in numerous casualties and as such, a week later, on 12 January ISIL shock troops launched a counter-assault on Yalda's Zein neighborhood, triggering heavy clashes, resulting in the eventual capture of several buildings in the area. On 22 January, ISIL made further progress in Taqdam Neighborhood of Hajjar al-Aswad, to this date ISIL ended up controlling 3/4 of Yarmouk Camp, majority of Hajjar al-Aswad, Qadam, Tadamon and large part of Yalda's eastern axis. Fighting continued with ISIL forces continuing their advance against other militant groups later into January, with majority of a street between Yalda and Babbila as well as some gains within the district of Tadamon. By 27 January, ISIL controlled almost the entirety of Hajjar al-Aswad after breaking through the last lines of defense and were on the verge of entering the town of Yalda, during the same time, further areas were also captured in the Yarmouk district.

ISIL fighters managed to make a breakthrough, with the capture of the Halfa neighborhood located in the Yarmouk Camp district, during a short skirmish with Tahrir al-Sham (HTS) militants on 13 February. By 16 February, each side had inflicted around 100 casualties on each other. Haifa street and the Al-Malyoun and Al-Mashrou neighborhoods of Yarmouk were also captured by ISIL, while Tahrir al-Sham fighters fell back to their final defensible positions at Ar-Rija Square, which came under attack by ISIL on 17 February. Urban clashes continued on 20 February between ISIL and HTS units west of Yarmouk with ISIL shock troops having seized control of the Al-Wasim mosque block. On the same day, Al-Masdar News reported that HTS had brokered an agreement with the Syrian government to secure the transportation of 160 civilians from the besieged towns of al-Fu'ah and Kafriya within the Idlib Governorate in exchange for safe passage of HTS fighters and their family members from Yarmouk Camp to Idlib.

== Aftermath ==
On 10 March, ISIL threatened to kill any rebels that evacuate from the area after the Syrian Government gave rebel groups 48 hours of amnesty to leave behind all heavy equipment and either go to the Idlib Governorate or settle their issues with the Syrian Government.

On 13 March ISIL began attacking Syrian Military positions west of the Yarmouk Camp while the rebels in al-Qadam were evacuating. During clashes between SAA and ISIL in al-Qadam opposition groups attempted to break through ISIL lines however failed to do so.

== See also ==
- Battle of Yarmouk Camp (2015)
- List of wars and battles involving ISIL
