= Hawsh Sahiya =

Hawsh Sahiya حوش صهيا
- Village
- Location in Syria
- Coordinates: 33°25′24″N 36°20′23″E
- Country: Syria
- Governorate: Rif Dimashq
- District: Markaz Rif Dimashq District
- Subdistrict: Babbila

Population (2004)
  - Total: 5,355
- Time zone: UTC+2 (EET)
  - Summer (DST): UTC+3 (EEST)

Hawsh Sahiya (Arabic: حوش صهيا) is a Syrian village located in Markaz Rif Dimashq District, Rif Dimashq. According to the Syria Central Bureau of Statistics (CBS), Hawsh Sahiya had a population of 5,355 in the 2004 census. To its North are Sbeineh, Al-Buwaydah, Hujayrah, and Sayyidah Zaynab.
