= Sheikh Omar Hadid Brigade =

Islamist militant group active in the Gaza Strip

- لواء الشيخ عمر حديد
- Black Standard of ISIL
- Leaders: Yunis Hunnar † (May–June 2015); Unknown leader (June 2015–2019)
- Dates active: 31 May 2015 – 2019
- Active regions: Gaza Strip; East Jerusalem
- Ideology: Salafi jihadism Pan-Islamism
- Size: ~200 (2015)
- Part of: Islamic State

The Sheikh Omar Hadid Brigade (Arabic: لواء الشيخ عمر حديد, romanized: Liwāʾ ash-Shaykh ʿUmar Ḥadīd), also known as Islamic State in Gaza, was an Islamist militant group affiliated with the Islamic State in Iraq and the Levant that was reportedly active in the Gaza Strip around 2015. Its goals have consistently matched those of the Islamic State, in that it seeks to establish the al-Sham caliphate. As such, it opposes all forms of Palestinian nationalism while also supporting the elimination of all Jews and other "infidels" from the region.

The group's leader was unknown until Hamas Police raided the home of Yunis Hunnar on June 2, 2015, who was accused of leading the recently formed group and was shot dead while resisting arrest.

The group was named after Omar Hadid, an insurgent of Iraqi origin who was a member of Al-Qaeda in Iraq.

== Political ideology ==
Unlike most other Islamist groups in the Palestinian Territories, the Sheikh Omar Hadid Brigade is one of the Gazan Salafi-jihadist groups opposed to Hamas and does not endorse Palestinian nationalism. The geopolitical ideology of the Sheikh Omar Hadid Brigade can hence be defined as Pan-Islamist. In other words, the group advocates (see the Pan-Islamism Wikipedia page for more details):

"...a form of religious nationalism [that] differentiates itself from other pan-nationalistic ideologies, for example Pan-Arabism, by excluding culture and ethnicity as primary factors towards unification..."

== Emergence ==
The Sheikh Omar Hadid Brigade first emerged from the Al-Qaeda linked (Sinai and Gaza-based) Ansar Bait al-Maqdis group, in a similar way that the Islamic State of Iraq and the Levant (ISIL) emerged from Al-Qaeda in Iraq. On November 10, 2014, numerous members of Ansar Bait al-Maqdis pledged allegiance to ISIL leader Abu Bakr al-Baghdadi, culminating in the eventual creation of the Sheikh Omar Hadid Brigade on May 31, 2015. In early 2015, Hamas launched a crackdown against ISIL affiliates operating in the Gaza Strip, arresting dozens of individuals. This may have provided an incentive for ex-Ansar Bait al-Maqdis ISIL-affiliated militants to organise themselves, sparking the creation of the brigade in late May of that year.

Other reasons for the group's eventual formation include Hamas' humiliating defeat to ISIL in April 2015 during the Battle of Yarmouk Camp in Syria, where various Hamas-linked factions controlling the Yarmouk Refugee Camp were easily overrun by ISIL. During the offensive, a senior Hamas official, Sheikh Abu Salah Taha, was beheaded by the ISIL militants. This event may have had an influence on Islamists in the Palestinian Territories, who no longer saw Hamas as an entity worthy or their support and saw more of a future for ISIL. ISIL affiliates in the Palestinian Territories may have used this event to their advantage, recruiting sufficient numbers of Islamists to form a viable organisation.

== Organization and activity ==
The group is deemed to be an indirect offshoot of Ansar Bait al-Maqdis, absorbing most of its former Gaza-based members among other Islamists, some originating from the Army of Islam group and others defecting from Hamas.

Following the disbanding of Ansar Bait al-Maqdis in November 2014, another ISIL-affiliated offshoot group was indirectly formed in Egypt, known as Sinai Province or Wilayat Sinai, a Sinai-based group. Wilayat Sinai is a known ally of the Sheikh Omar Hadid Brigade, and both groups are known to have smuggled supplies to each other across the Egypt–Gaza border. This trading relationship was severely impeded during the summer of 2015, when the Egyptian Army dug a deep trench along the border.

== Designation as a terrorist organization ==
Since the group is a known affiliate of ISIL, all international terrorist designations given to ISIL also apply to the Sheikh Omar Hadid Brigade, these having been given by; the United Nations, the European Union, the United Kingdom, the United States of America, Australia, Canada, Saudi Arabia, Indonesia, the United Arab Emirates, Malaysia, Egypt, India, Russia, Kyrgyzstan, and Syria (see the Islamic State Wikipedia page for more details).

== Operations ==
=== Involvement in Palestinian civil conflicts ===
- May 31, 2015 — The group's first official attack was carried out against a Hamas commander, in a car bombing in Gaza. The target, Saber Siam, was killed instantly.
- August 28, 2019 — Suicide bombers thought to be aligned with the Islamic State group attacked two police checkpoints in Gaza, killing three Palestinian officers.

=== Involvement in Israeli-Palestinian conflicts ===
- June 3, 2015 — Two separate rocket attacks were launched on Israel from Gaza, both of which failed. One landed in the Negev, while the other landed near Ashkelon.
- June 11, 2015 — An attempted rocket attack targeting Ashkelon was carried out from Gaza. The rocket failed to reach its target and exploded in Gaza instead.
- July 16, 2015 — A rocket attack from Gaza aimed at Ashkelon failed, with the rocket exploding over open territory in the western Negev.
- August 26, 2015 — Another similar rocket attack failed, with the rocket landing between a small Israeli community and the border security fence.
- September 18, 2015 — Two rockets were launched in an attack on southern Israeli cities. The first rocket landed in Sderot, destroying a bus and damaging a residence, though no casualties were reported. The Iron Dome system intercepted the second rocket, fired a few hours later, which was aimed at Ashkelon.
- September 29, 2015 — Two separate rocket attacks aimed at Ashdod failed. Both rockets were intercepted by the Iron Dome system.
- October 26, 2015 — A rocket attack from Gaza failed, with the rocket landing in open territory in the western Negev.

== See also ==
- Ansar Bait al-Maqdis
- Sinai Province
