= Deir al-Asafir =

Deir al-Asafir دير العصافير Dayr al-Assafir
- Village
- Location within Syria
- Coordinates: 33°27′55″N 36°25′11″E
- Country: Syria
- Governorate: Rif Dimashq Governorate
- District: Markaz Rif Dimashq
- Nahiya: Al-Malihah Subdistrict

Population (2004)
  - Total: 6,209
- Time zone: UTC+3 (EET)
  - Summer (DST): UTC+2 (EEST)

Deir al-Asafir (Arabic: دير العصافير; also spelled Dayr al-Assafir or Dair al-Asafir) is a village in southern Syria, administratively part of the Rif Dimashq Governorate, located 12 kilometers southeast of Damascus. It is situated in a heavily farmed area in the Ghouta region. Nearby localities include Babbila to the west, al-Malihah to the northwest, Zabdin to the north, Shabaa to the southwest.

According to the Syria Central Bureau of Statistics, Deir al-Asafir had a population of 6,209 in the 2004 census. Between 1,000 and 1,500 Nawar (Syrians of Turkmen or Dom origin) reside in Deir al-Asafir. They largely reside in a quarter outside the village center. Much of the remaining population are Arab farmers. Starting in the 1960s some of Deir al-Asafir's Turkmen inhabitants also entered the field of agriculture. However, the majority of Turkmen men in work laborers, produce sellers and truck drivers. The hookah bars in tourist-frequented cafes in the Ghouta region is dominated by Turkmen waiters.

== History ==
In the 16th-century, towards the end of Mamluk rule in Syria, the revenues of Deir al-Asafir were part of milk (private property previously part of a fief), a quarter of which was owned by Jan Sevar bin Abdullah, a slave girl of the Mamluk Yilbay.

The Nawar of Deir al-Asafir were headed by the al-Tahir family who served as mukhtars for the community. Between the 1930s and 1965 the mukhtar of the Nawar was Abu Jamil al-Tahir (died 1965) who was succeeded by his son Jamil al-Tahir. An agricultural cooperative specializing the breeding of dairy cattle was established in Deir al-Asafir in 1965 under the government's agrarian reforms plan. The land where the cooperative operated was expropriated from lands owned by local landlords. Jamil died in 1967 and was succeeded by his son Ali Jamil al-Tahir. When the mukhtar of Deir al-Asafir died in 1975, his office was briefly occupied by his deputy before power passed to Ali Jamil. Because he was not tied to the traditional power structure i.e. the major landlords, the ruling Ba'ath Party had backed Ali Jamil's ascension to the role of village chief from his previous role as chief of the local Nawar. The Syrian government granted Ali Jamil leadership over local security and allocated 75 rifles and other weapons to his control.

Friction between the Nawar and the farmer population of Deir al-Asafir grew following Ali Jamil's ascent to power. According to Ali Jamil, "In the old days the farmers beat us, now we beat them." In 1982 he was replaced as mukhtar by a farmer, Abu Sliman, who was still mukhtar in 2004. Ali Jamil later served a three-year jail sentence for the illegal registration of Lebanese Turkmen refugees from the Lebanese Civil War as Syrian citizens. The Nawar of Deir al-Asafir are allegedly banned from traveling outside of Syria, particularly to the Arab world, because of Ali Jamil's actions. He is still generally viewed by the Nawar of Deir al-Asafir as their mukhtar.

Deir al-Asafir has seen violence during the ongoing Syrian Civil War between the Syrian government and opposition forces which began in 2011. The village was reportedly under rebel control. Heavy clashes between rebels and security forces in Deir al-Asafir were reported by opposition activists on 11 August 2012. On 8 September 2012 the state-run Syrian Arab News Agency reported that the Syrian Army killed a large number of opposition rebels during an operation in Deir al-Asafir. On 26 November 2012 activists reported that 10 children, all below the age of 15, were killed in a playground in Deir al-Asafir after a Syrian MiG fighter jet dropped cluster bombs on the area. On 19 May 2016 the Syrian Arab Army recaptured the settlement as part of a wider operation to close the smaller rebel-controlled pocket of the Eastern Ghouta.

== Bibliography ==
- Ain Shams University (1960). Ain Shams Science Bulletin. Vol. 5–6. Ain Shams University: The Faculty.
- Berland, Joseph C. (2004). Customary Strangers: New Perspectives on Peripatetic Peoples in the Middle East, Africa, and Asia. Greenwood Publishing Group. ISBN 0897897714.
- Winter, Michael; Levanoni, Amalia (2004). The Mamluks in Egyptian and Syrian Politics and Society. BRILL. ISBN 9004132864.
