= Hujayrah =

Hujayrah حجيرة
- Village
- Location in Syria
- Coordinates: 33°26′29″N 36°19′32″E
- Country: Syria
- Governorate: Rif Dimashq
- District: Markaz Rif Dimashq District
- Subdistrict: Babbila

Population (2004)
  - Total: 4,584
- Time zone: UTC+2 (EET)
  - Summer (DST): UTC+3 (EEST)

Hujayrah (Arabic: حجيرة) is a Syrian village located in Markaz Rif Dimashq District, Rif Dimashq. According to the Syria Central Bureau of Statistics (CBS), Hujayrah had a population of 4,584 in the 2004 census. It is located in the Babbila subdistrict. Its population is composed of Sunni Arabs. To its north are Hajar al-Aswad, to its east is Al-Buwaydah, to its south is Hawsh Sahiya and to its west is Sbeineh.
