= Al-Malihah Subdistrict =

al-Malihah Subdistrict ناحية المليحة
- Subdistrict
- Location of Malihah Subdistrict within Rif Dimashq Governorate
- Coordinates: 33.4846816°N 36.3741446°E
- Country: Syria
- Governorate: Rif Dimashq
- District: Markaz Rif Dimashq District
- Seat: Al-Malihah

Area
  - Total: 74.51 km^{2} (28.77 sq mi)

Population (2004)
  - Total: 56,652
  - Density: 760.3/km^{2} (1,969/sq mi)
- Demonym: Malihawi
- Geocode: SY030104

Malihah Subdistrict (Arabic: ناحية المليحة, romanized: Nāḥiyah al-Mulayḥa) is a subdistrict of Markaz Rif Dimashq District in the Rif Dimashq Governorate of Syria. The administrative centre is the town of al-Malihah. Neighbouring subdistricts are Kafr Batna to the north, Jaramana and Babbila to the west, Nashabieh and al-Ghizlaniyah to the east.

At the 2004 census, the subdistrict had a population of 56,652.

The subdistrict, much like the rest of Eastern Ghouta was under rebel control, however was retaken by government forces in 2015 after the Battle of Al-Malihah.

== Cities, towns and villages ==
Cities, towns and villages of Malihah Subdistrict
PCode	Name	Population
C2308	al-Malihah	23,034
C2305	Shabaa	13,446
C2307	Zabdin	7,003
C2309	Deir al-Asafir	6,209
C2311	Hutaytet al-Turkman	4,800
N/A	Sahba	1,111
C2306	Ahdaf	572
C2310	Hawsh al-Sultan	477
