= Beit Sahem =

Beit Sahem بيت سحم Bayt Sahm
- Village
- Location within Syria
- Coordinates: 33°28′24″N 36°20′14″E
- Country: Syria
- Governorate: Rif Dimashq
- District: Markaz Rif Dimashq
- Subdistrict: Babbila

Population (2004)
  - Total: 15,667
- Time zone: UTC+3 (EET)
  - Summer (DST): UTC+2 (EEST)

Beit Sahem (Arabic: بيت سحم, also spelled Bayt Sahm or Beit Sahm) is a village in southern Syria, administratively part of the Markaz Rif Dimashq District of the Rif Dimashq Governorate, located Damascus's southeastern outskirts. Nearby localities include Babbila to the west, Jaramana to the north, Aqraba east and Sayyidah Zaynab to the south. According to the Syria Central Bureau of Statistics (CBS), Beit Sahem had a population of 15,667 in the 2004 census.
