= Zabdin =

Zabdin زبدين Zabadayn
- Village
- Location within Syria
- Coordinates: 33°28′59″N 36°24′6″E
- Country: Syria
- Governorate: Rif Dimashq
- District: Markaz Rif Dimashq
- Subdistrict: al-Malihah Subdistrict

Population (2004)
  - Total: 7,003
- Time zone: UTC+3 (EET)
  - Summer (DST): UTC+2 (EEST)

Zabdin (Arabic: زبدين; also spelled Zabadayn) is a village in southern Syria, administratively part of the Markaz Rif Dimashq District of the Rif Dimashq Governorate, located just east of Damascus. Nearby localities include al-Malihah to the west, Shabaa to the south, Deir al-Asafir to the southeast, Harasta al-Qantarah and Marj al-Sultan to the east, Beit Nayim to the northeast and Jisrin and Saqba to the northwest. According to the Syria Central Bureau of Statistics (CBS), Zabdin had a population of 7,003 in the 2004 census.
