= Adnan Omran (officer) =

Syrian Armed Forces major general

- Born: 1956; Tartus Governorate, Syria
- Died: 23 August 2014 (aged 58) Al-Malihah, Syria
- Allegiance: Ba'athist Syria
- Branch: Syrian Armed Forces: Syrian Arab Air Force
- Rank: Major General
- Commands: Director of Air Defense Administration of Al-Malihah; Brigade 75; Brigade 13; Brigade 22; Brigade 99; 26 Air Defense Command
- Conflicts: Syrian civil war: Battle of Al-Malihah †

Adnan Omran (Arabic: عدنان عمران) was a Syrian Armed Forces major general who held the position of Director of Air Defense Administration of Al-Malihah. He was killed by a land mine during the Battle of Al-Malihah on 23 August 2014 during an inspection of military operations, making him one of the few top-ranking generals killed in the conflict. He was the successor of the major general Hussein Isaac, who was also killed in Al-Malihah that year.

== Career ==
Adnan Omran entered the military academy in 1975 and graduated three years later with the rank of Air Defense lieutenant. He held positions in Brigade 75, Brigade 13 (promoted to brigadier general), Brigade 22, Brigade 99 and after that he moved to Homs to be the commander of the 26 Air Defense Command, where he was eventually promoted to the rank of major general. His last position held was as Director of Air Defense Administration of Al-Malihah.
