= Yalda, Syria =

Yalda يلدا
- Village
- Location within Syria
- Coordinates: 33°27′46″N 36°19′18″E
- Country: Syria
- Governorate: Rif Dimashq Governorate
- District: Markaz Rif Dimashq
- Nahiyah: Babbila

Population (2004 census)
  - Total: 28,384
- Time zone: UTC+2 (EET)
  - Summer (DST): UTC+3 (EEST)

Yalda (Arabic: يلدا, romanized: Yaldā, also spelled Yelda) is a town in southern Syria, administratively part of the Rif Dimashq Governorate, located on the southern outskirts of Damascus to the west of the Yarmouk Camp. Nearby localities include al-Hajar al-Aswad, Jaramana, Sayyidah Zaynab, al-Sabinah and Babbila. According to the Syria Central Bureau of Statistics, Yalda had a population of 28,384 in the 2004 census. The town is also in the Babbila nahiyah consisting of 13 towns and villages with a combined population of 341,625. It is a predominantly Sunni Muslim, the majority of whom are Sufis.

== History ==
The town has ancient ruins including foundations of hewn stone and Corinthian columns of basalt.

Yalda was visited by Syrian geographer Yaqut al-Hamawi in the early 13th century, during Ayyubid rule. He noted that it was "a village lying some 3 miles from Damascus. The final n is sometimes left out, and the name pronounced Yalda."

== Bibliography ==
- Porter, Josias Leslie (1855). Five years in Damascus: including an account of the history, topography, and antiquities of that city : with travels and researches in Palmyra, Lebanon, and the Hauran. Vol. 2. John Murray.
- Strange, le, Guy (1890). Palestine Under the Moslems: A Description of Syria and the Holy Land from A.D. 650 to 1500. Committee of the Palestine Exploration Fund.
