= Hutaytet al-Turkman =

Hutaytet al-Turkman حتيتة التركمان
- Village
- Location in Syria
- Coordinates: 33°26′12″N 36°25′31″E
- Country: Syria
- Governorate: Rif Dimashq
- District: Markaz Rif Dimashq
- Subdistrict: Al-Malihah Subdistrict

Population (2004)
  - Total: 4,800
- Time zone: UTC+2 (EET)
  - Summer (DST): UTC+3 (EEST)
- City Qrya Pcode: C2311

Hutaytet al-Turkman (also spelled Hteitet Elturkman; Arabic: حتيتة التركمان) is a Syrian village located in Al-Malihah Subdistrict, Markaz Rif Dimashq. Hutaytet al-Turkman had a population of 4,800 in the 2004 census.
