= Al-Bahdaliyah =

Al-Bahdaliyah البحدلية
- Village
- Location in Syria
- Coordinates: 33°25′45″N 36°21′40″E
- Country: Syria
- Governorate: Rif Dimashq
- District: Markaz Rif Dimashq
- Subdistrict: Babbila

Population (2004)
  - Total: 12,330
- Time zone: UTC+2 (EET)
  - Summer (DST): UTC+3 (EEST)
- City Qrya Pcode: C2297

Al-Bahdaliyah (also spelled Bahdaliya; Arabic: البحدلية) is a Syrian village located in Markaz Rif Dimashq. Al-Bahdaliyah had a population of 12,330 in the 2004 census.
