= Khirbet al-Ward =

Khirbet al-Ward خربة الورد
- Village
- Location in Syria
- Coordinates: 33°23′54″N 36°22′10″E
- Country: Syria
- Governorate: Rif Dimashq
- District: Markaz Rif Dimashq District
- Subdistrict: Babbila

Population (2004)
  - Total: 7,293
- Time zone: UTC+2 (EET)
  - Summer (DST): UTC+3 (EEST)

Khirbet al-Ward (Arabic: خربة الورد) is a Syrian village located in Markaz Rif Dimashq District, Rif Dimashq. According to the Syria Central Bureau of Statistics (CBS), Khirbet al-Ward had a population of 7,293 in the 2004 census. To its North is Hawsh al-Sultan, and to its south is Al-Horjelah.
