= Akraba =

Akraba (variants: Aqrab, Aqraba, Agrab or Aqrabiyah) may refer to:

== Egypt ==
- Al-Aqrab Prison, a prison in Cairo, Egypt

== Iraq ==
- Tell Agrab, an ancient settlement in Iraq in Diyala Governorate

== Palestine ==
- Aqraba, Nablus, a Palestinian town in the Nablus Governorate

== Syria ==
- Aqrab, a central Syrian town in the Hama Governorate
- Aqraba, Syria, a southern Syrian town in the Daraa Governorate
- Aqraba, Rif Dimashq Governorate, a southern Syrian town in the Ghouta region of Damascus
- Aqrabiyah, a central Syrian town in the Homs Governorate near Lebanon
