= Najha =

Village in Rif Dimashq, Syria

Najha نجها
- Village
- Location within Syria
- Coordinates: 33.38392°N 36.37822°E
- Country: Syria
- Governorate: Rif Dimashq Governorate
- District: Markaz Rif Dimashq District
- Subdistrict: Babbila Subdistrict

Population (2004)
  - Total: 1,050

Najha (Arabic: نجها) is a Syrian village administratively part of the Rif Dimashq Governorate, within the Markaz Rif Dimashq District and the Babbila Subdistrict. According to the 2004 census, it had a population of 1,050.

The village is known for a memorial erected near the cemetery of the Syrian front martyrs from the October 1973 War.

== History ==
In 1838, Eli Smith noted Nejha as being populated by Sunni Muslims.
