= Sheikh Abu Salah Taha =

- الشيخ أبو صلاح طه
- Died: April 4, 2015; Yarmouk Camp, Damascus, Syria
- Cause of death: Beheading by Islamic State
- Years active: 2014-15
- Organization: Hamas in Syria
- Known for: Leading Hamas' Syrian offshoot Defending Yarmouk Camp against Islamic State militants
- Opponent: Islamic State

Sheikh Abu Salah Taha (Arabic: الشيخ ابو صلاح طه) was the former leader of Hamas' Syrian affiliate, known as Hamas in Syria. The group is chiefly based in the Yarmouk Camp, a camp designated for Palestinian refugees in south-western Syria, near Damascus.

Sheikh Abu Salah Taha was killed by militants from the Islamic State of Iraq and the Levant on April 4, 2015, during the Battle of Yarmouk Camp, along with other senior Palestinian figures in the area. A video released by ISIL emerged a couple of hours after the event, in which Sheikh was beheaded, and his head spiked on a wooden pole.
