= Al-Sabinah camp =

Palestinian refugee camp in Syria

Al-Sabinah camp is a Palestinian refugee camp located in southern Syria, specifically next to the town of Al-Sabinah in Rif Dimashq Governorate, 14 kilometers south of Damascus. It was founded in 1948 on an area of 0.03 square kilometers of land. The residents of the camp were largely Palestinian refugees who had been displaced during the 1948 Palestine war, and in addition later on by Palestinians who had moved to the Golan Heights before being displaced as a result of the Six-Day War in 1967.

Due to the military confrontations that took place in the camp in 2013, all of its 22,600 residents were displaced. Some families then left the country in search of refuge in neighboring countries. Government forces regained control of the camp in late 2013. The camp remained closed for almost four years and housing and infrastructure had been severely damaged.

In September 2017, civilians were able to return to their homes. In 2018, all UNRWA facilities were rehabilitated, including three schools, the Environmental Health Office, the Office of Social Workers, the Food Distribution Center, the Health Center and the Community Center. The agency also provided support to Palestinian refugees by transporting water and clearing rubble from main streets and corridors.

According to statistics for the academic year 2020–2021, the number of students in the camp includes more than 3,766 children at six UNRWA schools. More than 16,000 of the 22,600 people have returned to the camp as of March 2021, while another 4,000 remain in the area around the camp.

The majority of refugees previously worked in factories and industrial facilities, or as day laborers on farms owned by Syrians. Women mostly worked as domestic servants in Damascus to support family income. Such opportunities have diminished since then, during the conflict, and the unemployment rate remains very high with limited financial resources.

Like other areas in Syria, displacement, unemployment, inflation, and protection and security risks are among the main concerns shared among both Palestinian refugees and Syrians. The 10-year conflict has led to an increase in early marriages, child labour, drug abuse, violence and psychological problems. Despite financial constraints, UNRWA has strengthened its efforts to conduct preventive and awareness-raising activities and to provide psychosocial support through its schools and the Community Centre. The situation was further exacerbated by the COVID-19 pandemic.
