= Darayya District =

Darayya District منطقة داريا
- District
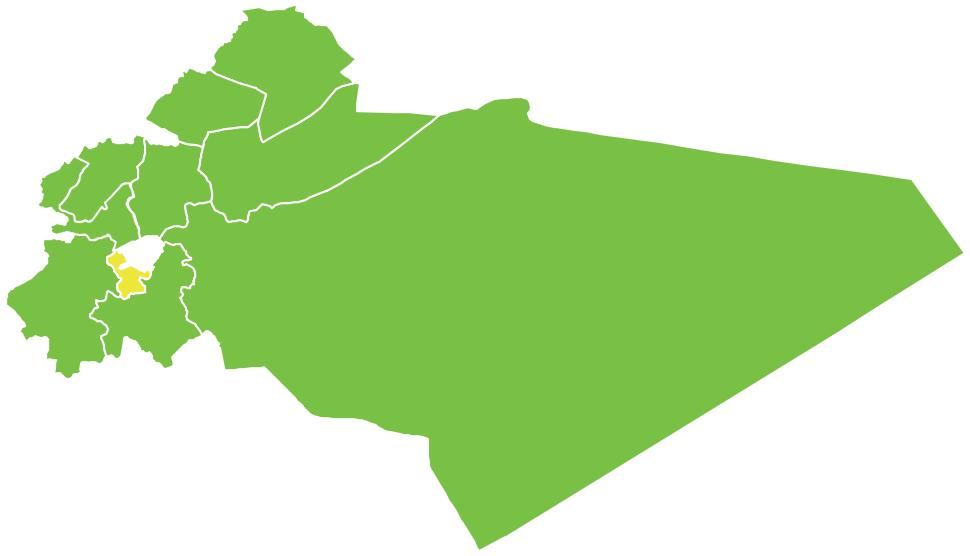
- Map of Darayya District within Rif Dimashq Governorate
- Coordinates (Qatana): 33.45°N 36.25°E
- Country: Syria
- Governorate: Rif Dimashq
- Seat: Darayya
- Subdistricts: 3 nawāḥī

Area
  - Total: 102.48 km^{2} (39.57 sq mi)

Population (2004)
  - Total: 260,961
  - Density: 2,546.5/km^{2} (6,595.3/sq mi)
- Geocode: SY0309

Darayya District (Arabic: منطقة داريا, romanized: manṭiqat Dārayyā) is a district of the Rif Dimashq Governorate in southern Syria. The administrative centre is the city of Darayya. At the 2004 census, the district had a population of 260,961.

== Sub-districts ==
The district of Darayya is divided into three sub-districts or nawāḥī (population as of 2004):

Subdistricts of Darayya District
Code	Name	Area	Population
SY030900	Darayya Subdistrict	53.60 km²	131,501
SY030901	Sahnaya Subdistrict	43.53 km²	44,512
SY030902	al-Hajar al-Aswad Subdistrict	5.36 km²	84,948

== Localities in Darayya District ==
According to the Central Bureau of Statistics (CBS), the following villages, towns and cities make up the district of Darayya:

English Name	Arabic Name	Population	Subdistrict
al-Hajar al-Aswad	الحجر الأسود	84,948	Al-Hajar al-Aswad
Darayya	داريا	78,763	Darayya
Muadamiyat al-Sham	معضمية الشام	52,738	Darayya
Ashrafiyat Sahnaya	أشرفية صحنايا	30,519	Sahnaya
Sahnaya	صحنايا	13,993	Sahnaya
