= Ashrafiyat Sahnaya =

Ashrafiyat Sahnaya أشرفية صحنايا
- Location within Syria
- Coordinates: 33.434°N 36.245°E
- Country: Syria
- Governorate: Rif Dimashq
- District: Darayya
- Subdistrict: Sahnaya

Population (2004 census)
  - Total: 30,519
- Time zone: UTC+2 (EET)
  - Summer (DST): UTC+3 (EEST)

Ashrafiyat Sahnaya (Arabic: أشرفية صحنايا, romanized: ʾAshrafīyat Ṣahnāyā, also spelled Ashrafiah Sahnaya) is a city in southern Syria, administratively part of the Rif Dimashq Governorate, located southwest of Damascus. Nearby localities include Darayya to the north, Sahnaya to the south, and al-Sabinah to the east. According to the Syria Central Bureau of Statistics, the city had a population of 30,519 in the 2004 census. Ashrafiyat Sahnaya is one of the few towns in the Ghouta with a majority Druze community, along with Jaramana, Sahnaya and Deir Ali.

== History ==
In 1838, Eli Smith noted el-Ashrafiyeh as being located in the Wady el-'Ajam, and being populated with Druze.

=== Civil war ===
On 25 August 2013, fighting occurred between Syrian Army soldiers and opposition fighters in Ashrafiyat Sahnaya. At around 18:00, the rebels started to throw objects with a catapult. Around 20:00 an object was thrown at a group of five Syrian Army soldiers. The object landed 10–15 meters from them, and released a badly smelling gas. The five soldiers were immediately taken to a field medical point where they were treated with injections, eye droplets and oxygen. They were then transported to Martyr Yusuf Al Azmah Military Hospital for emergency care, where medical personnel took blood samples of them. The blood samples tested positive for sarin. Five days after the incident, the victims were interviewed by the United Nations Mission to Investigate Alleged Uses of Chemical Weapons in the Syrian Arab Republic.

== Demographics ==
Ashrafiyat Sahnaya's residents are predominantly Druze.

== See also ==
- Druze in Syria
