= Yunis Hunnar =

Palestinian jihadist (died 2015)

- يونس هنار
- Died: June 2, 2015; Gaza City
- Cause of death: Assassination by Hamas Police
- Years active: 2015
- Organization: Sheikh Omar Hadid Brigade
- Known for: Founding the Sheikh Omar Hadid Brigade group in the Palestinian Territories; Organised assassination of high-ranking Hamas official
- Movement: Salafi jihadism
- Opponent: Hamas
- Criminal charge: Terrorism

Yunis Hunnar (Arabic: يونس هنار; died 2 June 2015) was a former leader of the Sheikh Omar Hadid Brigade, a Salafi Jihadist group based in the Gaza Strip which carries out attacks against both Hamas and Israel.

== Islamist militant activities and assassination ==
Hunnar's home in Gaza City was raided by Hamas Police on June 2, 2015, with Hamas later saying he had led the Sheikh Omar Hadid Brigade group (also known as ISIS in Gaza). Following his arrest, Yunis Hunnar was shot dead by the police forces. There have been conflicting reports on the cause and manner of his death. According to the Palestinian Centre for Human Rights:

'...[Hamas] security services in the Gaza Strip killed Yunis Sa'id al-Hunnar while attempting to arrest him from his house in Shaikh Redwan neighbourhood in Gaza City...according to the al-Hunnar's wife, "at approximately 09:00 on Tuesday, 02 June 2015, a large number of armed persons in black, some of whom were masked, raided the house and opened fire. They then kept me in a room for about an hour, during which they searched the house and seized books and papers. When I went out of the room, I was surprised to see a pool of blood by the apartment's door. I then learnt that my husband was killed and they took his body"...'

The assassination of Yunis Hunnar came as part of a crackdown launched by Hamas on Islamic State in Iraq and the Levant (ISIL) affiliates in Gaza, which started when the Mujahideen Shura Council in the Environs of Jerusalem pledged allegiance to ISIL on February 11, 2014. The crackdown intensified when the Sheikh Omar Hadid Brigade ISIL affiliate officially formed in late May 2015.
