= Aknaf Bait al-Maqdis =

Syrian Palestinian Rebel Group

- أكناف بيت المقدس
- Hamas flag, used by Aknaf Bait al-Maqdis alongside other logos
- Leaders: Abu Ahmed Mushir; Abu Hamam; Ahmad Zaghmout
- Dates active: c. 2012/13 – 2015 (main group); 2015 – present (remnant faction)
- Allegiance: Hamas (denied by Hamas)
- Headquarters: Yarmouk Camp, Damascus
- Active regions: Syria
- Ideology: Sunni Islamism
- Size: 200 (2015)
- Wars: Syrian Civil War: Daraa Governorate campaign; Quneitra Governorate clashes (2012–14); Rif Dimashq Governorate campaign; Battle of Yarmouk Camp (2015); Southern Damascus offensive (April–May 2018) (remnants); Quneitra offensive (October 2015)
- Website: aknafpal.com

Aknaf Bait al-Maqdis (Arabic: أكناف بيت المقدس, romanized: ʾAknāf Bayt al-Maqdis, lit. "Region of the Holy House") is a Palestinian Syrian rebel group active during the Syrian Civil War.

== History ==
Following the outbreak of the Syrian Civil War, several Palestinian and Syrian members of Hamas joined the rebellion against the Syrian government, and formed Aknaf Beit al-Maqdis. The group was only loosely affiliated to the Syrian opposition, however, and its true allegiance remained with Hamas. Hamas, however, officially denied any links with Aknaf Beit al-Maqdis. The group was primarily active in the Yarmouk Camp of Damascus, which it defended alongside other insurgents from government attacks from 2013. It also had branches in Quneitra and the Daraa Governorate in southern Syria. Aknaf Beit al-Maqdis' faction in Daraa took part in a rebel offensive in September 2013 which aimed at capturing the Daraa border crossing.

Aknaf Beit al-Maqdis battled the Islamic State of Iraq and the Levant, backed by al-Nusra Front, in April 2015 and lost 90% of its territory in Yarmouk Camp. As result, Aknaf Beit al-Maqdis disintegrated, as the group was officially absorbed into the Syrian government forces, while many of its members defected to the Al-Nusra Front and ISIL. In order to save the remainder of the group (by then reduced to 160 fighters), Hamas leader Khaled Mashal reportedly contacted leading members of the PFLP-GC, Hezbollah, and the Amal Movement to guarantee the safety of Aknaf Beit al-Maqdis' members. The group's Yarmouk branch consequently joined the Syrian government forces, and one of its commanders declared the entire group dissolved. Local pro-government troops continued to regard the reconciled ex-Aknaf Beit al-Maqdis fighters with suspicion. In early 2015, amidst its political disintegration, the UN secretary-general Ban Ki-moon accused the group of being implicated in rape and other forms of conflict-related sexual violence.

Despite the events of April 2015, a faction of the group remained active in Yarmouk Camp and allied with the Syrian rebels. This faction rejected offers of reconciliation by the government in January 2017, though it, along with Jaysh al-Islam and Jaysh al-Ababil, signed a ceasefire agreement with government forces in October 2017.

After most rebel factions in southern Damascus, including Aknaf Beit al-Maqdis, initially rejected offers to be transported to insurgent-held areas in northern Syria, the government launched an offensive from April 2018, aiming to retake all of southern Damascus. Amid this offensive, Aknaf Beit al-Maqdis clashed with the more numerous Palestinian pro-government militias in Yarmouk Camp. Hard-pressed and without hopes of victory, the insurgents yielded in May, and agree to surrender and be relocate to northern Syria. The pro-rebel Aknaf Beit al-Maqdis militants and their families were among the first group of surrendered insurgents to be transported to the north.

In the 2024 Syrian opposition offensives, the "general leader" of Aknaf Bait al-Maqdis and "dozens" of the group's fighters were freed from Sednaya Prison by rebels.

== See also ==
- List of armed groups in the Syrian Civil War
