= Sahnaya =

Town in southern Syria

Sahnaya صحنايا
- Town
- Location within Syria
- Coordinates: 33°25′27″N 36°13′28″E
- Country: Syria
- Governorate: Rif Dimashq
- District: Darayaa
- Subdistrict: Sahnaya

Population (2004 census)
  - Total: 13,993
- Time zone: UTC+2 (EET)
  - Summer (DST): UTC+3 (EEST)

Sahnaya (Arabic: صحنايا, also spelled Sihnaya or Sehnaya) is a town in southern Syria, administratively part of the Rif Dimashq Governorate, located southwest of Damascus in the western Ghouta. Nearby localities include Ashrafiyat Sahnaya, Darayya, Muadamiyat al-Sham, Jdeidat Artouz, Khan Danun and Al-Kiswah. According to the Syria Central Bureau of Statistics, Sahnaya had a population of 13,993 in the 2004 census. The town is also the administrative center of the Sahnaya nahiyah consisting of two towns with a combined population of 44,512. Sahnaya is one of the few towns in the Ghouta with a majority Druze community, along with Jaramana, Ashrafiyat Sahnaya and Deir Ali.

== History ==
Sahnaya's residents are predominantly Druze and Greek Orthodox. The cavern of St. Paul near the town was supposedly the hiding place of Paul the Apostle when he was pursued in Damascus.

In 1838, Eli Smith noted Sahnaya as being located in the Wady el-'Ajam, and being populated with Druze and Antiochian Greek Christians.

A former Greek Orthodox Metropolitan of Argentina, Malatios Alsweti, comes from Sahnaya. The town is also known for its old olive trees, some of which are around 500 years old.

Until the start of the Syrian Civil War in 2011, Sahnaya was home to the main campus of the Little Village private school. The school relocated to some unconnected campuses in Damascus.

== Geography ==
Sahnaya has a rural population and a hot climate. Most houses are simple; they are mostly made of cement because it is located in Damascus, one of the oldest cities in the world.

=== Climate ===
In Sahnaya, there is a local steppe climate. Rainfall is higher in winter than in summer. The Köppen-Geiger climate classification is BSk. The average annual temperature in Sahnaya is 17.0 °C (62.6 °F). About 217 mm (8.54 in) of precipitation falls annually.

Climate data for Sahnaya
Month	Jan	Feb	Mar	Apr	May	Jun	Jul	Aug	Sep	Oct	Nov	Dec	Year
Mean daily maximum °C (°F)	12.1 (53.8)	13.9 (57.0)	17.7 (63.9)	22.6 (72.7)	28.4 (83.1)	33.1 (91.6)	35.2 (95.4)	35.6 (96.1)	31.9 (89.4)	27.0 (80.6)	20.0 (68.0)	14.3 (57.7)	24.3 (75.8)
Mean daily minimum °C (°F)	2.3 (36.1)	3.0 (37.4)	5.3 (41.5)	8.4 (47.1)	12.1 (53.8)	15.4 (59.7)	16.9 (62.4)	17.2 (63.0)	14.5 (58.1)	11.5 (52.7)	7.2 (45.0)	4.1 (39.4)	9.8 (49.7)
Average precipitation mm (inches)	49 (1.9)	39 (1.5)	26 (1.0)	13 (0.5)	8 (0.3)	0 (0)	0 (0)	0 (0)	0 (0)	8 (0.3)	29 (1.1)	45 (1.8)	217 (8.5)
Source: Climate-Data.org, Climate data

== Demographics ==
Before the Syrian civil war, Sahanya was a Druzo-Christian town (nearly 55% Druze 45% Greek Orthodox Christians) Recently, however, and due to the armed conflicts in Syria, other religious groups (mainly Sunni Muslims) moved to live in Sahnaya.

The town has an old church built from stone and named after Prophet Elijah and a Druze majlis (a Druze religious council for worshiping and meeting).

== See also ==
- Druze in Syria
- Christians in Syria

== Bibliography ==
- Burckhard, J.L. (1822). Travels in Syria and the Holy Land.
- Robinson, E.; Smith, E. (1841). Biblical Researches in Palestine, Mount Sinai and Arabia Petraea: A Journal of Travels in the year 1838. Vol. 3. Boston: Crocker & Brewster.
