= Al-Sabinah =

Al-Sabinah السبينة
- Village
- Location within Syria
- Coordinates: 33°26′2″N 36°17′8″E
- Country: Syria
- Governorate: Rif Dimashq Governorate
- District: Markaz Rif Dimashq
- Nahiyah: Babbila

Population (2004 census)
  - Total: 62,509
- Time zone: UTC+2 (EET)
  - Summer (DST): UTC+3 (EEST)

Al-Sabinah (Arabic: السبينة) is a town in southern Syria, administratively part of the Rif Dimashq Governorate, located southwest of Damascus in the western Ghouta. Nearby localities include Ashrafiyat Sahnaya, Darayya, Muadamiyat al-Sham, Sayyidah Zaynab, al-Hajar al-Aswad. According to the Syria Central Bureau of Statistics, al-Sabinah had a population of 62,509 in the 2004 census.

== History ==
Al-Sabinah is first recorded as Sēbenas (Σηοβενας) in the Diocletianic boundary stones around 300 CE.

Al-Sabinah camp, a Palestinian refugee camp, was established beside the town in 1948.
