= Al-Malihah =

Town in southern Syria

al-Malihah المليحة
- Town
- Location within Syria
- Coordinates: 33.4846816°N 36.3741446°E
- Country: Syria
- Governorate: Rif Dimashq
- District: Markaz Rif Dimashq
- Subdistrict: al-Malihah Subdistrict

Population (2004 census)
  - Total: 23,034
- Time zone: UTC+2 (EET)
  - Summer (DST): UTC+3 (EEST)

Al-Malihah (Arabic: المليحة, also spelled al-Mleha or Al Mulayhah) is a town in southern Syria, administratively part of the Rif Dimashq Governorate, located on the eastern outskirts of Damascus to the west of Jaramana, in the Ghouta area. Nearby localities include 'Aqraba, Deir al-Asafir, Zabdin, Kafr Batna and Babbila. According to the Syrian Central Bureau of Statistics, al-Malihah had a population of 23,034 as of the 2004 census. The town is also the administrative centre of the al-Malihah nahiyah, which is composed of eight towns and villages having a combined population of 56,652. Malihah is considered strategic due to its proximity to the main road between Damascus and its airport.

== History ==
=== Syrian uprising ===
During the start of the Syrian Revolution in 2011, the town participated in peaceful protests against the regime. The town was taken over by the Free Syrian Army in the First Rif Dimashq Offensive in 2012. The town stayed under rebel control and was the site of repeated artillery and aerial bombardments by the government which culminated in the Battle of Al-Malihah in 2014. The city has remained under government control until the 2024 Rebel Offensives and Fall of Damascus.
