= Qabr Essit =

Qabr Es-sit قبر الست Sayyidah Zaynab Camp
- Palestinian refugee camp
- Location in Syria
- Coordinates: 33°26′28″N 36°20′11″E
- Country: Syria
- Governorate: Rif Dimashq Governorate
- Established: 1948

Area
  - Total: 0.02 km^{2} (0.0077 sq mi)

Population (Pre-war)
  - Total: 23,700 (pre-war)
- Area code: 11

Qabr Essit Camp (Arabic: مخيم قبر الست, or Sayyidah Zaynab camp, is a 0.02-square-kilometer (4.9-acre) refugee camp near the city of Sayyidah Zaynab, populated by Palestinians. It is located 14 kilometers (8.7 mi) from the center of Damascus. The pre-war population of the camp was around 23,700.

During the Syrian Civil War, up to 40% of the camps population had fled due to fighting surrounding the camp.

Although the camp was established in 1948, most of its residents came from Quneitra Governorate after 1967, when the Golan Heights were occupied by Israel.

== History ==
=== Establishment ===
Qabr Essit camp was established on an area of 0.02 square kilometres in 1948, but the majority of the residents came in 1967. The residents, who were displaced from the Golan Heights in the Quneitra Governorate during the 1967 Arab-Israeli conflict, were displaced a second time to Qabr Essit. Most had originally fled to the Golan Heights in 1948 from nearby villages in northern Palestine.

=== Operation and living ===
Displacement, unemployment, inflation, protection and security risks are big problems for the residents in the camp. Poor sanitation is also a problem in the camp, and there is a relatively high incidence of illnesses associated with poor environmental health conditions. The sewage system is outdated and needs to be upgraded in order to cope with the demands of the camps population.
