= Hussein Isaac =

- Born: 5 February 1954; Syrian Republic
- Died: 18 May 2014 (aged 60) Al-Malihah, Rif Dimashq Governorate, Syrian Arab Republic
- Allegiance: Ba'athist Syria
- Branch: Syrian Armed Forces: Syrian Arab Air Force
- Rank: Major General
- Commands: Director of Air Defense Administration of Homs (until 2013); Director of Air Defense Administration of Al-Malihah (from 2014)
- Conflicts: Syrian civil war: Battle of Al-Malihah †

Hussein Isaac (Arabic: حسين اسحق) was a Syrian Armed Forces major general who held the positions of Director of Air Defense Administration of Homs and, later until his death, in Al-Malihah. He died during the Battle of Al-Malihah of his wounds on 18 May 2014, making him one of the few top-ranking generals killed in the conflict. The Syrian Observatory for Human Rights called his death an "important psychological blow" to the Assad government.
