= Shabaa =

Shabaa شبعا
- Village
- Location in Syria
- Coordinates: 33°27′7″N 36°22′59″E
- Country: Syria
- Governorate: Rif Dimashq
- District: Markaz Rif Dimashq
- Subdistrict: al-Malihah Subdistrict

Population (2004)
  - Total: 13,446
- Time zone: UTC+2 (EET)
  - Summer (DST): UTC+3 (EEST)
- City Qrya Pcode: C2305

Shabaa (Arabic: شبعا) is a Syrian village located in Markaz Rif Dimashq, in al-Malihah Subdistrict. Shabaa had a population of 13,446 in the 2004 census.
