= Battle of Al-Malihah =

Military operation

- Part of the Syrian Civil War (Rif Dimashq Governorate campaign)
Date	3 April – 14 August 2014 (4 months, 1 week and 4 days)
Location	Damascus, Syria
Result	Syrian Army & pro-Iran militias victory
Territorial changes	Syrian Army and pro-Iran militias capture Al-Malihah

Belligerents
(Syria) Free Syrian Army; Islamic Front; Jaysh al-Islam; Al-Nusra Front	(Syria) Syrian Arab Republic: Syrian Arab Armed Forces; National Defense Force; Hezbollah; LAAG; Liwa Fatemiyoun

Commanders and leaders
(Syria) Khaled al-Haboush (Damascus Military Council commander); Zahran Alloush (Jaysh al-Islam leader)	(Syria) Maj. Gen. Hussein Isaac † (Syria) Maj. Gen. Adnan Omran †

Casualties and losses
Unknown	Unknown (50 Afghan fighters killed)

The Battle of Al-Malihah took place in the Rif Dimashq Governorate during the Syrian Civil War.

== Battle ==
On 3 April, the Syrian Arab Army launched a "large-scale military operation" in a bid to capture the rebel-held town of Al-Malihah and several surrounding towns and villages southeast of Damascus. Pro-government sources blamed the rebels for rejecting a truce offer and also for holding a local reconciliation committee captive. The Army also stepped up its operations in the Jobar neighborhood. By the next day, 26 rebels were killed by the clashes and air raids.

Between 3 April and 3 May, rebels launched several mortar shells on Damascus, killing a total of 11 people according to state media.

On 13 April, it was reported that the Army took control of areas on Al-Malihah's edges, while the town suffered heavy bombing for 10 consecutive days.

On 27 April, rebels reportedly took hold of the Missiles Battalion base and Al Jarwe intelligence building on the Damascus-Baghdad highway. Five days later, rebels also captured base 559 in the desert east of Damascus. A rebel battalion commander was killed during the takeover. At the same time, a number of rebels were killed in an ambush set up by the Army west of the al-Iskan military yard.

On 2 May, rebels in Al-Malihah launched a counter-attack and managed to capture parts of the northern edge of Jaramana district.

On 3 May, the Army advanced further into Al-Malihah and by 4 May, controlled more than half of the town, including the town hall, according to an Army official. The SOHR confirmed the Army advance, saying government troops had reached the town center, but noted that it was unclear how firmly in control the Army was. It also claimed that Hezbollah was playing the lead role in the battle. Meanwhile, three soldiers were reportedly killed by a car bomb in southwestern Damascus.

On 5 May, a large number of rebels from Douma arrived on the outskirts of Al-Malihah and reportedly engaged government forces.

On 16 July, it was reported that Al-Nusra Front detonated a suicide car bomb followed by heavy clashes in an attempt to lift the Army siege of hundreds of rebels in Al-Malihah. According to the SOHR, 10 soldiers were killed by the blast.

On 14 August, the Syrian Army and Hezbollah took full control of the town, while the military continued to pursue insurgents in the fields north of al-Malihah. 500 rebels managed to withdraw towards the center of East Ghouta, while 100–150 rebel fighters were killed in the retreat.

During the battle for Al-Malihah, opposition forces used an extensive network of tunnels under the town and the surrounding wooded areas which favoured rebel tactics. This resulted in the slow pace of the government force's advance during the four months of fighting. The tunnel network was considered to be one of the most complex networks found in the war. After the town fell, the military planned to use it as a springboard to advance into the rest of the Eastern Ghouta region.

The capture of Al-Malihah was followed by a new Army offensive later that month.
