= Darayya =

Darayya داريا
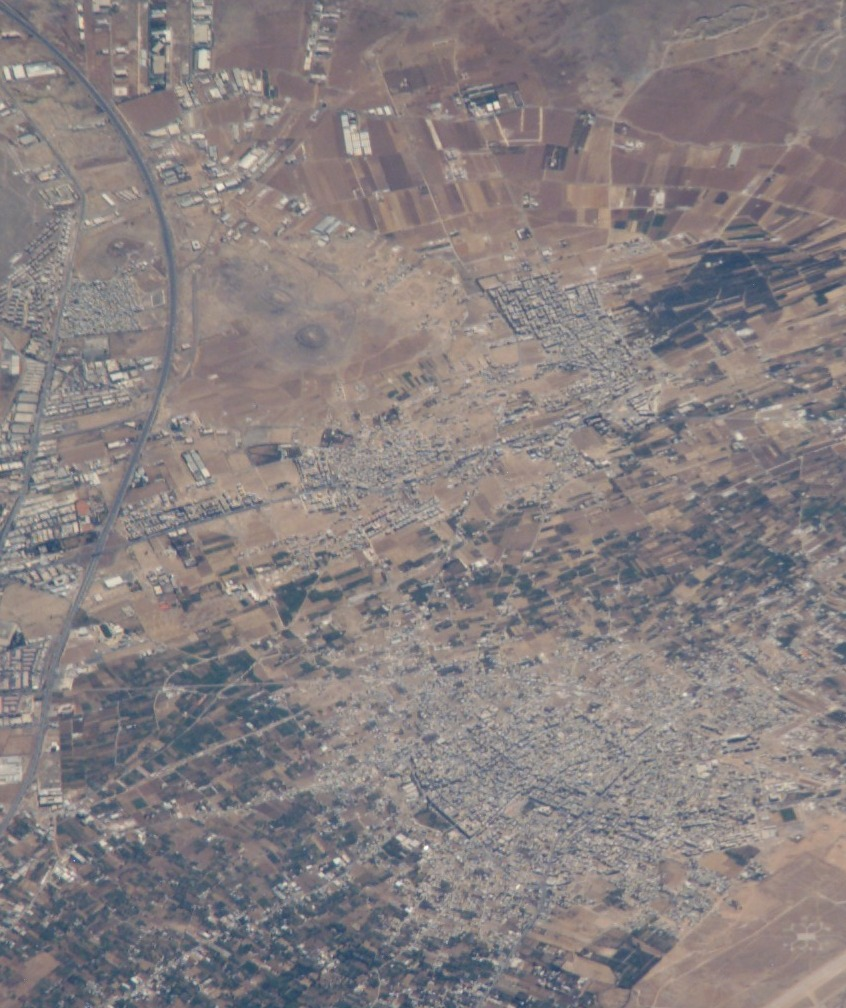
- Darayya, Ashrafiyat Sahnaya and Sahnaya

- Location in Syria
- Coordinates: 33°27′N 36°15′E
- Country: Syria
- Governorate: Rif Dimashq
- District: Darayya
- Subdistrict: Darayya

Government
  - Mayor: Mohammad Janineh
- Elevation: 689 m (2,260 ft)

Population (2004 census)
  - Total: 78,763
- Time zone: UTC+2 (EET)
  - Summer (DST): UTC+3 (EEST)
- Climate: BSk

Darayya (Arabic: دَارَيَّا, romanized: Dārayyā) is a suburb of Damascus in Syria, the centre of Darayya lying 8 km (5.0 miles) south-west of the centre of Damascus. Administratively it belongs to Rif Dimashq.

== History ==
Darayya is one of the oldest cities in Syria, reportedly the place where Paul the Apostle had his conversion (30s AD), "on Damascus road".

Darayya has been identified with Darōn (Δαρων) of Diocletianic boundary stones, erected about 300 CE.

In 1838, Eli Smith noted Daraya as being located in the Wady el-'Ajam, and being populated by Sunni Muslims and Christians.

=== Syrian civil war ===
Darayya has seen heavy fighting during the Syrian Civil War. The city was an early hotspot for anti-government protests. In August 2012, opposition groups denounced that government forces performed a mass killing that was later known as Darayya massacre, and a second time on 4 January 2013. However, as of summer 2013 fighting continued in the city with most of the municipality controlled by the armed opposition forces.

By mid-2016, the Syrian Army controlled approximately 65% of Darayya, steadily advancing and tightening the siege. In August 2016, an agreement allowed for the evacuation of rebel fighters as well as civilians. Some 700 rebels were transported to the rebel stronghold city of Idlib in the north as part of a surrender agreement.

Amid the constant bombings and conflict, a group of young people (mostly former college students) have founded an underground public library that has amassed a collection of more than 15,000 books. Most of the books were found in the rubble of ruined houses, and the librarians are documenting the name of the homeowner so that the books can be returned after the war. By 2019, 150,000 residents returned and began to rebuild and develop it, with supporting the efforts of the local council by various activities to restore the city’s commercial activity.

Coordination and partnership between the local council in the city of Darayya and the people helped speed up the city’s recovery and the return of full services including water, electricity, sewage and roads, in addition to the rehabilitation of most government and service institutions and schools, according to Council President Munther Al-Azab.

== Demographics ==
The city had a population of 78,763 as of 2004, making it the 18th largest city per geographical entity in Syria.

Darayya has an altitude of 689 metres (2,260 feet).

After 2011, the number of inhabitants decreased gradually, as a result of the conflict between the Syrian government forces and the opposition forces, to seven thousand civilians and combatants until 26 August 2016. After that and as a result of the tight siege imposed on the city, the Syrian government forced the rest of the population to accept forced displacement to the North of Syria, so the city became empty of its residents. The Syrian government allowed some families to return to their homes after obtaining the necessary security clearances.

As of 25 March 2025, at least 1,559 IDPs have returned to Darayya from various parts of Syria.

== Climate ==
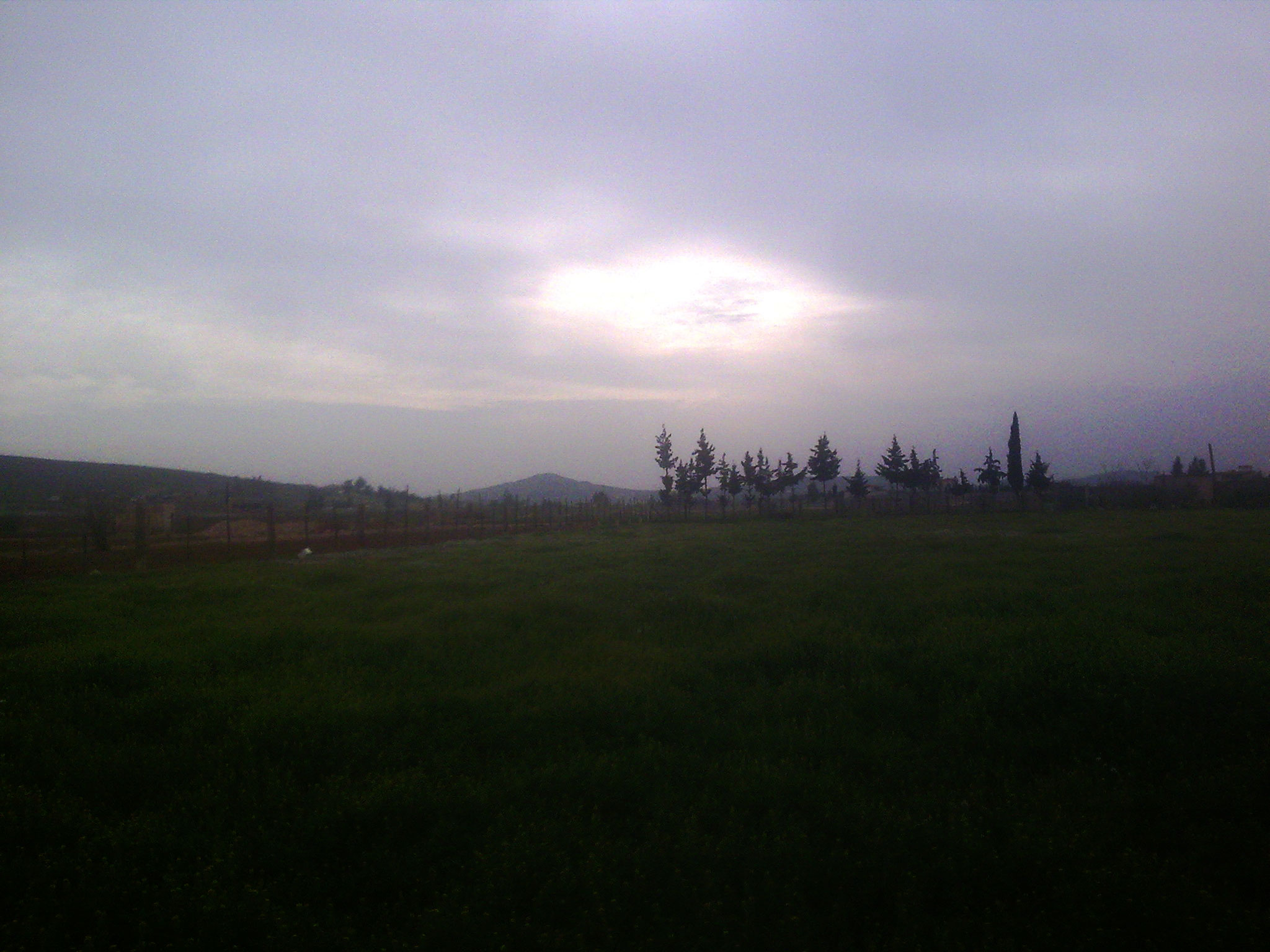
Foggy day in Darayya, 2013.

Darayya has a cold semi-arid climate (Köppen climate classification: BSk). Rainfall is higher in winter than in summer. The average annual temperature in Darraya is 17.1 °C (62.8 °F). About 211 mm (8.31 in) of precipitation falls annually.

Climate data for Darraya
Month	Jan	Feb	Mar	Apr	May	Jun	Jul	Aug	Sep	Oct	Nov	Dec	Year
Mean daily maximum °C (°F)	12.2 (54.0)	14.0 (57.2)	17.9 (64.2)	22.8 (73.0)	28.6 (83.5)	33.3 (91.9)	35.5 (95.9)	35.8 (96.4)	32.1 (89.8)	27.1 (80.8)	20.0 (68.0)	14.3 (57.7)	24.5 (76.0)
Daily mean °C (°F)	7.2 (45.0)	8.5 (47.3)	11.6 (52.9)	15.6 (60.1)	20.4 (68.7)	24.3 (75.7)	26.2 (79.2)	26.4 (79.5)	23.3 (73.9)	19.2 (66.6)	13.5 (56.3)	9.1 (48.4)	17.1 (62.8)
Mean daily minimum °C (°F)	2.3 (36.1)	3.0 (37.4)	5.3 (41.5)	8.4 (47.1)	12.2 (54.0)	15.4 (59.7)	16.9 (62.4)	17.1 (62.8)	14.5 (58.1)	11.4 (52.5)	7.1 (44.8)	4.0 (39.2)	9.8 (49.6)
Average precipitation mm (inches)	47 (1.9)	38 (1.5)	26 (1.0)	13 (0.5)	7 (0.3)	0 (0)	0 (0)	0 (0)	0 (0)	8 (0.3)	28 (1.1)	44 (1.7)	211 (8.3)
Source: Climate-Data.org

== Notable residents ==
- Patriarch Gregory III Laham, the former leader of the Melkite Greek Catholic Church was born here on 15 December 1933 as Lutfy Laham.
- Yusra Mardini, Olympic swimmer, and her sister, activist Sarah Mardini, grew up in Darayya.

== See also ==
- Darayya massacre
- Christians in Syria

== Bibliography ==
- Robinson, E.; Smith, E. (1841). Biblical Researches in Palestine, Mount Sinai and Arabia Petraea: A Journal of Travels in the year 1838. Vol. 3. Boston: Crocker & Brewster.
