= Battle of Yarmouk Camp (2015) =

Battle of the Syrian Civil War

Coordinates: 33°28′27″N 36°18′11″E

- Part of the Syrian Civil War (Rif Dimashq Governorate campaign)
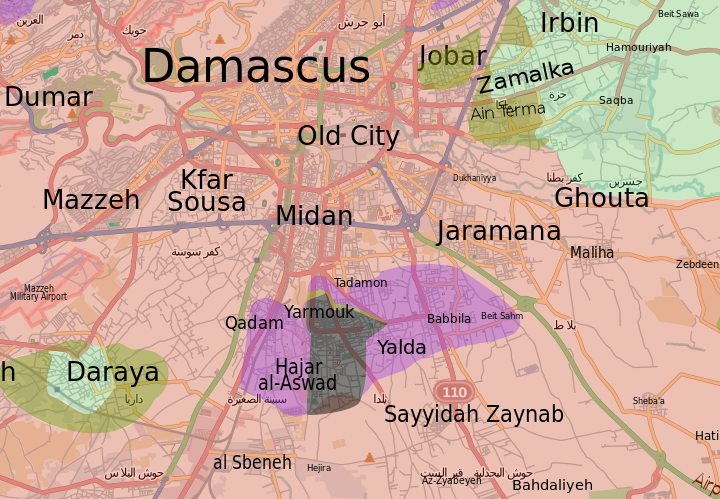
- Map of the territorial control in southern Damascus during the battle, on 4 April 2015 Controlled by the Syrian Government Controlled by the Syrian opposition Controlled by the Islamic State of Iraq and the Levant Truce/ceasefire zones
Date	1–20 April 2015 (2 weeks and 5 days)
Location	Yarmouk Camp, Southern Damascus, Syria
Result	Partial ISIL victory: 2,000 people were evacuated from the district; Rebels repel ISIL attack on the al-Qaboun and Barzah districts; Aknaf Bait al-Maqdis dissolves
Territorial changes	ISIL and al-Nusra Front initially seized 95% of the district, gains later reduced to 40%

Belligerents
Islamic State al-Nusra Front	Free Syrian Army; Jaysh al-Islam; Aknaf Bait al-Maqdis (surrendered)	(Syria) Syrian Arab Republic: Armed Forces; Hezbollah Palestine Liberation Army; PFLP-GC; Fatah al-Intifada; PPSF

Commanders and leaders
Unknown	Zahran Alloush (Jaysh al-Islam leader); Abo Hammam (Aknaf Bait al-Maqdis leader); Ahmad Zaghmout (WIA) (Aknaf Bait al-Maqdis leader)	Ahmed Jibril (PFLP-GC leader)

Units involved
Military of ISIL: Wilayat Dimashq	Free Syrian Army; Jaysh al-Ababil; 1st Brigade; (Syria) Liwa Sham al-Rasul; Liwa al-Asifa	Jihad Jibril Brigades; Popular Committee-Yarmouk Refugee Camp

Casualties and losses
80 killed (Jaysh al-Islam claim); 36 killed (PFLP-GC claim)	9–15 killed, 10 captured	5 killed
- 8–13 civilians executed by ISIL; 38 killed overall (8 civilians; SOHR); 4,000 civilians displaced

The Battle of Yarmouk Camp (2015) broke out in April 2015, during the Syrian Civil War, when the Islamic State of Iraq and the Levant stormed the rebel-held Yarmouk Camp. The Yarmouk Camp is a district of Damascus that is home to the largest community of Palestinian refugees in Syria.

== Background ==
On 17 December 2012, the Free Syrian Army and anti-government Palestinians took control of the camp. After subsequent heavy fighting, the FSA and the Syrian Army agreed to leave Yarmouk as a neutral, demilitarized zone, but the camp remained besieged and sporadic clashes continued. Syrian government forces besieged Yarmouk for two years, and as a result, approximately 200 people were believed to have died of hunger in 2014.

== The battle ==
=== ISIL storms the camp ===
On 1 April, Islamic State of Iraq and the Levant militants entered the Yarmouk Refugee Camp from the Hajar Al-Aswad district, but were expelled the next day by Syrian and Palestinian rebels. However, ISIL re-entered the camp on 4 April and took control of 90% of it. Local recruits were among the ISIL forces—having joined the militants due to anger at being starved by the Syrian government and disliking some of the rebel groups that controlled Yarmouk "for playing politics with the regime rather than confronting it."

On 5 April, Jaysh al-Islam claimed that its fighters were refused access to the camp by al-Nusra Front and that al-Nusra allowed ISIL to enter the camp, which led to some defections from the first party. The al-Nusra Front responded by defending its neutral stance in the conflict and claimed to have mediated a ceasefire. It also denied rumors about the alleged defections. Meanwhile, the Army bombed the camp with 13 barrel bombs. A commander in the Aknaf Bait al-Maqdis was killed during clashes with ISIL.

On 6 April, it was reported that about 2,000 people were evacuated from the camp since ISIL's attack. The same day, pro-government Palestinian groups led by the Palestine Liberation Army, the PFLP, PFLP-GC and Fatah al-Intifada launched an assault against ISIL. They reportedly captured Morocco Street, Al-Ja'ounah Street and the Martyrs Cemetery and claimed to have killed 36 ISIL militant and controlled 40% of the Yarmouk camp.

On 7 April, the fighting had ceased, with ISIL in control of 95% of the camp.

=== Rebel counterattack ===
On 12 April, Jaysh al-Islam and allied forces launched a counterattack on the ISIL-held Hajar al-Aswad district and reportedly advanced. Jaysh al-Islam also recaptured Al-Zein street in Yarmouk Camp from ISIL, during a nighttime operation.

By 16 April, ISIL and al-Nusra were still holding 80% of the Yarmouk Camp, after clashes with Aknaf Bait al-Maqdis and other rebels. Two days later, fighting between the rebels and ISIL expanded to the neighbourhoods of al-Qaboun and Barzah. The rebels captured 9 ISIL militants and killed 12 others.

On 19 April, an activist reported that ISIL was planning to leave the camp, although they had not yet done so. He also revealed that most of the al-Nusra Front fighters in Yarmouk Camp had defected to ISIL, and that the two groups were closely collaborating in the area. By then, Aknaf Bait al-Maqdis had dissolved and joined Syrian Government forces. By 20 April, the ISIL attack on the two districts had been repelled.

== Aftermath ==
After the retreat of ISIL from the al-Qaboun and Barzah districts, the UN continued trying to bring relief aid into Yarmouk Camp. However, the camp remained sealed off, and the relief workers were only able to deliver supplies to the communities outside of Yarmouk Camp. ISIL control was eventually shrunk to 40% of the area, with another 20% being contested. Meanwhile, talks continued for making the Yarmouk Camp a neutral region, with plans for the expulsion of all gunmen from the area.

Fighting between ISIL and government forces continued in the camp into late May. On 8 June 2015, Palestinian militias in Yarmouk Camp reportedly expelled ISIL from the area of Damascus. However, three weeks later, it was revealed that Yarmouk Camp was still under siege by Syrian Army forces.

=== October 2017 ===
The Islamic State of Iraq and the Levant (ISIL) launched a big assault in the Yarmouk Camp, targeting the neighbourhoods controlled by Aknaf Beit Al-Maqdis and Jaysh Al-Islam.

According to the terrorist group's official media wing, their forces captured the Yarmouk Hospital and several buildings nearby after overtaking the Islamist fighters in the southern part of the district.

Most of the Yarmouk Camp is under the occupation of the Islamic State, which leaves the remaining civilians inside the district at the mercy of the terrorist group.

While the Syrian Red Crescent and UN have attempted to deliver humanitarian aid to the beleaguered neighbourhoods of Yarmouk, they have found themselves often blocked by the Islamic State terrorists manning checkpoints between this district and nearby Palestine Camp.

=== January 2018 ===
On 5 January 2018, Jaysh al-Islam fighters attempted to infiltrate ISIL positions within the orchards situated in-between Yalda and Hajjar As-Aswad. After weeks of sporadic clashes, ISIL managed to capture three quarters of Yarmouk Camp. By 27 January, ISIL almost entirely controlled Hajjar al-Aswad after breaking through the last lines of defense, and were on the verge of entering the town of Yalda. During the same time, further areas had also been captured in Yarmouk district.

== Foreign reactions ==
- United States – State Department Deputy Spokesperson Marie Harf condemned ISIL's attack on the Yarmouk refugees camp.
- Egypt – The Egyptian Foreign Ministry also condemned ISIL's attack and called for "an immediate end to the fighting in order to preserve the lives of civilians... and reiterates Egypt's solidarity with our Palestinian brotherly-people."
- United Nations – The UN Security Council demanded humanitarian aid access to the camp "for the protection of civilians". The UN Secretary-General has also warned of what could be a massacre of 18,000 Palestinian and Syrian civilians, including women and children.

== See also ==
- Battle of Yarmouk Camp (December 2012)
- Hama and Homs offensive (March–April 2015)
- Qalamoun offensive (May–June 2015)
- Palmyra offensive (May 2015)
- International military intervention against the Islamic State
  - American-led intervention in the Syrian civil war
- List of wars and battles involving the Islamic State
