= Aqraba, Rif Dimashq Governorate =

Aqraba عقربا
- Village
- Location in Syria
- Coordinates: 33°22′20″N 36°22′46″E
- Country: Syria
- Governorate: Rif Dimashq
- District: Markaz Rif Dimashq
- Subdistrict: Babbila

Population (2004)
  - Total: 6,799
- Time zone: UTC+2 (EET)
  - Summer (DST): UTC+3 (EEST)
- City Qrya Pcode: C2292

Aqraba (Arabic: عقربا) is a Syrian village located in the Markaz Rif Dimashq District of Rif Dimashq Governorate. Aqraba had a population of 6,799 in the 2004 census.
