= Al-Buwaydah, Rif Dimashq Governorate =

Al-Buwaydah البويضة
- Village
- Location in Syria
- Coordinates: 33°25′35″N 36°19′15″E
- Country: Syria
- Governorate: Rif Dimashq
- District: Markaz Rif Dimashq
- Subdistrict: Douma District

Population (2004)
  - Total: 8,832
- Time zone: UTC+2 (EET)
  - Summer (DST): UTC+3 (EEST)
- City Qrya Pcode: C2296

Al-Buwaydah (Arabic: البويضة) is a Syrian village located in Markaz Rif Dimashq, Douma District. Al-Buwaydah had a population of 8,832 in the 2004 census.
