= Al-Hajar al-Aswad =

Al-Hajar al-Aswad الحجر الأسود
- City
- Location in Syria
- Coordinates: 33°27′50.5″N 36°18′16″E
- Country: Syria
- Governorate: Rif Dimashq
- District: Darayya
- Subdistrict: al-Hajar al-Aswad

Population (2004 census)
  - Total: 84,948
- Time zone: UTC+2 (EET)
  - Summer (DST): UTC+3 (EEST)

Al-Hajar al-Aswad (Arabic: اَلْحَجَرُ ٱلْأَسْوَدُ, romanized: al-Ḥajaru l-Aswad, lit. 'The Black Stone') is a Syrian city just 4 km (2 mi) south of the centre of Damascus in the Darayya District of the Rif Dimashq Governorate.

According to the Syria Central Bureau of Statistics (CBS), Al-Hajar al-Aswad had a population of 84,948 in the 2004 census, making it the 13th largest city per geographical entity in Syria.

== History ==
During the Syrian Civil War, on 26 July 2012, fighting was reported in the Al-Hajar al-Aswad suburb of the capital, a place described as home to thousands of poor refugees from the Israeli-occupied Golan Heights who were at the forefront of the movement against Assad. The Free Syrian Army had withdrawn to the southern suburb of Al-Hajar al-Aswad with the suburb being shelled by Government forces and an activist in the area said that there were still ongoing clashes in the south of the city. On 27 July 2012, the army took it back. On 30 October 2012, clashes broke out in Al-Hajar Al-Aswad between rebels and the army, spreading into the adjacent Yarmuk Palestinian camp.

On 19 November, rebels seized the headquarters of an army battalion and air defense base on the edge of the suburb, making it the nearest military base to Central Damascus to fall under rebel control. In January 2014, reports indicated that opposition fighters fleeing the fallen towns are concentrated in the remaining strongholds, particularly Al-Hajar al-Aswad.

The district became a hotspot for Islamic State of Iraq and the Levant militant activity, whom controlled large areas of the district and used it for a staging ground for their assault on Yarmouk Camp in 2015.

The entire location of Al Hajar al Aswad was captured from ISIL by the Syrian Arab Army (SAA) on 16 May 2018. Yarmouk Camp still remained under ISIL control. The SAA has been attacking both locations as part of an offensive that started on 1 May 2018.

== In popular culture ==
In 2022, Al-Hajar al-Aswad served as a filming location for the Chinese action film Home Operation that dramatizes the 2015 evacuation of hundreds of Chinese citizens and other citizens from Yemen.
