= Yarmouk Camp =

Yarmouk ٱلْيَرْمُوك
- Municipality/Refugee camp
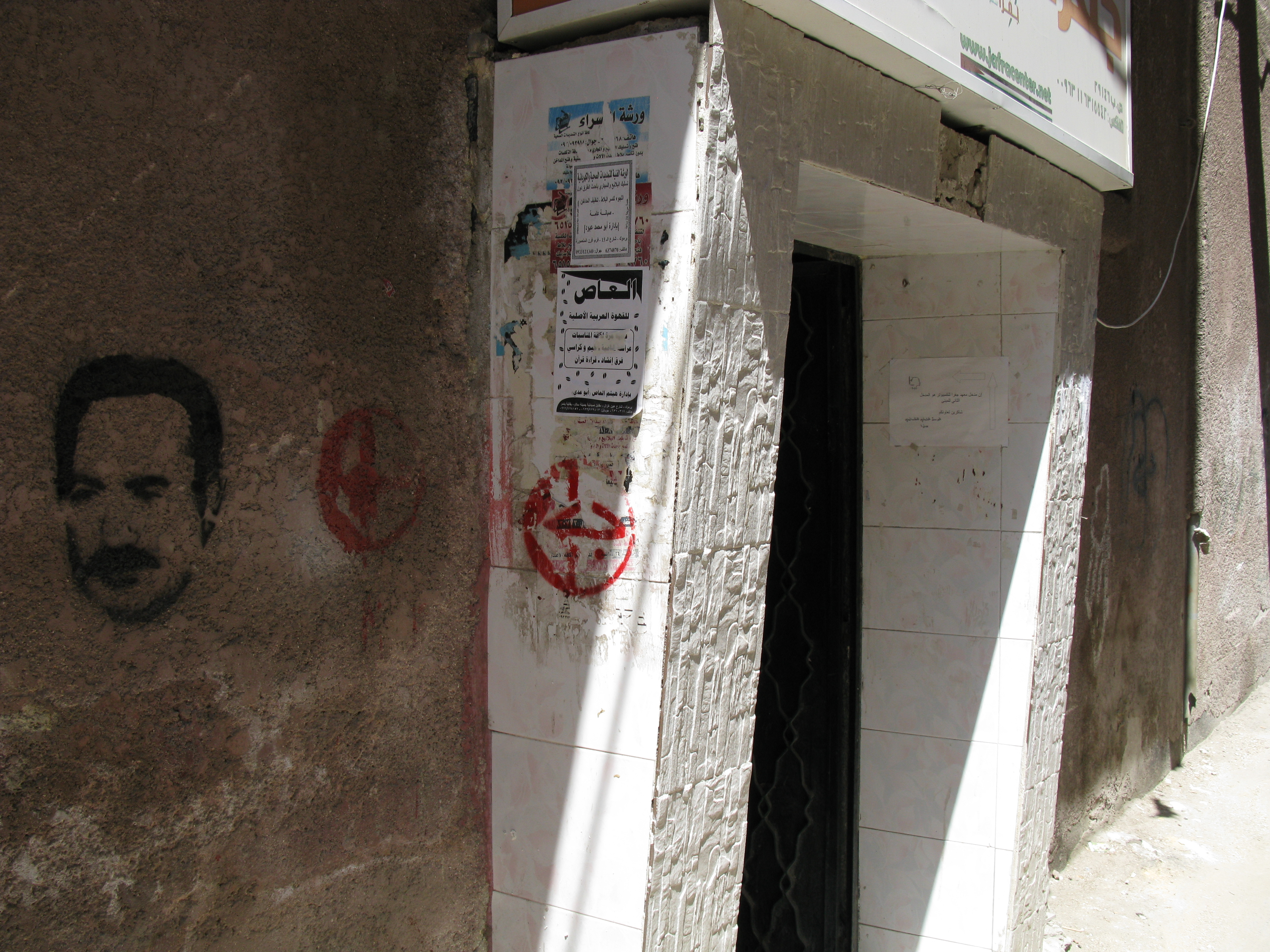
- Jafra Palestinian Youth Center in Yarmouk Camp, 2008

- Location in Syria
- Coordinates: 33°28′27″N 36°18′11″E
- Country: Syria
- Governorate: Damascus Governorate
- City: Damascus
- Established: 1957

Area
  - Total: 2.11 km^{2} (0.81 sq mi)

Population (2004)
  - Total: 137,248 (pre-war)
- Time zone: UTC+3 (EET)
  - Summer (DST): UTC+2 (EEST)
- Area code: 11
- Climate: BSk

Yarmouk (Arabic: ٱلْيَرْمُوك, ALA-LC: al-Yarmūk, IPA: [æl.jærˈmʊːk]) is a 2.11-square-kilometer (520-acre) district of the city of Damascus, populated by Palestinians. It is located 8 kilometers (5.0 mi) from the center of Damascus and within municipal boundaries; this was not the case when it was established in 1957. It contains hospitals and schools. Yarmouk is an "unofficial" refugee camp (Arabic: مُخَيَّم, ALA-LC: muḵayyam), as UNRWA rejected a Syrian government request to recognize the camp in 1960. Now depopulated, it was home to the largest Palestinian refugee community in Syria. As of June 2002, there had been 112,550 registered refugees living in Yarmouk.

During the Syrian Civil War, Yarmouk camp became the scene of intense fighting in 2012 between the Free Syrian Army and the PFLP-GC, supported by Syrian government forces. The camp was consequently taken over by various factions and deprived of supplies, resulting in hunger, disease and a high death rate, which caused many to flee.

By the end of 2014, the population had gone down to 20,000 residents. In early April 2015, most of the camp was overrun by the Islamic State of Iraq and the Levant, sparking armed clashes with Palestinian militia Aknaf Bait al-Maqdis. At this point, the population was estimated at 18,000. After intense fighting in April/May 2018, Syrian government forces took the camp, leaving only 100–200 residents. It is estimated that 160,000 Palestinians were displaced and forced to flee Yarmouk during the Syrian civil war. Many Palestinians were concerned that the Syrian regime would redevelop the area and send the former residents to remote scrubland. In 2022, Palestinians began to return, but the population remains far from its pre-war peak.

== History ==
=== Establishment ===
Yarmouk was constructed in 1957 on an area of 2.11 square kilometers (0.81 mi^{2}) to house refugees. Though it was not officially recognized as a refugee camp, road signs leading to this sector of the city read Muḵayyam al-Yarmūk, meaning "Yarmouk refugee camp". Administratively, Yarmouk is a city (madīna) in the Damascus Governorate. So, in fact, it later became another district of Damascus.

Over time, refugees living in Yarmouk improved and expanded their housing. The district became densely populated. Two main roads, named "Yarmouk Street" and "Falasteen Street", were lined with shops and filled with service taxis and microbuses that ran through the camp. The BBC wrote that, although Yarmouk "is identified as a camp, there are no tents or slums in sight. It is a residential area with beauty salons and internet cafes".

Living conditions in Yarmouk appeared to be better than in other Palestinian refugee camps in Syria, and residents of the camp numbered many professionals—doctors, engineers and civil servants, as well as many casual laborers and street vendors.

There were four hospitals and a number of government-run secondary schools. UNRWA operated 20 elementary schools and eight preparatory schools in the camp, and sponsors two women's program centers. There were three UNRWA health care centers in Yarmouk, two of which received upgrades in 1996 with contributions from the government of Canada. In 1997, six schools were upgraded with contributions from the government of the United States, and a kindergarten was built with funds from the government of Australia. In 1998, the UNRWA was also able to construct a health center funded by the government of the Netherlands. There was another Health Center whose expertise is devoted to prevention and treatment of thalassemia. The Center was built in 2009 thanks to funds provided by the Spanish Agency for International Development Cooperation (AECID).

=== During the Syrian Civil War ===
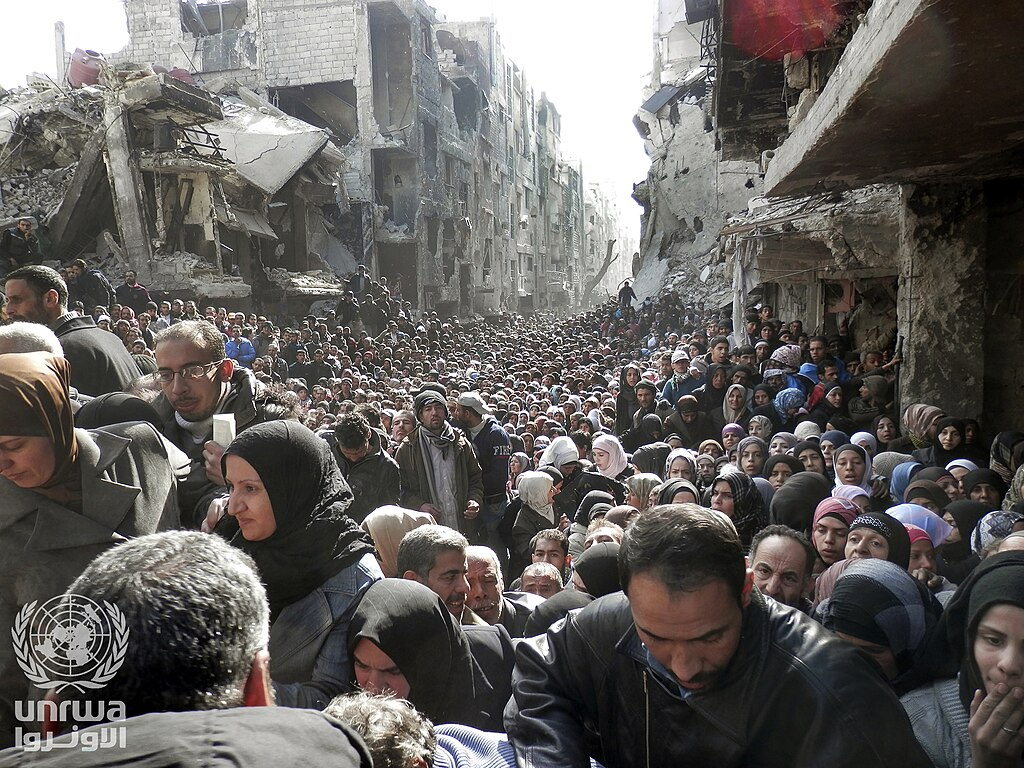
Residents of Yarmouk line up to receive aid during the Syrian civil war, January 2014

During the Syrian Civil War, Yarmouk camp became the scene of intense fighting between the Free Syrian Army and its Palestinian ally Liwa al-Asifa on the one hand, and the Popular Front for the Liberation of Palestine – General Command (PFLP-GC) supported by Syrian Army government forces on the other. Subsequently, the Syrian Army besieged the camp, leading to many leaving the area and causing a significant deterioration in conditions for the more than 18,000 Palestinian refugees and other Syrians remaining inside the camp, whom the UN described as living in "complete deprivation".

On 1 April 2015, Islamic State of Iraq and the Levant (ISIL) fighters entered the camp from the Hajar al-Aswad district, sparking clashes with Aknaf Bait al-Maqdis and the Free Syrian Army—reportedly with the collaboration of Jabhat al-Nusra fighters in the camp, with whom they were then locally allied. ISIL initially took over much of the camp, but was later pushed back from some areas, before eventually regaining control. On 2 April, it was reported that ISIL was pushed back, but they reentered on 3 April. By 4 April, the camp was reported to have been wholly taken by ISIL, and executions of residents to have begun. Palestinian sources reported about 12 camp residents killed, while the Syrian Network for Human Rights reported 13 residents executed by ISIL on 5 April; and independent sources also confirmed two fatalities from mortar fire in an adjacent Damascus area. It was reported that despite Palestinian militia resistance and parallel bombing by the Syrian Air Force, ISIL still controlled 90% of the camp by 6 April.

The situation in the camp came to the attention of the UN Security Council, leading to discussions about the situation of some 18,000 residents of the occupied camp. The UN Secretary-General warned of what could be a massacre of Palestinians in Yarmouk. It has been reported that many civilian Palestinians have been killed during the fighting.

In July 2015, the UN quietly removed Yarmouk from its list of besieged areas in Syria, despite not having been able to deliver aid there for four months, and declined to explain why it had done so. By April 2016, there remained only between 7,000 and 8,000 residents in the camp due to militant fighting, conscription by the regime, and the use of wide area effect weapons such as barrel bombs. Former residents were displaced to other areas of Syria or fled outside the country, including to Lebanon and Europe.

In early 2017, with Qatari mediation, the "Four Towns" truce was brokered between pro-government and Salafi factions, to end some of the ongoing sieges forming part of the conflict (see Siege of al-Fu'ah and Kafriya, Siege of Darayya and Muadamiyat) as well as to initiate a ceasefire in areas bordering Yarmouk. As a result of this deal, Hayat Tahrir al-Sham fighters were evacuated from Yarmouk on 7 May, and ISIL fighters were also reported to be preparing to leave.

==== War crimes ====
A report released by Amnesty International in 2014 revealed that war crimes and crimes against humanity have been carried out on Palestinian and Syrian civilians in Yarmouk. The report highlights the deaths of around 200 civilians since the siege was tightened in July 2013, and access to crucial food and medical supplies was cut off. According to their research, 128 of those who have died starved to death in the catastrophic humanitarian crisis that has emerged. Philip Luther, Director of the Middle East and North Africa Programme at Amnesty International, stated that "Civilians of Yarmouk are being treated like pawns in a deadly game in which they have no control."

According to the report, the Syrian government forces led by Bashar al-Assad have committed war crimes, including indiscriminate attacks on civilian areas such as schools, hospitals, and a mosque. The Syrian forces have also used the starvation of civilians as a weapon of war, which is another type of war crime. The electricity power supply was also cut for a year at the time of publishing the report in April 2014.

Mouaffaq Dawa, a member of the Free Palestine Movement who was infamously known as the "Butcher of Yarmouk," was sentenced to life imprisonment in Germany in February 2023. Dawa was found guilty of committing war crimes in Yarmouk Camp in 2014, which included a vengeful and indiscriminate attack on defenseless Palestinian civilians within the camp. The massacre took place on 23 March 2014 when Dawa launched an RPG—an anti-tank grenade—into a group of Palestinian civilians who were waiting to receive food. Seven individuals lost their lives, among them a young boy named Musa Nidal al-Essoud, while others sustained severe injuries.

In 2025, the German Federal Prosecutor General accused five men who had fled to Germany from Syria of committing war crimes and crimes against humanity during Syria war in Yarmouk. The prosecutor filed charges with the Koblenz Higher Regional Court. They are allegedly responsible for fatally shooting demonstrators, intimidating relatives, and torturing them with beatings and electric shocks. Furthermore, one defendant is accused of ordering the arrest and torture of several people, some of whom later died in custody.

==== End of the siege ====
On 19 April 2018, the Syrian government and its allies began a push to take Hajar al-Aswad, Tadamun and Beit Sahem, which make up the majority of Yarmouk, using surface-to-surface missiles, barrel and cluster bombs, and mortar fire in more than 580 air raids, with local activists reporting at least 15 civilians killed and more than 100 wounded. The offensive involved Aleppo-based Palestinian militia Liwa al-Quds, Russian-backed Tiger Forces, National Defense Force (Syria), a privately funded Palestinian militia, and Palestinian factions Fatah al-Intifada and the Popular Front for the Liberation of Palestine – General Command (PFLP-GC). The UNRWA reported around 5,000 Palestinians from Yarmouk were displaced to Yalda in the following six days, leaving 1,200 residents, although local sources reported 2,500 families or 3,000 people were still there. By 25 April, local sources said that at least 20 civilians had been killed. The UN described the camp as "transformed into a death camp", reporting thousands of homes and the last functioning hospital destroyed. The UK-based Action Group for Palestinians of Syria said 60% of the camp had been destroyed in the government offensive by 27 April. On 30 April, al-Nusra's remaining fighters surrendered, and were evacuated by bus to Idlib. By 5 May, the Russian Ministry of Defense announced that the Syrian army controlled two-thirds of the camp. On 16 May, a new pro-government assault on the camp with airstrikes and surface-to-surface missiles, with only a few hundred, mainly elderly, residents left inside; dozens of civilians and over 100 fighters on both sides were reported killed. On 19 May, Russian and pro-government sources reported a ceasefire between the government and ISIL, although this was denied by official government media, and busloads of ISIL fighters were reported to be evacuated by the government.

On 21 May, pro-government troops fully recaptured the camp, as ISIL fighters pulled out to deserts east of the city, thus allowing the Syrian Arab Army to control the capital after 6 years. In the month of fighting, a total of at least 21 civilians were reported killed, and 7,000 people—including 6,200 Palestinians—displaced from their homes. An UNRWA spokesman said 100 to 200 civilians were estimated to remain in Yarmouk. Sheikh Mohammed al-Omari, a cleric loyal to the government, condemned government troops and allied militias for looting homes in the captured neighborhood. According to The Economist, many Palestinians believe the government plans to redevelop Yarmouk for use by Syrians.

On 3 April 2019, Russian President Vladimir Putin announced that the Russian army, in coordination with the Syrian military, had discovered the remains of missing Israeli soldier Zechariah Baumel, along with those of 20 other people, in a cemetery in the Yarmouk Camp. Baumel had gone missing after the Battle of Sultan Yacoub during the 1982 Lebanon War and his whereabouts were unknown in the decades since. Baumel's remains were returned to Israel and buried in the Mount Herzl military cemetery in Jerusalem on 4 April.

== See also ==
- Khalil al-Wazir
- Mustafa al-Hallaj
- Battle of Yarmouk Camp (2015)
