= Babbila =

Town in southern Syria

Babbila ببيلا
- Town
- Location within Syria
- Coordinates: 33°28′22″N 36°20′4″E
- Country: Syria
- Governorate: Rif Dimashq
- District: Markaz Rif Dimashq
- Subdistrict: Babbila Subdistrict

Population (2004 census)
  - Total: 50,880
- Time zone: UTC+2 (EET)
  - Summer (DST): UTC+3 (EEST)

Babbila (Arabic: ببيلا, also spelled Bebbila) is a town in southern Syria, administratively part of the Rif Dimashq Governorate, located on the southern outskirts of Damascus to the east of the Yarmouk Camp. Nearby localities include al-Hajar al-Aswad, Jaramana, Sayyidah Zaynab, al-Sabinah and Yalda. According to the Syria Central Bureau of Statistics, Babbila had a population of 50,880 in the 2004 census. The town is also the administrative center of the Babbila nahiyah consisting of 13 towns and villages with a combined population of 341,625.
