= Sayyidah Zaynab =

Sayyidah Zaynab السيدة زينب
- Town
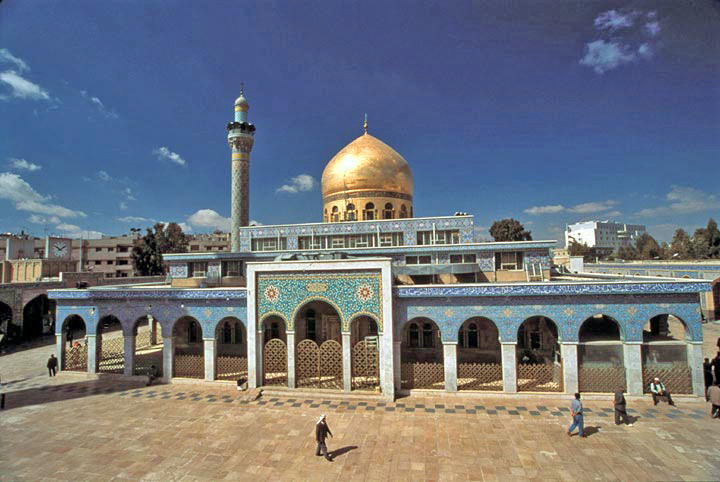
- Sayyidah Zaynab Shrine
- Nickname: Sayyida Zaynab
- Location in Syria
- Coordinates: 33°26′50″N 36°20′10″E
- Country: Syria
- Governorate: Rif Dimashq
- District: Markaz Rif Dimashq
- Subdistrict: Babbila Subdistrict

Population (2004 census)
  - Total: 136,427
- Time zone: UTC+2 (EET)
  - Summer (DST): UTC+3 (EEST)

Sayyidah Zaynab (Arabic: السيدة زينب, romanized: as-Sayyidah Zaynab; meaning "Lady Zaynab"), commonly known as Set Zaynab (Arabic: الست زينب), is a town in the Rif Dimashq Governorate of Syria, 10 km (6 mi) south of Damascus, the national capital. With a population of 136,427 (2004 census), it is the 10th most populous city in Syria and the most populous satellite city of Damascus. Administratively, the town is located in Markaz Rif Dimashq district and belongs to the nahiyah ("subdistrict") of Babbila. The municipality of Sayyidah Zaynab is still considered as a rural community by the governorate of Rif Dimashq. The city contains the Qabr Essit Palestinian refugee camp.

== Etymology ==
The name of the town is derived from the shrine that contains the grave of Zaynab, daughter of ‘Alī and Fātimah and granddaughter of Muhammad. It is believed by Twelver Shī‘a Muslims that the Sayyidah Zaynab Mosque is the authentic burial place of Lady Zaynab, whereas the Sayyidah Zainab Mosque in Cairo by the same name belongs to Zaynab bint Yahya bint Zayd bint ‘Alī Zayn al-‘Ābidīn (i.e. the great granddaughter of the Imam).

== Religious significance ==
Sayyidah Zaynab is one of the most important destinations for Shī‘a Muslim pilgrims. It has also become an important center of learning in the Shī‘i world. In the 1980s, during the Iran–Iraq War, as well as during the 1990s, the flow of visitors increased significantly because the Shī‘a shrines in Iraq were inaccessible. Until 2011, around 1 million tourists visited the town of Sayyidah Zaynab every year.

Some Shī‘a Muslim visitors come to the shrine in the town of Sayyidah Zaynab to ask for healing.

Currently, 33 public schools and a number of religious institutions are operating in the town.

== Recent history ==
On September 27, 2008, there was a car bomb attack on the intersection leading up to the mosque, killing 17 people with 17 others wounded.

On June 14, 2012, the town became the target of a suicide car bomb attack where around 14 people were heavily wounded.

Since mid summer 2012 the town has been under attack from armed militants in neighbouring Sunni towns. Many Shia and pro government families were driven out of their homes in southern Damascus and sought refuge in Sayyidah Zaynab. Constant shelling became more frequent in this predominantly Shia town, and rockets landing on random places in the town became common. In January 2013 a mortar shell landed on the Sayyidah Zaynab Shrine causing some damage to one of the minarets. Sayyidah Zaynab was reported to be a pro-government stronghold as of 7 December 2012. on 4 February 2013, it was reported that Sayyidah Zaynab was contested between rebels and hezbollah/iraqis

On January 31, 2016, at least 71 people were killed in a double bomb blast in the Koa sodhda area, near the Sayyidah Zaynab Mosque. At least 40 people were also wounded in the blasts, which were caused by car bombs. The attacks came as delegates from the Syrian government and opposition groups gathered in Geneva for provisional peace talks.

On February 21 2016, at least 134 people were killed and 180+ injured in up to four explosions including a car bomb and two suicide blasts. The Islamic State claimed responsibility.

ISIL claimed responsibility for a bomb blast in June that injured 55 people. SANA reported 12 people killed, while the SOHR said 20 died.

To maintain security, the Iranian-backed Shia militant group Hezbollah's Syrian branch guarded the site until they were withdrawn before the fall of Damascus in December 2024.

== See also ==
- Middle East
  - Holiest sites in Shia Islam
