= Markaz Rif Dimashq District =

Markaz Rif Dimashq District منطقة مركز ريف دمشق
- District
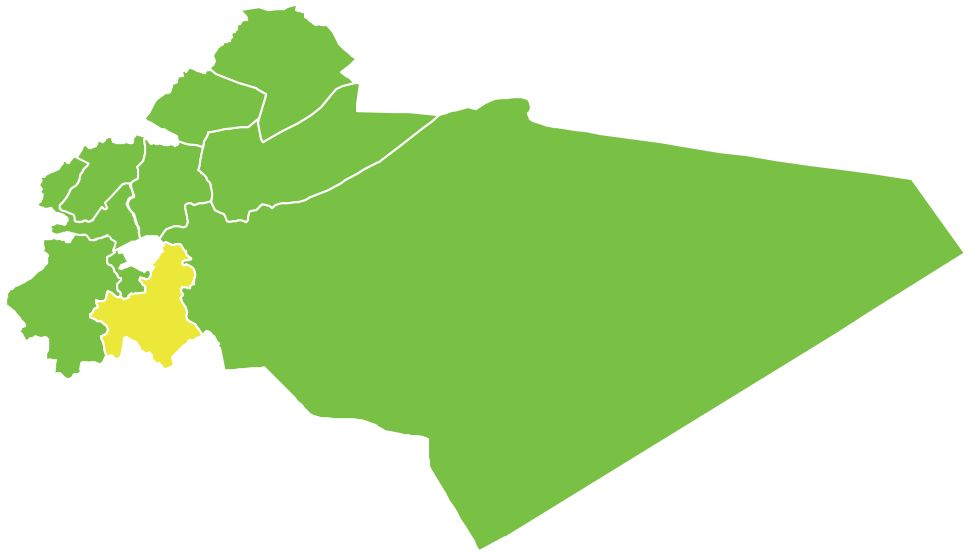
- Map of Markaz Rif Dimashq District within Rif Dimashq Governorate
- Coordinates (Damascus): 33°30′47″N 36°17′31″E
- Country: Syria
- Governorate: Rif Dimashq
- Seat: none
- Subdistricts: 6 nawāḥī

Area
  - Total: 719.71 km^{2} (277.88 sq mi)

Population (2004)
  - Total: 837,804
  - Density: 1,164.1/km^{2} (3,015.0/sq mi)
- Geocode: SY0301

Markaz Rif Dimashq District (Arabic: منطقة مركز ريف دمشق, romanized: manṭiqat Markaz Rif Dimašq) or Damascus Central Countryside District is a district of the Rif Dimashq Governorate in southern Syria.

== Geography ==
Markaz Rif Dimashq is located south of the Damascus Governorate covering the southeastern outskirts of metropolitan Damascus. With most administrative buildings being located in Damascus, the district has no official administrative centre. With a population of 136,427 inhabitants, the town of Sayyidah Zaynab however is the largest city of the district.

The district was split in 2009, when the sub-district Qudsaya, located northwest of Damascus, became a district in its own rights. At the 2004 census, the remaining subdistricts had a total population of 837,804.

== Sub-districts ==
The district of Markaz Rif Dimashq is divided into six sub-districts or nawāḥī (population as of 2004):

Subdistricts of Markaz Rif Dimashq District
Code	Name	Area	Population
SY030101	al-Kiswah Subdistrict	523.74 km²	112,095
SY030102	Babbila Subdistrict	75.77 km²	341,625
SY030103	Jaramana Subdistrict	10.42 km²	114,363
SY030104	al-Malihah Subdistrict	74.51 km²	56,652
SY030105	Kafr Batna Subdistrict	26.59 km²	123,474
SY030106	Arbin Subdistrict	8.67 km²	89,595
