= Carpentras Stele =

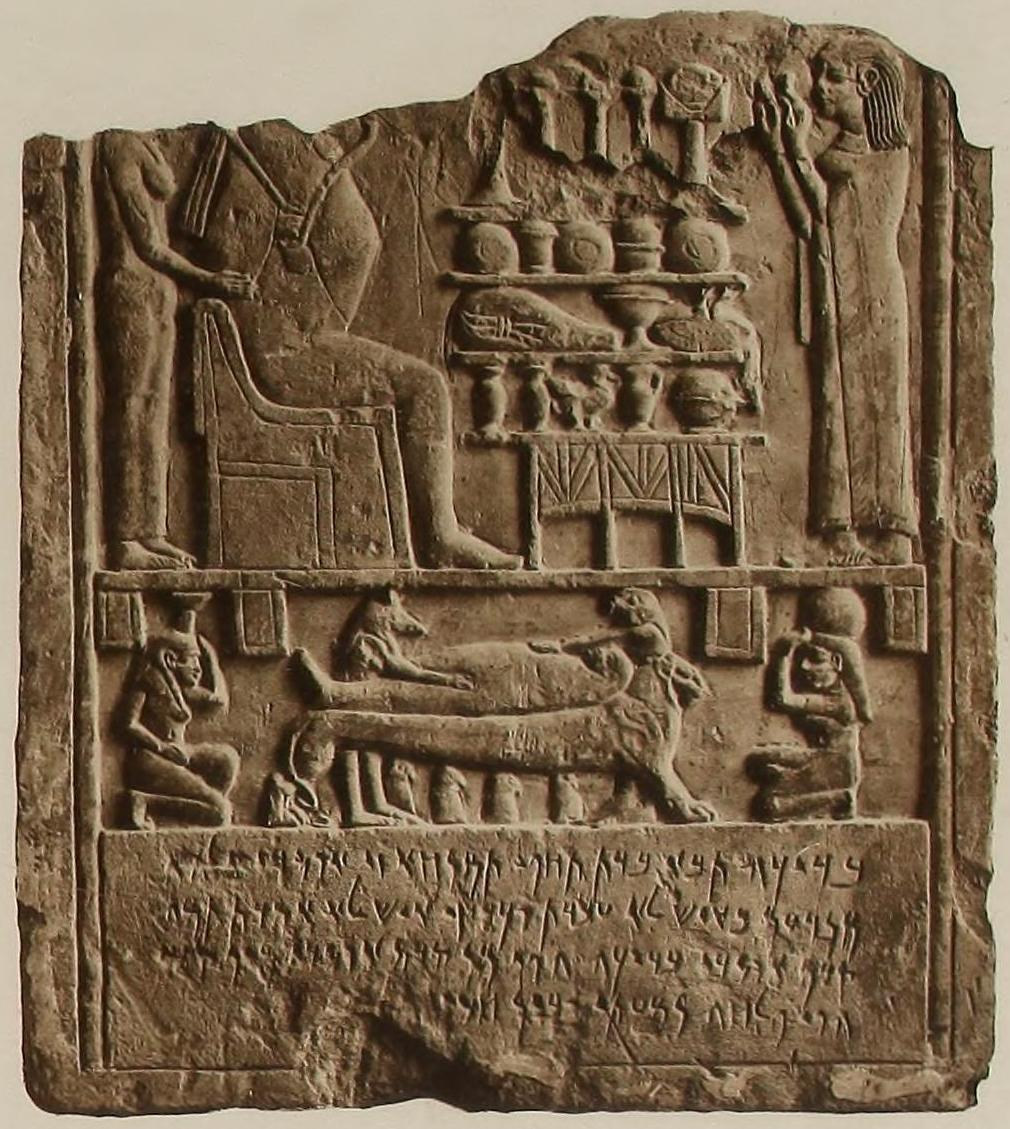
- The inscription in the Corpus Inscriptionum Semiticarum
- Material: Stone
- Writing: Aramaic
- Created: 4th century BC
- Discovered: 1704
- Present location: Bibliothèque Inguimbertine
- Identification: KAI 269; CIS II 141

The Carpentras Stele is an Egyptian stele now in Carpentras in southern France. It is the first inscription written in the Phoenician alphabet to have been published, and was identified a century later as Aramaic. It is housed in the Bibliothèque Inguimbertine, in a "dark corner" on the first floor. Older Aramaic texts have been found dating from as early as the 9th century BC, but the Carpentras Stele is the first Aramaic text to have been published in modern times. It is known as KAI 269, CIS II 141 and TAD C20.5.

It is a funerary dedication to an unknown lady called Taba; the first line of the image depicts her standing before the god of the underworld with her arms raised and the second, her lying down, dead, being prepared for burial. The textual inscription is typical of Egyptian funerary tablets in that she is described as having done nothing bad in her life, and wishes her well in the presence of Osiris. A long-running scholarly debate has focused on the language of the inscription, and whether it was written as prose or poetry.

It was the first Northwest Semitic (i.e. Canaanite or Aramaic) inscription published anywhere in modern times (the Cippi of Melqart inscriptions, reported ten years earlier in 1694, were not published in full at that time).

It was considered to be Phoenician text at the time of its discovery. Scholars later argued that the inscription was "Aramaic" or "Chaldean". Since the early 19th century the language of the inscription has been considered to be Aramaic.

It was first translated in full by Jean-Jacques Barthélemy in the 1760s, and then by Oluf Gerhard Tychsen in 1802; the two translations were subsequently compared and critiqued by Ulrich Friedrich Kopp in 1821, who was in turn quoted by Wilhelm Gesenius in his widely published Scripturae Linguaeque Phoeniciae. Kopp criticised Barthélemy and other scholars who had characterized the inscription and some coins as Phoenician, with "everything left to the Phoenicians and nothing to the Arameans, as if they could not have written at all". Kopp noted that some of the words on the stele corresponded to the Aramaic in the Book of Daniel, and in the Book of Ruth.

== Initial publication ==
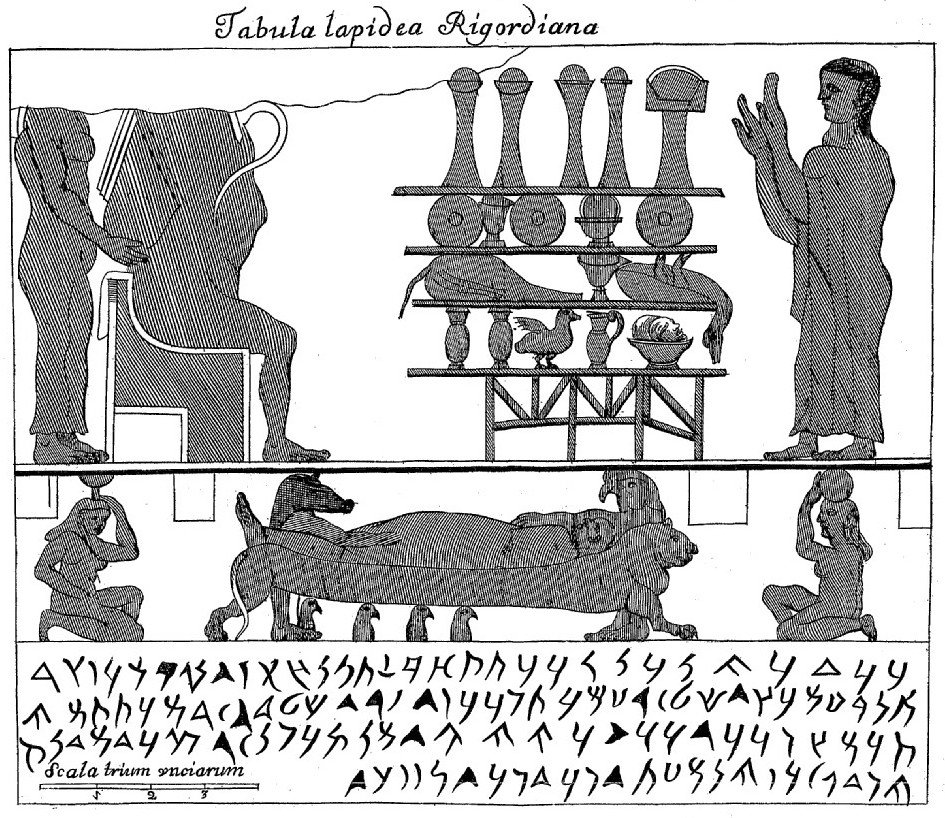
The stele as published in 1704.

The stele was first published in 1704 by Jean-Pierre Rigord in an article focused on Rigord's description of the hieratic script; the article represented the first recognition of a non-hieroglyphic Egyptian script in modern times. Rigord wrote that "I have in my Cabinet an Egyptian Monument that I have sketched here, on which there are historical figures, above a Punic inscription."

Rigord had a number of plaster casts made and distributed to others in the academic community, mostly in Southern France. The stele was subsequently reviewed by Anne Claude de Caylus, Bernard de Montfaucon and Jean-Jacques Barthélemy. Barthelemy's review ended an early dispute about the language of the inscription – a consensus formed that the inscription was Phoenician; this consensus was to last until the beginning of the 19th century.

== Poetry ==
A number of scholars have suggested that the inscription should be translated as a poem, i.e. in metric form. This was first proposed in 1868 by Joseph Derenbourg.

The inscription, in poetic form, was translated by Charles Cutler Torrey as follows:

Blessed is Taba, daughter of Tahapi, devotee of the god Osiris;
She, who to none did aught of evil, by whom no slander whatever was spoken.
Before Osiris be thou blest, before him take the gift of water;
Be thou (his) worshipper, my fair one, and among his saints be thou complete.

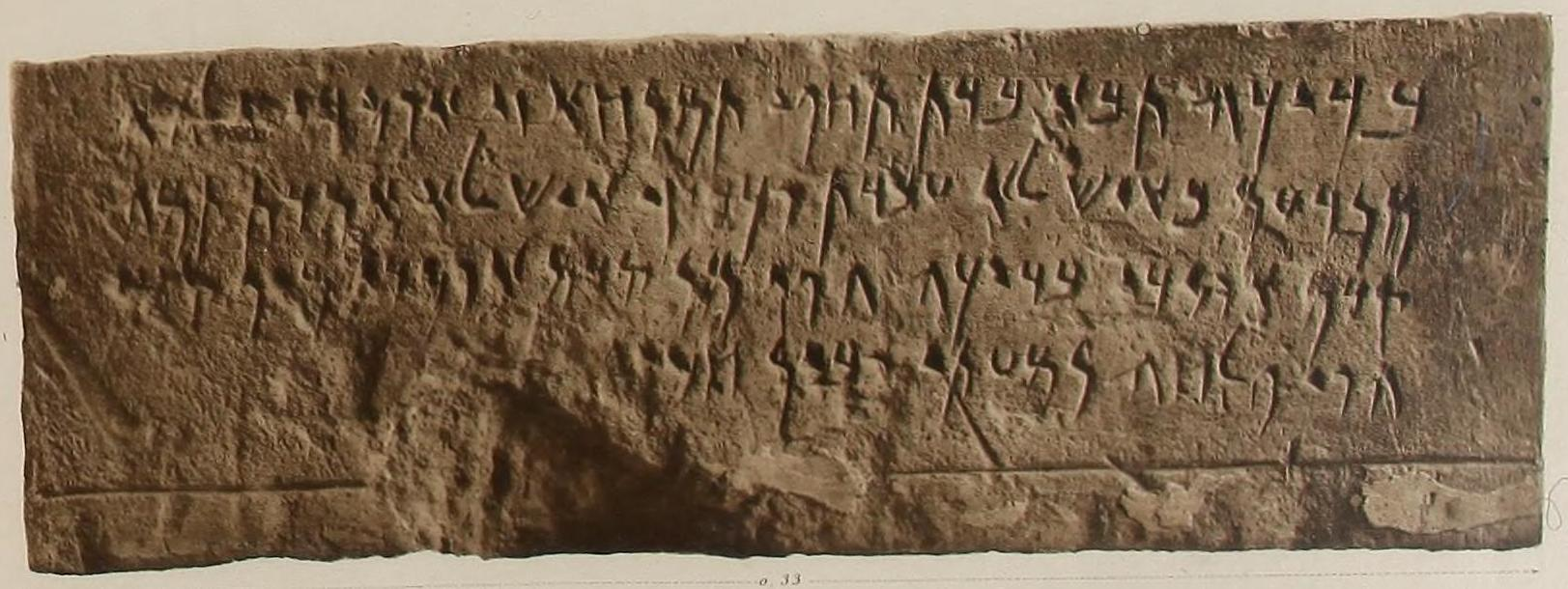
Carpentras Stela, in CIS II 141 (inscription close up)

== Images ==
In the top part of the stele, Egyptian god of the underworld Osiris sits on the throne, recognizable with his characteristic crook and flail. Behind him is a goddess dressed in a long skirt; it could be Isis or Maat. At the table a lady, perhaps the deceased, stands with her arms raised in an adoration pose. In the lower image, the deceased is shown lying on a lion-bed. The embalming god Anubis is shown, assisted by the falcon-headed Horus. The four canopic jugs with the entrails of the deceased are under the bed, with lids likely designed as heads of four sons of Horus: Imset (human head), Hapi (baboon), Duamutef (jackal), Qebehsenuef (falcon). Nephthys kneels at the feet of the dead, and Isis is shown at the head.

== Popular culture ==
The stele featured in three of the letters written by Vincent van Gogh in 1889 to his brother and sister.

== Bibliography ==
- Rigord, M., "Lettre de Monsieur Rigord Commissaire de la Marine aux journalistes de Trevoux sur une ceinture de toile trouvée en Egypte autour d'une Mumie." Mémoires pour l'histoire des Sciences et les beaux Arts, Trevoux 4 (1704): 978–1000.
- Kopp, Ulrich Friedrich (1821). "Semitische Paläographie: Aramäische ältere Schrift.". Bilder und Schriften der Vorzeit. pp. 226–244.
- Rudolf Jaggi, (2012) "Der "Stein von Carpentras", Kemet: Die Zeitschrift für Ägyptenfreunde, volume 21, issue 1, pp. 58–61
- Barthélémy (1768). "Explication d'un bas-relief égyptien, et de l'inscription phénicienne qui l'accompagne (1761)". Histoire de l'Académie royale des inscriptions et belles-lettres (in French). 32 (Académie des inscriptions et belles-lettres (France) Auteur du): 725 ff.
