= Armazi (disambiguation) =

Armazi (Georgian: არმაზი) may mean:

- Armazi, an ancient city in Georgia
- Armazi stele (disambiguation), steles found in Armazi
- Armazi, a pagan deity of ancient Georgians
- Armazi, a 9th-century church in Georgia
- Armaz(i), a male name in Georgia
