= List of Aramaic-language television channels =

This is a list of television channels in the Syriac-Aramaic language.

- Ashur TV
- Assyria TV
- Assyrian National Broadcasting (ANB)
- Ishtar TV
- KBSV
- Suboro TV
- Suroyo TV
- Suryoyo Sat
