= Armazi stele =

Armazi stele (Georgian: არმაზის სტელა) may refer to:

- Armazi stele of Vespasian (75 AD)
- Armazi stele of Serapit (150 AD)
