= Armazic language =

Extinct written Aramaic language

Armazic
- Armazian
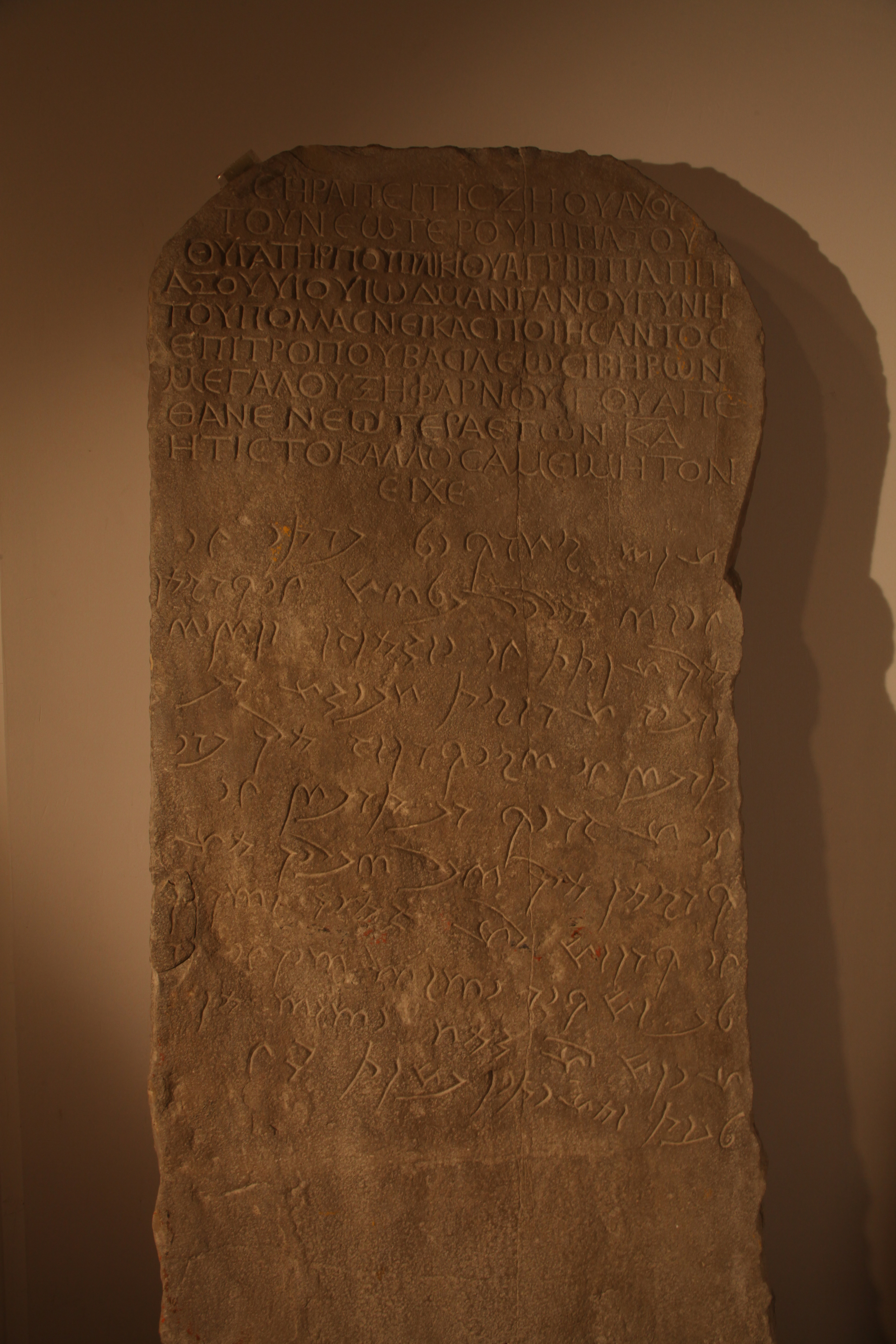
- The Stele of Serapeitis, written in both Greek and the Armazic script.
- Native to: Armenia and Georgia
- Region: South Caucasus
- Era: 1–100 AD
- Language family: Afro-Asiatic: Semitic; West Semitic; Central Semitic; Northwest Semitic; Aramoid?; Aramaic; (unclassified); Armazic
- Writing system: Aramaic

Language codes
- ISO 639-3: xrm
- Glottolog: None

Armazic (also called Armazian) is an extinct written Aramaic language used as a language of administration in the South Caucasus in the first centuries AD. Both the Armazic language and script were related to the Aramaic of northern Mesopotamia. The name "Armazic" was introduced by the Georgian scholar Giorgi Tsereteli in reference to Armazi, an ancient site near Mtskheta, Georgia, where several specimens of a local idiom of written Aramaic have been found, most famous among them the Stele of Serapeitis, bilingual in Greek. Beyond several sites in eastern Georgia, an Armazic-type inscription is also present on the temple of Garni in Armenia. The latest specimen of Armazic is an inscription of a 3rd-century plate from Bori, Georgia.
