= Stele of Serapeitis =

Funerary stele with inscriptions written in Greek and Armazic (150 AD)

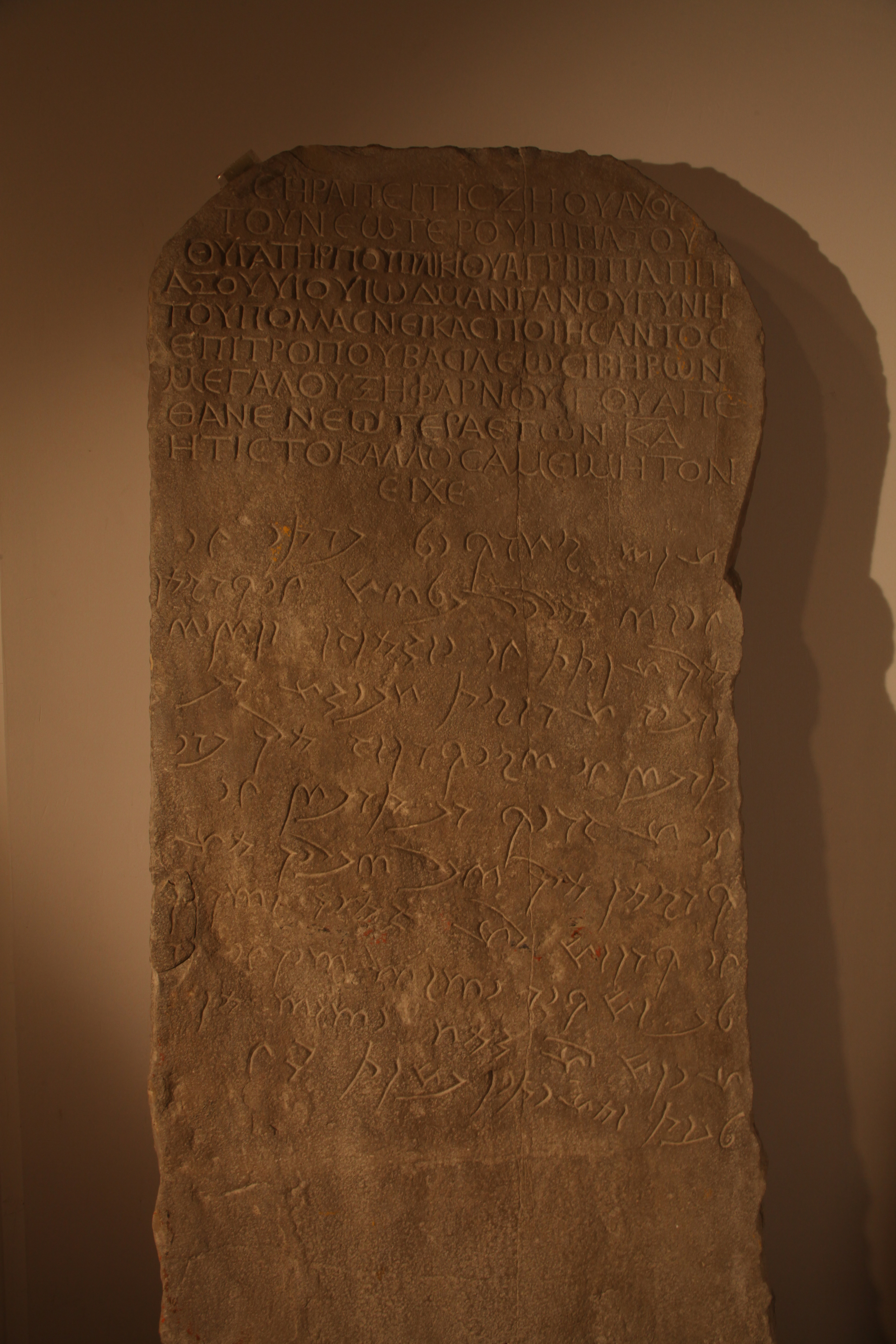
- Material: Stone
- Writing: Ancient Greek and Aramaic
- Created: 150 AD
- Discovered: 1940; Armazi
- Present location: Georgian National Museum, Rustaveli Avenue, Tbilisi, Georgia

The Stele of Serapeitis (Georgian: სერაფიტას სტელა) is a funerary stele with bilingual inscriptions written in Ancient Greek and Armazic, a local idiom of Aramaic, found in 1940, at Armazi, near Mtskheta, in the ancient capital of the Kingdom of Iberia. The stele memorialises a short-lived Georgian princess named Serapeitis. The inscriptions mention Georgian monarchs, Pharnavaz I and Pharasmanes II, and other members of aristocracy. The inscriptions are dated 150 AD. It is known as KAI 276.

== Inscriptions ==
=== Ancient Greek inscription ===
CHPAΠEITIC ZHOΥAXOΥ
TOΥ NEΩTEPOΥ ΠITIAΞOΥ
ΘΥΓATHP ΠOΥΠΛIKIOΥ AΓPIΠΠA ΠITI
AΞOΥ ΥIOΥ IΩΔMANΓANOΥ ΓΥNH
TOΥ ΠOΛΛAC NEIKAC ΠOIHCANTOC
EΠITPOΠOΥ BACIΛEΩC IBHPΩN
MEΓAΛOΥ ΞEΦAPNOΥΓOΥ AΠE
ΘANE NEΩTEPA ETΩN K—A
HTIC TO KAΛΛOC AMEIMHTON
EIXE

Serapeitis, daughter of Zeouach the Younger, pitiaxes, wife of Iodmanganos, son of Publicius Agrippa, pitiaxes, who won many battles as epitropos of the great king of the Iberians, Xepharnougos. She died, younger than twenty-one years, who had inimitable beauty.

=== Aramaic inscription ===
I am Serapit, daughter of Zewah the Younger, pitiaxes of King Pharasmanes, wife of Yodmangan the victorious and winner of many victories, master of the court of King Xepharnougos and the son of Agrippa, master of the court of King Pharasmanes, victorious over the mighty, which Pharnavaz could not accomplish. Serapit was so fine and beautiful that no one was her equal in beauty. And she died in her twenty-first year.

== Notes ==
1. In Georgian scholarly works the stele is known as Armazi bilingual (Georgian: არმაზის ბილინგვა).

== Bibliography ==
- Opper, T. (2013) Hadrian: Art, Politics and Economy, British Museum, ISBN 9780861591756
- Rapp, Stephen H. Jr (2014) The Sasanian World through Georgian Eyes: Caucasia and the Iranian Commonwealth in Late Antique Georgian Literature, Ashgate Publishing
- Metzger, B. M. (1968) ʻA Greek and Aramaic Inscription Discovered at Armazi in Georgia’ in idem, Historical and Literary Studies; Pagan, Jewish, and Greek, Leiden: Brill, p. 34-47.
- Lang, D. M. (1966) Landmarks in Georgian Literature, School of Oriental and African Studies, University of Michigan
