= Suboro TV =

Suboro TV ܦܪܣ ܚܙܘܐ ܕܣܘܒܪܐ
- Country: Lebanon, Syria
- Broadcast area: Syria; Lebanon; Worldwide (via internet)
- Headquarters: Lebanon

Programming
- Languages: Classical Syriac, Surayt, Arabic

Ownership
- Owner: Syriac Orthodox Church

History
- Launched: 25 March 2019

Links
- Website: suborotv.net

Suboro TV (Syriac: ܦܪܣ ܚܙܘܐ ܕܣܘܒܪܐ, romanized: Fros Ḥezwo d-Suboro; Arabic: سوبورو تي ڤي, romanized: Sūbawraw Tīwī) is a television channel owned and operated by the Syriac Orthodox Church. Originally conceived in 2009, the channel was officially launched in 2019 in Lebanon. Suboro TV primarily covers religious topics, as well as news from within the church itself and countries in which its adherents reside in.

== Etymology ==
The name of the channel, Suboro, is a word derived from Classical Syriac, meaning "Annunciation".

== History ==
The Syriac Orthodox Church had been hoping to begin broadcasting private Syriac-rite religious programming as early as 2009. The channel was created in response to increasing persecution and the threat of assimilation against Syriac Orthodox Christians, with the stated intent of uniting and enlightening people through its programs. Additionally, the channel was meant to serve as a purely religious channel alongside other Aramaic language programming, promoting the use of the language and awareness of culture without a specific political agenda or otherwise.

=== Launch ===
The progress of the channel was halted until the Holy Synod in 2015, and it was hoped that they would begin broadcasting by 25 March 2018, exactly the day of the Feast of the Annunciation. The channel planned to have its first stations in Lebanon and Germany, with correspondents in Syria, Iraq, Turkey, and other Syro-Orthodox communities in the West. However, the channel wouldn't officially launch until a year later in 2019, when its Lebanese headquarters were officially inaugurated. The ceremony was attended by Aram I, the Armenian Apostolic Catholicos of the Grand House of Cecilia, and Ignatius Joseph III Younan, Patriarch of the Syriac Catholic Church, as well as a media delegation from Ishtar TV. In a speech during the ceremony, the Patriarch of the Syriac Orthodox Church, Ignatius Aphrem II, proclaimed "The Voice of Antioch" had been launched for the whole world, and congratulated the team behind the channel on their successful launch.

== Activities ==
The channel sees itself as an extension to established Assyrian media channels, promoting Syriac language, heritage, and culture. The station was used during the COVID-19 lockdowns to transmit virtual streams of liturgy and fulfill religious obligations.

In November 2019, Ignatius Aphrem II participated in a gathering in New Jersey to introduce the station to audiences in the United States. In tandem with its mission, the channel took part in the "Syriac Content Creators" festival in Ankawa, hosted by the Mardutha organization in 2022. In June 2024, Ignatius Aphrem II participated in a ceremony inaugurating new studios for the channel in Aleppo, attended by archbishops of the church and the honorary president of the Middle East Council of Churches.

== Mission ==
The Syriac Orthodox Church outlined the mission of Suboro TV as follows:

- Produce and broadcast TV programs of quality and integrity that recognize and fulfill the spiritual needs of our Syriac people
- Produce religious, cultural and social programs targeting different groups within the community, such as children, youth, etc…
- Spread the gospel of our Lord Jesus Christ, faith of the Church and the teachings of the Fathers of the Syriac Orthodox Church
- Inform the rest of the world about the challenges our people are facing
- Promote multi-cultural understanding and religious dialogue
- Offer community-oriented programs that will enrich our Syriac people as well as non-Syriac viewers

== Bibliography ==
- BarAbraham, Abdulmesih (7 May 2024). "From Printed Magazines to TVs: The Evolution of Assyrian Media in European Diaspora". In Çelebi, Nurgül; Tunç, İsmet (eds.). Turabdin - Tarih Din Kültür. DTA Yayıncılık. p. 230. ISBN 9786259442570.
- Issa, Theodora (26 September 2022). "The Syrian Orthodox Church of Antioch and All the East, and COVID-19". The Ecumenical Review. 74 (3): 475–484. doi:10.1111/erev.12719 – via Wiley.

== See also ==
- Suboro
