= Ulrich Friedrich Kopp =

German legal scholar and palaeographer

Ulrich Friedrich Kopp (18 March 1762 in Kassel – 26 March 1834 in Marburg) was a German legal scholar and palaeographer.

== Life ==
Kopp came from a Hessian family of lawyers. His grandfather was the Marburg chancery director Johann Adam Kopp (1698–1748), his father the court director Carl Philipp Kopp (1728–1777). Ulrich Friedrich Kopp also studied law at the University of Marburg and then entered the Hessen-Kassel civil service, initially as an assessor with the government in Kassel. In 1788 he was appointed to the judiciary council and appointed to the senior road commission. In 1793 he was appointed Privy Councilor, in 1797 Privy Clerk and State Secretary.

Because of his poor health, Kopp tried to be released from government service in 1799. Before that he was put in charge of the court archives in 1802, and in 1803 he was appointed Privy Cabinet Councilor. In January 1804, Kopp finally left the civil service and since then has concentrated entirely on his scientific work. In the same year, the law faculty of the University of Göttingen awarded him an honorary doctorate in recognition of his services.

When Kurhessen (the former Landgraviate of Hesse-Kassel) was occupied by Napoleon Bonaparte in 1806, Kopp went into exile in Baden. He gave courses in diplomacy at the Heidelberg University, which appointed him honorary professor in 1808. At this time, Kopp was intensely interested in Roman literature and also learned Greek. The results of his studies and lectures flowed into his scientific publications.

Kopp spent the rest of his life as a private scholar in Mannheim. He died on 26 March 1834 in Marburg while visiting his friend and student Karl Friedrich Hermann.

== Career ==
Kopp's scientific interests came from diplomacy. His first book dealt with the history of the salt works in Bad Sooden-Allendorf (1788). He published a rich collection of historical legal texts from 1799 to 1801: Fragments for the explanation of German history and rights. This work is of fundamental importance because the documents published in it were later partially lost.

Kopp recognized the importance of palaeography as a basis for the historical-critical study of documents. His refined knowledge of Latin and his preoccupation with ancient legal texts enabled him to publish the first part of his Palaeographia critica in 1817. In the first volume he treated the Greek and Latin Stenography, in the second the Tironian notes. Kopp was the first to recognize the derivation of this writing from the scriptura literalis.

As a supplement to this work, he published 1819–1821 a collection of historical image and writing examples. Kopp also wrote numerous special studies on inscribed and other documents.

With the Palaegraphia critica Kopp had created a standard work. In addition to the largely positive reception of the work, there were also researchers who critically questioned his views and sometimes came to different conclusions. The meanwhile aged Kopp reacted to this criticism with a polemic that also runs through the third and fourth volumes of his Palaegraphia critica (1827).

Kopp's last major work was an annotated edition of the encyclopedia of Martianus Capella, which was completed after his death by Karl Friedrich Hermann and appeared in 1836.

== Works (selection) ==
- Beytrag zur Geschichte des Salzwerkes in den Soden bey Allendorf an der Werra. Marburg 1788
- Bruchstücke zur Erläuterung der Teutschen Geschichte und Rechte. Zwei Bände, Kassel 1799–1801
- Palaeographia critica. Vier Bände, Mannheim 1817–1829
- Bilder und Schriften der Vorzeit. Zwei Bände, Mannheim 1819–1821
- Viris doctis literarumque cultoribus. Mannheim 1823
- Bemerkungen über einige punische Steinschriften aus Karthago. Heidelberg 1824
- De varia ratione Inscriptiones Interpretandi obscuras. Frankfurt am Main 1827
- Explicatio Inscriptionis obscurae in amuleto insculptae. Heidelberg 1832
- Ueber die Aussprache des Lateinischen. Sendschreiben an sämmtliche Gymnasien. Mannheim 1834
- Martiani Minei Felicis Capellae, Afri Carthaginiensis, de nuptiis Philologiae et Mercurii et de septem artibus liberalibus libri novem. Frankfurt am Main 1836
- Theodor von Sickel (ed.): Schrifttafeln aus dem Nachlasse von U. Fr. von Kopp. Wien 1870
