= Emil Friedrich Kautzsch =

German academic (1841–1910)

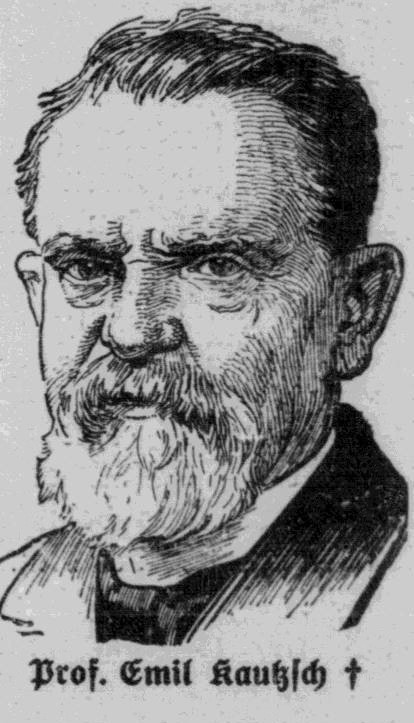
Emil Kautzsch

Emil Friedrich Kautzsch (4 September 1841 – 7 May 1910) was a German Hebrew scholar and biblical critic, born at Plauen, Saxony.

== Biography ==
He was educated at Leipzig, in whose theological faculty he was appointed privatdozent (1869) and professor (1871). Subsequently he held chairs at Basel (1872–80), where he received an honorary Swiss citizenship and made friends with Friedrich Nietzsche, after which he moved to Tübingen (1880–88) until receiving a professorship at Halle in 1888.

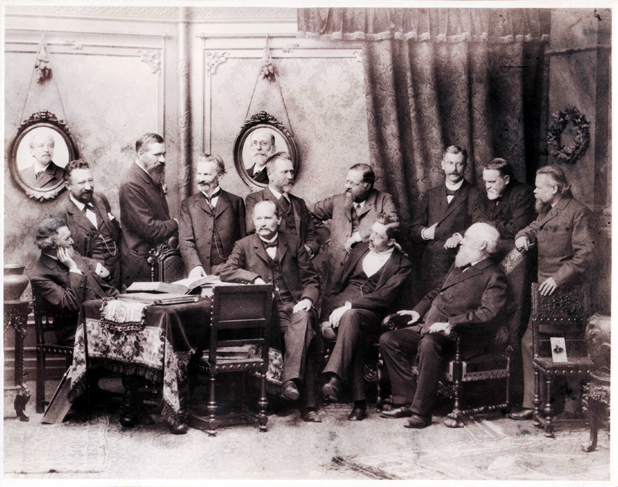
Spirituskreis (1902); standing, from left to right: Georg Wissowa, Eduard Meyer, Alois Riehl, Johannes Conrad, Carl Robert, Rudolf Stammler, Emil Kautzsch, Max Reischle; seated, from left to right: Erich Haupt, Edgar Loening, Friedrich Loofs, Wilhelm Dittenberger.

Kautzsch traveled to Ottoman Palestine in 1876, and became one of the founding members of the German Society for the Exploration of Palestine (Deutscher Palästina-Verein) the following year. He was also one of the editors of the Theologische Studien und Kritiken, beginning in 1888.

== Published works ==
Kautzsch edited the following works:

- The 8th edition of Hermann Scholz's Abriss der Hebräischen Laut- und Formenlehre, (1899).
- The 10th and 11th editions of Hagenbach's Encyklopädie und Methodologie (1880-1884).
- The 22nd through the 28th editions of Gesenius' Hebräische Grammatik, (last edition published in 1909).

In addition, Kautzsch wrote:

- De Veteris Testamenti Locis a Paulo Apostolo Allegatis, (1869).
- Die Echtheit der moabitischen Altertümer geprüft, (Strassburg, 1876).
- Kautzsch, Emil F. (1884a). Grammatik des Biblisch-Aramäischen: Mit einer Kritischen Erörterung der aramäischen Wörter im Neuen Testament. Leipzig: Vogel.
- Kautzsch, Emil F. (1884b). "The Aramaic Language". Hebraica. 1 (1–2): 98–115. doi:10.1086/368803. JSTOR 527111.
- Textbibel des Alten und Neuen Testaments, (Tübingen: J.C.B. Mohr, 1899), with Karl Weizsäcker, later Karl von Weizsäcker, grandfather of Richard von Weizsäcker. Both were honored for this work with a nobility title, which Kautzsch refused and asked for the Swiss citizenship instead.
- Apokryphen und Pseudepigraphen des Alten Testaments, (1900), with other scholars.
- Kautzsch, Emil F. (1902). Die Aramaismen im Alten Testament untersucht. Halle: Niemeyer.
- Heilige Schrift des Alten Testaments, (3rd edition, 1908–10), with other scholars.
- Biblische Theologie des Alten Testaments, (Tübingen: J.C.B. Mohr, 1911), published posthumously.
