= Rudolf Stammler =

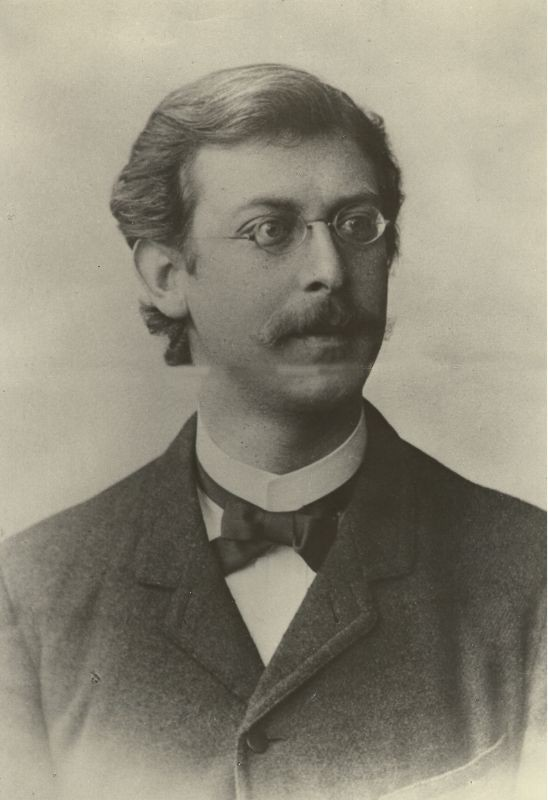
- Born: Karl Eduard Julius Theodor Rudolf Stammler; 19 February 1856; Alsfeld, Grand Duchy of Hesse
- Died: 25 April 1938 (aged 82); Wernigerode, Province of Saxony, Prussia, Germany
- Occupation: Lawyer

Karl Eduard Julius Theodor Rudolf Stammler (19 February 1856 – 25 April 1938) was an influential German philosopher of law. He distinguished a purely formal concept of law from the ideal, the realization of justice. He thought that, rather than reacting and adjusting the law to economic pressures, the law should be deliberately steered towards the current ideal.

== Life ==
Karl Eduard Julius Theodor Rudolf Stammler was born in Alsfeld, Hesse on 19 February 1856. His family on his father's side had been lawyers for three generations. He studied law at Leipzig and Giessen. His doctoral thesis won a prize, and in 1876 he gained the degree of Doctor of Law. He gained practical experience in various courts in the Land of Hesse, the last being that of Leipzig in 1880. Stammler then entered academia, and taught at the universities of Marburg (1882–82), Giessen (1884–85), Halle (1885–1916) and Berlin (1916–23). He succeeded Josef Kohler at Berlin.

In the later part of the 19th century the state was guiding Germany through rapid industrialization, which was creating new social problems. Chancellor Otto von Bismarck had obtained legislation under which the state gave a degree of unemployment insurance and old age support, but other laws also needed change. The first draft of the Bürgerliches Gesetzbuch (German Civil Code) was published in 1887, and would lead to enactment of a revised code in 1900. In 1888 Stammler gave his support to the draft code, rejecting the fatalist views of nationalists such as Otto von Gierke who thought a people's law must unfold naturally. He also opposed the view of Ferdinand Lassalle and the socialists that economic forces determine the law.

Stammler became a leading thinker in European jurisprudence, along with Gustav Radbruch (1878–1949) and Hans Kelsen (1881–1973), all of whom were greatly influenced by neo-Kantian philosophy. He claimed that law plays a central role in shaping the economy, in contrast with the Marxist view that the laws evolve naturally to support a given economic system. Rudolf Stammler died on 25 April 1938 at Wernigerode, Saxony-Anhalt, aged 82. His son, Wolfgang Stammler, broke the family's legal tradition and became a professor of German literature.

== Work ==
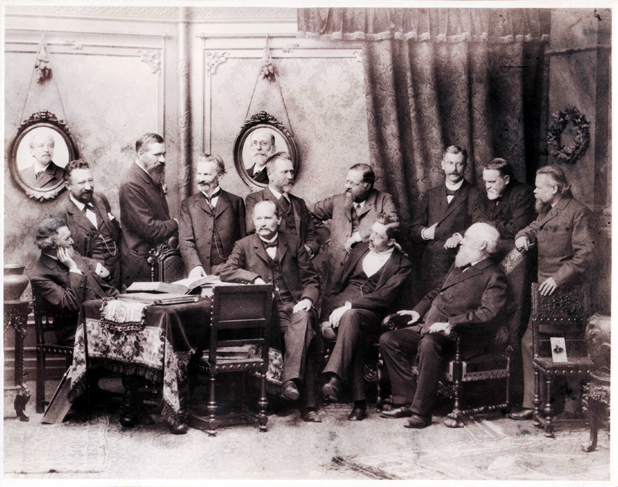
Spirituskreis 1902: Standing, left to right: Georg Wissowa, Eduard Meyer, Alois Riehl, Johannes Conrad, Carl Robert, Rudolf Stammler, Emil Kautzsch, Max Reischle. Sitting, left to right: Erich Haupt, Edgar Loening, Friedrich Loofs, Wilhelm Dittenberger

Stammler was impressed by the achievement of the great classical jurists in making the law an ars boni et aequi – a science of what is good and just. He wrote:

This, in my opinion, is the universal significance of the classical Roman jurists; this, their permanent worth. They had the courage to raise their glance from the ordinary questions of the day to the whole. And in reflecting on the narrow status of the particular case, they directed their thoughts to the guiding start of all law, namely the realization of justice in life.

Stammler and his friend Paul Natorp of the Marburg School subscribed to Immanuel Kant's concept of progress towards a moral end. Stammler borrowed from Kant's metaphysical individualism to develop his theory of metaphysical-collectivism, or social idealism. He worked towards finding a critical method, modeled on Kant's philosophical approach, for determining what constituted justice. He tried to address the question of how judges should decide cases if their decisions are to be objectively just, as opposed to formally correct. Stammler argued that a law could be considered objectively valid to the extent that it enabled the objectively harmonious purposes of freedom, unity and order.

Stammler and Natorp accepted the humanitarian and social goals of the socialists, but rejected economic determination, class struggle and metaphysical materialism. In his first major work, Wirtschaft und Recht (1896), Stammler opposed the Marxist view that law was determined by economic forces. He questioned the Marxist ideal of a society with collective ownership of the means of production that ignored the critical role of law in ensuring social justice. He granted that economic forces were powerful, but asserted that the question of justice was independent. Roscoe Pound said the revival of juristic concern with natural law dates from the publication of Wirtschaft und Recht. This book laid the foundation for all of Stammler's subsequent writings.

In Stammler's view, law should be seen as one of the regulating standards for the social economy, in which people cooperate to meet their needs through production and exchange of goods and services. It is wrong to think that law is made by arrangements to reduce economic pressure or conflicts, since law is fundamental to the existence of the economy. Stammler thought it was unrealistic to wait for law to eventually adjust itself to changes in the structure of the economy, as the Marxists would assert. The persistence of class struggle showed that the adjustments were not being made. If law were constantly being adjusted to deal with new social stresses, there would be no conflict.

Although Stammler accepted the value of historical or analytical methods in jurisprudence, he thought that they were not enough. There must be some standard or ideal against which the law can be compared to determine whether it meets its objectives. Pound credits Stammler with the concept that legal philosophy should not simply relate morals and ethics to abstract legal rules, since these might not give just results in practice. Stammler felt that the objective must be to achieve just results, defined as a social ideal. Stammler thought that this ideal depended on the level of social harmony in any place, which would change over time. Law should be adapted to conform to that ideal. Although the ideal would vary from one age to another, it remained subject to the absolute principles of respect and participation.

== Publications ==
- Rudolf Stammler (1896). Wirtschaft und Recht Nach der Materialistischen Geschichtsauffassung (Economy and Law According to the Materialist Conception of History) (in German).
- Rudolf Stammler (1902). Die Lehre von dem richtigen Rechte (The Doctrine of Proper Rights) (in German). Berlin.

- Rudolf Stammler (1925). The Theory of Justice. Translated by Isaac Husik. The Lawbook Exchange, Ltd. ISBN 978-1-58477-066-4.

- Rudolf Stammler (1911). Theorie der Rechtswissenschaft (Theory of Legal Science) (in German). Halle an der Saale.
- Rudolf Stammler (1918). Recht und Macht (Right and Power) (in German). Berlin.
- Rudolf Stammler (1925). Rechtsphilosophische Abhandlungen und Vorträge (Treatises and Lectures on Legal Philosophy) (in German). Vol. 1–2. Berlin.

== Sources ==
- Coskun, Deniz (2007-07-17). Law as Symbolic Form: Ernst Cassirer and the Anthropocentric View of Law. Springer Science & Business Media. ISBN 978-1-4020-6256-8.
- Rickford, Jonathan (2003). The European Company: Developing a Community Law of Corporations : Collected Papers from the Leiden University Unilever Programme, 2002. Intersentia nv. ISBN 978-90-5095-343-6.
- "Rudolf Stammler". Encyclopædia Britannica.
- Sabine, George H. (April 1933). "Rudolf Stammler's Critical Philosophy of Law". Cornell Law Review. 18 (3).
- Stone, Julius (1965). Human Law and Human Justice. Stanford University Press. p. 5. ISBN 978-0-8047-0215-7.
- Thornhill, Chris (2007-01-24). German Political Philosophy: The Metaphysics of Law. Routledge. ISBN 978-1-134-38280-4.
- Weber, Max; Coutu, Michel; Rocher, Guy; Leydet, Dominique; Winter, Elke (2001). Rudolf Stammler et le matérialisme historique (in French). Presses Université Laval. ISBN 978-2-7637-7836-5.
