= Reischl =

Reischl is a German surname. Notable people with the surname include:

- Geri Reischl, American actress and singer
- Luka Reischl (born 2004), Austrian football forward

== See also ==
- Max Reischle (1858–1905), German systematic theologian
