= Max Reischle =

Max Wilhelm Theodore Reischle (18 June 1858 – 11 December 1905) was an Austrian-born German Protestant systematic theologian. He was born in Vienna, and died in Tübingen.

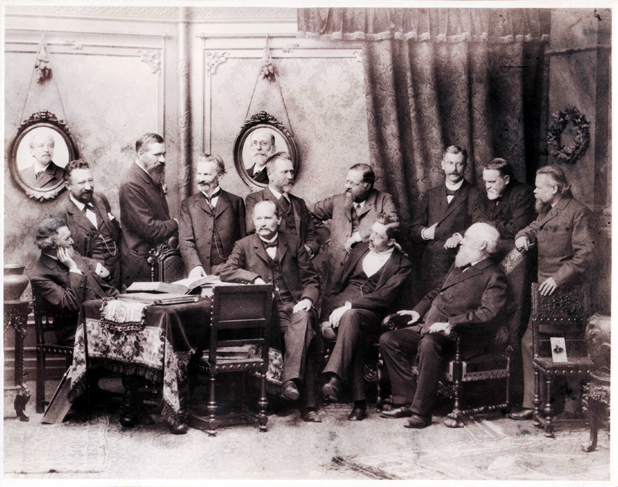
Spirituskreis (1902): Standing, left to right: Georg Wissowa, Eduard Meyer, Alois Riehl, Johannes Conrad, Carl Robert, Rudolf Stammler, Emil Kautzsch, Max Reischle.

In 1887, he received his doctorate at the University of Tübingen, and from 1889 worked as a professor at the Karlsgymnasium in Stuttgart. In 1892, he was appointed a full professor of practical theology at the University of Giessen, then in 1895 become a professor of systematic theology at the University of Göttingen. During the following year, he accepted a call to Halle as chair of systematic theology.

His studies largely dealt with mysticism in theology, the philosophy of religion and the transmission of ethical principles in academic instruction.

== Published works ==
- Die Frage nach dem Wesen der Religion. Grundlagen zu einer Methodologie der theologischen Wissenschaft (1889) – The question of the nature of religion. Foundations for a methodology of theological science.
- Der Glaube an Jesus Christus und die geschichtliche Erforschung seines Lebens (1893) – Faith in Jesus Christ and the historical study of his life.
- Christentum und Entwicklungsgedanke (1898).
- Christliche Glaubenslehre in Leitsätzen für eine akademische Vorlesung entwickelt (1899) – Christian doctrine as guidelines for academic lecture development.
- Werturteile und Glaubensurteile (1900) – Value and belief judgments.
- Die Bibel und das christliche Volksleben (1902).
