= Ancient Roman sarcophagi =

Ancient Roman funerary practice

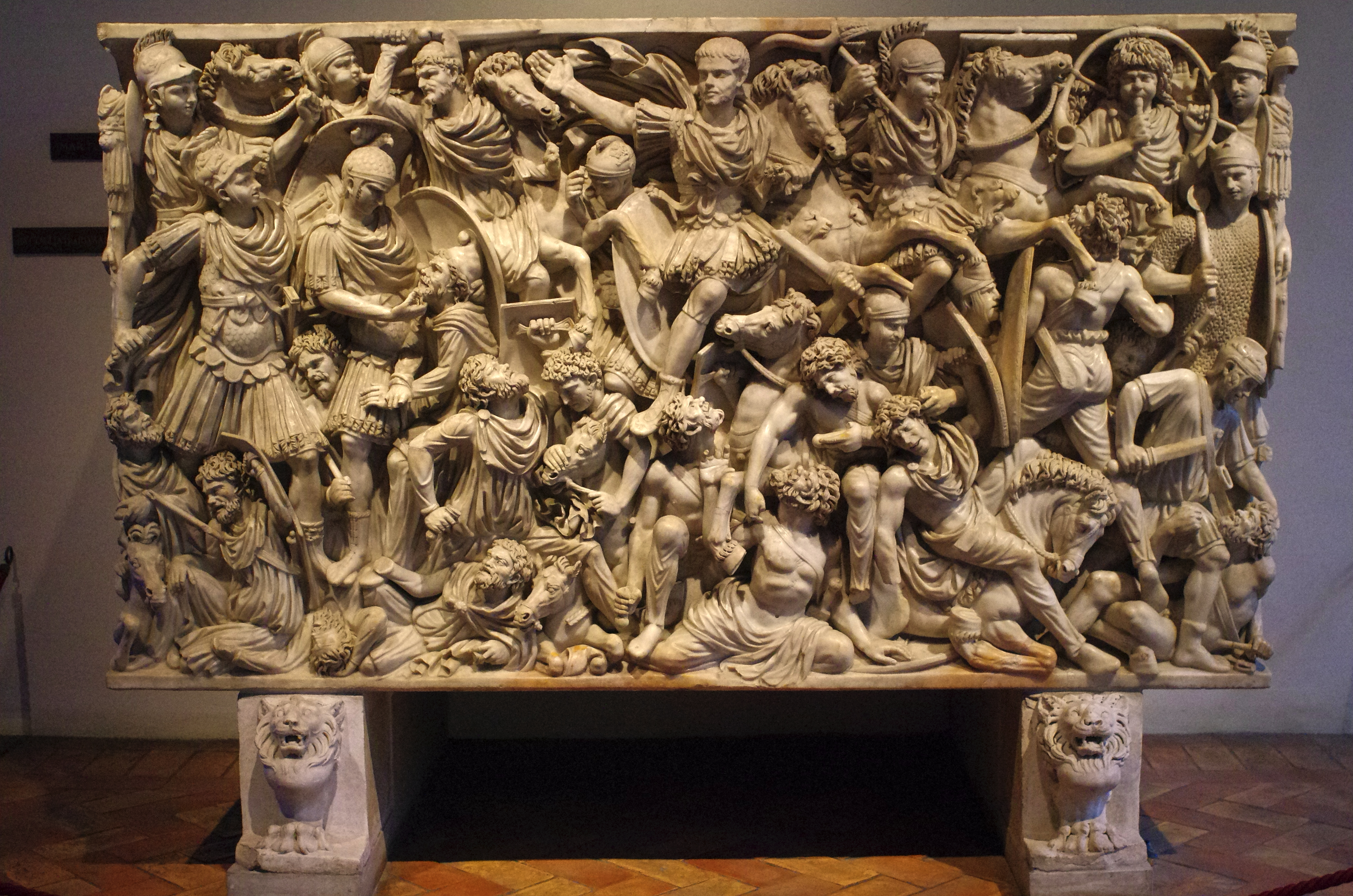
The Ludovisi sarcophagus, an example of the battle scenes favored during the Crisis of the Third Century: the "writhing and highly emotive" Romans and Goths fill the surface in a packed, anti-classical composition

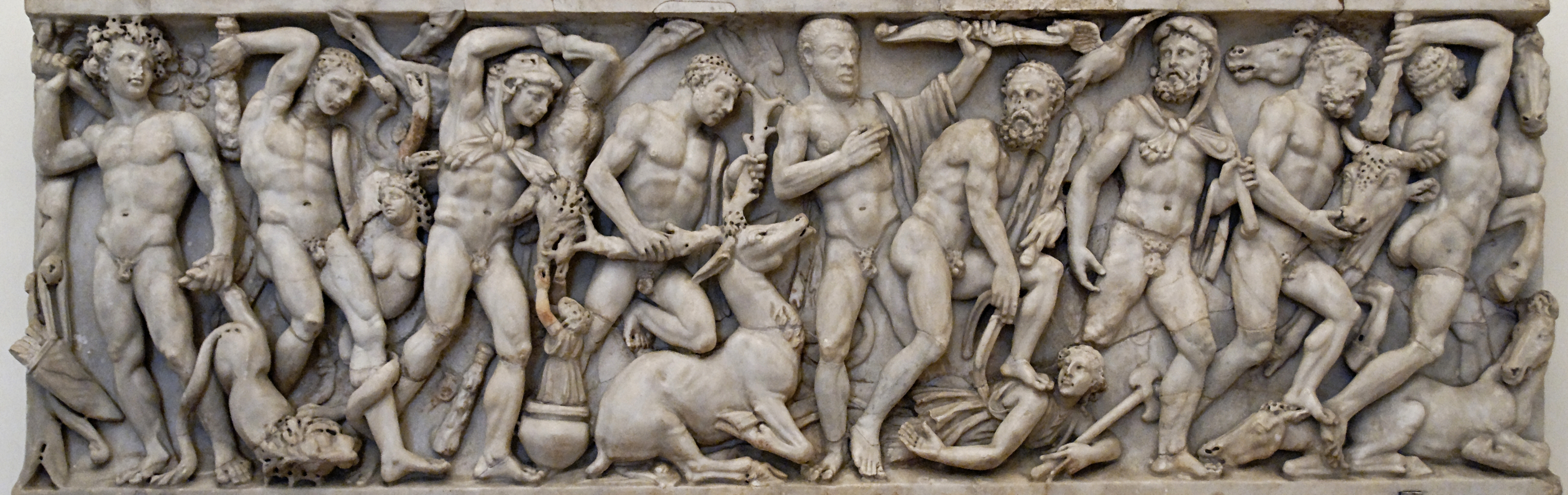
3rd-century sarcophagus depicting the Labours of Hercules, a popular subject for sarcophagi

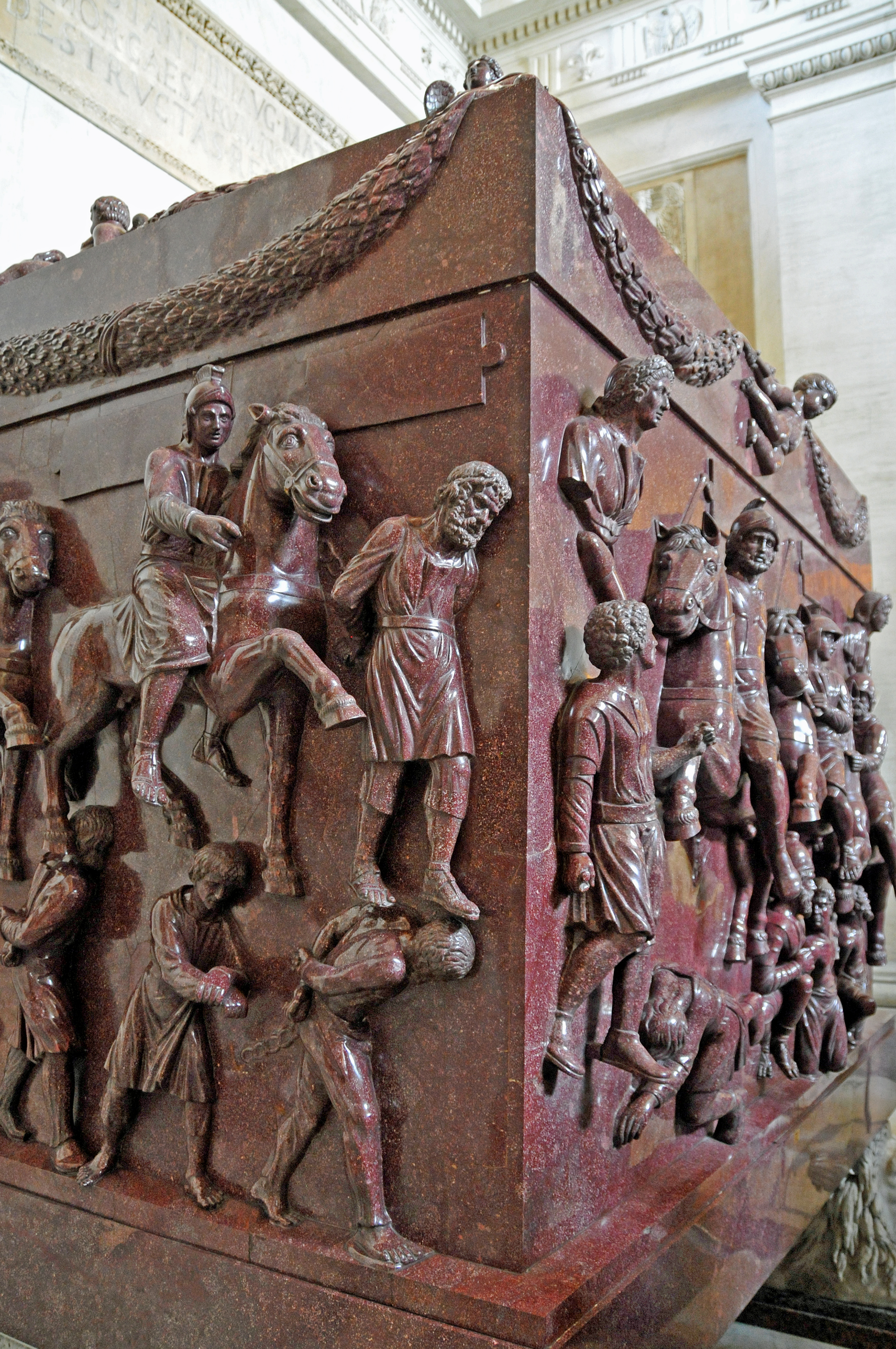
Detail of the sarcophagus of Helena (d. 329) in porphyry

In the burial practices of ancient Rome and Roman funerary art, marble and limestone sarcophagi elaborately carved in relief were characteristic of elite inhumation burials from the second to the fourth centuries AD. At least 10,000 Roman sarcophagi have survived, with fragments possibly representing as many as 20,000. Although mythological scenes have been quite widely studied, sarcophagus relief has been called the "richest single source of Roman iconography," and may also depict the deceased's occupation or life course, military scenes, and other subject matter. The same workshops produced sarcophagi with Jewish or Christian imagery. Early Christian sarcophagi produced from the late third century onward, represent the earliest form of large Christian sculpture, and are important for the study of Early Christian art.

They were mostly made in a few major cities, including Rome and Athens, which exported them to other cities. Elsewhere the stela gravestone remained more common. They were always a very expensive form reserved for the elite, and especially so in the relatively few very elaborately carved examples. Most were relatively plain, with inscriptions, or symbols such as garlands. Sarcophagi divide into a number of styles, by the producing area. "Roman" ones were made to rest against a wall and one side was left uncarved. "Attic" and other types were carved on all four sides; but the short sides were generally less elaborately decorated in both types.

The time taken to make them encouraged the use of standard subjects, to which inscriptions might be added to personalize them, and portraits of the deceased were slow to appear. The sarcophagi offer examples of intricate reliefs that depict scenes often based on Greek and Roman mythology or mystery religions that offered personal salvation, and allegorical representations. Roman funerary art also offers a variety of scenes from everyday life, such as game-playing, hunting, and military endeavors.

Early Christian art quickly adopted the sarcophagus, and they are the most common form of early Christian sculpture, progressing from simple examples with symbols to elaborate fronts, often with small scenes of the Life of Christ in two rows within an architectural framework. The Sarcophagus of Junius Bassus (ca. 359) is of this type, and the earlier Dogmatic Sarcophagus rather simpler. The huge porphyry Sarcophagi of Helena and Constantina are grand Imperial examples.

Cremation was the predominant means of disposing of remains in the Roman Republic. Ashes contained in cinerary urns and other monumental vessels were placed in tombs. From the second century AD onward, inhumation became more common, and after the Roman Empire came under Christian rule, was standard practice. The Sarcophagus of Lucius Cornelius Scipio Barbatus is a rare example from much earlier. A sarcophagus, which means "flesh-eater" in Greek, is a stone coffin used for inhumation burials. Sarcophagi were commissioned not only for the elite of Roman society (mature male citizens), but also for children, entire families, and beloved wives and mothers. The most expensive sarcophagi were made from marble, but other stones, lead, and wood were used as well. Along with the range in production material, there existed a variety of styles and shapes, depending on where the sarcophagus was produced and whom it was produced for.

== History ==
=== Before sarcophagi ===
Inhumation burial practices and the use of sarcophagi were not always the favored Roman funerary custom. The Etruscans and Greeks used sarcophagi for centuries before the Romans finally adopted the practice in the second century. Prior to that period, the dead were usually cremated and placed in marble ash chests or ash altars, or were simply commemorated with a grave altar that was not designed to hold cremated remains. Despite being the main funerary custom during the Roman Republic, ash chests and grave altars virtually disappeared from the market only a century after the advent of the sarcophagus.

It is often assumed that the popularity for sarcophagi began with the Roman aristocracy and gradually became more accepted by the lower classes. However, in the past, the most expensive and ostentatious grave altars and ash chests were commissioned more frequently by wealthy freedmen and other members of the emerging middle class than by the Roman elite. Due to this fact and the lack of inscriptions on early sarcophagi, there is not enough evidence to make a judgment on whether or not the fashion for sarcophagi began with a specific social class. Surviving evidence does indicate that a great majority of early sarcophagi were used for children. This suggests that the change in burial practice may not have simply stemmed from a change in fashion, but perhaps from altered burial attitudes. It is possible that the decision to begin inhuming bodies occurred because families believed that inhumation was a kinder, and less disturbing burial rite than cremation, thus necessitating a shift in burial monument.

=== Stylistic transition from altars and ash chests to sarcophagi ===
Although grave altars and ash chests virtually disappeared from the market in the second century, aspects of their decoration endured in some stylistic elements of sarcophagi. The largest stylistic group of early sarcophagi in the second century is garland sarcophagi, a custom of decoration that was previously used on ash chests and grave altars. Though the premise of the decoration is the same, there are some differences. The garland supports are often human figures instead of the animal heads used previously. In addition, specific mythological scenes fill the field, rather than small birds or other minor scenes. The inscription panel on garland ash altars and chests is also missing on garland sarcophagi. When a sarcophagus did have an inscription, it seemed to be an extra addition and usually ran along the top edge of the chest or between the decorations. The fact that early garland sarcophagi continued the tradition of grave altars with decorated garlands suggests that the customers and sculptors of sarcophagi had similar approaches to those who purchased and produced grave altars. Both monuments employed a similar collection of stylistic motifs with only subtle shifts in iconography.

=== Metropolitan Roman, Attic, and Asiatic sarcophagus production centers ===
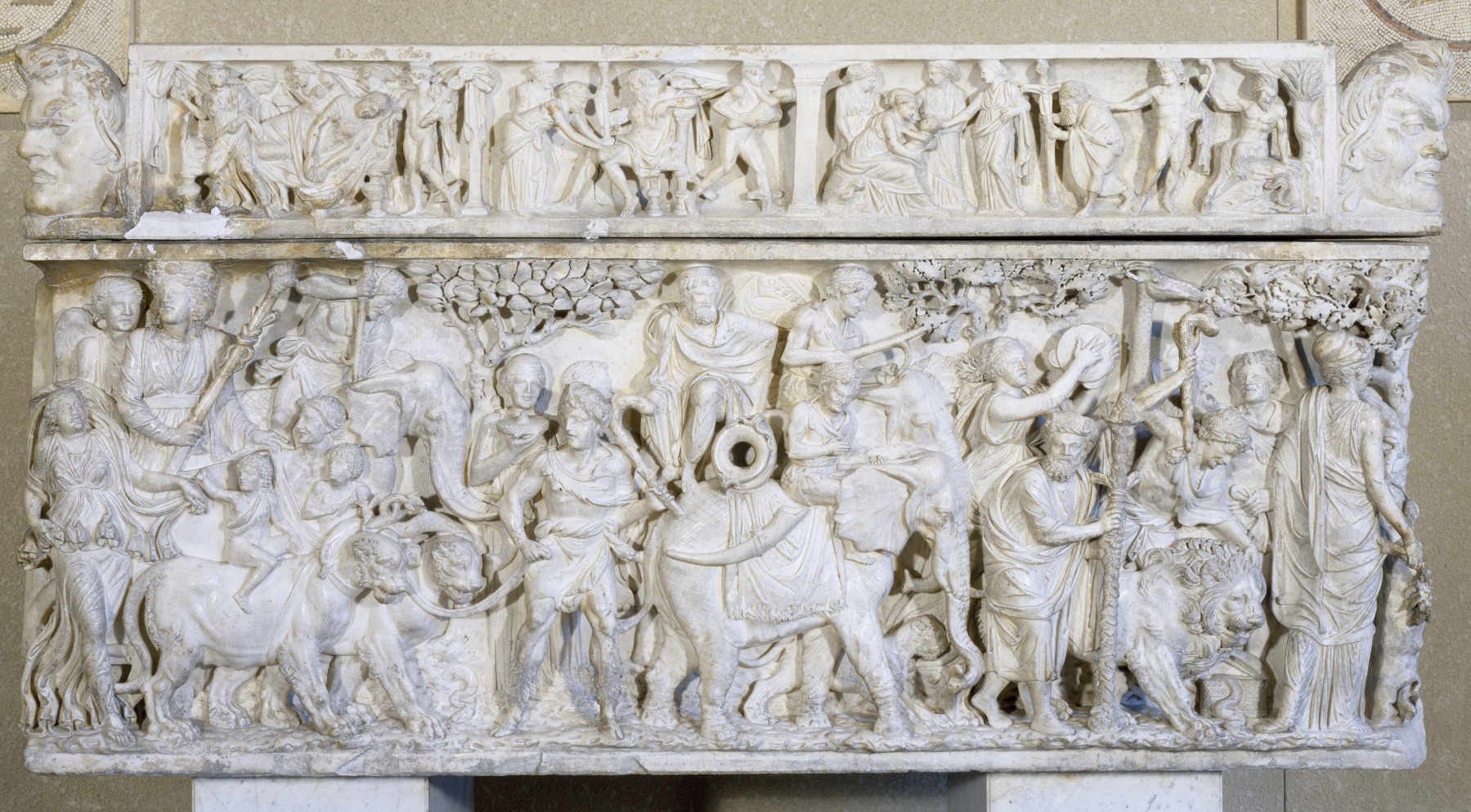
The Sarcophagus with the Triumph of Dionysus is a good example of a Metropolitan Roman-style sarcophagus with its flat lid, three-sided decoration, and Dionysian scenes from Greek mythology.

Sarcophagi production of the ancient Roman Empire involved three main parties: the customer, the sculpting workshop that carved the monument, and the quarry-based workshop that supplied the materials. The distance between these parties was highly variable due to the extensive size of the Empire. Metropolitan Roman, Attic, and Asiatic were the three major regional types of sarcophagi that dominated trade throughout the Roman Empire. Although they were divided into regions, the production of sarcophagi was not so simple as it might appear. For example, Attic workshops were close to Mount Pentelikon, the source of their materials, but were usually very far from their client. The opposite was true for the workshops of Metropolitan Rome, who tended to import large, roughed out sarcophagi from distant quarries in order to complete their commissions. Depending on distance and customer request (some customers might choose to have elements of their sarcophagi left unfinished until a future date, introducing the possibility of further work after the main commission), sarcophagi were in many different stages of production during transport. As a result, it is difficult to develop a standardized model of production.

==== Metropolitan Rome ====
Rome was the primary production center in the western part of the empire. A Metropolitan Roman sarcophagus often took the shape of a low rectangular box with a flat lid. As the sarcophagus was usually placed in a niche or against a wall in a mausoleum, they were usually only decorated on the front and two shorter sides. Many were decorated with carvings of garlands and fruits and leaves, as well as narrative scenes from Greek mythology. Battle and hunting scenes, biographical events from the life of the deceased, portrait busts, the profession of the deceased and abstract designs were also popular.

==== Attic ====
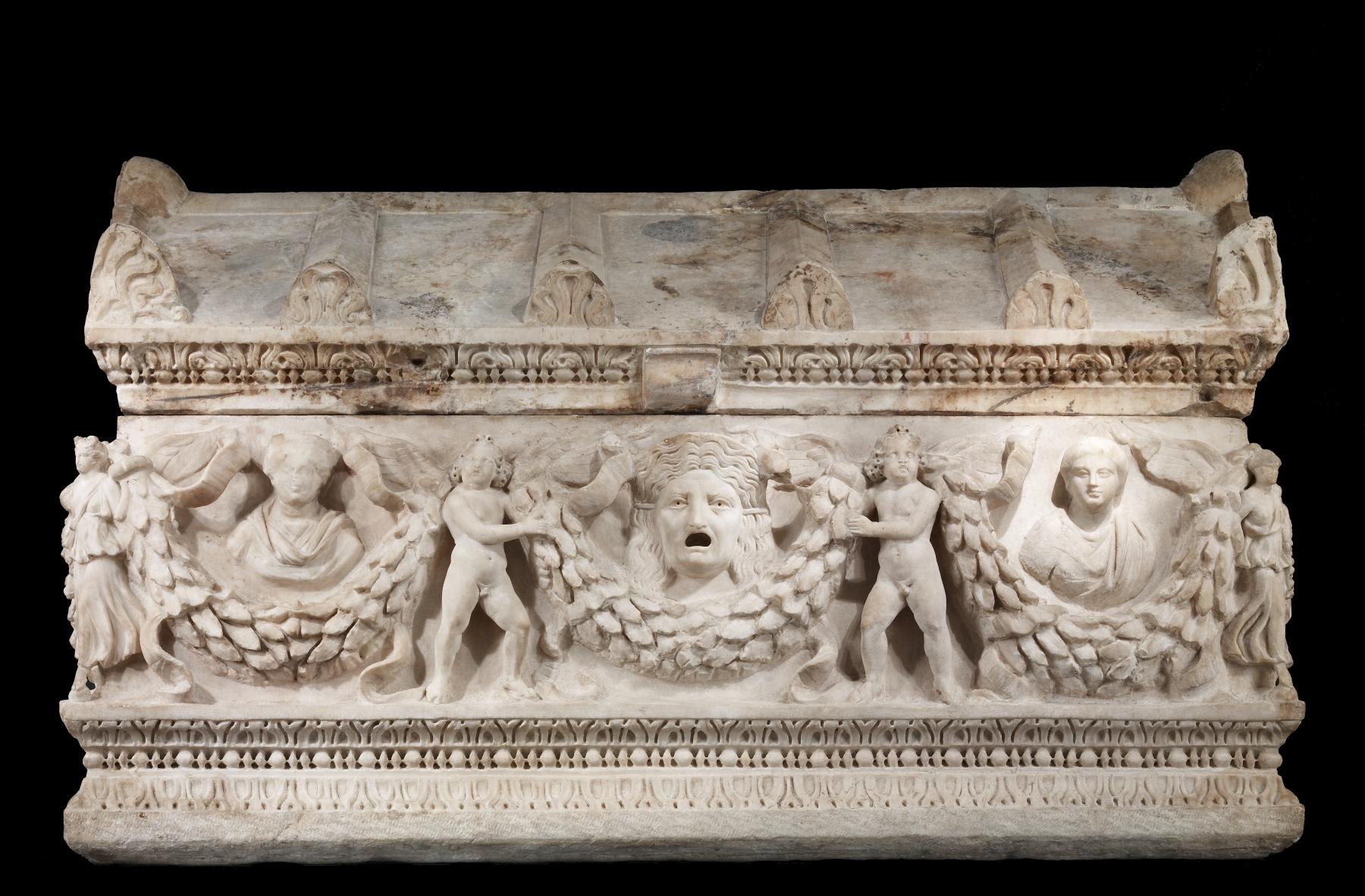
Asiatic garland sarcophagus, the predominant type during the reigns of Trajan and Hadrian (Walters Art Museum), dated between 150 and 180 A.D., in Dokimeion marble, so probably made in Phrygia and then shipped to Rome. The gable-roof lid exemplifies the garland tradition common on ash altars and chests. It also has several incomplete parts on its four sides, suggesting the work was interrupted or it was needed on short notice.

Athens was the main production center for Attic style sarcophagi. These workshops mainly produced sarcophagi for export. They were rectangular in shape and were often decorated on all four sides, unlike the Metropolitan Roman style, with ornamental carvings along the bottom and upper edge of the monument. The lids were also different from the flat metropolitan Roman style and featured a pitched gable roof, or a kline lid, which is carved in the style of couch cushions on which the form of the deceased reclines. The great majority of these sarcophagi also featured mythological subjects, especially the Trojan War, Achilles, and battles with the Amazons.

==== Asia Minor (Asiatic) ====
The Dokimeion workshops in Phrygia specialized in architecturally formed large-scale Asiatic sarcophagi. Many featured a series of columns joined by an entablature on all four sides with human figures in the area between the columns. The lids were often made in the gabled-roof design in order to complete the architectural-style sarcophagi so the coffin formed a sort of house or temple for the deceased. Other cities in Asia Minor produced sarcophagi of the garland tradition as well. In general, the sarcophagi were decorated on either three or four sides, depending on whether they were to be displayed on a pedestal in an open-air setting or against the walls inside tombs.

=== Myth and meaning on ancient Roman sarcophagi ===
A transition from the classical garland and seasonal reliefs with smaller mythological figures to a greater focus on full mythological scenes began with the break up of the classical style in the late second century toward the end of Marcus Aurelius' reign. This shift led to the development of popular themes and meanings portrayed through mythological scenes and allegories. The most popular mythological scenes on Roman sarcophagi functioned as aids to mourning, visions of life and happiness, and opportunities for self-portrayal for Roman citizens.

Images of Meleager, the hero who slew the Calydonian Boar, being mourned by his lover and hunting companion Atlanta, as well as images of Achilles mourning Patroclus were very common on sarcophagi that acted as grieving aids. In both cases, the mythological scenes were akin to mourning practices of ordinary Roman citizens in an effort to reflect their grief and comfort them when they visited the tomb. Playful images depicting Nereids, Dionysiac triumphs, and love scenes of Dionysus and Ariadne were also commonly represented on sarcophagi. It is possible that these scenes of happiness and love in the face of death and mourning encouraged the living to enjoy life while they could, and reflected the celebration and meals that the mourners would later enjoy in the tomb when they returned to visit the deceased. The third century involved the return in popularity of self-representation on Roman sarcophagi.

There were several different ways Roman citizens approached self-representation on sarcophagi. Some sarcophagi had representations of the face or full figure of the deceased. In other cases, mythological portraits were used to connect characteristics of the deceased with traits of the hero or heroine portrayed. For example, common mythological portraits of deceased women identified them with women of lauded traits in myth, such as the devoted Selene or loyal Alcestis. Scenes featuring the figures of Meleager and Achilles expressed bravery and were often produced on sarcophagi holding deceased men. Biographical scenes that emphasize the true virtues of Roman citizens were also used to commemorate the deceased. Scholars argue that these biographical scenes, as well as the comparisons to mythological characters, suggest that self-portrayal on Roman sarcophagi did not exist to celebrate the traits of the deceased, but rather to emphasize favored Roman cultural values and to demonstrate that the family of the deceased were educated members of the elite who could understand difficult mythological allegories.

=== Third- and fourth-century sarcophagi ===
The breakup of the classical style led to a period in which full mythological reliefs with an increase in the number of figures and an elongation of forms became more popular, as discussed above. The proportion of figures on the reliefs also became increasingly unbalanced, with the main figures taking up the greatest area with smaller figures crowded in the small pockets of empty space. In the third century, another transition in theme and style of sarcophagi involved the return in popularity of representing mythological and non-mythological portraits of the deceased. Imagery of the four seasons also becomes popular during the third and fourth centuries. With the advent of Christianity in the third century, traditional motifs, such as the seasons, remained, and images representing a belief in the afterlife appeared.

The change in style brought by Christianity is perhaps most significant, as it signals a change in emphasis on images of retrospection, and introduced images of an afterlife.

== Themes and imagery ==
=== The Tragic Sarcophagi ===
==== The Massacre of the Niobids ====
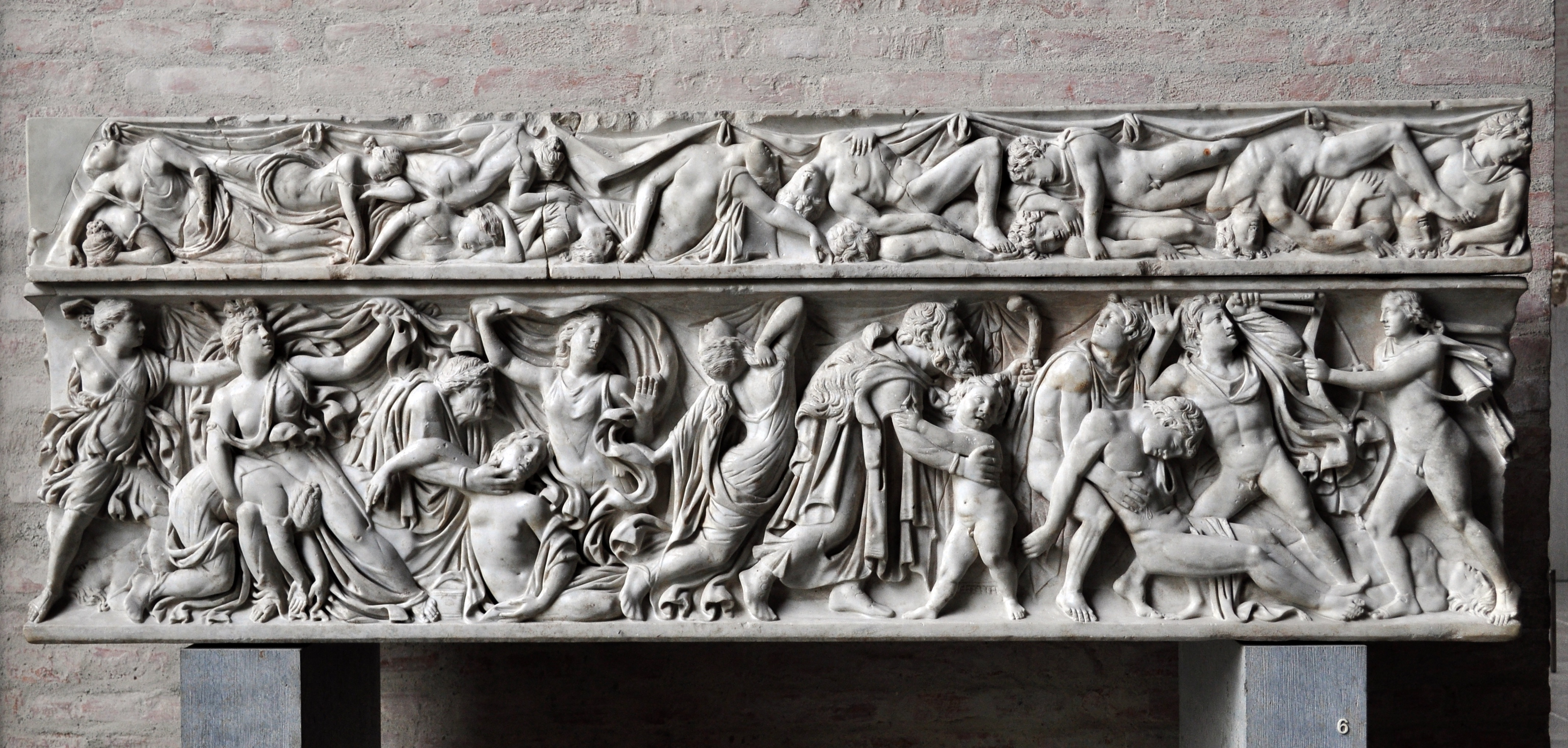
Roman sarcophagus showing the massacre of Niobeʼs children. Ca 160 A.D. Glyptothek, Munich

The story of Niobe and her 14 children is a tragic one. Niobe, after having so many children that reached maturity, bragged about having so many children to Leto, who had only two. This act of hubris was unforgivable to the Titan, so she sent her two children, Apollo and Artemis, to kill her children. According to Ovid's version, the twins kill the sons first while they practice riding outside the city, and then they kill the daughters as they are mourning their brothers and fathers. In the myth, supposedly the father kills himself out of grief after their seven sons die, and when Artemis has killed all but the youngest daughter, Niobe begs for her to be spared. Alas, she is not spared, and out of grief Niobe turns to stone.

On the Sarcophagus showing the massacre of Niobe's children, carved ca. 160 A.D. and now in Munich's Glyptothek, Artemis is depicted on the far left shooting five female Niobids (“Niobids” is a term for the children of Niobe), with Apollo on the far right shooting five male Niobids, both of which have a dead child laying at their feet. The front of this sarcophagus only shows ten Niobids, but two more are depicted on either side of it. There are also two bearded Pedagogues shown trying to save the Niobids on the front and a nurse on the left trying to do the same on the front, along with Niobe on the left trying to protect one of her daughters. The lid depicts all 14 corpses stacked on top of one another in a disorderly fashion, emphasizing the heartlessness of this tragedy.

This myth is used on relatively few sarcophagi, but like many other sarcophagi depicting tragedies, the intention behind this imagery is to show the viewer how tragic the death of their loved one was. All 14 Niobids were taken as children, which is a tragedy in that they had so much longer to live and more things to do, and the manner in which they died is also highly tragic. Niobe, especially, must have felt very upset with the loss of her children, since she was previously so happy to have had so many children, she had farther to fall emotionally. Plus, she lost her husband due to this massacre, so she was truly alone in the world. The person who picked out this sarcophagus for their loved one likely saw themselves as Niobe and their loved one as the Niobids, left behind after a tragedy to mourn alone. This imagery was not used to comfort those left behind, but to emphasize to the latter what had been lost, and perhaps they found solace in comparing their own loss to that of Niobe.

==== Medea/Creusa ====
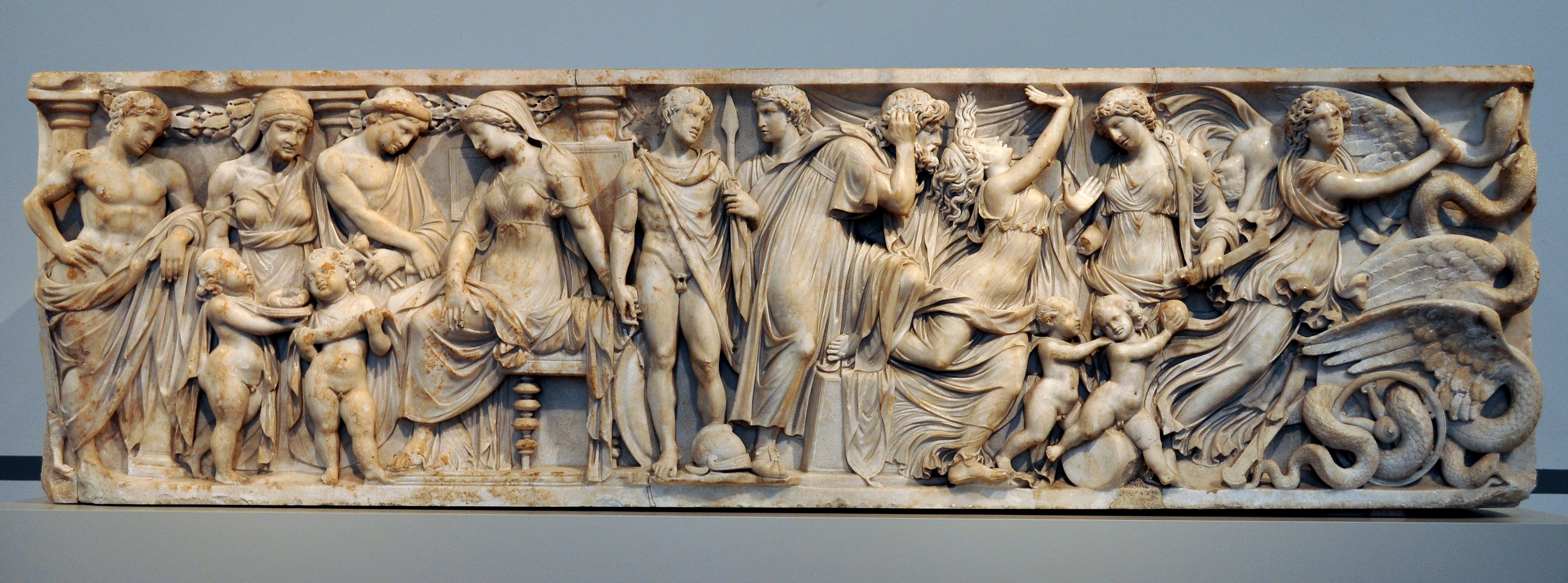
Roman sarcophagus showing the story of Medea and Creusa. Ca 150 A.D. Altes Museum, Berlin

Euripides wrote a canonical drama depicting Medea in which she betrays her father, Aeëtes, king of Colchis, to help Jason, leader of the Argonauts, steal the Golden Fleece. Then, they sail to Corinth, where they live together happily for a few years and have two children. Eventually, Jason repudiates Medea in order to marry the princess of Corinth, Creusa (or sometimes referred to as Glauce). Medea does not take lightly to this, since she gave up everything for Jason, so in her rage, she infuses a golden diadem and a robe with poisonous magic, and has her two sons deliver the lethal gifts to the princess. Creusa puts them on, assuming these gifts innocuous, and catches on fire, her flesh melting from the magical enchantments. Her father, Creon, attempts to pull the gifts off his daughter, but he too dies from this contact. Both Creon and Creusa/Glauce thus suffer horrible deaths. For the final touch, Medea kills her own children, takes their corpses, and rides off on her chariot drawn by snakes.

A good example of its presentation on Roman sarcophagi is the piece carved ca. 150 A.D. and now in Berlin's Altes Museum. Reading it from left to right, we see, first, Jason standing and watching as his and Medea's two young sons prepare to carry the two poisoned gifts to the princess Creusa, while their aged nurse watches over them; and then just to the right, Jason again, paying a visit to the seated princess. The center is given over to the princess's horrific end: Creon looks on Creusa in horror as his daughter flails about, screaming, flames shooting up from her forehead, as she dies a gruesome death. To the right of that, Medea is shown drawing her sword, about to kill her children playing innocently at her feet, and then on the far right she escapes in her chariot drawn by winged serpents, with one child's corpse over her shoulder, while the leg of the other dangles limply from the back of the chariot.

The use of this story on sarcophagi is not to compare the deceased to Medea, but rather to Creusa. Showing Creusa perfectly happy and youthful in the first half of the imagery and immediately following it up with her tragic death and the horrible death of Medea's children emphasizes the immense loss that the family feels. When one imagines their loved one as Creusa, it seems that she had everything waiting for her in life but was cruelly stolen from our world far before her time, and Creon likewise functions as a stand-in for the family member of the deceased who would feel the loss of their loved one most. Particularly in the time of the Romans, the greatest achievement in a woman's life was marriage, and the worst disaster her death. As such, the imagery on Medea sarcophagi show the highest point of her life, followed by her sudden, terrible death, making the tragedy all the worse through the surprise of the family.

==== Abduction of Persephone ====
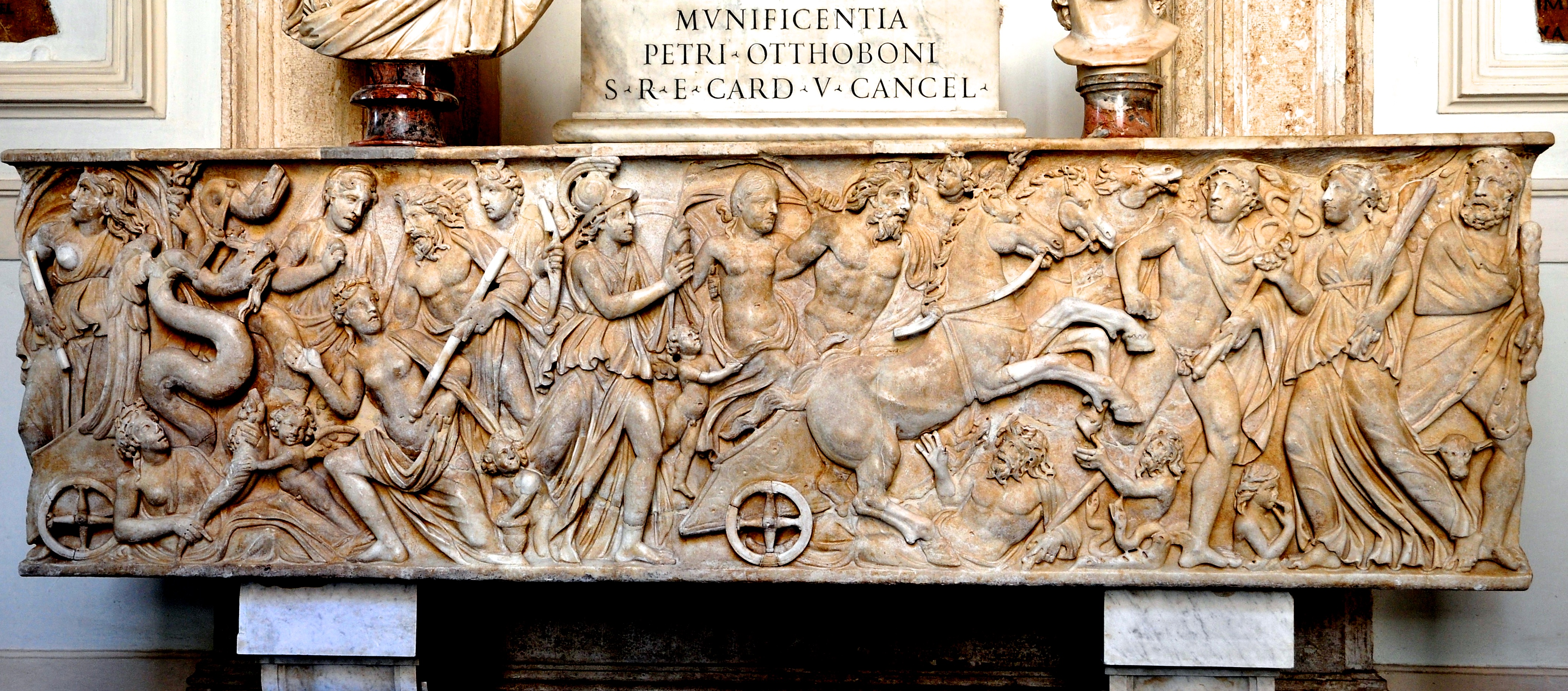
Roman sarcophagus showing the abduction of Persephone. Ca. 230–240 A.D. Capitoline Museum, Rome

Several versions of the myth of the abduction of Persephone survive from antiquity, the Homeric Hymn to Demeter being one, and the Roman version in Ovid’s Metamorphoses being another. In the Homeric Hymn to Demeter, Persephone is picking flowers in a field with other goddesses, among them Artemis and Athena, when the ground suddenly opens up. Hades flies out of it on his chariot, grabs Persephone, and whisks her away to the underworld. When Demeter, her mother, finds out what happened, she prevents crops from growing and imposing a perpetual winter, and therefore preventing the deities from receiving the offerings they so desire. Zeus, in exchange for her stopping her punishment, sends Hermes down to the Underworld to order Hades to bring her back, and he obliged. However, Hades had earlier offered Persephone pomegranate seeds, and she had eaten four, binding her to him as his wife (the eating of pomegranates, a symbol of sexual awakening and fertility, played a role in Greek weddings). Zeus thus determined that Persephone would spend eight months of every year above ground, with her mother and allowing the growth of crops, while the other four months, one for each seed eaten, would see her rejoin her dark husband in the gloom of the Underworld and resulting in winter. In Ovid’s version, there is a stronger emphasis on Hades’ love for Persephone.

A sarcophagus in Rome's Capitoline Museum, carved between 230 and 240 A.D., renders the scene in detail. It depicts Hades snatching Persephone (here she bears the portrait features of the dead woman buried within) as the central image, with Athena reaching out toward them in an attempt to prevent the abduction from taking place. Demeter is on her chariot pulled by serpents on the far left, a way of visualizing her wrath, even though she was not present during the abduction. Depicted between her and Athena is a scene of Hades surprising Persephone, Persephone looking unwilling, Aphrodite above her urging her to go with him, and Artemis behind Hades readying her bow to protect her companion. On the far right, Hermes is seen leading Hades’ horses, Nike with a wreath in her right hand and a palm branch in her left, and Hercules with his club.

This myth was used often as a theme on sarcophagi for a woman, with the head of Persephone as she gets abducted commonly being a portrait of the deceased that was buried in the sarcophagus (seen in the Sarcophagus with the Rape of Persephone, ca. 230–240). The image of Demeter, Artemis, and Athena are meant to invoke the same sense of tragedy and grief that the Roman individual who got this for their loved one would feel, through the perspective of Demeter's own loss. Persephone, as the deceased loved one that rests within, was taken in her prime, without the chance of leading a full life. The tragedy of the loss of the deceased is felt throughout their own personal world, just as in the Hymn to Demeter. Additionally, this imagery could also have been used on other sarcophagi that put portrait features on Hades riding his chariot to show that the husband, who perhaps died first, is finally in union with his wife again in the afterlife. Rather than evoking a sense of tragedy of her loss, it could bring some reprieve to the family members the deceased left behind that they are finally united with their spouse in the afterlife.

=== Sarcophagi with 'Erotic Sleepers' ===
Among the most common themes depicted on Roman sarcophagi spread over a hundred years are variants of the 'erotic sleeper'. The finality of death was avoided through depictions of the deceased as asleep. Rather than dealing with the permanent loss of a loved one, they could be imagined as still present in a way, and somewhat aware of the world around them. Sleep allowed for hope amongst the living that they may one day reunite with the deceased in dreams or in their own eternal sleep. Frequently used mythological subjects included sarcophagi reliefs featuring the moon goddess Selene and the sleeping shepherd-hunter Endymion as well as reliefs featuring the god of wine Dionysus and the sleeping figure of Ariadne, which further introduced an erotic-romantic note into these scenes, celebrating the romantic love that the deceased couple had enjoyed.

==== Selene and Endymion ====
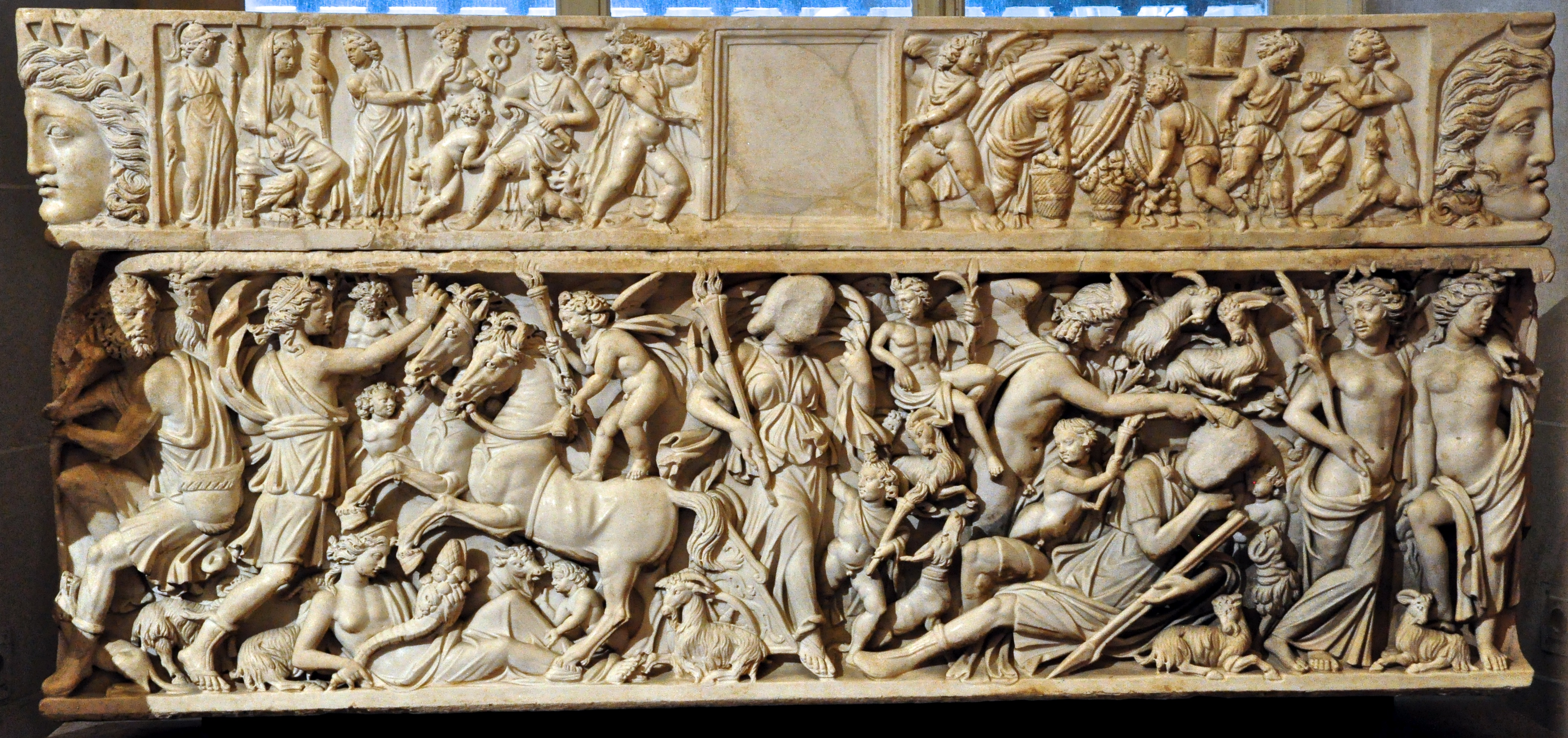
Roman sarcophagus showing Selene approaching Endymion. Ca. 230–240 A.D. Louvre, Paris

As commonly seen on sarcophagi featuring the myth of Selene and Endymion — a good example is the sarcophagus carved ca. 230–240 A.D. and now in the Louvre — Selene is depicted as descending from her chariot pulled by horses or sometimes oxen. Endymion lies before her, stretched out in a pose signifying sleep before the viewer, sometimes on a rock. Cupids surround the couple, representing their love. Oftentimes, either the god Hypnos, the personification of sleep, or the goddess Nox, the personification of night, are pictured carrying a poppy in one hand and pouring a sleeping potion over Endymion with the other, reiterating his eternal slumber. Pastoral imagery of shepherds, flocks of animals, and herding dogs are scattered throughout setting the tone of felicity and peace. Other deities may be seen throughout these reliefs representing physical or cosmic aspects of the myth.

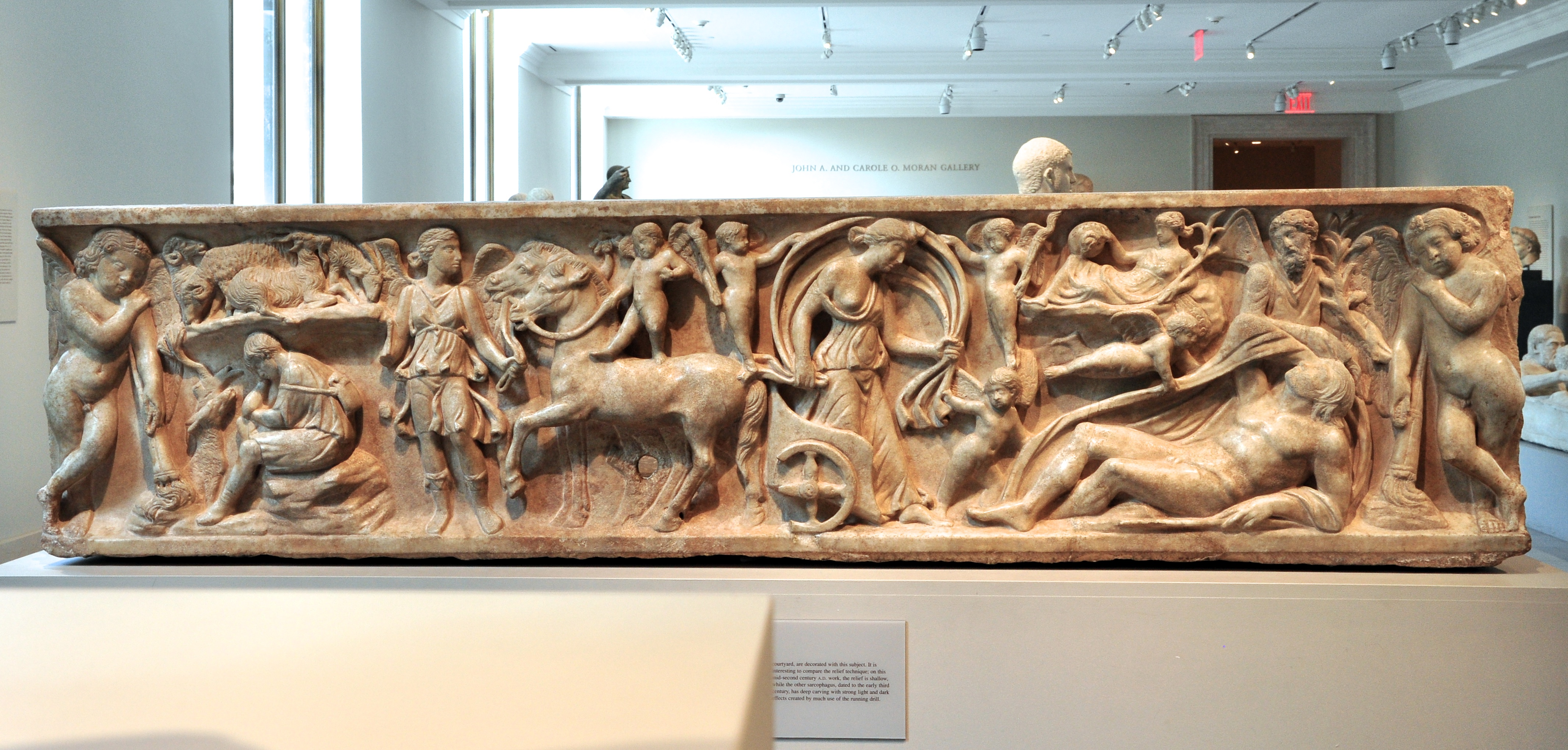
Roman sarcophagus showing Selene approaching Endymion; mourning Cupids at corners. Ca. 150 A.D. Metropolitan Museum, New York

Sarcophagi of this nature that were intended for a man may be read as a portrayal of a wife visiting her deceased husband and moreover, a reflection of the viewer's own experience approaching their deceased loved one. Selene carries a torch or is accompanied by cupids carrying torches in order to light her way in the night similar to how a visitor to the deceased would carry a torch to see in the darkness of a tomb. As seen on an early (ca. 150 A.D.) sarcophagus in the Metropolitan Museum of Art in New York City featuring Selene and Endymion, the cupids at the corners invert their torches as a customary Roman sign of mourning further emphasizing the funerary context. Selene can also be seen carrying a garland representative of the banquets and feasts that were held at tomb sites. The background characters of nymphs, shepherds, and cupids play the role of other familial visitors gathered around a sarcophagus to visit their beloved deceased. Many sarcophagi featuring Selene and Endymion have portrait features or the faces of Selene and Endymion carved out for portrait features, furthering the connection between Selene as wife and Endymion as husband.

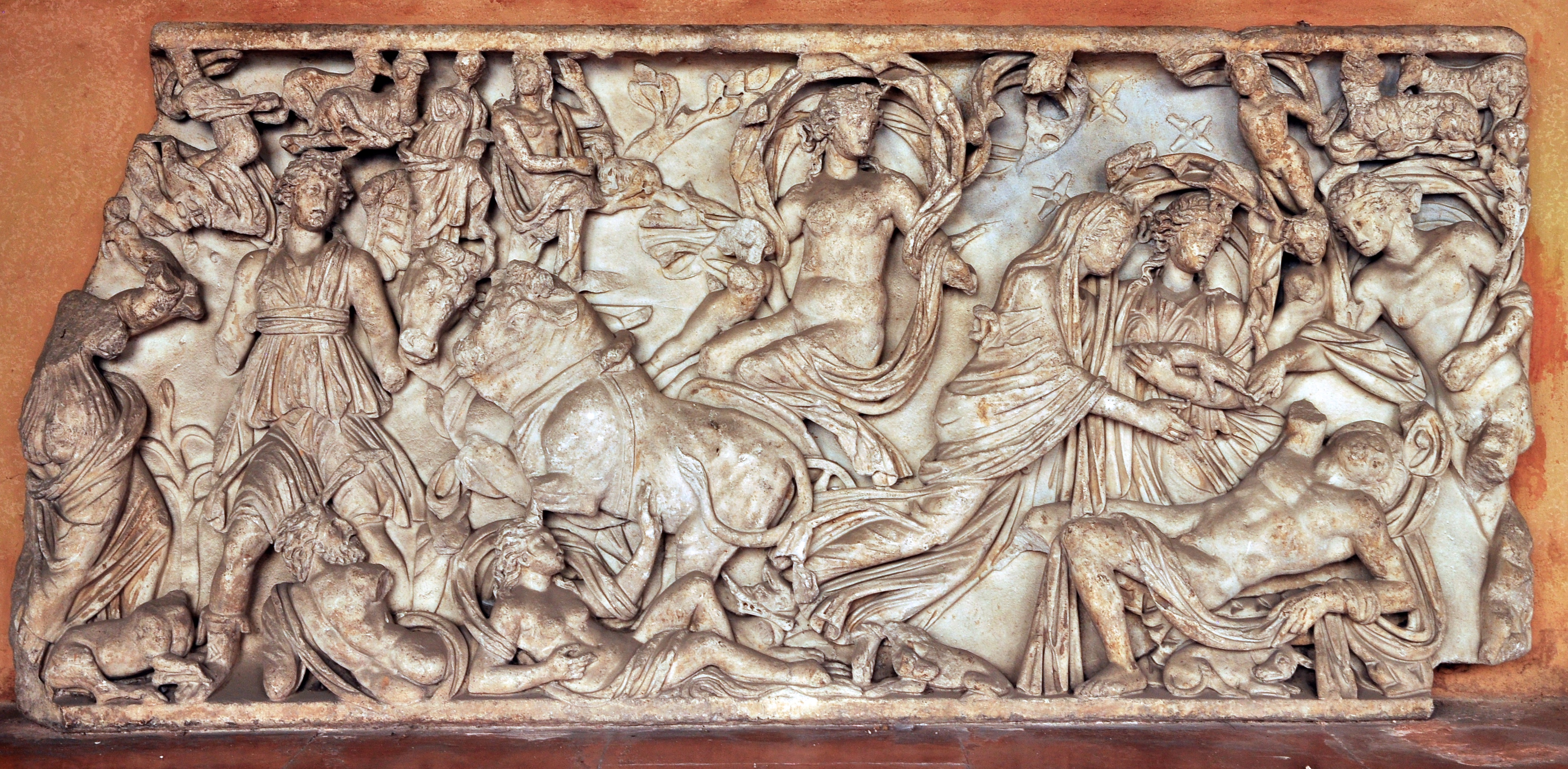
Roman sarcophagus showing Selene approaching Endymion. Ca. 200–200 A.D. San Paolo fuori le mura, Rome

While Selene and Endymion can still be imagined as a husband and wife, it was possible for Selene to be imagined as a representation of a deceased wife, and Endymion as a living husband. Specifically seen in a sarcophagus in Rome's cathedral of San Paolo fuori le mura, Selene is figured as an apparition of a bride, since she is here shown floating and dressed in bridal drapery. In this case, Endymion is imagined to be sleeping and representative of the husband of the deceased woman. The deceased bride is visiting her sleeping husband in his dreams. Above her are three stars, along with the vestiges of two small boys, who are probably personifications of Phosphorus and Hesperus, the morning and evening stars. Their presence implies that Selene's visits occur between the evening and morning and are also representative of recurring dream visits by the deceased.

Looking at Selene and Endymion as representative of a married couple, the myth relates a cosmic love. Helios and Selene are often pictured on opposite ends of these sarcophagi representing the cycle of night and day that continues eternally. The depiction of Tellus, the personification of the Earth, as sometimes seen as a background character to these sarcophagi, also displays the cosmic significance of their love. The cupids, as well as loosely draped clothing on Selene, convey an erotic tone. Endymion is often exposed and has suggestively draped clothing either pointed out or further accentuated by cupids or extra characters such as Hypnos.

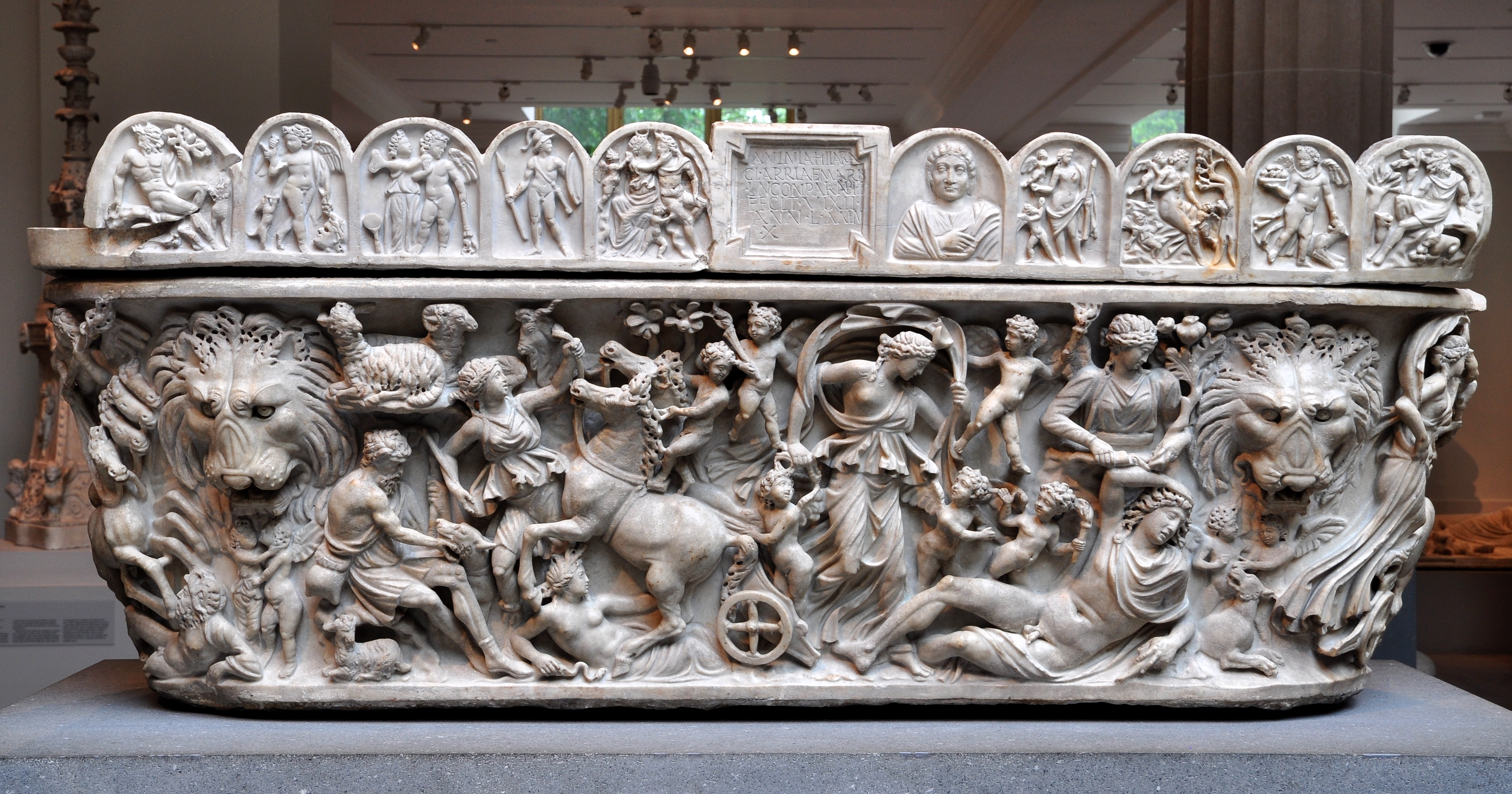
Roman sarcophagus showing Selene approaching Endymion. Ca. 200–220 A.D. Metropolitan Museum, New York

Occasionally, Selene and Endymion sarcophagi are used to represent familial love rather than erotic marital love. A good example is another Selene and Endymion sarcophagus in New York's Metropolitan Museum, a huge and exquisitely carved piece carved ca. 200–220 A.D. This one features a portrait and inscription on the lid explaining that the sarcophagus was commissioned by a daughter for her mother. The placement of the portrait above the goddess was likely done to emphasize the beauty of the mother and describe her as coming to visit her sleeping family similar to other sarcophagi of this subject. Endymion would then be a broad representation of family rather than a husband. A child sarcophagus commissioned by his parents displaying this subject matter was likely comparing the child's beauty to that of Endymion rather than as something Romantic. The erotic nature of the myth is toned down and the focus is placed on the deceased imagined as Endymion resting in eternal sleep.

In a more general sense, the idea of eternal sleep rather than death provided comfort to the living family of the deceased. The removal of the finality of death brought about hope that the departed was not truly gone. Sleep leaves a person in a state where they are not present or aware of the world around them resonating deeply with death. The use of pastoral imagery as seen in shepherds further relays the peace and comfort that comes with sleep. Flocks of animals on these sarcophagi or even the shepherds are often seen sleeping similar to Endymion or the deceased. If the deceased is imagined as Selene coming to visit in dreams, the remaining family is comforted by the potential nighttime visits they can have with their beloved.

==== Dionysus and Ariadne ====
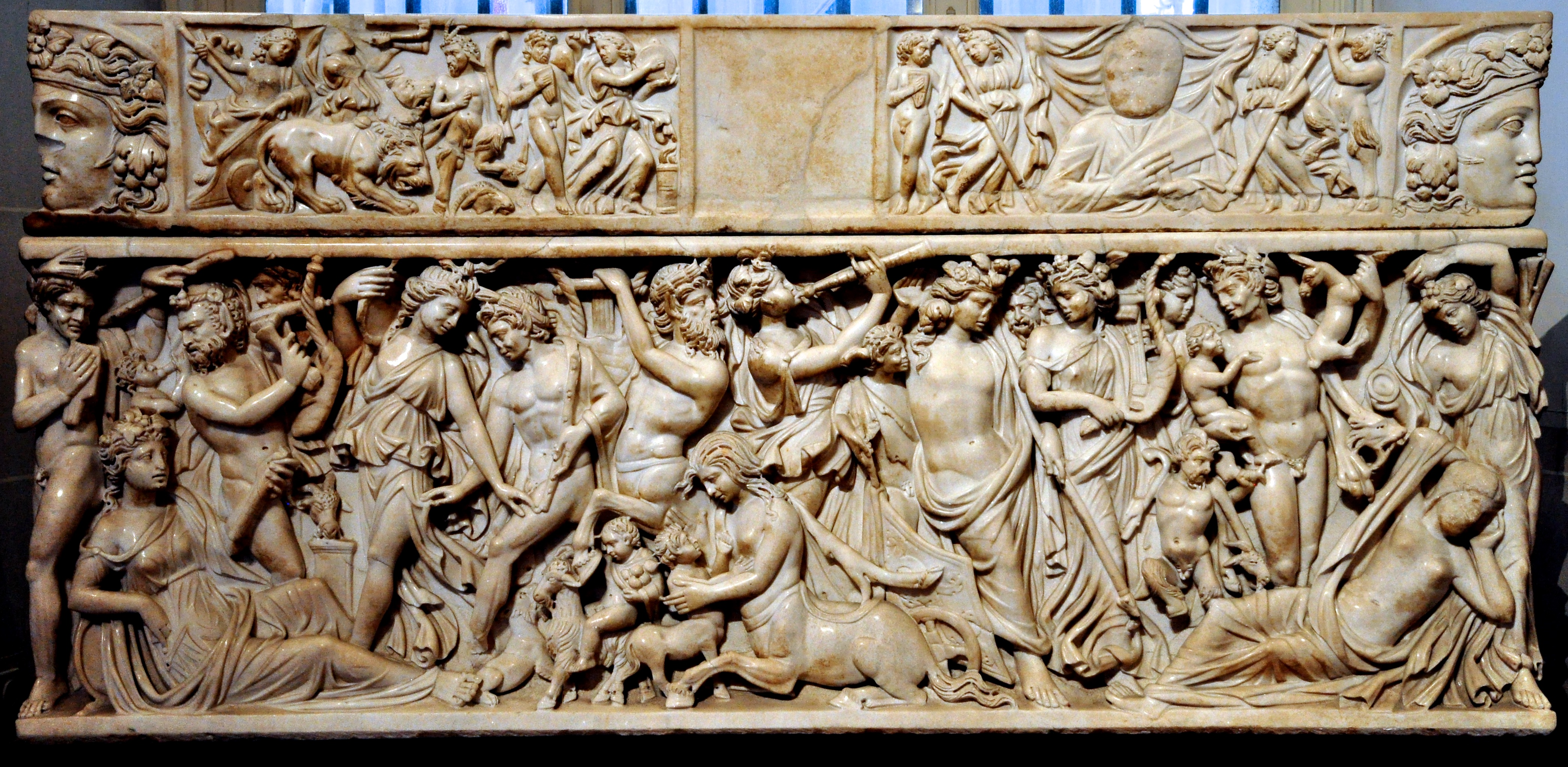
Roman sarcophagus showing Dionysus approaching Ariadne. Ca. 230–240 A.D. Louvre, Paris

Sarcophagi featuring Dionysus and Ariadne show the drunken Dionysus propped up by a satyr as he gazes upon his beloved Ariadne for the first time. He stands before her sleeping form as she faces the viewer, her body exposed. The remainder of the sarcophagi depicts the procession of Dionysiac revelers celebrating with song and dance. Ariadne is oftentimes given portrait features or was prepared to have portrait features. Comparisons to Ariadne are used to exemplify beauty and likely did just that for the deceased. Similar to the Selene and Endymion sarcophagi, the deceased is meant to be imagined as Ariadne being visited by her husband in the form of Dionysus. The way in which Dionysus gazes upon Ariadne is meant to evoke intense and eternal love between the pair as well as the deceased and their loved one. Ariadne is imagined to then be taken up to live happily amongst Dionysus and his revelers, providing comfort for the family that their own deceased continues to enjoy happiness even in death. Matching pairs of sleeper sarcophagi, now displayed in the Louvre in Paris, were found in Bordeaux with one displaying the myth of Selene and Endymion and the other the myth of Dionysus and Ariadne. It is believed that the Selene and Endymion sarcophagus contained the husband while the Dionysus and Ariadne sarcophagus contained the wife, drawing a direct comparison between the sleeper and deceased. The scenes of cosmic love, as well as matching sarcophagi featuring a sleeping deceased, exemplified the bond between husband and wife. The Dionysus and Ariadne sarcophagus of this pairing featured a centaur family amongst the revelers. This familial image held no significance in the myth, but rather, is used as a bridge between the myth and the life of a Roman visitor.

=== Dionysian Imagery ===
One of the more curious examples of mythological and biographical sarcophagi are those featuring Dionysian imagery. Dionysus (or, as the Romans called him, Bacchus) is known as a god of celebration and revelry, particularly of wine, and the wild areas of the world outside the cities. As such he and symbolism associated with him were popular for their ability to show scenes of joy or relaxation. Dionysian imagery is usually shown through the use of wine, grapes, and a generally festive atmosphere. Dionysus is often associated with large predatory cats, especially lionesses, and as such images of felines tend to crop up often as well. Dionysus is often shown as a young man, beardless, often drunken. His bride, Ariadne, is also depicted often, either enjoying time with her husband, or sleeping, being approached by the procession of her future husband Dionysus.

==== Various Shapes of Dionysian Sarcophagi ====
Most Roman sarcophagi are rectangular in shape, and as such, as a deity known for ignoring conventions in his mythology, Dionysian sarcophagi sometimes fittingly go against even this most basic convention of the art. Sarcophagi with Dionysian imagery often feature ends that are curved and rounded off, rather than squared off. Sarcophagi with this shape are called lenos Sarcophagi, named after Greek and Roman term for a wine vat, i.e., the tub in which grapes were crushed and fermented during the process of creating wine. This lends to the metaphorical connection ripening of the body of the deceased as it decomposes and the fermenting of the grapes as they begin to form wine. This type of shape is also used to represent the passage of time, the rounded edge allowing for the imagery of unending cycles that cannot easily be represented across the corners of a traditional sarcophagus. Several of the sarcophagi with Dionysian imagery shown in this section are of lenos shape.

==== Basic Conventions of Dionysian Sarcophagi ====
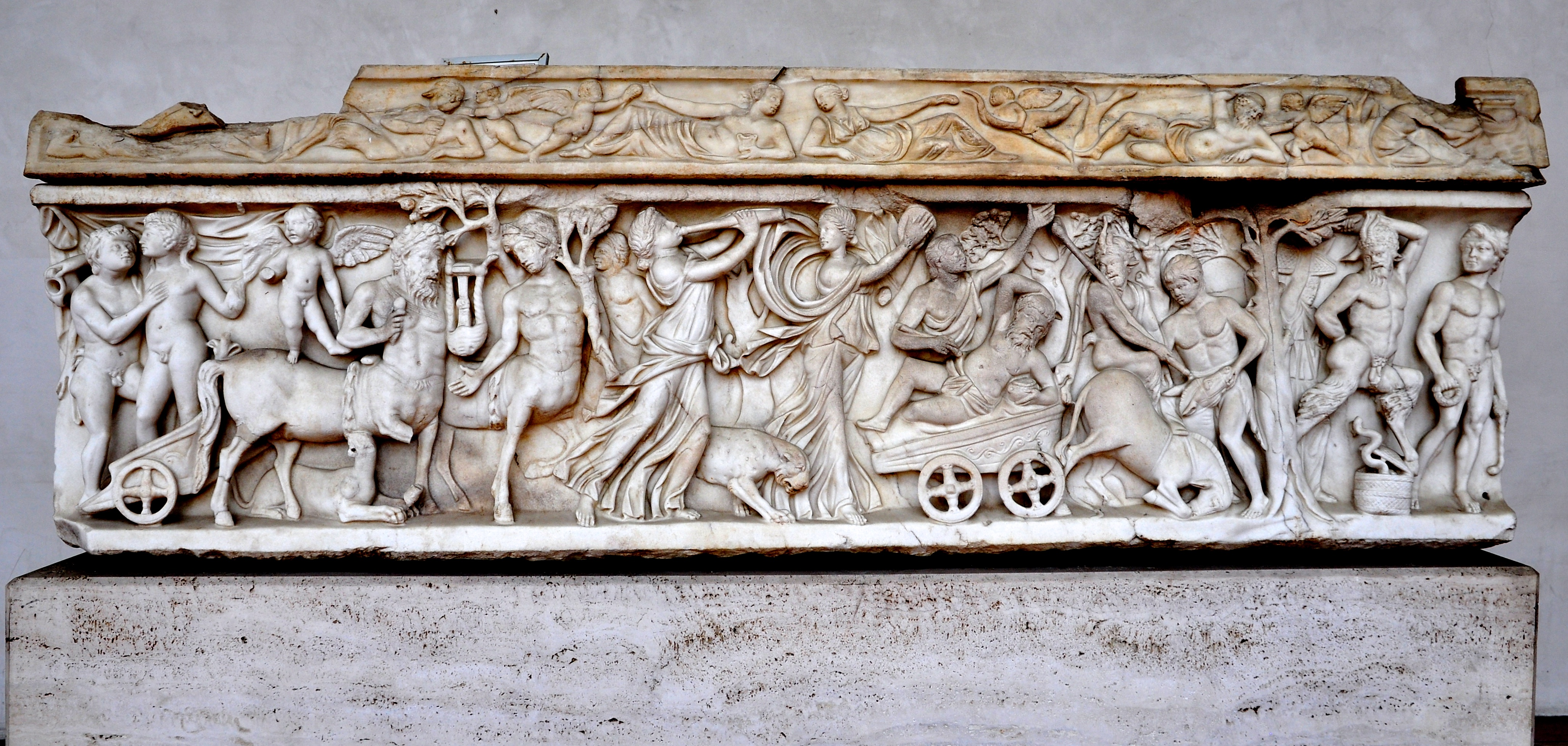
Roman sarcophagus showing a Dionysiac procession. Ca. 160–170 A.D. Baths of Diocletian, Rome

Dionysian imagery was meant to show an atmosphere of enjoyment. Often this was done by depicting him and his followers in a procession across the piece. One such example is the sarcophagi displayed in Rome's Baths of Diocletian. It depicts the servants of Dionysus—the male satyrs and the female bacchants—as they play music, drink wine, and dance. A pair of donkeys, one so intoxicated that it can no longer stand, attempts to haul an old drinking buddy of Dionysus, an old, bald, pudgy, boozy reveller named Silenus, by cart. Each of these characters has a different role to play in the minds of the viewer. Silenus represents a drunken state in which the affected almost seems like an old man; hunched over, unable to walk, often barely able to stand. The Satyrs sometimes bring a sexually frisky note to the revelry. They are often depicted attempting to seduce the female bacchants who show no interest, spurn the advances, and continue playing their music and enjoying the party.

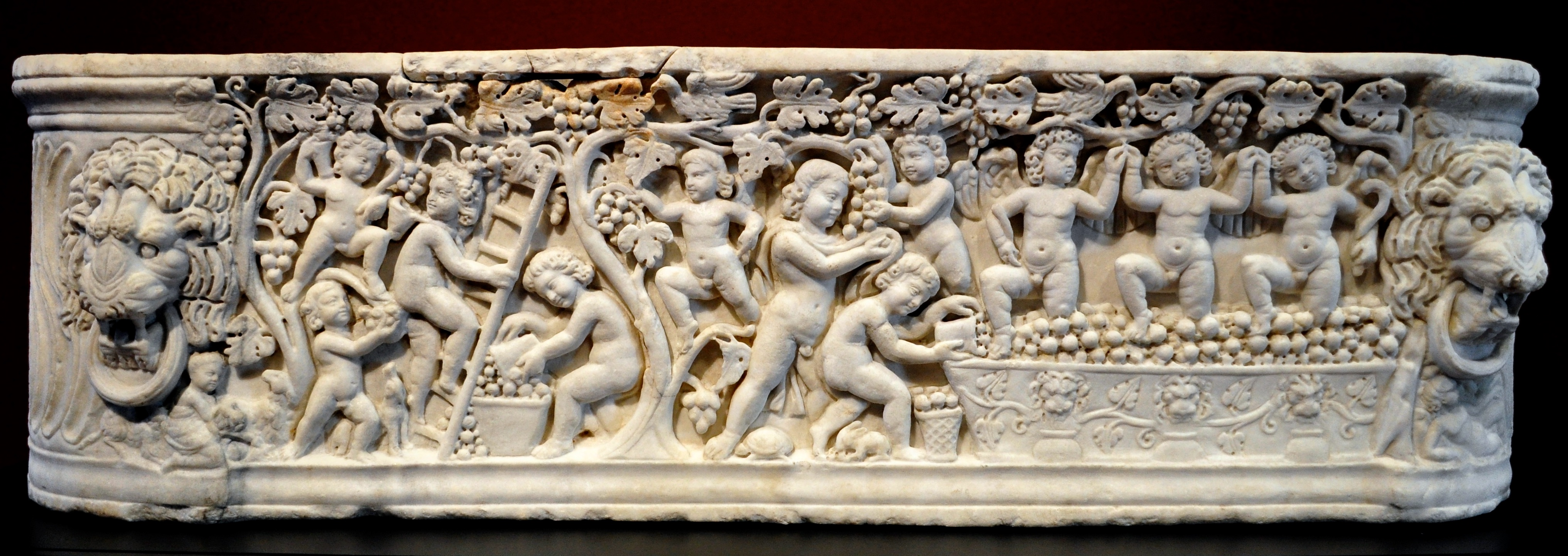
Roman lion-head lenos sarcophagus showing Cupids making wine. Ca. 290 A.D. Getty Villa, Malibu

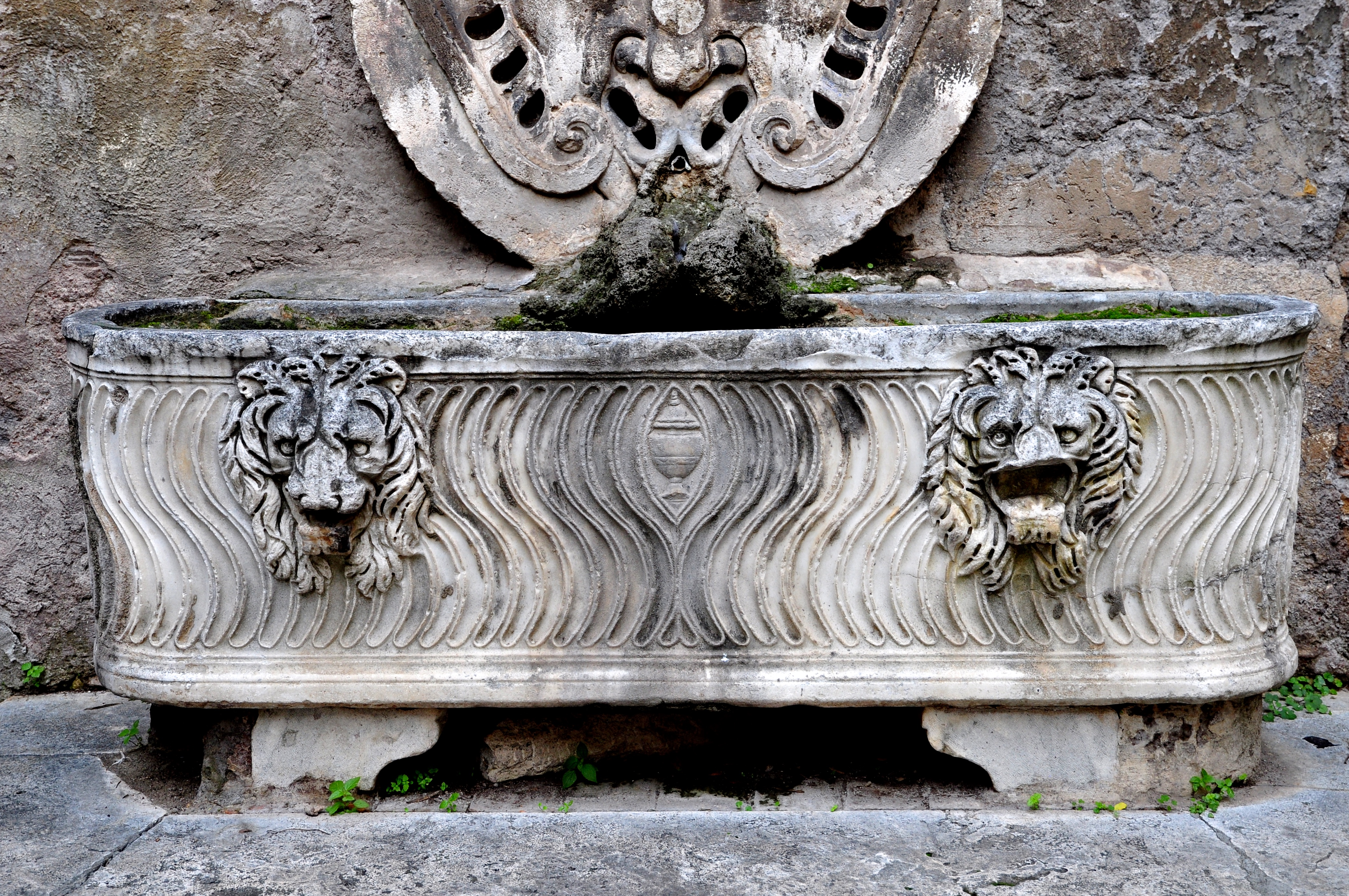
Roman strigilated lion-head lenos sarcophagus, in current use as a water basin. Ca. 260 A.D. Palazzo Mattei, Rome

Other types of Dionysian imagery include those sarcophagi, many of them lenos-shaped, which show images of grapes and the wine making process. Often cupids gathering grapes and crushing them to obtain their juices are present. One example of a lion-headed lenos sarcophagi now in the Getty Villa in Malibu, shows cupids picking grapes from the vine, as well as others who crush grapes with their feet within a lenos. Another popular format of Roman Sarcophagi are the so-called strigilated sarcophagi, whose front panels are dominated by rows of S-shaped curves, often used to evoke water or another liquid. It can be associated with wine. See, for example, the lion-headed lenos sarcophagus currently in use as a water basin in Rome's Palazzo Mattei, a use which must have been inspired by the liquid associations of the S-shaped strigillated decoration.

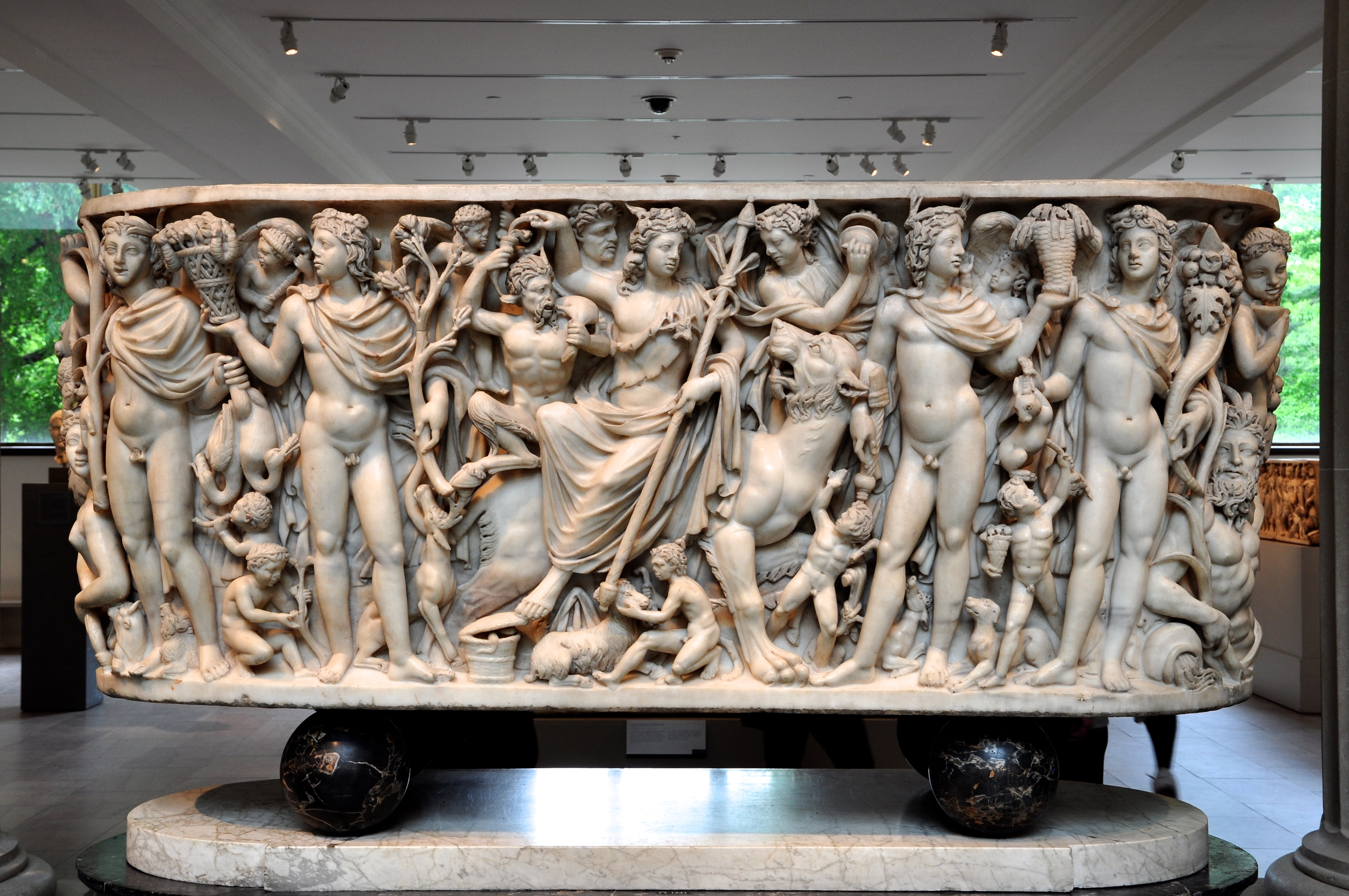
Roman sarcophagus with Dionysus on his panther, flanked by the Four Seasons (the “Badminton Sarcophagus”). Ca. 220–230 A.D. in the Metropolitan Museum, New York

Because of his association with the wilder parts of the human psyche, Dionysus is closely associated with large wild felines, especially lions (hence the common presence of lion heads on lenos sarcophagi shaped like wine vats). On Roman sarcophagi, a large feline can often be seen within the parade Dionysus is participating in, and lion heads can often be seen prominently on sarcophagi. A good example is the so-called "Badminton Sarcophagus" in New York's Metropolitan Museum, which shows in the center Dionysus riding a feline, flanked by images representing the four seasons, while his various servants fill in the background. One interesting addition is Pan, a wild deity, with the lower quarters and horns of a goat, associated with shepherding, rugged landscapes, and sexual desire having his cup filled with wine by Dionysus himself.

==== Dionysus and Ariadne ====
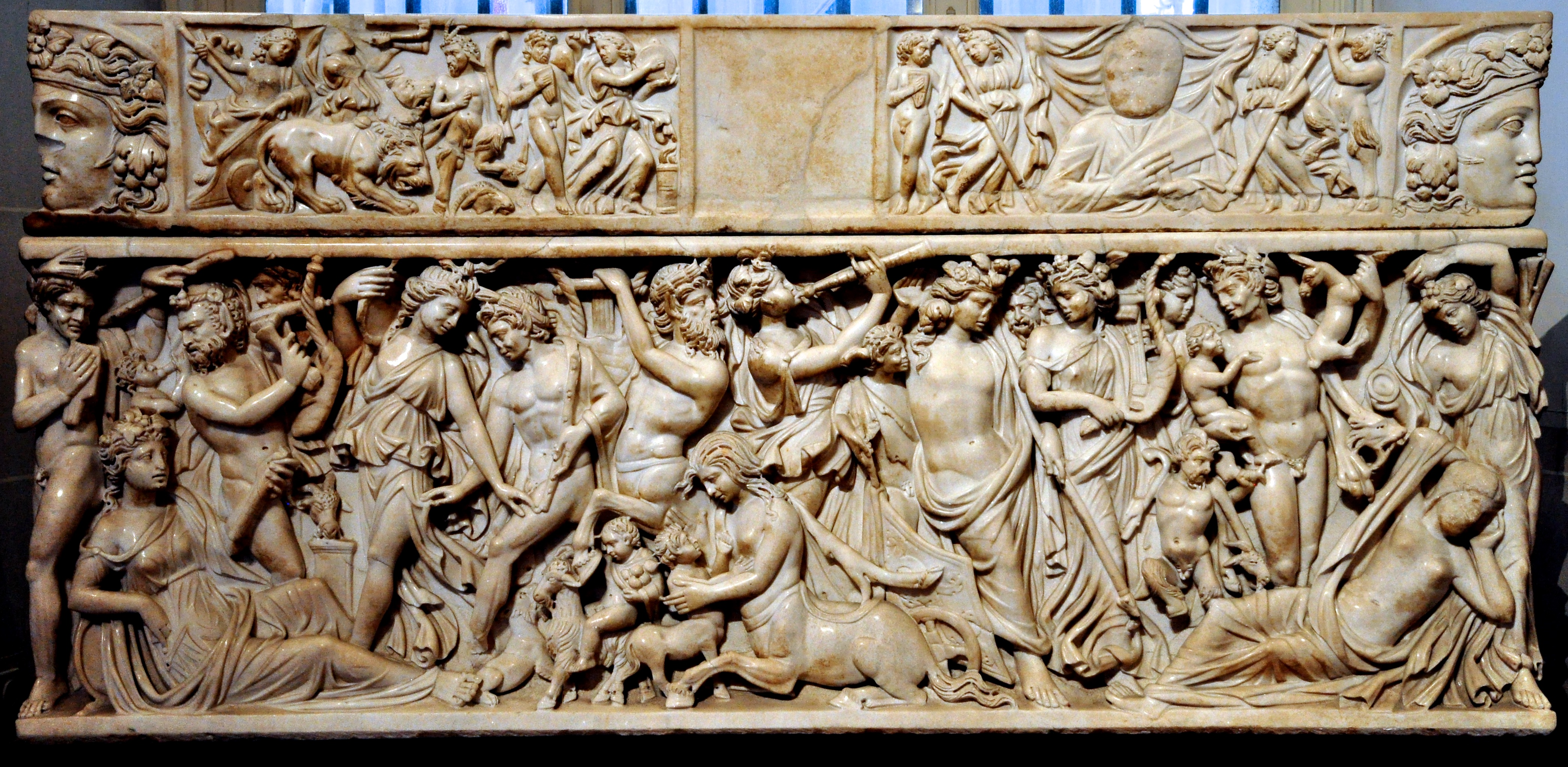
Roman sarcophagus showing Dionysus approaching Ariadne. Ca. 230–240 A.D. Louvre, Paris

One of the most detailed forms of Dionysian sarcophagi is that showing the myth of Dionysus coming across the sleeping figure of Ariadne, in Greek mythology the Cretan princess who helped Theseus slay the Minotaur, only to be marooned and abandoned by Theseus on the island of Naxos. The image consists of Ariadne, reclining in sleep, being approached by Dionysus and his procession of satyrs and Bacchants as he is enamored by her beauty. The image became popular among couples because of its ability to represent either party during the death of the other. If a man had lost his wife the image can be used to represent a man longing for his lost love, represented as peacefully dreaming in an endless sleep. If a woman has lost her husband, the image appears as a sleeping wife whose husband has come to visit her in her sleep. One marvelous example is the Dionysus and Ariadne sarcophagus shown in The Louvre, in Paris. Ariadne lies asleep, her face uncarved, meant for a portrait that was never added. Dionysus walked toward her scantily clad form with his full procession following him.

This sarcophagus also shows the slight discomfort that too-close identification with Dionysus might cause respectable Roman men. Dionysus was depicted as young, carefree, often drunken, and androgynous. All of these were characteristics that a prestigious Roman male would not want to be associated with. It would seem that Romans liked the idea of Dionysus, as well as the feelings he was known to bring, but did not want to be directly compared to him. This led to a workaround in which, like the sarcophagi presented, Dionysus stands alone with a face carved to represent the god, and a space for a portrait image was made in the upper right of the lid. This allowed for the male to still have Dionysus imagery and atmosphere connected to him after death, and still allow him a place of prestige and respect, a step removed from the god himself.

=== Seasonal and Bucolic Imagery ===
The third century A.D. saw new types of sarcophagi arise that focused on nature. These moved away from the portrayal of Greek myths that had dominated Roman sarcophagi of the preceding (second) century, preferring instead to depict the abundance and tranquility that the natural world around them had to offer. This was expressed in two different categories of Roman Sarcophagi: those that depicted the seasons; and those that depicted [bucolic] imagery. The season imagery shows the cycle of life and the cosmic order of things, while the bucolic imagery portrays an idyllic world removed from the hustle and bustle of the city.

==== Seasonal Imagery ====
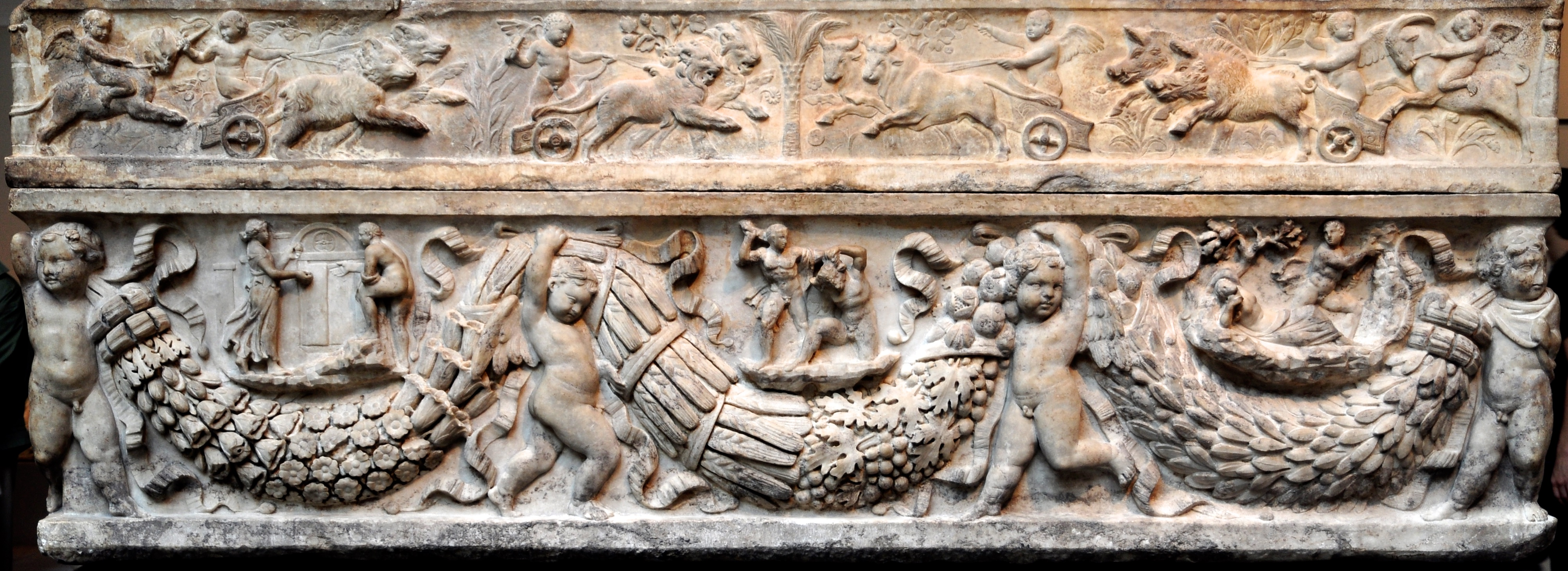
Roman sarcophagus with Cupids holding seasonal garlands; episodes from the story of Theseus & Ariadne above the swags; on the lid, Cupids race chariots. Ca. 120–150 A.D. Metropolitan Museum, New York

Representations of the seasons on Roman sarcophagi typically showed the gifts that nature had to offer people during each season, and thus also evoked associations with the cycle of nature and of life. The sarcophagus showing Cupids holding seasonal garlands in New York's Metropolitan Museum furnishes a good example. The Cupids here hold garlands composed of various flowers, fruits, and agricultural products, each associated with a different one of the four seasons: on the very left, flowers, representing spring, then sheaves of grain representing summer, then fruit (especially grapes and grape leaves) representing autumn, and then lastly olives representing winter. At the same time, the flow of the garlands, one blending into the next, represents the fluid change in the seasons themselves. What was the allure of this imagery? It reminded the viewer that nature provides in abundance, no matter the season, and by extension, proclaimed that the deceased, while alive, had enjoyed all that nature and life had to offer, in every season. It also would have served as a promise to the deceased on the part of surviving members, that they would continue to honor her or his memory year-round, in all seasons, and continue to bring the products of the various seasons into the tomb year-round as offerings to the deceased. The lid, meanwhile, shows four Cupids engaging in a chariot race. Romans would have seen the connection between chariot races and the four seasons, because the racing teams in the Roman world were divided into four factions; moreover, Roman chariot races were dedicated to the sun god, Sol (the Greek Helios), who controlled the seasons. Each chariot on the lid is pulled by an animal representing one of the seasons (the boar, for example, was associated with winter). The seasonal agricultural products on the chest thus have their animal counterparts on the lid. Finally, much like the cycle of nature and the seasons, Roman chariot races went round and round a circular (more specifically, oval) race course. The imagery on chest and lid thus complement each other perfectly.

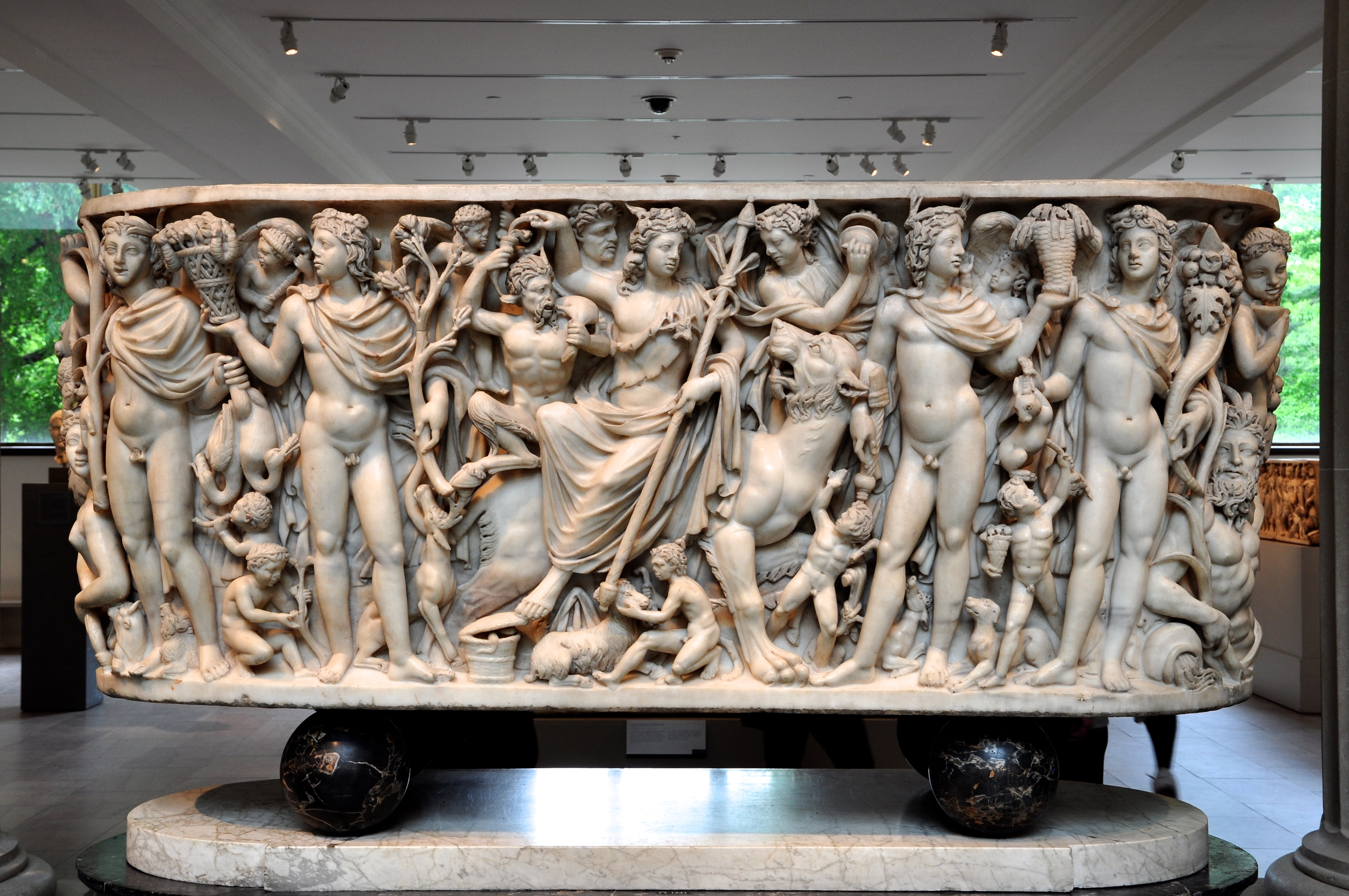
Roman sarcophagus with Dionysus on his feline, flanked by the Four Seasons (the “Badminton Sarcophagus”). Ca. 220–230 A.D. In the Metropolitan Museum, New York

The imagery of the seasons on Roman sarcophagi was often associated with the god Dionysus. This was an obvious connection, since Dionysus, as god of grapes and wine, was closely associated with the natural products of a particular season and with sharing those gifts with the world. Hence many season sarcophagi include Dionysiac elements. A good example is the so-called "Badminton Sarcophagus" in New York's Metropolitan Museum, which shows in the center Dionysus on his feline, flanked by standing personifications of the Four Seasons marked by their seasonal gifts/attributes: winter stands at the far left with a brace of ducks, with a boar at his feet; then spring, holding a basket of flowers and a budding stalk; then summer, basket of grain in hand; and finally autumn at the far right, cradling a cornucopia of grapes and grape leaves in one arm while holding a captured hare. Celebration of Dionysus's natural (particularly viticultural) gifts, along with the rest of nature's never-ending abundance, and the happiness and pleasure that they bring in eternal cycle, is clearly foregrounded on a sarcophagus such as this.

Other season sarcophagi even more strongly referenced the notion of an unshakeable ever-repeating cosmic order underlying the world. A good example is the season sarcophagus in Washington D.C.'s Dumbarton Oaks Museum. Here the standing personifications of the Four Seasons flank a central tondo/roundel (Romans called this a clipeus, the term for a round shield) which contains (unfinished) portrait busts of the deceased couple buried inside. Note that carved around the rim of the clipeus are the twelve zodiac signs. Why include these? They likely symbolize the “eternal fame and everlasting state of bliss that people wished for the deceased”. But the entire cycle of twelve zodiac signs would also have served as a visual reminder of the eternally cycling order underlying the cosmos, of which the four seasons are simply an earthly manifestation. Tranquility in the face of death, and celebration of life, was to come via contemplation of this fundamental stability in the cosmic order of things.

==== Bucolic Imagery ====
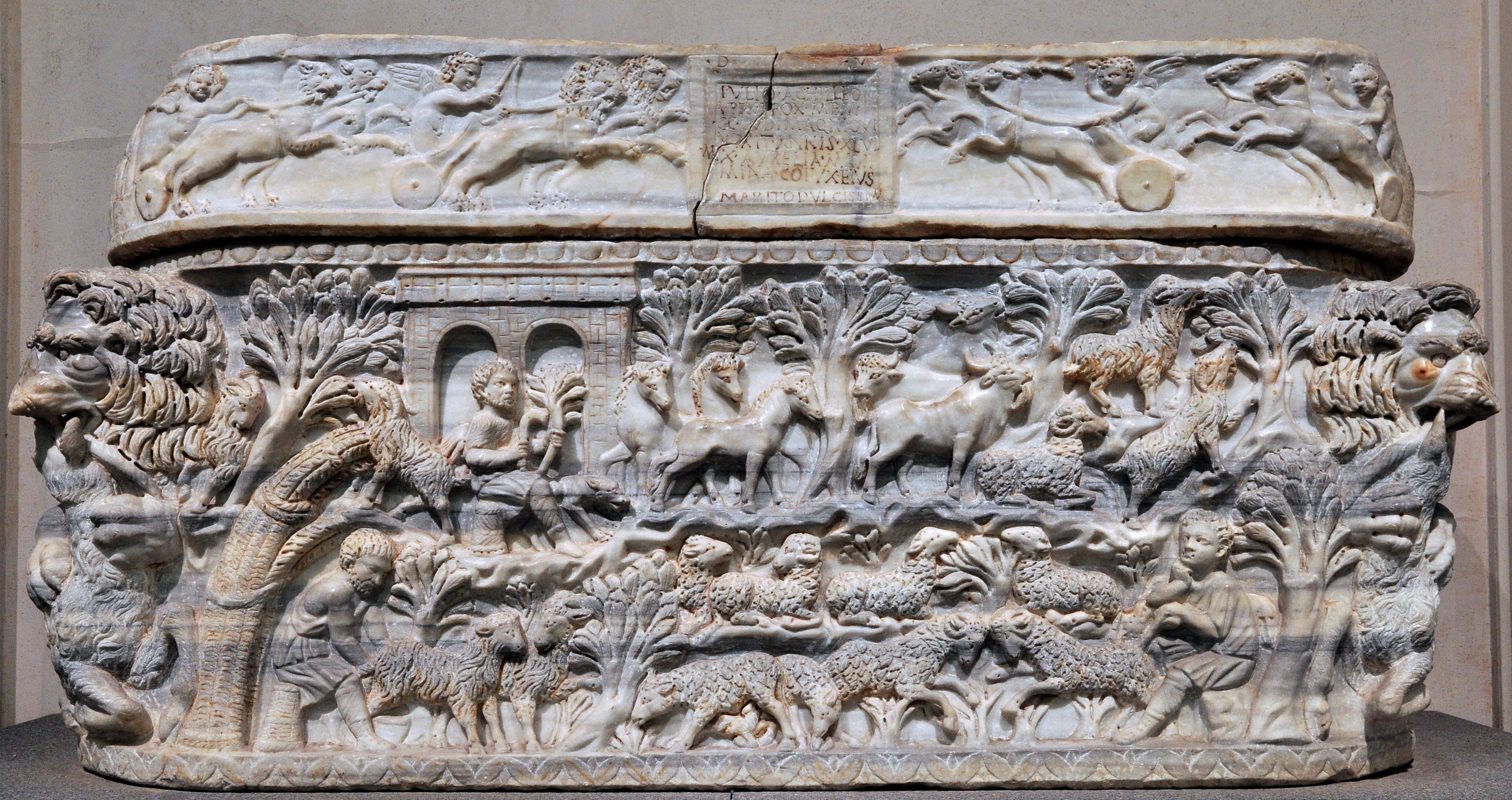
Roman lenos sarcophagus with bucolic scenes (the sarcophagus of Iulius Achilleus). Ca. 290 A.D. National Roman Museum in the Baths of Diocletian, Rome

While the seasonal imagery focuses on nature's abundance and the cosmic order that underlies it, bucolic imagery emphasizes a slightly different side to what nature might offer. Bucolic sarcophagi imagine nature as a place of escape from the strains of city life. They present an idealized vision of the 'natural state' to be enjoyed in the countryside — free from crushing crowds, free from noise, free from politics, free from social demands and social strife, in short, free from everything negative that elite Romans associated with the city — which is visually embodied on the sarcophagi through images of shepherds tending their flocks in rustic surrounds.

A gorgeous example is the sarcophagus of Iulius Achilleus (his name is inscribed on the coffin) now on display in the Baths of Diocletian in Rome. Like many other bucolic sarcophagi, this one shows the life of a shepherd as one of peace, tranquility, and prosperity, with plenty of leisure time for idle musing and soulful contemplation. The shepherds here are surrounded by their happy herds (including sheep, goats, cattle, and horses), who appear to smile as they nibble away contentedly. One shepherd is shown resting his head on a stick lost in thought, showing that they have all the time in the world to rest and reflect upon what lies ahead of them. Notice the arch behind a shepherd in the top left: this is a depiction of a city gate in the background, an explicit reminder to the viewer that the 'natural state' shown is something only found outside the city, free from its politics, burdens, and strife. Of course, such bucolic scenes never present the gritty facts of real ancient pastoral life — ceaseless tending of the flocks, baking in ferocious summer heat, freezing in winter, at the mercy of the elements and uncertain food supplies, miserable accommodations, a life of wretched poverty — but instead serve up a sanitized fantasy of rustic life designed to indulge the pampered yearnings of elite city-dwellers eager for scenes of tranquility in an imagined 'natural state'. Like the seasonal imagery just discussed, bucolic scenes too were especially popular during the second half of the third century and the early part of the fourth centuries: more than 400 sarcophagi carved between 260 and 320 A.D. have survived. They would also have a long afterlife in later Western art, as the bucolic motifs popularized on Roman sarcophagi—above all, the figure of a shepherd with a sheep slung around his shoulders—was enthusiastically adopted by early Christian art (since this image of a 'good shepherd' could be re-interpreted as an image of Christ).

== Personalization ==
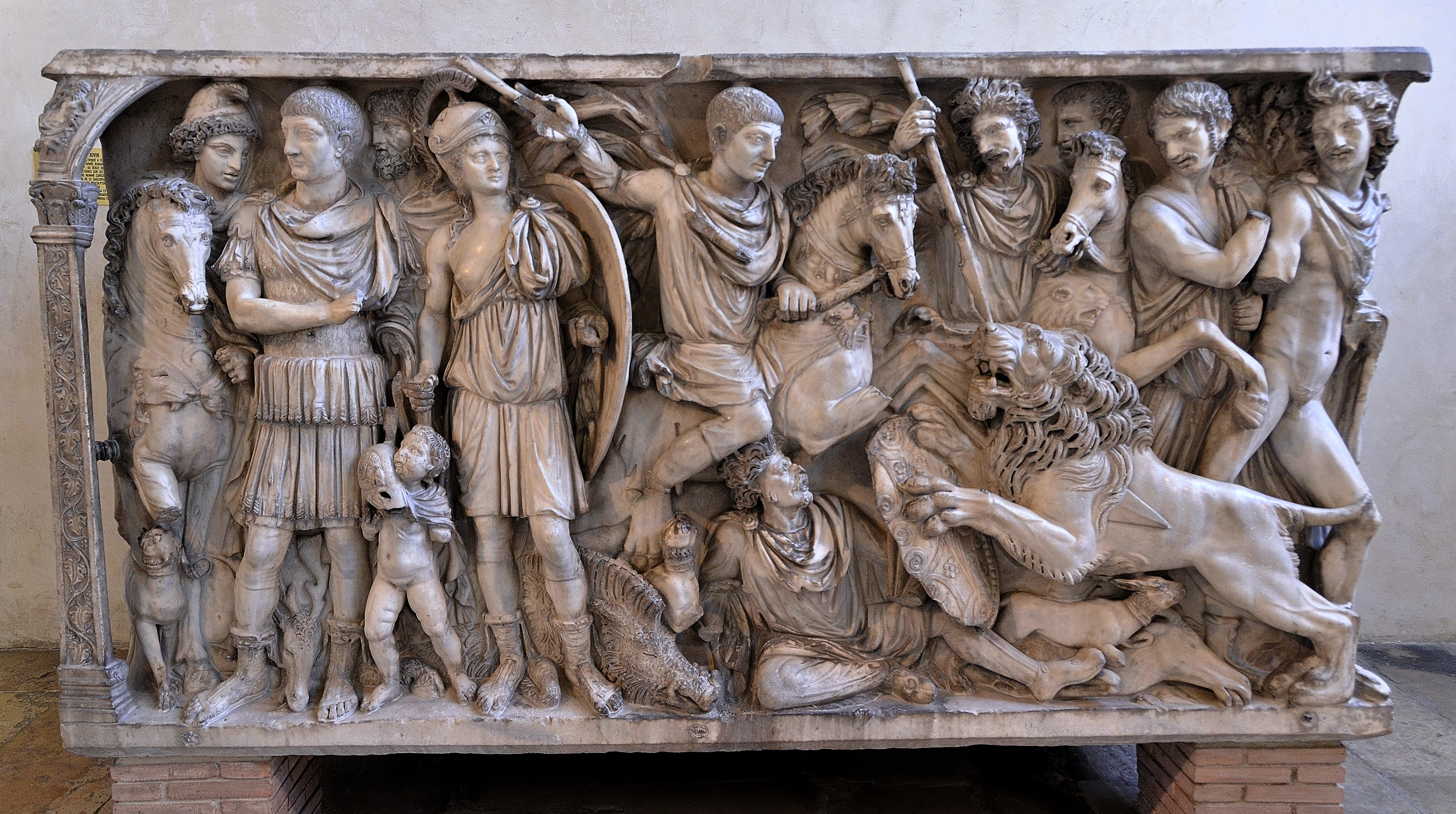
Iovinus was magister equitum from 361 to 369 under several Roman emperors, from Julian to Valentinian I. Accordingly, he had himself depicted on his richly decorated marble sarcophagus as a fighting equestrian general (centre). Musée Saint-Remi, Reims.

Sarcophagi personalization is the customization of a sarcophagus to display the attributes, achievements, or history of the deceased through art and/or inscriptions. The key way in which sarcophagi were personalized was through portraiture of a mythological character that would be carved with the facial features of the deceased. Because many sarcophagi were made in advance of being bought, several examples of unfinished portrait heads remain.

=== Sarcophagus of Lars Pulena ===
The sculpted scene on the front of the coffin shows the deceased in the Underworld between two Charuns (Etruscan death demons) in which signified that his journey to the afterlife was successful. On the lid, Pulena is shown laid across, in a reclining position, resting on his left arm and in front of him, a list of his life's achievements which were inscribed on an open scroll in Etruscan.

=== Melfi Sarcophagus ===
The Asiatic sarcophagus with kline portrait of a woman also carried an Etruscan influence of sculpting portraiture on the lid. Made of marble, with reliefs on all four sides of the box (a feature in Eastern Sarcophagi production), and sculpted mini statues of Greek deities and heroes in frames are depicted. The lid displays a portrait of the woman with Cupid (right end) and a little dog (in which the paws only remain at the left end).

=== Battle of Romans and barbarians ===
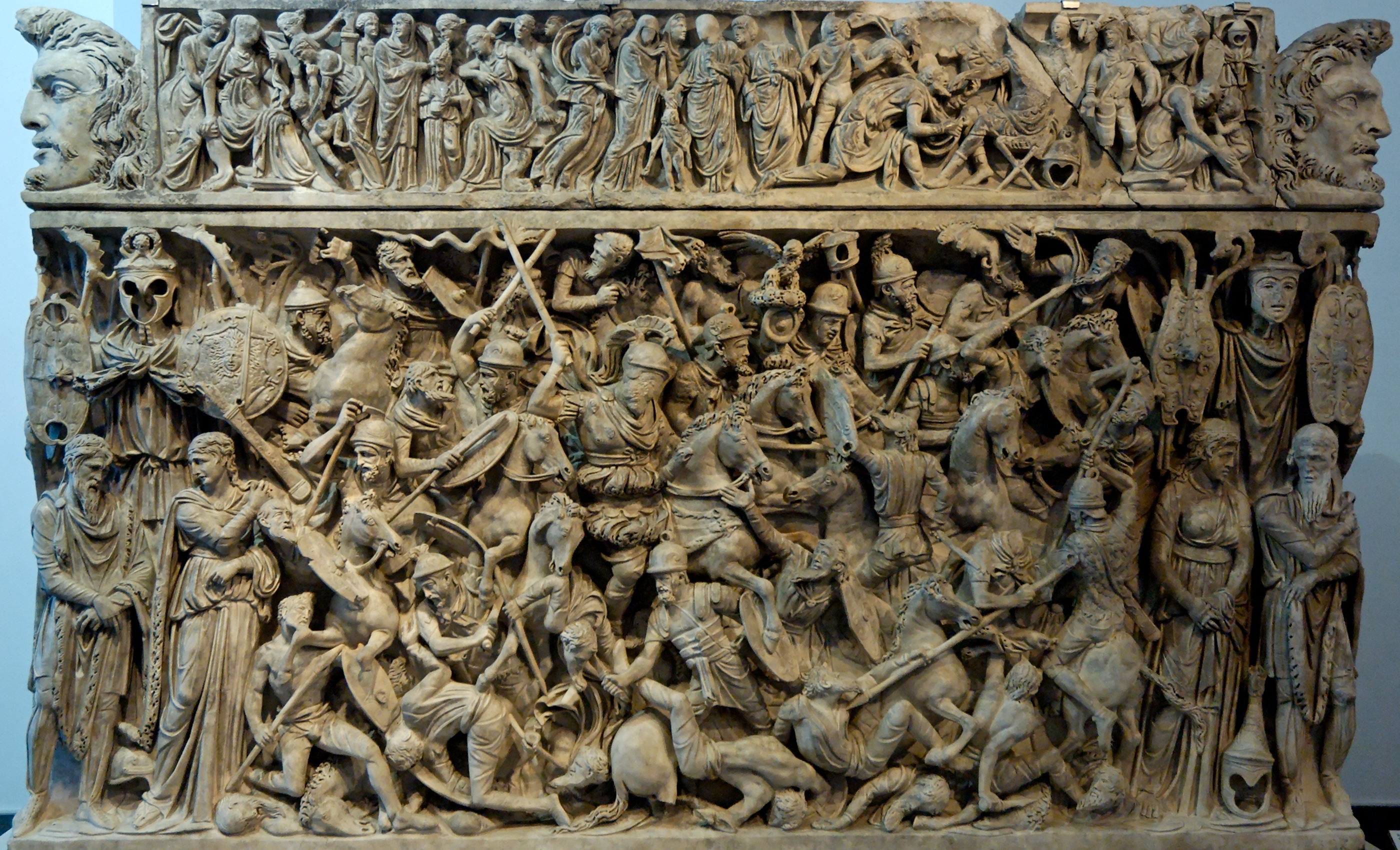
The Portonaccio sarcophagus, displaying a battle scene between Romans and Germans. Marble, Roman artwork, 180–190 C.E. Palazzo Massimo alle Terme, Rome

The Portonaccio sarcophagus is an example of one of a group of about twenty-five late Roman battle sarcophagi, with one exception all apparently dating to 170–210, made in Rome or in some cases Athens. These derive from Hellenistic monuments from Pergamon in Asia Minor showing Pergamene victories over the Gauls, and were all presumably commissioned for military commanders. The Portonaccio sarcophagus is the best known and most elaborate of the main Antonine group, and shows both considerable similarities to the Great Ludovisi sarcophagus, the late outlier from about 250, and a considerable contrast in style and mood.

The face of the general is unfinished, either because the sculptors awaited a model to work from, or they had produced the work speculatively with no specific commission. The general and his wife are also each shown twice on the lid frieze, together holding each other's hands at the centre, and singly at the ends, again with unfinished faces.

The unusually large Ludovisi Battle sarcophagus shows a chaotic battle scene between the Romans and barbarian foes. At the centre, a young general wears no helmet nor wields any weapon and has emblem of Mithras, the Persian god of light, truth, and victory over death carved into his forehead. Several scholars have identified him as one of the sons of Trajan Decius, who died of plague.

=== Santa Maria Antiqua Sarcophagus ===
A sarcophagus from the church of Santa Maria Antiqua with philosopher, orant, and Old and New Testament scenes is Early Christian art in which displays the story of Jonah on the left one-third, heads of a praying woman and a seated man reading from a scroll which are unfinished (intended to be portraits of the deceased) in the center, and continuing on, Christ as Good Shepherd, and the baptism of Christ.
