= Friedrich Loofs =

German theologian and historian (1858–1928)

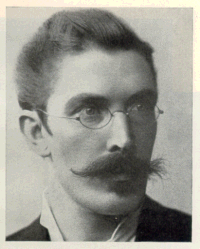
- Born: 19 June 1858; Hildesheim
- Died: 13 January 1928 (aged 69); Halle an der Saale
- Occupation(s): Theologian, writer

Friedrich Loofs (19 June 1858 in Hildesheim – 13 January 1928 in Halle an der Saale) was a German theologian and church historian best remembered for his studies involving the history of dogma.

== Biography ==
Loofs studied theology at the universities of Leipzig, Tübingen, and Göttingen, and received his doctorate from Leipzig in 1881. As a student, Adolf von Harnack (Leipzig) and Albrecht Ritschl (Göttingen) were important influences to his career. From 1888 to 1926 he was a professor of church history at the University of Halle, where in 1907/08 he served as rector. Concurrent with his work at the university, from 1890 to 1925, he held title of Consistorialrat in the city of Magdeburg.

In 1886, he was co-founder of the journal Die Christliche Welt ("The Christian World").

Loofs was an opponent of the Christ myth theory. In his book What is the Truth about Jesus Christ? (1913) he criticized the theories of mythicists such as Arthur Drews and William Benjamin Smith.

He attacked the views of Ernst Haeckel which he considered anti-Christian.

== Selected works ==
- Leontius von Byzanz und die gleichnamigen Schriftsteller der griechischen Kirche, 1887 – Leontius of Byzantium and the writer of the same name from the Greek Church.
- Leitfaden zum Studium der Dogmengeschichte, 1890 – Guide to studying the history of dogma.
- Anti-Haeckel : eine Replik nebst Beilagen, 1900 – Anti-Haeckel: a replica with supplements.
- Grundlinien der Kirchengeschichte : in der Form von Dispositionen für seine Vorlesungen, 1901 – Elements of the Church's history in the form of disposition of lectures.
- Lessings Stellung zum Christentum, 1910 – Gotthold Ephraim Lessing's position on Christianity.
- What is the Truth about Jesus Christ?, New York: Charles Scribner's Sons, 1913.
- Loofs, Friedrich (1914). Nestorius and his Place in the History of Christian Doctrine. Cambridge: Cambridge University Press. ISBN 9781107450769.
- Paulus von Samosata, eine Untersuchung zur altkirchlichen Literatur- und Dogmengeschichte, 1924 – Paul of Samosata, a study of Early Christian church literature and history of dogma.
