= Carl Robert =

German classical philologist and archaeologist

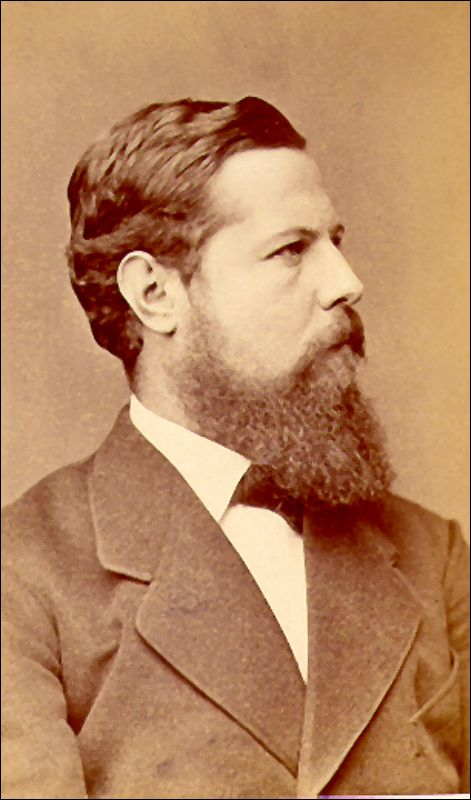
- Born: 8 March 1850; Marburg, Grand Duchy of Hesse
- Died: 17 January 1922 (aged 71); Halle, Germany

Academic background
- Education: University of Bonn; University of Berlin

Academic work
- Discipline: Classical philology
- Institutions: University of Halle; Humboldt University of Berlin

Carl (Karl) Georg Ludwig Theodor Herwig Joseph Robert (8 March 1850 – 17 January 1922) was a German classical philologist and archaeologist.

He began his studies of ancient philology and archaeology at the University of Bonn, where he was a student of Otto Jahn, Reinhard Stradonitz, and Anton Springer. In 1870, he began service as a volunteer in the Hessian Infantry Battalion No. 11 during the Franco-Prussian War. Afterwards, he resumed his studies at the University of Berlin under Theodor Mommsen, Adolf Kirchhoff and Ulrich von Wilamowitz-Moellendorff. In 1873, he obtained his doctorate in Berlin with the thesis De Apollodori bibliotheca. From a travel grant by the German Archaeological Institute, he conducted scientific research in Greece and Italy.

In 1877, he became an associate professor at Berlin, attaining a full professorship in 1880. In 1890, he was appointed chair of classical archaeology and philology at the University of Halle. At Halle, he served as director of its archaeological museum, of which, he made important improvements via new acquisitions. In the 1920s, the museum was renamed the "Robertinum" in honor of his accomplishments.

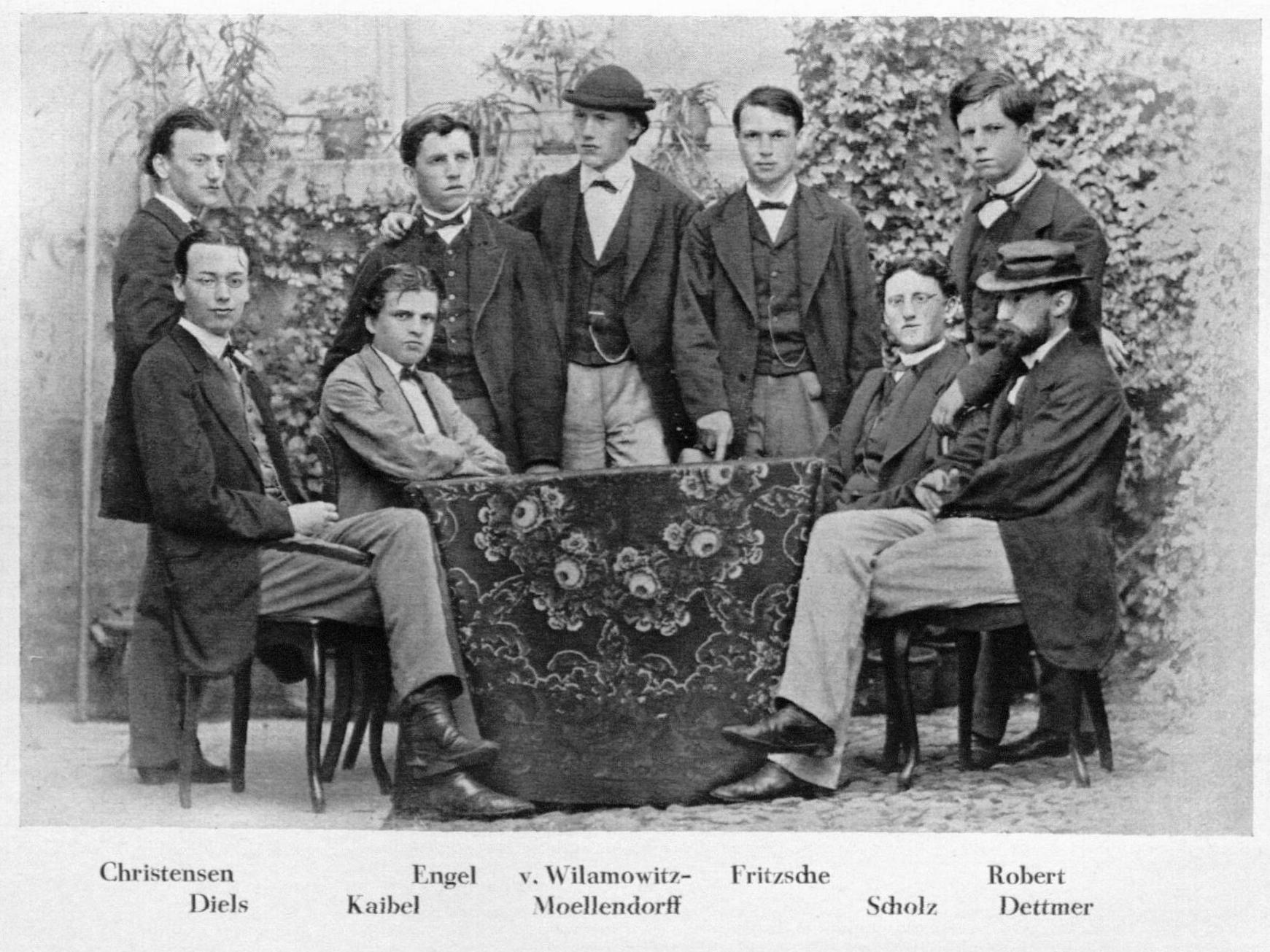
Members of the Bonn Philological Society, 1869; Carl Robert is standing at the far right.

== Written works ==
As a classical scholar, he preferred a close association between the disciplines of archaeology and philology, while downplaying the art historical approach. For many years, he was editor of the journal Hermes, and was the author of a highly regarded revision of Ludwig Preller's Griechische Mythologie. He also made contributions to the corpus of ancient sarcophagus reliefs, Die antiken Sarkophag-Reliefs (volumes 2 & 3). The following are a few of his other significant works:

- Bild und Lied : Archäologische Beiträge zur Geschichte der griechischen Heldensage, 1881.
- Studien zur Ilias, 1901.
- Archaeologische Hermeneutik : Anleitung zur Deutung klassischer Bildwerke, 1919.
