= Erich Haupt =

German Lutheran theologian (1841–1910)

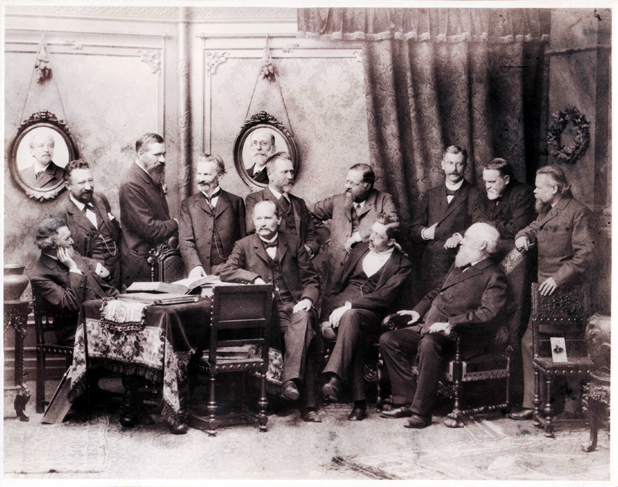
"Spirituskreis" (1902); Erish Haupt sitting first on left

Karl Friedrich Erich Haupt (8 July 1841 – 19 February 1910) was a German Lutheran theologian.

== Biography ==
He was born at Stralsund, and educated at Berlin. He later worked as a schoolteacher in Kolberg and Treptow an der Rega. He was a professor of New Testament exegesis, successively at Kiel (from 1878), Greifswald (from 1883), and Halle (from 1888), where in 1902 he was named university rector.

He was successor to Willibald Beyschlag as chairman of the main association of the Gustav-Adolf-Stiftung, and from 1901 to 1908 was editor of the "Deutsch-evangelischen Blätter". For a period of time, he served as head of the Evangelischen Bundes (Protestant Federation).

== Works ==
- Der erste Brief des Johannes (“First Epistle of John”; 1869).
- Die alttestamentlichen Citate in den vier Evangelien (“Citations of the Old Testament in the four gospels"; 1871).
- Die Kirche und die theologische Lehrfreiheit (“The church and freedom of theological teaching”; 1881).
- Plus ultra, zur Universitätsfrage (2nd ed., 1890).
- Die Bedeutung der heiligen Schrift für den evangelischen Christen (“The meaning of the Holy Scripture for Lutherans”; 1891).
- Zum Verständnis des Apostolats im Neuen Testament ("To the understanding of the Apostolates in the New Testament"; 1896).
