= Turoyo language =

Central Neo-Aramaic language

Turoyo
- Surayt; Suryoyo
- ܣܘܪܝܬ (Surayt) ܛܘܪܝܐ (Turoyo)
- Surayt written in West Syriac "Serṭā" script
- Pronunciation: [tˤuˈrɔjɔ]
- Native to: Turkey, Syria
- Region: Mardin Province of southeastern Turkey; Al-Hasakah Governorate in northeastern Syria
- Ethnicity: Assyrians
- Native speakers: 100,000 (2019–2023)
- Language family: Afro-Asiatic: Semitic; Central Semitic; Northwest Semitic; Aramaic; Eastern Aramaic; Central Neo-Aramaic; Turoyo
- Writing system: Syriac alphabet (West Syriac Serṭo); Latin alphabet (Turoyo alphabet)

Official status
- Recognised minority language in: Autonomous Administration of North and East Syria (Note: The right to get an education in one's native tongue has been established as a legal guarantee.); Turkey

Language codes
- ISO 639-3: tru
- Glottolog: turo1239
- ELP: Turoyo
- Surayt is classified as Severely Endangered by the UNESCO Atlas of the World's Languages in Danger (2010)

Turoyo (Turoyo: ܛܘܪܝܐ), also referred to as Surayt (Turoyo: ܣܘܪܝܬ), or modern Suryoyo (Turoyo: ܣܘܪܝܝܐ), is a Central Neo-Aramaic language traditionally spoken by the Syriac Christian community in the Tur Abdin region located in southeastern Turkey and in northeastern Syria. Turoyo speakers are mostly adherents of the Syriac Orthodox Church. Originally spoken and exclusive to Tur Abdin, it is now majority spoken in the diaspora. It is classified as a vulnerable language. Most speakers use the Classical Syriac language for literature and worship. Its closest relatives are Mlaḥsô and western varieties of Northeastern Neo-Aramaic like Suret. Turoyo is not mutually intelligible with Western Neo-Aramaic, having been separated for over a thousand years.

== Etymology ==
Term Ṭuroyo comes from the word ṭuro, meaning 'mountain', thus designating a specific Neo-Aramaic language of the mountain region of Tur Abdin in southeastern part of modern Turkey (hence Turabdinian Aramaic). Other, more general names for the language are Surayt or Suryoyo.

The term Surayt is commonly used by its speakers, as a general designation for their language, modern or historical. It is also used by the recent EU funded programme to revitalize the language, in preference to Ṭuroyo, since Surayt is a historical name for the language used by its speakers, while Turoyo is a more academic name for the language used to distinguish it from other Neo-Aramaic languages, and Classical Syriac. However, especially in the diaspora, the language is frequently called Surayt, Suryoyo (or Surayt, Sŭryoyo or Süryoyo depending on dialect), meaning "Syriac" in general. Since it has developed as one of western variants of the Syriac language, Turoyo is sometimes also referred to as Western Neo-Syriac.

== History ==
Turoyo has evolved from the Eastern Aramaic colloquial varieties that have been spoken in Tur Abdin and the surrounding plain for more than a thousand years since the initial introduction of Aramaic to the region. However, it has also been influenced by Classical Syriac, which itself was the variety of the Eastern Middle Aramaic spoken farther west, in the city of Edessa, today known as Urfa. Due to the proximity of Tur Abdin to Edessa, and the closeness of their parent languages, meant that Turoyo bears a greater similarity to Classical Syriac than do Northeastern Neo-Aramaic varieties.

The homeland of Turoyo is the Tur Abdin region in southeastern Turkey. This region is a traditional stronghold of Syriac Orthodox Christians. The Turoyo-speaking population prior to the Sayfo largely adhered to the Syriac Orthodox Church. In 1970, it was estimated that there were 20,000 Turoyo-speakers still living in the area, however, they gradually migrated to Western Europe and elsewhere in the world. The Turoyo-speaking diaspora is now estimated at 100,000. In the diaspora communities, Turoyo is usually a second language which is supplemented by more mainstream languages. The language is considered endangered by UNESCO, but efforts are still made by Turoyo-speaking communities to sustain the language through use in homelife, school programs to teach Turoyo on the weekends, and summer day camps.

Until recently, Turoyo was a spoken vernacular and was never written down: Kthobonoyo (Classical Syriac) was the written language. In the 1880s, various attempts were made, with the encouragement of western missionaries, to write Turoyo in the Syriac alphabet, in the Serto and in Estrangelo script used for West-Syriac Kthobhonoyo. One of the first comprehensive studies of the language was published in 1881, by orientalists Eugen Prym and Albert Socin, who classified it as a Neo-Aramaic dialect.

However, with upheaval in their homeland through the twentieth century, many Turoyo speakers have emigrated around the world (particularly to Syria, Lebanon, Sweden and Germany). The Swedish government's education policy, that every child be educated in his or her first language, led to the commissioning of teaching materials in Turoyo. Yusuf Ishaq thus developed an alphabet for Turoyo based on the Latin script. Silas Üzel also created a separate Latin alphabet for Turoyo in Germany.

A series of reading books and workbooks that introduce Ishaq's alphabet are called Toxu Qorena!, or "Come, Let's Read!" This project has also produced a Swedish-Turoyo dictionary of 4500 entries: the Svensk-turabdinskt Lexikon: Leksiqon Swedoyo-Suryoyo. Another old teacher, writer and translator of Turoyo is Yuhanun Üzel (1934-2023) who in 2009 finished the translation of the Peshitta Bible in Turoyo, with Benjamin Bar Shabo and Yakup Bilgic, in Serto (West-Syriac) and Latin script, a foundation for the "Aramaic-Syriac language". A team of AI researchers completed the first translation model for Turoyo in 2023.

== Dialects ==
Turoyo has borrowed some words from Arabic, Kurdish, Armenian, and Ottoman Turkish. The main dialect of Turoyo is that of Midyat (Mëḏyoyo), in the east of Turkey's Mardin Province. Every village have distinctive dialects (Midwoyo, Kfarzoyo, `Iwarnoyo, Nihloyo, and Izloyo, respectively). All Turoyo dialects are mutually intelligible with each other. There is a dialectal split between the town of Midyat and the villages, with only slight differences between the individual villages. A closely related language or dialect, Mlaḥsô, spoken in two villages in Diyarbakır, is now deemed extinct.

== Alphabet ==
Turoyo is written both in Latin and Syriac (Serto) characters. The orthography below was the outcome of the International Surayt Conference held at the University of Cambridge (27–30 August 2015).

Consonants
Latin letter	'	B b	V v	G g	Ġ ġ	J j	D d	Ḏ ḏ	H h	W w	Z z	Ž ž	Ḥ ḥ	Ṭ ṭ	Ḍ ḍ	Y y
Syriac letter	ܐ	ܒ	ܒ݂	ܓ	ܓ݂	ܔ	ܕ	ܕ݂	ܗ	ܘ	ܙ	ܙ݅	ܚ	ܛ	ܜ	ܝ
Pronunciation	[ʔ], ∅	[b]	[v]	[g]	[ɣ]	[dʒ]	[d]	[ð]	[h]	[w]	[z]	[ʒ]	[ħ]	[tˤ]	[dˤ]	[j]
Latin letter	K k	X x	L l	M m	N n	S s	C c	P p	F f	Ṣ ṣ	Q q	R r	Š š	Č č	T t	Ṯ ṯ
Syriac letter	ܟ	ܟ݂	ܠ	ܡ	ܢ	ܣ	ܥ	ܦ	ܦ݂	ܨ	ܩ	ܪ	ܫ	ܫ݂	ܬ	ܬ݂
Pronunciation	[k]	[x]	[l]	[m]	[n]	[s]	[ʕ]	[p]	[f]	[sˤ]	[q]	[r]	[ʃ]	[tʃ]	[t]	[θ]

Vowels
Latin letter	A a	Ä ä	E e	Ë ë	O o	Y/I y/i	W/U w/u
Syriac vowel mark (or mater lectionis)	ܰ	ܱ	ܶ	ܷ	ܳ	ܝ	ܘ
Pronunciation	[a]	[ă]	[e]	[ə]	[o]	[j]/[i]	[w]/[u]

Attempts to write down Turoyo have begun since the 16th century, with Jewish Neo-Aramaic adaptions and translations of Biblical texts, commentaries, as well as hagiographic stories, books, and folktales in Christian dialects. The East Syriac Bishop Mar Yohannan working with American missionary Rev. Justin Perkins also tried to write the vernacular version of religious texts, culminating in the production of school-cards in 1836.

In 1970s Germany, members of the Aramean evangelical movement (Aramäische Freie Christengemeinde) used Turoyo to write short texts and songs. The Syriac evangelical movement has also published over 300 Turoyo hymns in a compedium named Kole Ruhonoye in 2012, as well as translating the four gospels with Mark and John being published so far.

In the 1970s, educator Yusuf Ishaq attempted to systematically incorporate the Turoyo language into a Latin orthography, which resulted in a series of reading books, entitled [toxu qorena]. Although this system is not used outside of Sweden, other Turoyo speakers have developed their own non-standardized Latin script to use the language on digital platforms.

The Swedish government's "mother-tongue education" project treated Turoyo as an immigrant language, like Arabic, Turkish, Kurdish, and began to teach the language in schools. The staff of the National Swedish Institute for Teaching Material produced a Latin letter-based alphabet, grammar, dictionary, school books, and instructional material. Due to religious and political objections, the project was halted.

There are other efforts to translate famous works of literature, including The Aramaic Students Association's translation of The Little Prince, the Nisbin Foundation's translation of Cinderella and Little Red Riding Hood.

Iliana speaking Turoyo language

== Phonology ==
Phonetically, Turoyo is very similar to Classical Syriac. The additional phonemes /d͡ʒ/ (as in judge), /t͡ʃ/ (as in church) /ʒ/ (as in azure) and a few instances of /ðˤ/ (the Arabic ẓāʾ) mostly only appear in loanwords from other languages.

The most distinctive feature of Turoyo phonology is its use of reduced vowels in closed syllables. The phonetic value of such reduced vowels differs depending both on the value of original vowel and the dialect spoken. The Miḏyoyo dialect also reduces vowels in pre-stress open syllables. That has the effect of producing a syllabic schwa in most dialects (in Classical Syriac, the schwa is not syllabic).

=== Consonants ===
	Labial		Dental/Alveolar						Palato- alveolar		Palatal	Velar		Uvular	Pharyn- geal		Glottal
	Labial		plain				emphatic		Palato- alveolar		Palatal	Velar		Uvular	Pharyn- geal		Glottal
Nasal		m			n			(nˤ)									
Plosive	p	b	t		d		tˤ	dˤ				k	ɡ	q			ʔ
Affricate									tʃ	dʒ							
Fricative	f	v	θ	ð	s	z	sˤ	ðˤ	ʃ	ʒ		x	ɣ		ħ	ʕ	h
Approximant		w			l			(lˤ)			j						
Trill					r			(rˤ)									

=== Vowels ===
Turoyo has the following set of vowels:

	Front	Central	Back
Close	i		u
Mid	e		o
Open		a	

Lax vowels
	Central	Back
Close		ŭ
Mid	ə	
Open	ă	

== Morphology ==
The verbal system of Turoyo is similar to that used in other Neo-Aramaic languages. In Classical Syriac, the ancient perfect and imperfect tenses had started to become preterite and future tenses respectively, and other tenses were formed by using the participles with pronominal clitics or shortened forms of the verb hwā ('to become'). Most modern Aramaic languages have completely abandoned the old tenses and form all tenses from stems based around the old participles. The classical clitics have become incorporated fully into the verb form, and can be considered more like inflections.

Turoyo has also developed the use of the demonstrative pronouns much more than any other Aramaic language. In Turoyo, they have become definite articles:

- masculine singular: u malko (the king)
- feminine singular: i malëkṯo (the queen)
- plural common: am malke (the kings), am malkoṯe (the queens).

The other Central Neo-Aramaic dialect, of Mlahsô and Ansha villages in Diyarbakır Province is somewhat different from Turoyo. It is virtually extinct; its last few speakers live in Qamishli in northeastern Syria and in the diaspora.

== Syntax ==
Turoyo has three sets of particles that take the place of the copula in nominal clauses: enclitic copula, independent copula, and emphatic independent copula. In Turoyo, the non-enclitic copula (or the existential particle) is articulated with the use of two sets of particles: kal and kit.

Red markers represent Christian Neo-Aramaic varieties while blue represents Jewish ones and purple represents both spoken in the same town.

== See also ==
- Aramaic language
- Neo-Aramaic languages
- Central Neo-Aramaic languages
- Aramaic studies
- Bible translations into Aramaic
- Bible translations into Syriac
- Syriac language
- Syriac alphabet
- Syriac literature
- Syriac studies
- Syriac Christianity
- Romanization of Syriac

== Bibliography ==
=== Books ===
- Barsoum, Ignatius Aphram (2008). The History of Tur Abdin. Piscataway, NJ: Gorgias Press. ISBN 9781593337155.
- Beyer, Klaus (1986). The Aramaic Language: Its Distribution and Subdivisions. Göttingen: Vandenhoeck und Ruprecht. ISBN 9783525535738.
- Jastrow, Otto (1993) [1967]. Laut- und Formenlehre des neuaramäischen Dialekts von Mīdin im Ṭūr ʻAbdīn. Wiesbaden: Harrassowitz Verlag. ISBN 9783447033343.
- Jastrow, Otto (2002) [1992]. Lehrbuch der Ṭuroyo-Sprache. Wiesbaden: Harrassowitz Verlag. ISBN 9783447032131.
- Palmer, Andrew (1990). Monk and Mason on the Tigris Frontier: The Early History of Ṭur 'Abdin. Cambridge: Cambridge University Press. ISBN 9780521360265.
- Prym, Eugen; Socin, Albert (1881). Der neu-aramaeische Dialekt des Ṭûr 'Abdîn. Göttingen: Vandenhoeck & Ruprecht's Verlag.
- Talay, Shabo, ed. (2017). Šlomo Surayt: An Introductory Course in Surayt Aramaic (Turoyo). Glane: Bar Hebraeus Verlag. ISBN 9789050470667.
- Tezel, Aziz (2003). Comparative Etymological Studies in the Western Neo-Syriac (Ṭūrōyo) Lexicon: With Special Reference to Homonyms, Related Words and Borrowings with Cultural Signification. Uppsala: Uppsala University Library. ISBN 9789155455552.
- Tezel, Sina (2011). Arabic Borrowings in Ṣūrayt/Ṭūrōyo within the Framework of Phonological Correspondences in Comparison with Other Semitic Languages. Uppsala: Uppsala Universitet. ISBN 9789155480585.
- Waltisberg, Michael (2016). Syntax des Ṭuroyo. Wiesbaden: Harrassowitz Verlag. ISBN 9783447107310.

=== Book chapters ===
- Bednarowicz, Sebastian (2018). "Neues Alphabet, neue Sprache, neue Kultur: Was kann die Adaptation der lateinischen Schrift für das Turoyo implizieren?". Neue Aramäische Studien: Geschichte und Gegenwart. Frankfurt am Main: Peter Lang. pp. 203–214. ISBN 9783631731314.
- Bilgic, Zeki (2018). "Aramäisch des Tur Abdin schreiben und lesen: Überlegungen, warum die Sprechergemeinschaft des Tur Abdin das Neu-Aramäische nicht als Schriftsprache anerkennt". Neue Aramäische Studien: Geschichte und Gegenwart. Frankfurt am Main: Peter Lang. pp. 215–250. ISBN 9783631731314.
- Birol, Simon (2018). "Forgotten Witnesses: Remembering and Interpreting the Sayfo in the Manuscripts of Tur 'Abdin". Sayfo 1915: An Anthology of Essays on the Genocide of Assyrians/Arameans during the First World War. Piscataway, NJ: Gorgias Press. pp. 327–346. ISBN 9781463207304.
- Borbone, Pier Giorgio (2017). "From Tur 'Abdin to Rome: The Syro-Orthodox Presence in Sixteenth-Century Rome". Syriac in its Multi-Cultural Context. Leuven: Peeters Publishers. pp. 277–287. ISBN 9789042931640.
- Heinrichs, Wolfhart (1990). "Written Turoyo". Studies in Neo-Aramaic. Atlanta: Scholars Press. pp. 181–188. ISBN 9781555404307.
- Ishaq, Yusuf M. (1990). "Turoyo – from Spoken to Written Language". Studies in Neo-Aramaic. Atlanta: Scholars Press. pp. 189–199. ISBN 9781555404307.
- Jastrow, Otto (1990). "Personal and Demonstrative Pronouns in Central Neo-Aramaic: A Comparative and Diachronic Discussion Based on Ṭūrōyo and the Eastern Neo-Aramaic Dialect of Hertevin". Studies in Neo-Aramaic. Atlanta: Scholars Press. pp. 89–103. ISBN 9781555404307.
- Jastrow, Otto (2011). "Ṭuroyo and Mlaḥsô". The Semitic Languages: An International Handbook. Berlin-Boston: Walter de Gruyter. pp. 697–707. ISBN 9783110251586.
- Khan, Geoffrey (2019a). "The Neo-Aramaic Dialects of Eastern Anatolia and Northwestern Iran". The Languages and Linguistics of Western Asia: An Areal Perspective. Berlin-Boston: Walter de Gruyter. pp. 190–236. ISBN 9783110421743.
- Khan, Geoffrey (2019b). "The Neo-Aramaic Dialects and Their Historical Background". The Syriac World. London: Routledge. pp. 266–289. ISBN 9781138899018.
- Krotkoff, Georg (1990). "An Annotated Bibliography of Neo-Aramaic". Studies in Neo-Aramaic. Atlanta: Scholars Press. pp. 3–26. ISBN 9781555404307.
- Owens, Jonathan (2007). "Endangered Languages of the Middle East". Language Diversity Endangered. Berlin-New York: Walter de Gruyter. pp. 263–277. ISBN 9783110170504.
- Saadi, Abdul-Massih (2018). "Interdependence of Classical Syriac and Suryoyo of Tur Abdin (STA): Orthography for the STA". Neue Aramäische Studien: Geschichte und Gegenwart. Frankfurt am Main: Peter Lang. pp. 169–192. ISBN 9783631731314.
- Sabar, Yona (2003). "Aramaic, once an International Language, now on the Verge of Expiration: Are the Days of its Last Vestiges Numbered?". When Languages Collide: Perspectives on Language Conflict, Language Competition, and Language Coexistence. Columbus: Ohio State University Press. pp. 222–234. ISBN 9780814209134.
- Tezel, Sina (2015a). "Arabic or Ṣūrayt/Ṭūrōyo". Arabic and Semitic Linguistics Contextualized: A Festschrift for Jan Retsö. Wiesbaden: Harrassowitz Verlag. pp. 554–568.
- Tezel, Sina (2015b). "Neologisms in Ṣūrayt/Ṭūrōyo". Neo-Aramaic in Its Linguistic Context. Piscataway, NJ: Gorgias Press. pp. 100–109.
- Tezel, Aziz (2015). "The Turkish Lexical Influence on Ṣūrayt/Ṭūrōyo: A Preliminary Selection of Examples". Neo-Aramaic and its Linguistic Context. Piscataway, NJ: Gorgias Press. pp. 69–99. doi:10.31826/9781463236489-006. ISBN 9781463236489.
- Tomal, Maciej (2015). "Towards a Description of Written Ṣurayt/Ṭuroyo: Some Syntactic Functions of the Particle kal". Neo-Aramaic and its Linguistic Context. Piscataway, NJ: Gorgias Press. pp. 29–52.

=== Journal articles ===
- Brock, Sebastian P. (1989a). "Three Thousand Years of Aramaic Literature". ARAM Periodical. 1 (1): 11–23.
- Brock, Sebastian P. (1989b). "Some Observations on the Use of Classical Syriac in the Late Twentieth Century". Journal of Semitic Studies. 34 (2): 363–375. doi:10.1093/jss/XXXIV.2.363.
- Comfort, Anthony (2017). "Fortresses of the Tur Abdin and the Confrontation between Rome and Persia". Anatolian Studies. 67: 181–229. doi:10.1017/S0066154617000047. JSTOR 26571543. S2CID 164455185.
- Jastrow, Otto (1987). "The Tûrôyo Language Today" (PDF). Journal of Assyrian Academic Studies. 1: 7–16. Archived from the original (PDF) on 2020-07-15.
- Jastrow, Otto (1996). "Passive Formation in Ṭuroyo and Mlaḥsô". Israel Oriental Studies. 16: 49–57. ISBN 9004106464.
- Macuch, Rudolf (1990). "Recent Studies in Neo-Aramaic Dialects". Bulletin of the School of Oriental and African Studies. 53 (2): 214–223. doi:10.1017/S0041977X00026045. S2CID 162559782.
- Mengozzi, Alessandro (2011). "Neo-Aramaic Studies: A Survey of Recent Publications". Folia Orientalia. 48: 233–265.
- Saouk, Joseph (2015). "Quo vadis Turoyo? A Description of the Situation and the Needs of the Neo-Aramaic of Tur-Abdin (Turkey)". Parole de l'Orient. 40: 361–377.
- Weaver, Christina Michelle; Kiraz, George A. (2016). "Turoyo Neo-Aramaic in Northern New Jersey" (PDF). International Journal of the Sociology of Language. 237: 19–36.
- Yildiz, Efrem (2000). "The Aramaic Language and its Classification". Journal of Assyrian Academic Studies. 14 (1): 23–44.
