= Aramaic studies =

Academic field

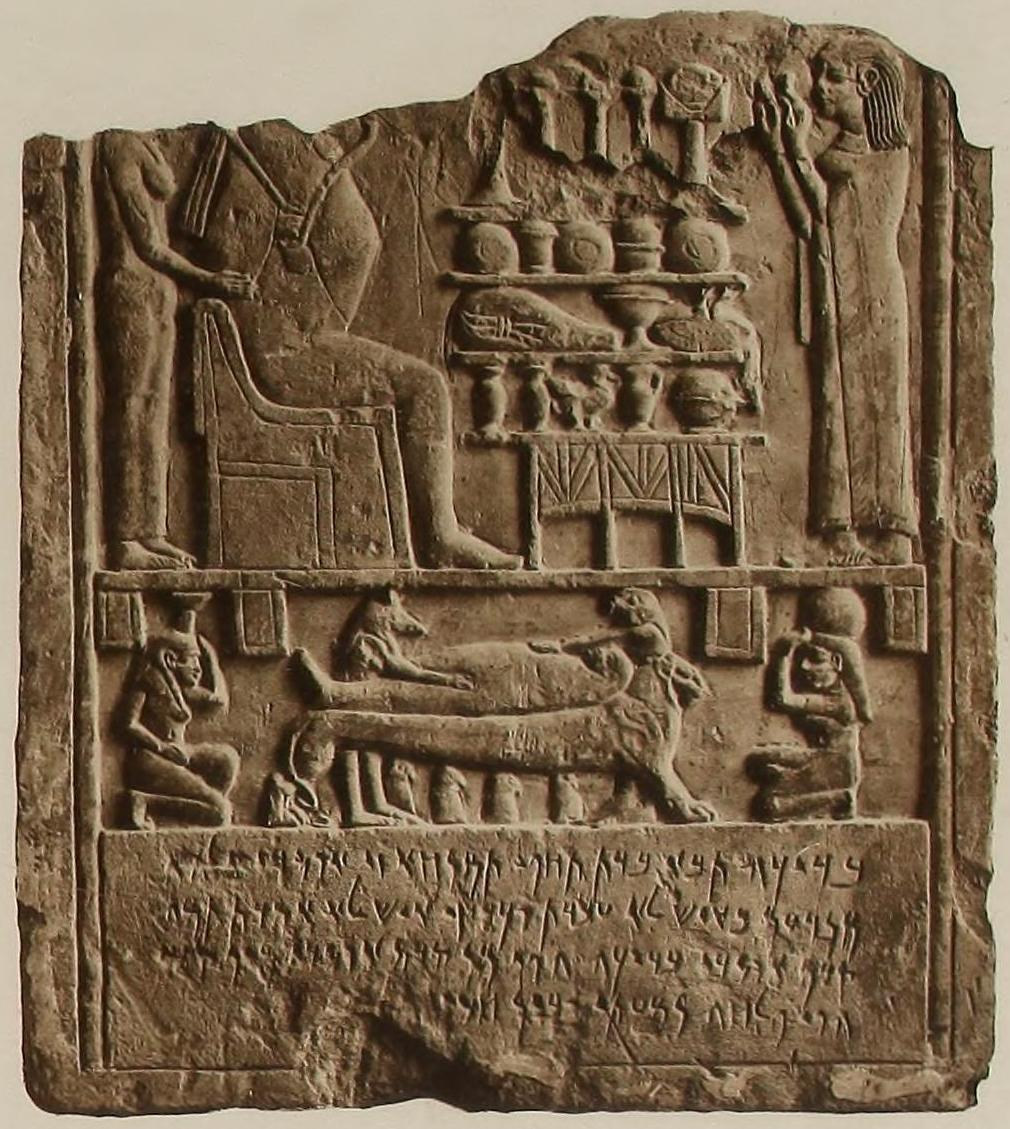
The Carpentras Stele was the first ancient inscription ever identified as Aramaic, in 1821

Aramaic studies, also called Aramaeology or Aramaistics, is the academic discipline concerned with the study of Aramaic, a Northwest Semitic language with several historical and modern varieties or dialects, and its literature. As a specific field within Semitic studies, Aramaic studies are closely related to similar disciplines, like Hebraic studies and Arabic studies. The field includes Syriac studies and the study of other Aramaic varieties. Specialists in Aramaic studies are known as Aramaists (less commonly Aramaeologists or Aramaicists) while scholars involved in Syriac studies specifically are known as Syriacists.

== History ==
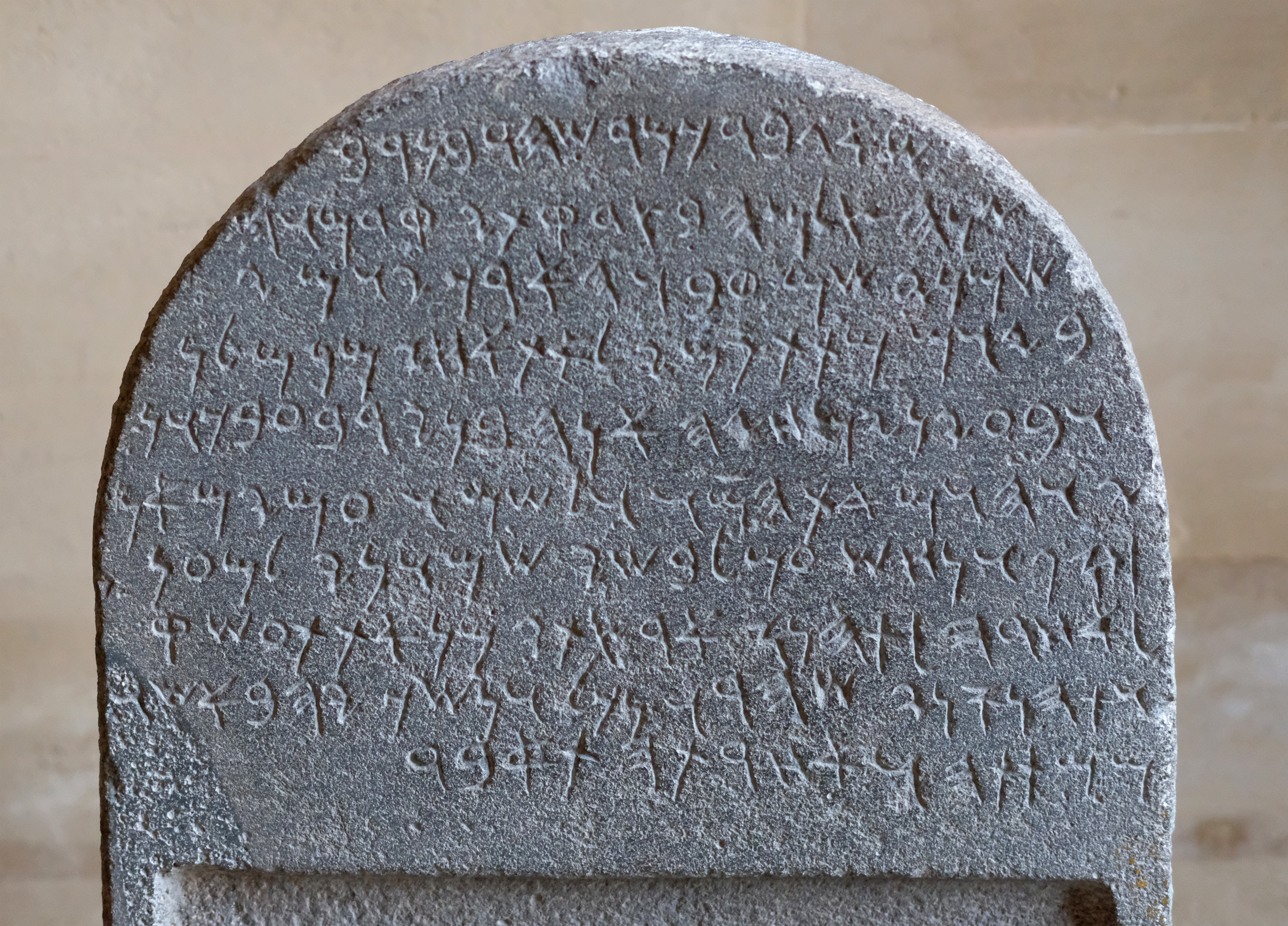
Aramaic inscription from Neirab, 7th century B.C.

As a distinctive academic discipline, Aramaic studies started to develop during the Early Modern period, and they were initially focused on the study of the Christian Aramaic heritage, embodied in Syriac language and cultural traditions of Syriac Christianity. The field was gradually widened, and by the 19th century expanded towards studies of ancient Aramaic heritage, that included all of the oldest (pre-Christian) varieties of Aramaic languages, and ancient Aramaic alphabet. On the other side, the field was also expanded towards modern periods, focused on the study of the remaining Neo-Aramaic languages, and modern cultural heritage of Neo-Aramaic communities.

During the 19th century, Aramaic studies were constituted as a modern scientific field of research. In the process, several traditional misconceptions were challenged and consequently abandoned, most notable of them being the long-standing "Chaldean misnomer" (Chaldaic, Chaldee) for the Biblical Aramaic. The exonymic origin and nature of the ancient Greek use of "Syrian" labels as designations for ancient Arameans and their language (in Septuagint and other Greek sources) was also analyzed, but conventional Syrian/Syriac nomenclature was kept in reference to Edessan Aramaic language, still labeled as Classical Syriac.

One of the main issues within the field was the question of historical periodization of Aramaic language, and adoption of specific terms for various historical stages, and branches of the Aramaic linguistic tree.

In modern times, Aramaic studies are organized within distinctive academic centers and programs, like those at the University of Oxford, University of Leiden, and University of Detroit Mercy. At some other universities, Aramaic studies are mostly incorporated into a more 'general' field of studies, such as Eastern Christianity at the School of Oriental and African Studies, University of London, as Eastern Christianity at Duke University, or as Semitic studies at the Freie Universität Berlin. Most students learn the Aramaic language and Syriac language within a biblical studies program.

== Specific disciplines ==
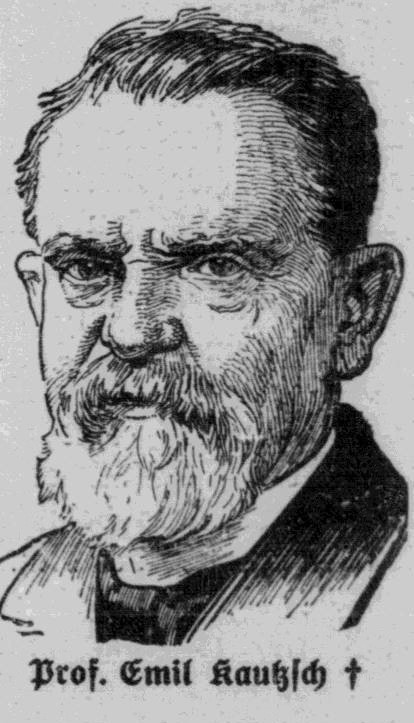
Emil Kautzsch (1841–1910)

Aramaic studies are branched into several disciplines, some of them interdisciplinary by nature of their research subjects, and thus shared with other closely related fields, like Jewish studies or Christian studies.

=== Neo-Aramaic studies ===
Neo-Aramaic studies represent a specific field of research within Aramaic studies, that is dedicated to the study of Neo-Aramaic languages, history and culture.

=== Syriac studies ===
Syriac studies represent a specific field of research within Aramaic studies, that is dedicated to the study of the Syriac language and Syriac Christianity.

=== Christian Aramaic studies ===
Christian Aramaic studies are an interdisciplinary field, both of Christian studies and of Aramaic studies, dedicated to the study of linguistic and cultural heritage of Aramaic-speaking Christian communities, historical and modern. Christian Aramaic studies emerged in Europe by the end of the 15th century, and developed gradually during the Early Modern period.

=== Jewish Aramaic studies ===
Jewish Aramaic studies are an interdisciplinary field, both of Jewish studies and of Aramaic studies, dedicated to the study of Judeo-Aramaic languages and cultural heritage of Aramaic-speaking Jewish communities, historical and modern.

=== Mandaean studies ===
Mandaean are dedicated to the study of Mandaic and the cultural heritage of Aramaic-speaking Mandaean communities, both historical and modern.

== Academic journals ==
Aramaic academic journals include the annual Aramaic Studies, a leading journal for Aramaic language and literature published by Brill Academic Publishers. The journal incorporates the previous Journal for the Aramaic Bible for a more inclusive scope, to include all aspects of Aramaic language and literature, even when not, or only indirectly, related to Biblical texts.

== See also ==
- Aram (region)
- Aramaic Targum
- Assyriology
- Eastern Christianity
- Language of Jesus
- Corpus Scriptorum Christianorum Orientalium
- Aramaic original New Testament theory
- Hebrew and Aramaic Lexicon of the Old Testament
- Comprehensive Aramaic Lexicon

== Sources ==
- Beyer, Klaus (1986). The Aramaic Language: Its Distribution and Subdivisions. Göttingen: Vandenhoeck & Ruprecht. ISBN 9783525535738.
- Brock, Sebastian P. (1971). "A Fragment of the Acta Pilati in Christian Palestinian Aramaic". The Journal of Theological Studies. 22 (1): 157–159. doi:10.1093/jts/XXII.I.157. JSTOR 23962351.
- Brock, Sebastian P. (1989). "Three Thousand Years of Aramaic Literature". ARAM Periodical. 1 (1): 11–23.
- Brock, Sebastian P. (1992). Studies in Syriac Christianity: History, Literature, and Theology. Aldershot: Variorum. ISBN 9780860783053.
- Brock, Sebastian P. (1994). "Syriac Studies in the Last Three Decades: Some Reflections". VI Symposium Syriacum 1992. Roma: Pontificium institutum studiorum orientalium. pp. 13–29. ISBN 9788872103050.
- Brock, Sebastian P. (1996). Syriac Studies: A Classified Bibliography, 1960-1990. Kaslik: Parole de l'Orient.
- Brock, Sebastian P. (2006). Fire from Heaven: Studies in Syriac Theology and Liturgy. Aldershot: Ashgate. ISBN 9780754659082.
- Burnett, Stephen G. (2005). "Christian Aramaism: The Birth and Growth of Aramaic Scholarship in the Sixteenth Century" (PDF). Seeking Out the Wisdom of the Ancients. Winona Lake: Eisenbrauns. pp. 421–436. Archived from the original (PDF) on 2022-10-09.
- Buth, Randall; Pierce, Chad (2014). "Hebraisti in Ancient Texts: Does Ἑβραϊστί Ever Mean Aramaic?". The Language Environment of First Century Judaea. Leiden-Boston: Brill. pp. 66–109. ISBN 9789004264410.
- Butts, Aaron M. (2019). "The Classical Syriac Language". The Syriac World. London: Routledge. pp. 222–242.
- Fitzmyer, Joseph A. (1997) [1974]. A Wandering Aramean: Collected Aramaic Essays. Grand Rapids: Eerdmans. ISBN 9780802848468.
- Gallagher, Edmon L. (2012). Hebrew Scripture in Patristic Biblical Theory: Canon, Language, Text. Leiden-Boston: Brill. ISBN 9789004228023.
- Griffith, Sidney H. (2002). "Christianity in Edessa and the Syriac-Speaking World: Mani, Bar Daysan, and Ephraem, the Struggle for Allegiance on the Aramean Frontier". Journal of the Canadian Society for Syriac Studies. 2: 5–20. doi:10.31826/jcsss-2009-020104. S2CID 166480216. Archived from the original on 2018-12-11.
- Gzella, Holger (2015). A Cultural History of Aramaic: From the Beginnings to the Advent of Islam. Leiden-Boston: Brill. ISBN 9789004285101.
- Healey, John F. (2007). "The Edessan Milieu and the Birth of Syriac" (PDF). Hugoye: Journal of Syriac Studies. 10 (2): 115–127.
- Heinrichs, Wolfhart, ed. (1990). Studies in Neo-Aramaic. Atlanta: Scholars Press. ISBN 9781555404307.
- Jastrow, Otto (1993) [1967]. Laut- und Formenlehre des neuaramäischen Dialekts von Mīdin im Ṭūr ʻAbdīn. Wiesbaden: Harrassowitz Verlag. ISBN 9783447033343.
- Jastrow, Otto (2002) [1992]. Lehrbuch der Ṭuroyo-Sprache. Wiesbaden: Harrassowitz Verlag. ISBN 9783447032131.
- Jastrow, Otto (2011). "Ṭuroyo and Mlaḥsô". The Semitic Languages: An International Handbook. Berlin-Boston: Walter de Gruyter. pp. 697–707. ISBN 9783110251586.
- Jobling, William J. (1996). "New Evidence for the History of Indigenous Aramaic Christianity in Southern Jordan". Sydney Studies in Society and Culture. 12: 62–73.
- Joosten, Jan (2010). "The Aramaic Background of the Seventy: Language, Culture and History". Bulletin of the International Organization for Septuagint and Cognate Studies. 43: 53–72.
- Kim, Ronald (2008). "Stammbaum or Continuum? The Subgrouping of Modern Aramaic Dialects Reconsidered". Journal of the American Oriental Society. 128 (3): 505–531.
- Kautzsch, Emil F. (1884a). Grammatik des Biblisch-Aramäischen: Mit einer Kritischen Erörterung der aramäischen Wörter im Neuen Testament. Leipzig: Vogel.
- Kautzsch, Emil F. (1884b). "The Aramaic Language". Hebraica. 1 (1–2): 98–115. doi:10.1086/368803. JSTOR 527111.
- Lipiński, Edward (2000). The Aramaeans: Their Ancient History, Culture, Religion. Leuven: Peeters Publishers. ISBN 9789042908598.
- Mengozzi, Alessandro (2011). "Neo-Aramaic Studies: A Survey of Recent Publications". Folia Orientalia. 48: 233–265. hdl:2318/93047.
- Messo, Johny (2011). "The Origin of the Terms Syria(n) and Suryoyo: Once Again". Parole de l'Orient. 36: 111–125.
- Morgenstern, Matthew (2011). Studies in Jewish Babylonian Aramaic: Based Upon Early Eastern Manuscripts. Winona Lake: Eisenbrauns. ISBN 9789004370128.
- Moriggi, Marco (2012). "Middle Aramaic: Outlines for a Definition". Quaderni di Semitistica. 28: 279–289.
- Nöldeke, Theodor (1871). "Die Namen der aramäischen Nation und Sprache". Zeitschrift der Deutschen Morgenländischen Gesellschaft. 25 (1–2): 113–131. JSTOR 43366019.
- Prym, Eugen; Socin, Albert (1881). Der neu-aramaeische Dialekt des Ṭûr 'Abdîn. Göttingen: Vandenhoeck & Ruprecht's Verlag.
- Ruzer, Serge (2014). "Hebrew versus Aramaic as Jesus' Language: Notes on Early Opinions by Syriac Authors". The Language Environment of First Century Judaea. Leiden-Boston: Brill. pp. 182–205. ISBN 9789004264410.
- Tezel, Aziz (2003). Comparative Etymological Studies in the Western Neo-Syriac (Ṭūrōyo) Lexicon: With Special Reference to Homonyms, Related Words and Borrowings with Cultural Signification. Uppsala: Uppsala University Library. ISBN 9789155455552.
- Tezel, Sina (2015). "Arabic or Ṣūrayt/Ṭūrōyo". Arabic and Semitic Linguistics Contextualized: A Festschrift for Jan Retsö. Wiesbaden: Harrassowitz Verlag. pp. 554–568.
- Tezel, Sina (2015). "Neologisms in Ṣūrayt/Ṭūrōyo". Neo-Aramaic in Its Linguistic Context. Piscataway, NJ: Gorgias Press. pp. 100–109.
- Teule, Herman (2007). "Current Trends in Syriac Studies". Eastern Crossroads: Essays on Medieval Christian Legacy. Piscataway, NJ: Gorgias Press. pp. 387–400. doi:10.31826/9781463212827-024. ISBN 9781463212827.
- Vanderhooft, David S. (2017). "Depictions of כשדים 'Chaldeans' in Judean Prophecy and Historiography". Now It Happened in Those Days: Studies in Biblical, Assyrian, and Other Ancient Near Eastern Historiography. Winona Lake: Eisenbrauns. pp. 171–182.
- Wevers, John W. (2001). "Aram and Aramaean in the Septuagint". The World of the Aramaeans. Vol. 1. Sheffield: Sheffield Academic Press. pp. 237–251. ISBN 9781841271583.
- Wilkinson, Robert J. (2016). "Constructing Syriac in Latin – Establishing the Identity of Syriac in the West over a Century and a Half (c.1550-c.1700): An Account of Grammatical and Extra-Linguistic Determinants". Babelao. 5: 169–283. doi:10.14428/babelao.vol5.2016.20183. S2CID 182619543.
- Younger, Kenneth Lawson (2016). A Political History of the Arameans: From Their Origins to the End of Their Polities. Atlanta: SBL Press. ISBN 9781628370843.
