= Neo-Aramaic languages =

Modern varieties of the Aramaic language

Neo-Aramaic
- Modern Aramaic
- Geographic distribution: Armenia, Iraq, Iran, Georgia, Jordan, Syria, Turkey, Lebanon, Israel, Palestine
- Ethnicity: Assyrians, Israeli Christians, Arab Christians, Maronites (Including Lebanese Maronite Christians), Other Lebanese Christians, Antiochian Christians
- Linguistic classification: Afro-Asiatic: Semitic; West Semitic; Central Semitic; Northwest Semitic; Aramaic; Neo-Aramaic
- Subdivisions: Western Neo-Aramaic; Central Neo-Aramaic; Northeastern Neo-Aramaic; Neo-Mandaic; Lebanese Aramaic†

Language codes
- Glottolog: aram1259 Aramaic

Distribution of Neo-Aramaic languages

The Neo-Aramaic or Modern Aramaic languages are varieties of Aramaic that evolved during the late medieval and early modern periods, and continue to the present day as vernacular (spoken) languages of modern Aramaic-speaking communities. Within the field of Aramaic studies, classification of Neo-Aramaic languages has been a subject of particular interest among scholars, who proposed several divisions, into two (western and eastern), three (western, central and eastern) or four (western, central, northeastern and southeastern) primary groups.

In terms of sociolinguistics, Neo-Aramaic languages are also classified by various ethnolinguistic and religiolinguistic criteria, spanning across ethnic and religious lines, and encompassing groups that adhere to Christianity, Judaism, Mandaeism and Islam.

Christian Neo-Aramaic languages have long co-existed with Classical Syriac as a literary and liturgical language of Syriac Christianity. Since Classical Syriac and similar archaic forms, like Targumic Aramaic (old Judeo-Aramaic variety) and Classical Mandaic, are no longer vernacular, they are not classified as Neo-Aramaic languages. However, the classical languages continue to have influence over the colloquial Neo-Aramaic languages.

The most prominent Neo-Aramaic varieties belong to Central Neo-Aramaic and Northeastern Neo-Aramaic groups. They are spoken primarily (though not wholly exclusively) by ethnic Assyrians, who are adherents of the Assyrian Church of the East, Ancient Church of the East, Syriac Orthodox Church, Chaldean Catholic Church, and some other denominations. Other speakers include Muslim and Christian Arameans (Syriacs) from Maaloula and Jubb'adin, who speak the endangered Western Neo-Aramaic language, Mandaeans, and some Mizrahi Jews. Nearly all varieties are now regarded as endangered or at risk of disappearing, especially as migration has changed the communities in which Neo-Aramaic is spoken. Some varieties are already believed to have become extinct.

== History ==
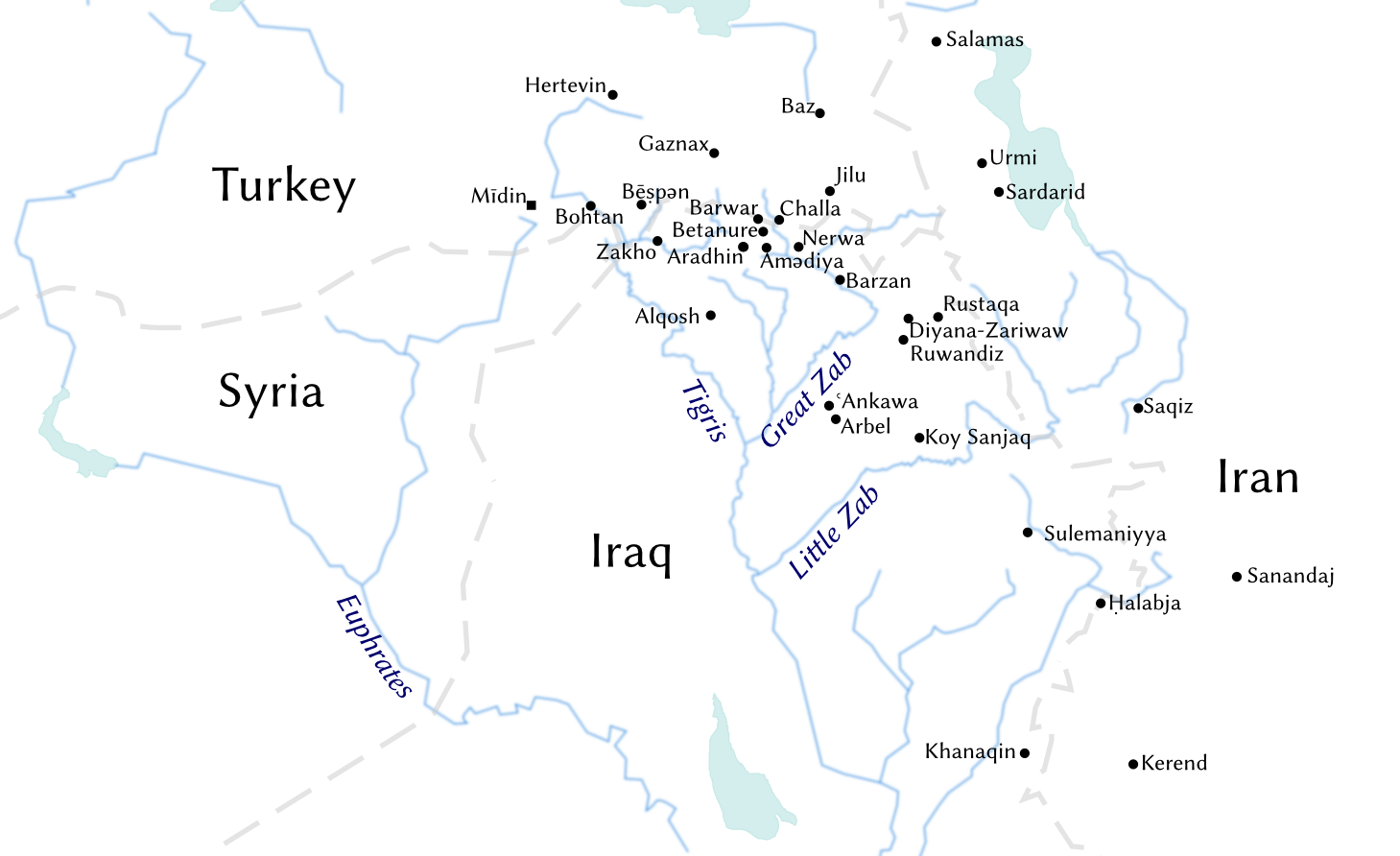
Places where varieties of North-Eastern Neo-Aramaic are spoken

Aramaic had become the lingua franca of the Neo-Assyrian Empire from the 8th century BC, and was retained by the following Neo-Babylonian Empire and Achaemenid Empires, gradually displacing the hitherto dominant Akkadian language of the Assyrians and Babylonians. During the Late Antiquity, and throughout the Middle Ages, the linguistic development of the Aramaic language was marked by the coexistence of literary and vernacular forms, those of Assyria and Babylonia retaining an Akkadian grammatical influence. A dominant literary form among Aramaic-speaking Christians was Edessan Aramaic (Urhaya) evolving in the Neo-Assyrian kingdom of Osroene, which came to be known as Classical Syriac (a term coined by western scholars). At the same time, Aramaic-speaking Jews had their own literary languages (Judeo-Aramaic languages). Along with dominant literary forms, various vernacular forms were also spoken, with distinctive regional variations. By the late medieval period, literary forms used by Aramaic-speaking Christians were confided mainly to the religious sphere of life (liturgical use), while vernacular forms continued to develop into the early modern period. Gradually, some of those Neo-Aramaic vernacular forms also started to be used for literary purposes.

During the 19th century, systematic studies of Neo-Aramaic languages were initiated for the first time, and by the beginning of the 20th century some Neo-Aramaic varieties already entered into the modern phase of their linguistic development, marked by the appearance of various Neo-Aramaic publications, and also by the establishment of modern schools and other institutions.

That development was severely interrupted by the breakout of the First World War (1914–1918) and the atrocities committed against Aramaic-speaking communities during the Seyfo (Assyrian genocide). The displacement of many Assyrian communities from their native regions disrupted both the four millennia long geographical and historical Assyrian continuity and the linguistic continuum, and also created new groups of Neo-Aramaic speakers throughout the diaspora. Those events had a profound impact on further development of Neo-Aramaic communities, affecting all spheres of life, including various cultural issues related to their language.

== Varieties ==
Red markers represent Christian Neo-Aramaic varieties while blue represents Jewish ones and purple represents both spoken in the same town.

Throughout the history of Aramaic language, a dialectal boundary dividing western and eastern varieties has existed, running transversely across the Syrian Desert from southeast to northwest.

Only Western Neo-Aramaic, spoken in Maaloula and Jubb'adin in the Anti-Lebanon Mountains by Christian and Muslim Aramean (Syriac) communities, remains as a witness to the western varieties, which used to be much more widespread in the Levant (as evidenced in varieties from the first millennium CE such as Samaritan Aramaic, Jewish Palestinian Aramaic and Christian Palestinian Aramaic).

The other Neo-Aramaic languages are all eastern varieties, mostly spoken by ethnic Assyrian people, but with little homogeneity. Most distinct in this group is Modern Mandaic, which has low intelligibility with other varieties. It is the direct descendant of Classical Mandaic, which traces its roots back to the Persian-influenced Aramaic of the Arsacid Empire. Modern Mandaic is spoken fluently by about only a few thousand people.

== Speakers ==
The number of modern speakers of Neo-Aramaic languages is estimated from approximately 575,000 to 1,000,000, the vast majority of whom are Assyrian people. The largest of subgroups of speakers are Assyrian Neo-Aramaic with approximately 500,000 speakers, Chaldean Neo-Aramaic with approximately 240,000 speakers, Turoyo (Surayt) with approximately 100,000 speakers and a few thousand speakers of other Neo-Aramaic languages (i.e. Modern Judeo-Aramaic varieties and Bohtan Neo-Aramaic, among others), which give a total of over 870,000 fluent Neo-Aramaic speakers, although a larger number have some knowledge of the language, but lack fluency.

== See also ==
- Bible translations into Aramaic
- Bible translations into Syriac
- Syriac alphabet
- Syriac literature
- Syriac studies
- Romanization of Syriac

== Sources ==
- Arnold, Werner (1990). "New materials on Western Neo-Aramaic". Studies in Neo-Aramaic. Atlanta: Scholars Press. pp. 131–149. ISBN 9781555404307.
- Arnold, Werner (2008). "The Roots qrṭ and qrṣ in Western Neo-Aramaic". Aramaic in Its Historical and Linguistic Setting. Wiesbaden: Harrassowitz Verlag. pp. 305–311. ISBN 9783447057875.
- Arnold, Werner (2012). "Western Neo-Aramaic". The Semitic Languages: An International Handbook. Berlin-Boston: Walter de Gruyter. pp. 685–696. ISBN 9783110251586.
- Beyer, Klaus (1986). The Aramaic Language: Its Distribution and Subdivisions. Göttingen: Vandenhoeck & Ruprecht. ISBN 9783525535738.
- Brock, Sebastian P. (1989). "Three Thousand Years of Aramaic Literature". ARAM Periodical. 1 (1): 11–23.
- Häberl, Charles G. (2012). "Neo-Mandaic". The Semitic Languages: An International Handbook. Berlin-Boston: Walter de Gruyter. pp. 725–737. ISBN 9783110251586.
- Heinrichs, Wolfhart, ed. (1990). Studies in Neo-Aramaic. Atlanta: Scholars Press. ISBN 9781555404307.
- Jastrow, Otto (1993) [1967]. Laut- und Formenlehre des neuaramäischen Dialekts von Mīdin im Ṭūr ʻAbdīn. Wiesbaden: Harrassowitz Verlag. ISBN 9783447033343.
- Jastrow, Otto (2002) [1992]. Lehrbuch der Ṭuroyo-Sprache. Wiesbaden: Harrassowitz Verlag. ISBN 9783447032131.
- Jastrow, Otto (2012). "Ṭuroyo and Mlaḥsô". The Semitic Languages: An International Handbook. Berlin-Boston: Walter de Gruyter. pp. 697–707. ISBN 9783110251586.
- Joseph, John B. (2000). The Modern Assyrians of the Middle East: A History of Their Encounter with Western Christian Missions, Archaeologists, and Colonial Powers. Leiden: Brill. ISBN 9004116419.
- Kapeliuk, Olga (2012). "Language Contact between Aramaic Dialects and Iranian". The Semitic Languages: An International Handbook. Berlin-Boston: Walter de Gruyter. pp. 738–747. ISBN 9783110251586.
- Kiraz, George A. (2007). "Kthobonoyo Syriac: Some Observations and Remarks" (PDF). Hugoye: Journal of Syriac Studies. 10 (2): 129–142.
- Khan, Geoffrey (2012). "North-Eastern Neo-Aramaic". The Semitic Languages: An International Handbook. Berlin-Boston: Walter de Gruyter. pp. 708–724. ISBN 9783110251586.
- Khan, Geoffrey (2018). "Sound Symbolism in Neo-Aramaic". Near Eastern and Arabian Essays: Studies in Honour of John F. Healey. Oxford: Oxford University Press. pp. 197–214. ISBN 978-0-19-883106-8.
- Khan, Geoffrey (2018). "Remarks on the Historical Development and Syntax of the Copula in North-Eastern Neo-Aramaic Dialects". Aramaic Studies. 16 (2): 234–269. doi:10.1163/17455227-01602010. S2CID 195503300.
- Khan, Geoffrey (2019). "The Neo-Aramaic Dialects of Eastern Anatolia and Northwestern Iran". The Languages and Linguistics of Western Asia: An Areal Perspective. Berlin-Boston: Walter de Gruyter. pp. 190–236. ISBN 9783110421743.
- Khan, Geoffrey (2019). "The Neo-Aramaic Dialects of Northern Iraq". The Languages and Linguistics of Western Asia: An Areal Perspective. Berlin-Boston: Walter de Gruyter. pp. 305–353. ISBN 9783110421743.
- Khan, Geoffrey (2019). "The Neo-Aramaic Dialects of Western Iran". The Languages and Linguistics of Western Asia: An Areal Perspective. Berlin-Boston: Walter de Gruyter. pp. 481–532. ISBN 9783110421743.
- Khan, Geoffrey (2019). "The Neo-Aramaic Dialects and Their Historical Background". The Syriac World. London: Routledge. pp. 266–289. ISBN 9781138899018.
- Kim, Ronald (2008). "Stammbaum or Continuum? The Subgrouping of Modern Aramaic Dialects Reconsidered". Journal of the American Oriental Society. 128 (3): 505–531.
- Krotkoff, Georg (1990). "An Annotated Bibliography of Neo-Aramaic". Studies in Neo-Aramaic. Atlanta: Scholars Press. pp. 3–26. ISBN 9781555404307.
- Mengozzi, Alessandro (2011). "Neo-Aramaic Studies: A Survey of Recent Publications". Folia Orientalia. 48: 233–265.
- Murre van den Berg, Heleen (2008). "Classical Syriac, Neo-Aramaic, and Arabic in the Churchof the East and the Chaldean Church between 1500 and 1800". Aramaic in Its Historical and Linguistic Setting. Wiesbaden: Harrassowitz Verlag. pp. 335–352. ISBN 9783447057875.
- Poizat, Bruno (2008). Manuel de Soureth (in French). Paris: Geuthner. p. 271. ISBN 978-2-7053-3804-6.
- Prym, Eugen; Socin, Albert (1881). Der neu-aramaeische Dialekt des Ṭûr 'Abdîn. Göttingen: Vandenhoeck & Ruprecht's Verlag.
- Père Jean Rhétoré (1912). Grammaire de la Langue Soureth (in French). Mossoul: imprimerie des Pères Dominicains. p. 255.
- Costaz, Louis (1963). Syriac-English Dictionary. imprimerie catholique de Beyrouth. p. 421.
- Macuch, Rudolf (1990). "Recent Studies in Neo-Aramaic Dialects". Bulletin of the School of Oriental and African Studies. 53 (2): 214–223. doi:10.1017/S0041977X00026045. S2CID 162559782.
- Prym, Eugen; Socin, Albert (1881). Der neu-aramaeische Dialekt des Ṭûr 'Abdîn. Göttingen: Vandenhoeck & Ruprecht's Verlag.
- Oraham, A.J. (1941). Oraham's Dictionary of the stabilized and enriched Assyrian Language and English. p. 576.
- Sabar, Yona (2002). A Jewish Neo-Aramaic Dictionary: Dialects of Amidya, Dihok, Nerwa and Zakho, Northwestern Iraq. Wiesbaden: Otto Harrassowitz Verlag. ISBN 9783447045575.
- Sabar, Yona (2003). "Aramaic, once an International Language, now on the Verge of Expiration: Are the Days of its Last Vestiges Numbered?". When Languages Collide: Perspectives on Language Conflict, Language Competition, and Language Coexistence. Columbus: Ohio State University Press. pp. 222–234. ISBN 9780814209134.
- Tezel, Aziz (2003). Comparative Etymological Studies in the Western Neo-Syriac (Ṭūrōyo) Lexicon: With Special Reference to Homonyms, Related Words and Borrowings with Cultural Signification. Uppsala: Uppsala University Library. ISBN 9789155455552.
- Tezel, Sina (2015). "Arabic or Ṣūrayt/Ṭūrōyo". Arabic and Semitic Linguistics Contextualized: A Festschrift for Jan Retsö. Wiesbaden: Harrassowitz Verlag. pp. 554–568.
- Tezel, Sina (2015). "Neologisms in Ṣūrayt/Ṭūrōyo". Neo-Aramaic in Its Linguistic Context. Piscataway, NJ: Gorgias Press. pp. 100–109.
- Waltisberg, Michael (2016). Syntax des Ṭuroyo (= Semitica Viva 55). Wiesbaden: Otto Harrassowitz Verlag. ISBN 978-3-447-10731-0.
- Weninger, Stefan (2012). "Aramaic-Arabic Language Contact". The Semitic Languages: An International Handbook. Berlin-Boston: Walter de Gruyter. pp. 747–755. ISBN 9783110251586.
- Yildiz, Efrem (2000). "The Aramaic Language and its Classification". Journal of Assyrian Academic Studies. 14 (1): 23–44.
