= Mlaḥsô language =

Extinct Aramaic language of Turkey and Syria

Mlaḥso
- Suryoyo, Surayt
- ܡܠܰܚܣܳܐ Mlaḥsô ܣܘܪܝܝܐ Suryô
- Native to: Turkey, Syria
- Region: Originally two villages (Mlaḥsô and ˁAnşa) near Lice in Diyarbakır Province of southeastern Turkey, later also Qamishli in northeastern Syria.
- Extinct: 1999
- Language family: Afro-Asiatic: Semitic; Central Semitic; Northwest Semitic; Aramaic; Eastern Aramaic; Central Neo-Aramaic; Mlaḥso

Language codes
- ISO 639-3: lhs
- Glottolog: mlah1239
- ELP: Mlaḥsô
- Mlaḥsô is an Extinct language according to the classification system of the UNESCO Atlas of the World's Languages in Danger

Mlaḥsô or Mlahso (Syriac: ܡܠܰܚܣܳܐ), sometimes referred to as Suryoyo or Surayt, is an extinct or dormant Central Neo-Aramaic language. It was traditionally spoken in eastern Anatolia and later also in northeastern Syria by ethnically Assyrian Syriac Orthodox Christians.

The Mlaḥsô language (Surayt of Mlaḥsô) is closely related to the Surayt of Turabdin but sufficiently different to be considered a separate language, with the syntax of the language having retained more features of Classical Syriac than Turoyo. It was spoken in the villages of Mlaḥsô (Turkish: Yünlüce, Kurdish: Mela), a village established by two monks from the Tur Abdin mountain range, and in the village of ˁAnşa near Lice, Diyarbakır, Turkey.

== Etymology ==
The name of the village and the language is derived from the earlier Aramaic word mālaḥtā, 'salt marsh'. The literary Syriac name for the language is Mlaḥthoyo. The native speakers of Mlaḥsô referred to their language simply as Suryô, or Syriac.

== History and distribution ==
According to the oral tradition of the people of Mlaḥsô, their village was founded several centuries ago by two brothers from Midyat. The tradition recounts that the brothers had a dream in which they were instructed to leave Midyat and build a church at a location that would be revealed to them. Following this vision, they eventually arrived in Mlaḥsô and constructed the church of Mar Smuni. This church remained in existence for centuries until 1915–1916, when most of the inhabitants of Mlaḥsô were massacred during the Sayfo (events of that period).

Linguistic evidence supports the notion that the Mlaḥsô language and Turoyo were once part of a common linguistic unit before diverging into distinct languages. This suggests that while both languages share a common origin, they must have separated several centuries ago, each developing along an independent trajectory.

The language was still spoken by a handful of people in the 1970s. The last fluent native speaker of Mlaḥsô, Ibrahim Ḥanna, died in 1999 in Qamishli. His daughters, Munira in Qamishli, Shamiram in Lebanon, and son Dr. Isḥaq Ibrahim in Germany are the only speakers left with some limited native proficiency of the language. Recordings of Ibrahim Ḥanna speaking the language are available on Heidelberg University's Semitic Sound Archive which were done by Otto Jastrow, a prominent German semiticist who is credited as the modern "discoverer" of the language and published the first modern research papers on the existence of Mlaḥsô and its linguistic features.

On 3 May 2009, a historical event in the history of the Mlaḥsô Surayt language took place. The Suroyo TV television station aired the program series Dore w yawmotho, which was about the village Mlaḥsô (and the Tur Abdin village Tamarze). Dr. Isḥaq Ibrahim, the son of Ibrahim Ḥanna, was a guest and spoke in the Mlaḥsô language with his sisters Shamiram in Lebanon and Munira in Qamishli live on the phone. Otto Jastrow was also interviewed regarding his expertise on Mlaḥsô. Assyrians from Tur Abdin and those present at the show were able to hear the language spoken live for the first time at the event.

The extinction of Mlaḥsô can be attributed to the small amount of original speakers of the language, and them being limited to two isolated villages, resulting in a disproportionate loss of speakers during the Assyrian genocide compared to Turoyo and other variants of Neo-Aramaic.

== Phonology ==
Mlahsô is phonologically less conservative than Turoyo. This is particularly noticeable in the use of s and z for classical θ and ð. The classical v has been retained though, while it has collapsed into w in Turoyo. Also sometimes y (IPA /j/) replaces ġ. Mlaḥsô also renders the combination of vowel plus y as a single, fronted vowel rather than a diphthong or a glide.

=== Consonants ===
	Labial		Dental			Alveolar		Palato-alveolar		Palatal	Velar		Uvular	Pharyn- geal		Glottal
	Labial		plain		emphatic	plain		Palato-alveolar		Palatal	Velar		Uvular	Pharyn- geal		Glottal
Nasal		m					n									
Plosive	p	b	t	d	tˤ						k	ɡ	q			ʔ
Affricate								tʃ	dʒ							
Fricative	f	v			sˤ	s	z	ʃ	ʒ		x	ɣ		ħ	ʕ	h
Approximant		w	l							j					ʕ	
Trill			r													

=== Vowels ===
Mlahsô has the following set of vowels:

- Close front unrounded vowel – /i/
- Close-mid front unrounded vowel – /e/
- Open front unrounded vowel – /a/
- Open back rounded vowel – /ɒ/
- Close back rounded vowel – /u/

== Morphology ==
Mlaḥsô is more conservative than Turoyo in grammar and vocabulary, using classical Syriac words and constructions while also preserving the original Aramaic form.

== Vocabulary ==
English	Mlaḥsô
person	nṓšo
father	avó
paternal uncle	dozó
trouble	renyó
donkey	ḥmṓrō
one	ḥā
door	tár'ṓ
goat	ḗzō
great, big	rābṓ
house	baytṓ
ten	'esrṓ
grapes	'envḗ
mouth	pēmṓ
morning	safrṓ
three	tlōsō
sleep	šensṓ
hand	īzṓ
seven	šav'ṓ
today	yōmā́n
in, into	lġāv
brother	āḥṓ
why	lmūn
what	mūn
much, many, very	sāy
town	mzītṓ
cock	toġó

=== Example phrases ===
English	Mlaḥsô
They sleep	dōmxī́
I wash	māsī́ġno
He loved	rhī́mle
She gave	hī́vla
I sold	zābḗnli
He demanded	tlī́ble
He stole	gnī́vle
His house	baytā́v
His place	duksā́v
From him	mēnā́v

=== Example sentences ===
English	Mlaḥsô
Where is my hen?	eyko-yo talġuntézi

== See also ==
- Surayt of Turabdin
- Syriac language
- Assyrian people
