= Yünlüce, Lice =

Village in Turkey

Yünlüce
- Neighbourhood
- Location in Turkey
- Coordinates: 38.4678°N 40.7254°E
- Country: Turkey
- Province: Diyarbakır
- District: Lice
- Population (2022): 298
- Time zone: UTC+3 (TRT)

Yünlüce (Kurdish: Melê; Syriac: Mlaḥso) (Note: Also known as Al-Malāḥah, Malaḥto, Malahto, Mallāḥa, Mellaha, Mete, or Mlaḥsô.) is a neighbourhood in the municipality and district of Lice, Diyarbakır Province in Turkey. It is populated by Kurds and had a population of 298 in 2022.

== Etymology ==
It has been suggested that the village's name in Kurdish and Syriac is derived from mālaḥtā ("saltworks" or "salt garden" in Syriac).

== History ==
Mlaḥso (today called Yünlüce) was historically inhabited by Syriac Orthodox Christians. In the Syriac Orthodox patriarchal register of dues of 1870, it was recorded that the village had 34 households, who paid 79 dues, and was served by the Church of Mortī Šmūnī and two priests. Outside of the village there were churches of Mar Tuma, Mar Eliyo, and Nǎbi Yawnan. In 1914, it was populated by 800 Syriacs, according to the list presented to the Paris Peace Conference by the Assyro-Chaldean delegation. It had 200–300 Christian families, including Armenians and Syriacs, all of whom spoke the Mlaḥsô language. The village was destroyed and almost all of the villagers were killed by Muslim Kurds from the neighbouring villages amidst the Sayfo. The name of the village was consequently Turkified to Yünlüce.

== Bibliography ==
- Al-Jeloo, Nicholas (2019). "Who were the Assyrians of Bitlis?". In Mehmet İnbaşı; Mehmet Demirtaş (eds.). Tarihî ve Kültürel Yönleriyle Bitlis. Vol. II. Bitlis Eren Üniversitesi Yayınları. pp. 363–390.
- Bcheiry, Iskandar (2009). The Syriac Orthodox Patriarchal Register of Dues of 1870: An Unpublished Historical Document from the Late Ottoman Period. Gorgias Press.
- Bcheiry, Iskandar (2019). "Digitizing and Schematizing the Archival Material from the Late Ottoman Period Found in the Monastery of al-Zaʿfarān in Southeast Turkey". Atla Summary of Proceedings. 72 (January): 50–61. doi:10.31046/proceedings.2018.113.
- Bednarowicz, Sebastian (2018). "Before and After Linguicide: a Linguistic Aspect of the Sayfo". In Shabo Talay; Soner g. Barthoma (eds.). Sayfo 1915: An Anthology of Essays on the Genocide of Assyrians/Arameans during the First World War. Gorgias Press. pp. 365–384.
- Gaunt, David (2006). Massacres, Resistance, Protectors: Muslim-Christian Relations in Eastern Anatolia during World War I. Gorgias Press.
- Jastrow, Otto (1994). Der neuaramäische Dialekt von Mlaḥsô (in German). Harrassowitz Verlag.
- Jongerden, Joost; Verheij, Jelle, eds. (2012). Social Relations in Ottoman Diyarbekir, 1870-1915. Brill.
- Malmîsanij, Mehemed (1989). Pîro; Baran; Şêxbizinî (eds.). "Bazı yörelerde Dımıli ve Kurmanci lehçelerinin köylere göre dağılımı - III -". Berhem (in Turkish). 4: 54. ISSN 1100-0910.
- Talay, Shabo (2017). "Sayfo, Firman, Qafle: The First World War from the Perspective of Syriac Christians". In David Gaunt; Naures Atto; Soner O. Barthoma (eds.). Let Them Not Return: Sayfo – The Genocide against the Assyrian, Syriac and Chaldean Christians in the Ottoman Empire (PDF). pp. 132–147.
