= Bible translations into Aramaic =

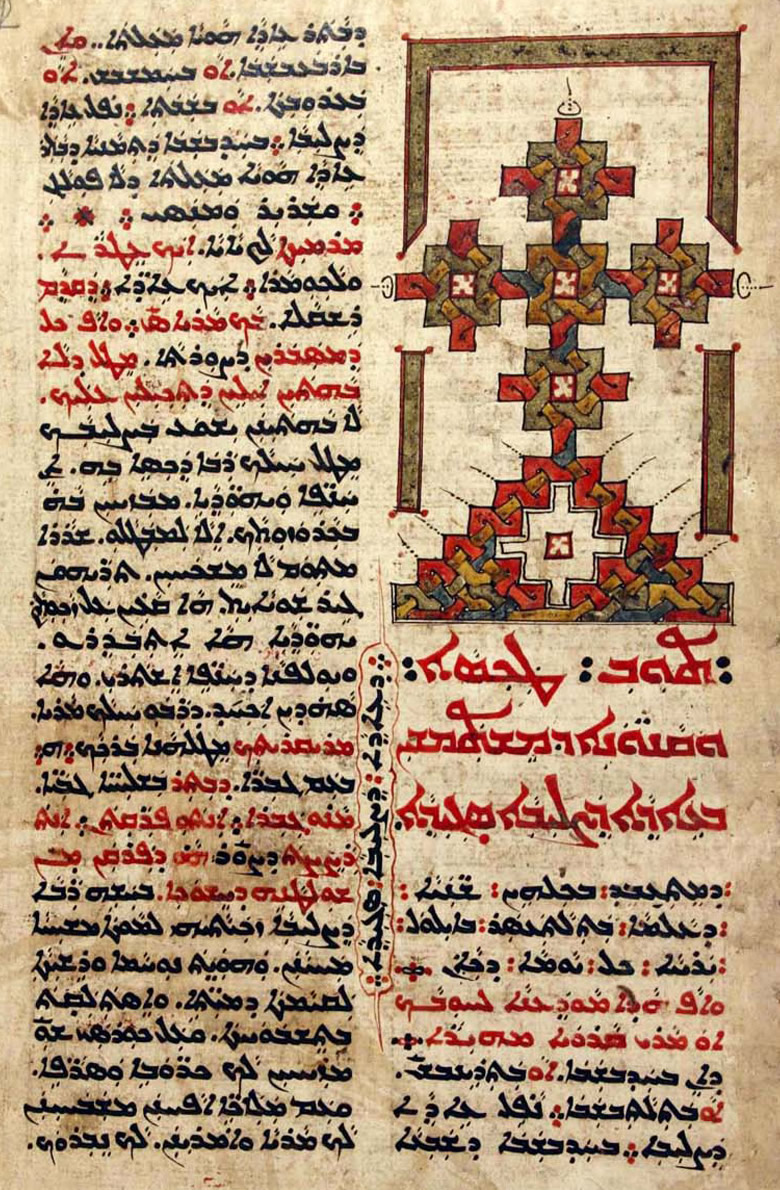
Syriac New Testament lectionary, the text is taken from the Peshitta version.

Bible translations into Aramaic covers both Jewish translations into Aramaic (Targum) and Christian translations into Aramaic, also called Syriac (Peshitta).

== Jewish translations ==
Aramaic translations of the Tanakh (the Hebrew Bible) played an important role in the liturgy and learning of rabbinic Judaism. Each such translation is called a targum (plural: targumim). During Talmudic times the targum was interpolated within the public reading of the Torah in the synagogue, verse by verse (a tradition that continues among Yemenite Jews to this day). Targumim are also an important source for Jewish exegesis of the Bible, and had a major influence on medieval interpreters (most notably Rashi). Maimonides (Hilchot Ishut 8:34) writes that the Talmudic definition of a "person who knows how to read and translate the Torah into Aramaic" refers to "the Aramaic translation of Onkelos".

== Christian translations ==
In the Syriac (Eastern Aramaic) language the Peshitta (Syriac: "common version") serves as the Bible of churches in the Syriac tradition (Church of the East, Chaldean Catholic, and Syriac Orthodox). The history of Christian Translations of the Bible into Syriac language includes: the Diatessaron, the Old Syriac versions (Curetonian and Sinaitic), the Peshitta, the Philoxenian version, the Harklean Version and the recent United Bible Societies' modern Aramaic New Testament.

About AD 500 a Christian Palestinian Aramaic version was made. It contains 2 Peter, 2-3 John, Jude, and Revelation. It is a representative of the Caesarean text-type and is a unique translation different from any other which was made into Syriac. These are among the manuscripts used by John Gwynn in 1893 to complete his edition of the Catholic Epistles. In 1892 Agnes Smith Lewis discovered the manuscript of the Palestinian Syriac lectionary in the library of Saint Catherine's Monastery on Mount Sinai. It is designated by Syr^{pal}.

The first revision of the New Testament from the Syriac into Turoyo language (Western Aramaic in Syriac and Latin script) was made by Malphono Yuhanun Üzel (Bar Shabo), Benjamin Bar Shabo and Yahkup Bilgic in 2009 with notes from Harclean and Philoxenios. This commission "Sihto du Kthovo Qadisho Suryoyo" works specially to preach the Gospel in Aramaic all over the world.

== See also ==
- Biblical Aramaic
- Language of Jesus
- List of Syriac New Testament manuscripts
