= Christian studies =

Field of research

Christian studies is an academic discipline covering the Bible, the history of Christianity, Christian theology and Christian spirituality. It is a common degree program at Christian colleges.

== See also ==
- Bible study (Christianity)
- Buddhist studies
- Hindu studies
- Islamic studies
- Jewish studies
- Religious studies
