= Geoffrey Khan =

British linguist

Professor Geoffrey Khan FBA
- Born: 1 February 1958 (age 68); Middlesbrough, England
- Education: School of Oriental and African Studies
- Scientific career
- Workplaces: University of Cambridge
- Thesis: Extraposition and Pronominal Agreement in Semitic Languages (1984)

Geoffrey Allan Khan FBA (born 1 February 1958) is a British linguist and philologist of Semitic languages. He has held the post of Regius Professor of Hebrew at the University of Cambridge since 2012. Considered one of the world's leading experts on Aramaic, he has published grammars for numerous Aramaic dialects (Note: of Barwari, Qaraqosh, Erbil, Sulaymaniyah and Halabja in Iraq; of Urmia and Sanandaj in Iran) and he leads the North-Eastern Neo-Aramaic Database. His other research has included Biblical Hebrew and medieval Arabic documents.

== Biography ==
Khan was born and raised in Middlesbrough in North Yorkshire. His mother was English whereas his father was South Asian of Iranian descent. His paternal grandfather was an Ismaili Muslim who married a Catholic, and Geoffrey's father went to a Jesuit school in Bombay. One of his paternal great-grandmothers was the daughter of a Welsh Wesleyan missionary, and Khan also has Native American ancestry. His parents separated when he was quite young, and he was raised by his mother and grandmother. He went to a "rough" comprehensive school where he suffered from racial abuse, and "took refuge in learning languages".

In 1984, he gained his PhD degree from the School of Oriental and African Studies with a thesis titled Extraposition and Pronominal Agreement in Semitic Languages. He became a researcher at the Cambridge University Library (1983–1993), working on the Cairo Genizah manuscripts. He then joined the University of Cambridge's Faculty of Asian and Middle Eastern Studies in 1993. In 2002, he was appointed Professor of Semitic Philology at Cambridge.

His main area of research is in linguistics studies of Hebrew and Aramaic while the focus of his Aramaic research is on North-Eastern Neo-Aramaic dialects.

He served as the chief editor of the Encyclopedia of Hebrew Language and Linguistics, which was published by Brill in 2013.

== Honours ==
- Fellow of the British Academy, 1998
- Honorary Fellow of the Academy of the Hebrew Language, 2011
- Lidzbarski Gold Medal for Semitic philology, 2004
- Fellow of Academia Europaea, 2014
- Honorary Member of the American Oriental Society, 2015
- Honorary doctorate, Hebrew University of Jerusalem, 2017
- Honorary doctorate, University of Uppsala, 2018

== Works ==
- Khan, Geoffrey (2002). The Neo-Aramaic Dialect of Qaraqosh. Leiden-Boston: Brill. ISBN 9789004348585.
- Khan, Geoffrey (2007). "Aramaic in the Medieval and Modern Periods" (PDF). Languages of Iraq: Ancient and Modern. Cambridge: The British School of Archaeology in Iraq. pp. 95–114.
- Khan, Geoffrey (2007). "The North-Eastern Neo-Aramaic Dialects". Journal of Semitic Studies. 52 (1): 1–20. doi:10.1093/jss/fgl034.
- Khan, Geoffrey (2007). "Remarks on the Historical Background of the Modern Assyrian Language". Journal of Assyrian Academic Studies. 21 (1): 1–6.
- Khan, Geoffrey (2008). The Neo-Aramaic Dialect of Barwar: Grammar. Vol. 1. Leiden-Boston: Brill. ISBN 9789004167650.
- Khan, Geoffrey (2008). "The Expression of Definiteness in North-Eastern Neo-Aramaic Dialects". Aramaic in Its Historical and Linguistic Setting. Wiesbaden: Harrassowitz Verlag. pp. 287–304. ISBN 9783447057875.
- Khan, Geoffrey (2009). "The Neo-Aramaic Dialects of Iraq". The Christian Heritage of Iraq. Piscataway, NJ: Gorgias Press. pp. 226–236.
- Khan, Geoffrey (2012). "North-Eastern Neo-Aramaic". The Semitic Languages: An International Handbook. Berlin-Boston: Walter de Gruyter. pp. 708–724. ISBN 9783110251586.
- Khan, Geoffrey (2012). "Remarks on the Dialects of the Assyrians in North-Western Iran". Journal of Assyrian Academic Studies. 26 (1–2): 1–14.
- Khan, Geoffrey (2012). "The Language of the Modern Assyrians: The North-Eastern Neo-Aramaic Dialect Group". The Assyrian Heritage: Threads of Continuity and Influence. Uppsala: Uppsala Universitet. pp. 173–199.
- Khan, Geoffrey (2014). "Phonological Emphasis in North-Eastern Neo-Aramaic". Carmillim, for the Study of Hebrew and Related Languages. 10 (2): 15–27.
- Khan, Geoffrey (2015). "Domains of Emphasis, Syllable Structure and Morphological Boundaries in the Christian Urmi Dialect of Neo-Aramaic". Neo-Aramaic and its Linguistic Context. Piscataway, NJ: Gorgias Press. pp. 145–161.
- Khan, Geoffrey (2015). "Causative Constructions in Neo-Aramaic (Christian Urmi Dialect)". Arabic and Semitic Linguistics Contextualized. Wiesbaden: Harrassowitz Verlag. pp. 506–530.
- Khan, Geoffrey (2016). The Neo-Aramaic Dialect of the Assyrian Christians of Urmi. Vol. 1. Leiden-Boston: Brill.
- Khan, Geoffrey (2016). The Neo-Aramaic Dialect of the Assyrian Christians of Urmi. Vol. 2. Leiden-Boston: Brill.
- Khan, Geoffrey (2016). The Neo-Aramaic Dialect of the Assyrian Christians of Urmi. Vol. 3. Leiden-Boston: Brill.
- Khan, Geoffrey (2016). The Neo-Aramaic Dialect of the Assyrian Christians of Urmi. Vol. 4. Leiden-Boston: Brill.
- Khan, Geoffrey (2016). "Remarks on Roots and Stems in the Christian Urmi Dialect of Neo-Aramaic". Babel und Bibel 9: Proceedings of the 6th Biennial Meeting of the International Association for Comparative Semitics and Other Studies. Winona Lake: Eisenbrauns. pp. 105–118.
- Khan, Geoffrey (2018). "Sound Symbolism in Neo-Aramaic". Near Eastern and Arabian Essays: Studies in Honour of John F. Healey. Oxford: Oxford University Press. pp. 197–214. ISBN 978-0-19-883106-8.
- Khan, Geoffrey (2018). "Remarks on the Historical Development and Syntax of the Copula in North-Eastern Neo-Aramaic Dialects". Aramaic Studies. 16 (2): 234–269. doi:10.1163/17455227-01602010. S2CID 195503300.
- Khan, Geoffrey (2018). "Jewish Neo-Aramaic in Kurdistan and Iran". Languages in Jewish Communities, Past and Present. Berlin-Boston: Walter de Gruyter. pp. 9–34.
- Khan, Geoffrey (2019). "The Neo-Aramaic Dialects of Eastern Anatolia and Northwestern Iran". The Languages and Linguistics of Western Asia: An Areal Perspective. Berlin-Boston: Walter de Gruyter. pp. 190–236. ISBN 9783110421743.
- Khan, Geoffrey (2019). "The Neo-Aramaic Dialects of Northern Iraq". The Languages and Linguistics of Western Asia: An Areal Perspective. Berlin-Boston: Walter de Gruyter. pp. 305–353. ISBN 9783110421743.
- Khan, Geoffrey (2019). "The Neo-Aramaic Dialects of Western Iran". The Languages and Linguistics of Western Asia: An Areal Perspective. Berlin-Boston: Walter de Gruyter. pp. 481–532. ISBN 9783110421743.
- Khan, Geoffrey (2019). "The Neo-Aramaic Dialects and Their Historical Background". The Syriac World. London: Routledge. pp. 266–289. ISBN 9781138899018.
- Khan, Geoffrey (2020). The Tiberian Pronunciation Tradition of Biblical Hebrew, Volume 1. Semitic Languages and Cultures. Vol. 1. Open Book Publishers. doi:10.11647/obp.0163. ISBN 978-1-78374-677-4.
- Hornkohl, Aaron; Khan, Geoffrey (1 June 2020). Studies in Semitic Vocalisation and Reading Traditions. Open Book Publishers. ISBN 978-1-78374-937-9.

== Notes ==
Academic offices
Preceded by Robert Gordon	Regius Professor of Hebrew (Cambridge); 2012–	Succeeded by incumbent
