= Yona Sabar =

Kurdistani Jewish scholar, linguist and researcher

- יוֹנָה צַבָּר
- Born: Yona Sabagha; 1938 (age 87–88); Zakho, Iraq
- Education: Hebrew University of Jerusalem (B.A. in Hebrew and Arabic, 1963), Yale University (Ph.D. in Near Eastern Languages and Literatures, 1970)
- Occupations: Scholar, linguist, researcher
- Years active: 1963–present
- Employer: University of California, Los Angeles
- Known for: Research on Jewish Neo-Aramaic and folklore of Kurdish Jews
- Notable work: The Folk Literature of the Kurdistani Jews, A Jewish Neo-Aramaic Dictionary
- Children: Ariel Sabar Ilan Sabar
- Awards: Subject of the National Book Critics Circle Award-winning memoir by his son, Ariel Sabar

Yona Sabar (Hebrew: יוֹנָה צַבָּר; born 1938 in Zakho, Iraq) is a Kurdistani Jewish scholar, linguist and researcher. He is professor emeritus of Hebrew at the University of California, Los Angeles. A native speaker of Northeastern Neo-Aramaic, Sabar has published more than 90 research articles about Jewish Neo-Aramaic and the folklore of the Jews of Kurdistan.

== Early life ==
A woman named Rakhma from Zakho (like Sabar) speaking Jewish Neo-Aramaic

Sabar was born in the town of Zakho in northern Iraq in 1938 as Yona Sabagha. He was the last known Jewish boy bar mitzvahed in Zakho. Due to the Arab-Israeli conflict of the 1950s, his family moved to Israel in 1951, when Sabar was 13 as a part of Operations Ezra and Nehemia.

Sabar initially struggled to adapt to Israel as a lower-class immigrant who spoke Aramaic. He worked in the National trade union Histadrut. After living in Israel, the family changed their surname to "Sabar" from the word for sabra, meaning prickly pear.

== Career ==
Sabar received a B.A. in Hebrew and Arabic from the Hebrew University of Jerusalem in 1963 and a Ph.D. in Near Eastern Languages and Literatures from Yale University in 1970. In 1972, he was hired as a professor of Hebrew and Aramaic at UCLA.

Sabar has written multiple articles for the Jewish Journal on the etymology of Hebrew words, such as the roots of "Mount Sinai".

Sabar served as the Aramaic dialect coach for the 2013 6x05 episode of True Blood "Fuck the Pain Away."

== My Father's Paradise ==
His immigrant journey from the hills of Kurdistan to the highways of Los Angeles is the subject of an award-winning memoir entitled My Father's Paradise: A Son's Search for his Jewish Past in Kurdish Iraq by his son, Ariel Sabar, an American author and journalist. Ariel Sabar's book on his father's life won the 2008 National Book Critics Circle Award for autobiography.

== Works ==
- The Folk Literature of the Kurdistani Jews: An Anthology, Yale University Press, 232 pp., 1982. ISBN 978-0-300-02698-6
- Sabar, Yona (2002). A Jewish Neo-Aramaic Dictionary: Dialects of Amidya, Dihok, Nerwa and Zakho, Northwestern Iraq. Wiesbaden: Harrassowitz Verlag. ISBN 9783447045575.
- Sabar, Yona (2003). "Aramaic, once an International Language, now on the Verge of Expiration: Are the Days of its Last Vestiges Numbered?". When Languages Collide: Perspectives on Language Conflict, Language Competition, and Language Coexistence. Columbus: Ohio State University Press. pp. 222–234. ISBN 9780814209134.
- Sabar, Yona (2009). "Mene Mene, Tekel uPharsin (Daniel 5:25): Are the Days of Jewish and Christian Neo-Aramaic Dialects Numbered?" (PDF). Journal of Assyrian Academic Studies. 23 (2): 6–17. Archived from the original (PDF) on 2020-07-15.
