= Edmon L. Gallagher =

American professor of Christian Scripture

- Born: June 22, 1979 (age 47)

Academic background
- Education: Freed-Hardeman University; Hebrew Union College-Jewish Institute of Religion

Academic work
- Discipline: Biblical studies
- Institutions: Heritage Christian University
- Notable works: The Biblical Canon Lists from Early Christianity
- Website: sanctushieronymus.blogspot.com

Edmon Louis "Ed" Gallagher (born June 22, 1979) is an American professor of Christian Scripture at Heritage Christian University in Florence, Alabama.

== Life ==
Gallagher is an associate minister at the Sherrod Ave. Church of Christ in Florence. He is married to Jodi and they have six children.

=== Education ===
In 2001 Gallagher earned a B.A. (2001) and a M.A. (2002) at the Freed-Hardeman University. In 2007 he earned a M.Phil in Hebraic and Cognate Languages. From 2010 he holds a Ph.D. in the History of Biblical Interpretation at the Hebrew Union College-Jewish Institute of Religion under the tutelage of Adam Kamesar.

== Bibliography ==
=== Books ===
- Gallagher, Edmon Louis (2012). Hebrew Scripture in Patristic Biblical Theory: Canon, Language, Text. Vigiliae Christianae, Supplements. Vol. 114. Brill. doi:10.1163/9789004228023. ISBN 978-90-04-22802-3.
- Gallagher, Edmon L.; Meade, John D. (2017). The Biblical Canon Lists from Early Christianity: Texts and Analysis. Oxford University Press. ISBN 9780198792499.

=== Articles ===
- Gallagher, Edmon L. (2014-09-22). "Cult Centralization in the Samaritan Pentateuch and the Origins of Deuteronomy". Vetus Testamentum. 64 (4). Brill. doi:10.1163/15685330-12341177.

== Sources ==
- HCU Staff. "Edmon L. Gallagher. Professor of Christian Scripture". Heritage Christian University.
- Thatcher, Tom; Keith, Chris; Person, Raymond F.; Stern, Elsie R., eds. (2017). The Dictionary of the Bible and Ancient Media. Bloomsbury Publishing. ISBN 9780567678379.
