= Eugen Prym =

German orientalist (1843–1913)

Eugen Prym (15 December 1843 in Düren – 6 May 1913 in Bonn) was a German orientalist, who specialized in Semitic languages, especially Arabic and Aramaic. He was the brother of mathematician Friedrich Prym (1841–1915), and is the great-great grandfather of historian, philosopher, and MacArthur Fellow Jacob Soll.

He studied comparative linguistics and Oriental languages at the universities of Berlin, Leipzig and Bonn, receiving his doctorate in 1868 with a thesis on the Islamic polymath Ibn Khallikan. As a student, his influences included Heinrich Leberecht Fleischer in Leipzig and Johann Gildemeister at the University of Bonn. From November 1868, with Albert Socin, he carried out linguistic research for one and a half years in the Middle East. Following his return to Bonn, he gave lectures in Semitic languages at the University, where in 1890 he attained a full professorship. In addition to Semitic languages, he also taught classes on Sanskrit and Persian.

== Selected works ==
- Der neu-aramäische Dialekt des Tur Abdin, 1881 – Neo-Aramaic dialect of Tur Abdin.
- Kurdische Sammlungen (2 volumes 1887–90, with Albert Socin) – Kurdish collections.
- Annales quos scripsit Abu Djafar Mohammed Ibn Djarir At-Tabari, (multi-volume, 1879–1901); edition of Al-Tabari; with Michael Jan de Goeje and others.
- Neuaramäische Märchen und andere Texte aus Malula in deutscher Übersetzung, hauptsächlich aus der Sammlung E. Prym's und A. Socin's, 1915 (with Albert Socin, pub. Gotthelf Bergsträsser) – Western Neo-Aramaic tales and other texts from Ma'lula.
