= Albert Socin =

Swiss orientalist (1844–1899)

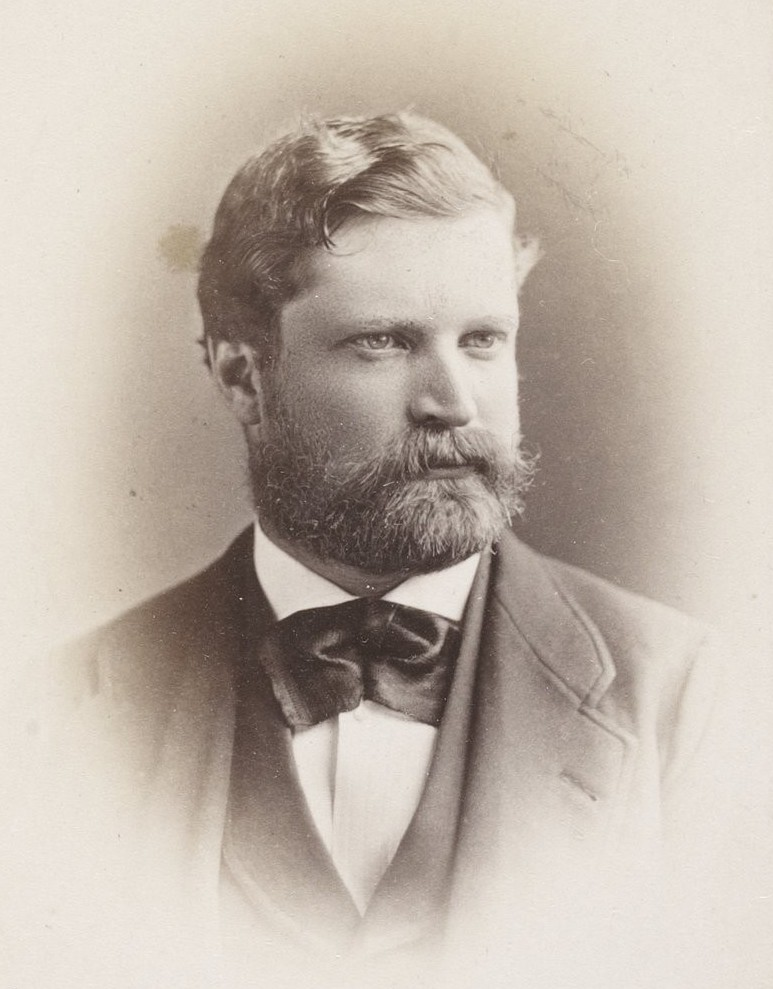
Albert Socin

Albert Socin (13 October 1844 in Basel – 24 June 1899 in Leipzig) was a Swiss orientalist, who specialized in the research of Neo-Aramaic, Kurdish and contemporary Arabic dialects. He also made contributions to the geography, archaeology, religion, art and literature of the Middle East.

He studied philology at the University of Basel and Oriental studies at the universities of Göttingen and Leipzig, receiving his habilitation for Oriental languages in 1871 at Basel. In 1873 he became an associate professor, then from 1876 to 1890 served as a full professor of Semitic languages at the University of Tübingen. From 1890 up until his death in 1899, he was a professor of Oriental languages at the University of Leipzig.

In 1868–70, with Eugen Prym, he carried out language research in the Levant and Iraq, then in 1873 returned to the Middle East on behalf of the Baedeker publishing firm. He was a founding member of the Deutschen Vereins zur Erforschung Palästinas ("German Society for the Exploration of Palestine").

== Selected works ==
- Socin, A. (1876). Palestine and Syria : handbook for travellers. Baedeker.
- Socin, A. (1879). "Alphabetisches Verzeichniss von Ortschaften des Paschalik Jerusalem". Zeitschrift des Deutschen Palästina-Vereins. 2: 135–163.
- Kurdische sammlungen (2 volumes 1887–90, with Eugen Prym) – Kurdish collections.
- Die Genesis : mit äusserer Unterscheidung der Quellenschriften (with Emil Friedrich Kautzsch), 1891 – The Genesis: with external distinction of documentary sources.
- Arabische Grammatik : Paradigmen, Literatur, Übungsstücke und Glossar (3rd edition, 1894) – Arabic grammar: paradigms, literature, studies and glossary.
- Diwan aus Centralarabien, 1900–01 – Diwan of central Arabia (collected, translated and explained by Socin, edited by Hans Stumme).
- Palestine and Syria with the chief routes through Mesopotamia and Babylonia; handbook for travellers; by Karl Baedeker. With 20 maps, 52 plans, and a panorama of Jerusalem (authors Albert Socin, John P. Peters, Immanuel Benzinger. First edition by Socin in 1875; the fourth English edition (1906) is based on the sixth German edition).
- Socin, Albert and Carl Brokelmann. Arabische Grammatik: Paradigmen, Literatur, Übungsstücke Und Glossar. Berlin: Reuther & Reichard, 1909.
- Socin, Albert (1912). Palestine and Syria, with routes through Mesopotamia and Babylonia and the island of Cyprus. Karl Baedeker.
- Neuaramäische Märchen und andere Texte aus Malula in deutscher Übersetzung, hauptsächlich aus der Sammlung E. Prym's und A. Socin's, 1915 (with Eugen Prym, pub. Gotthelf Bergsträsser) – Western Neo-Aramaic tales and other texts from Ma'lula.

== Maps from "Palestine and Syria with the chief routes through Mesopotamia and Babylonia". ==
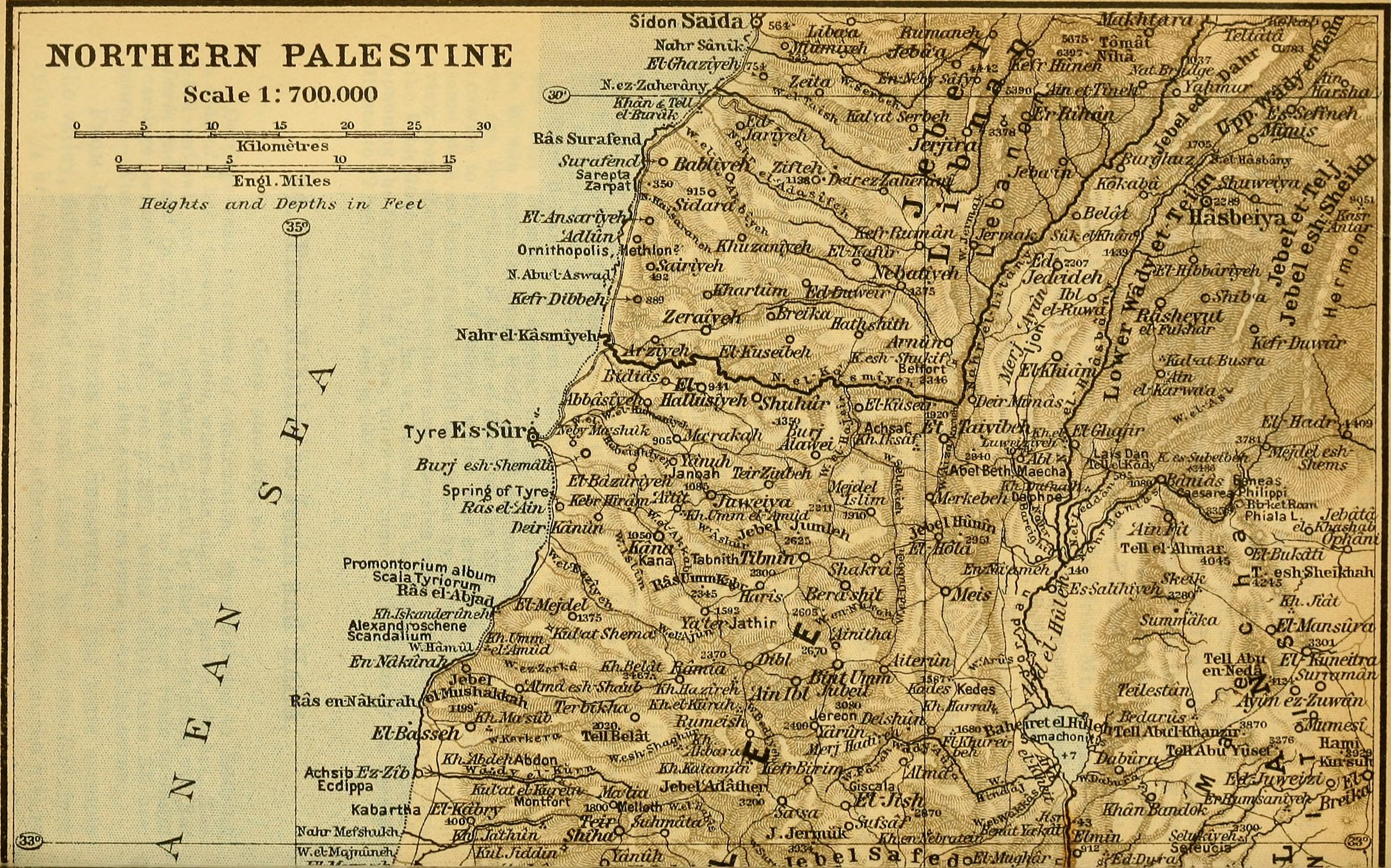
Northern Palestine

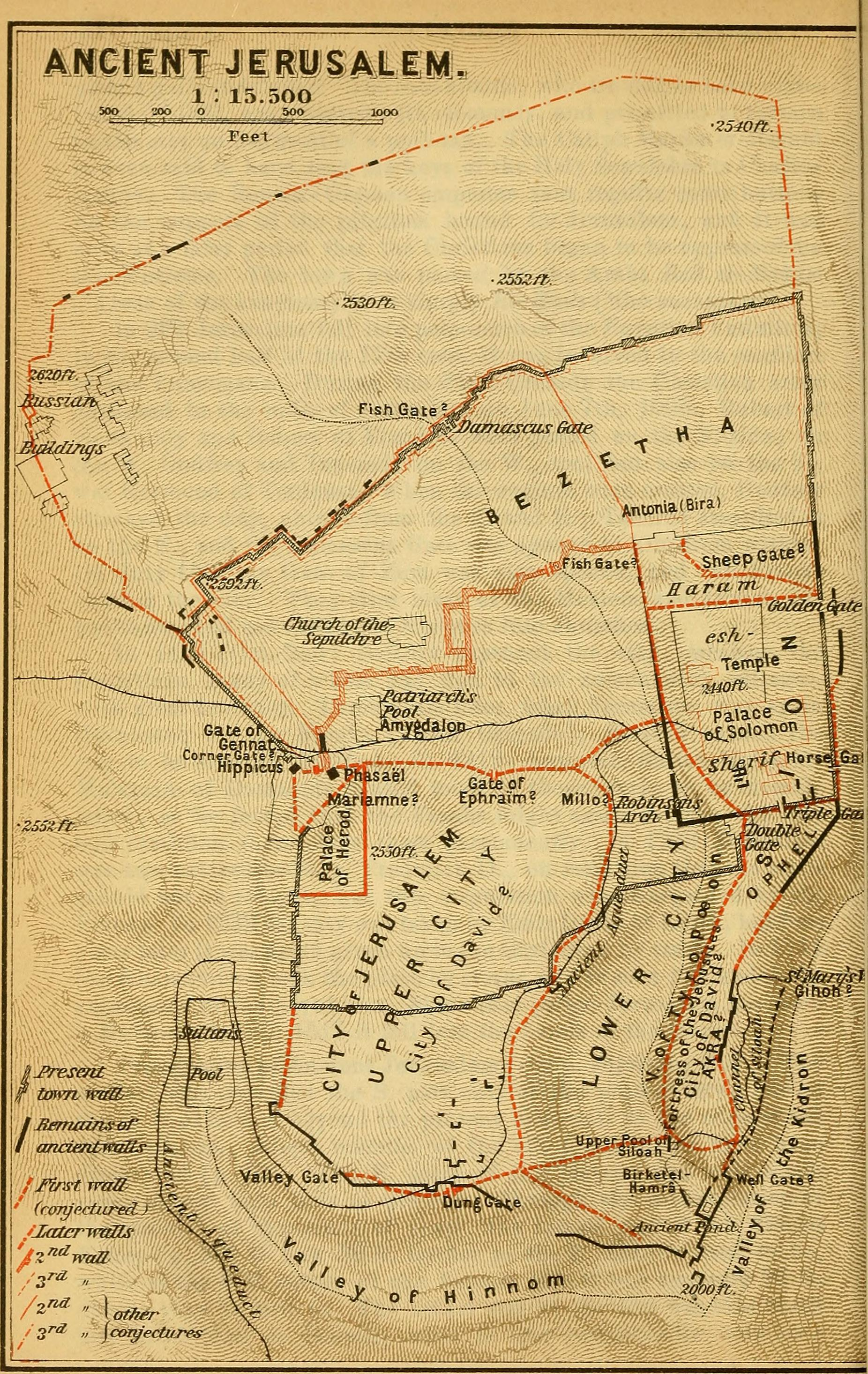
Ancient Jerusalem

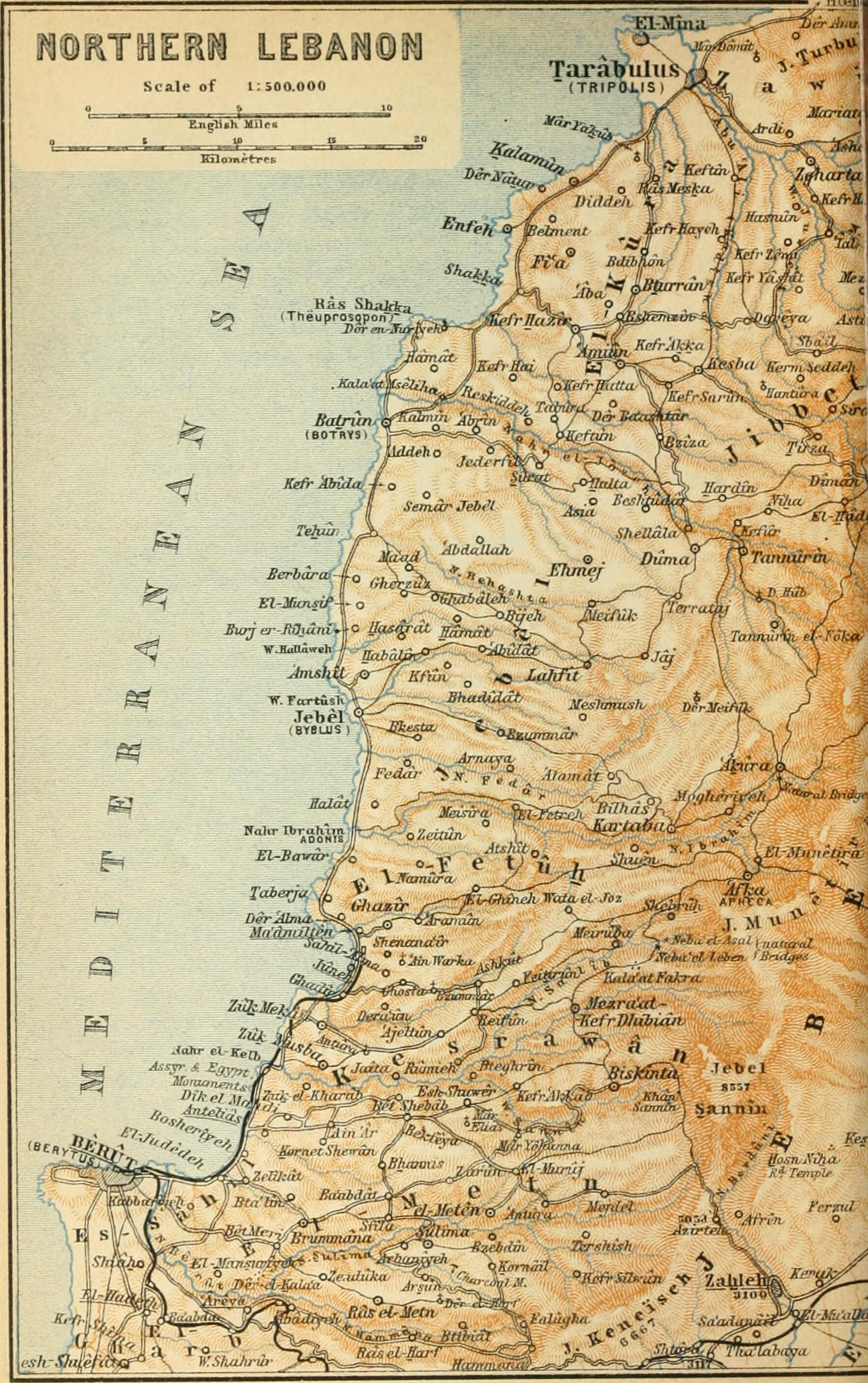
Northern Lebanon

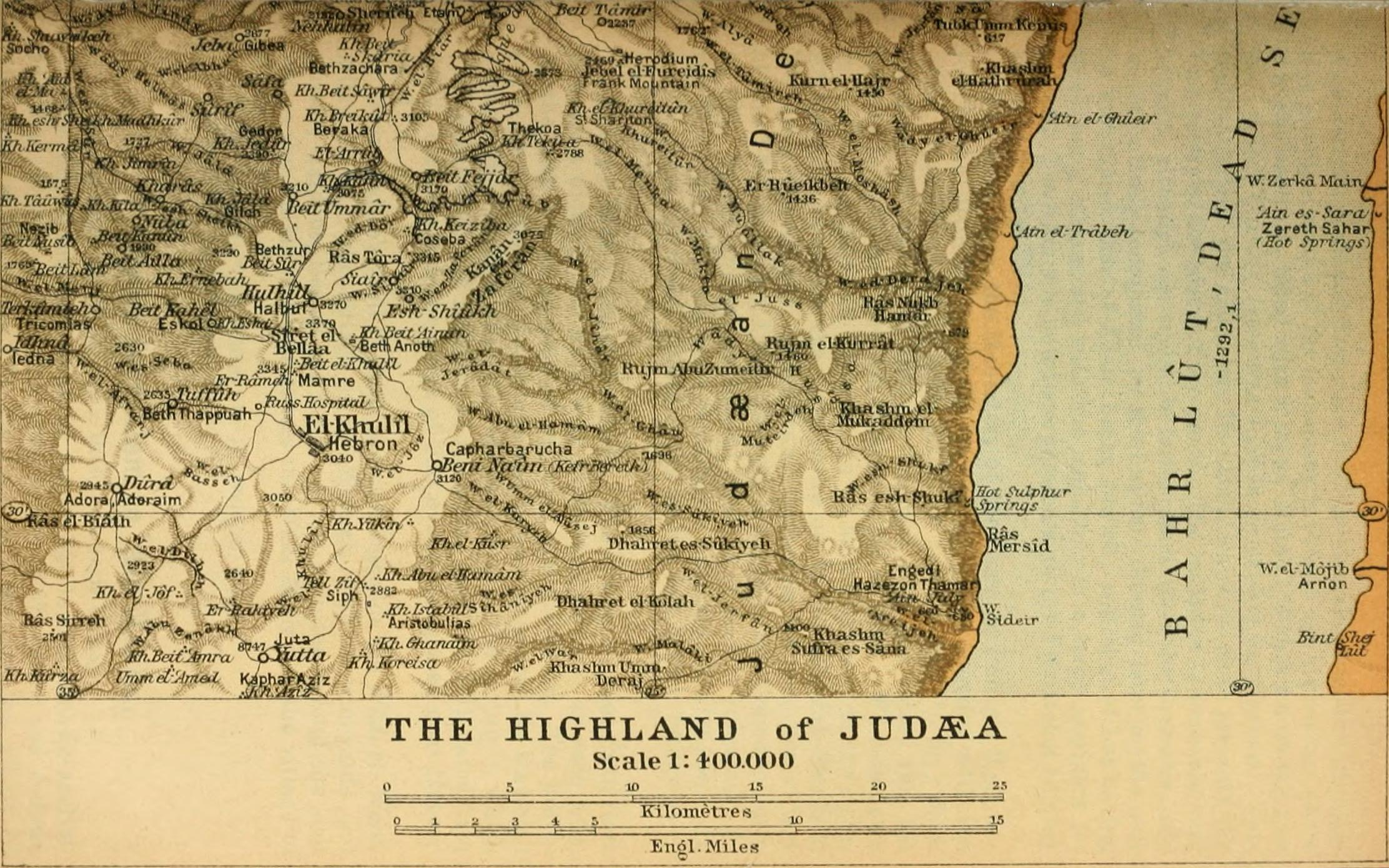
Highland of Judea
