= Iah (disambiguation) =

Iah is a god of the moon in ancient Egyptian religion.

Iah or IAH may also refer to:

- Iah (queen), a king's mother of ancient Egypt during the 11th dynasty
- George Bush Intercontinental Airport (IATA:IAH), an airport in Houston, Texas, United States
- International Association of Hydrogeologists, a scientific and educational organisation
- Workers International Relief, (German: Internationale Arbeiter-Hilfe), a Berlin-based organisation

== See also ==
- Jah (disambiguation)
- Yah (disambiguation)
