= Jehovah (disambiguation) =

Jehovah is a reading of the name of God in Abrahamic religions.

Jehovah may also refer to:

- Jehovah 1, an important character in the parody religion, Church of the SubGenius
- Jehovah complex, term used in Jungian analysis
- Jehovah Wanyonyi, a Kenyan mystic who claimed to be God
- Jehovah's Witnesses
- Assemblies Jehovah Shammah

== See also ==
- JAH (disambiguation)
- Tetragrammaton (disambiguation)
- Yahweh (disambiguation)
