= Jah (disambiguation) =

Jah is an abbreviated form of Jehovah, a name of God.

JAH or Jah may also refer to:

== Academic journals ==
- Journal of Aboriginal Health, a peer-reviewed journal
- The Journal of African History, a peer-reviewed journal
- Journal of Aging and Health, a medical journal
- The Journal of American History, the official academic journal of the Organization of American Historians

== Music ==
- XXXTentacion (1998–2018), often referred to as Jah (a shortening of Jahseh Onfroy), American rapper and singer-songwriter
- "Jah", a 2023 song by Libianca

== Politics ==
- Jamiat Ahle Hadith, a political and Islamic religious party of Pakistan

== See also ==
- IAH (disambiguation)
- Jehovah (disambiguation)
- Tetragrammaton (disambiguation)
- Yahweh (disambiguation)
