= Jehovist =

Jehovist may refer to:

- Jehovist or Yahwist, an adherent of Yahwism
- Jahwist, one of the four sources of the Pentateuch (Torah)
- Jehovist, a person who maintains that the vowel points of the Hebrew name of Jehovah are its proper vowels
- Yehowists, a Russian Christian new religious movement
- Jehovists, a term pejorative for Jehovah's Witnesses

== See also ==
- Jehovah (disambiguation)
- Yahwistic (disambiguation)
