= List of loanwords in Classical Syriac =

Loanwords in Classical Syriac entered the language throughout different periods in the history of Mesopotamia. The Alexandrian and Seleucid rule along with interaction with their fellow citizens of the Greco-Roman world of the Fertile Crescent resulted in the adoption of numerous Greek words. The majority of these were nouns relating to Roman administration, such as officials, military, and law.

The largest group of loanwords come from Greek and is followed by Iranian loans, although words from Sumerian, Akkadian, and Latin are also passed on in varying degrees. Several Hebrew loanwords exist (particularly religious terms). The Islamic Conquests changed the demographics of the empire and resulted in an influx of a new corpus of words from Arabic while life under the Seljuk, Ottoman, and Safavid empires introduced Turkic words to the language. Several loanwords in Classical Syriac are also partly taken or additionally rooted to other Semitic, Iranian, and Indo-European families, being rooted across various languages.

== Language isolates ==
=== Sumerian ===
Sumerian	Syriac	Pronunciation	Part of Speech	Meaning	Notes
𒂍𒆳 (E.KUR)	ܐܓܘܪܐ	aggura	noun	"pagan shrine, altar"	
𒀀𒂵𒄠 (agam)	ܐܓܡܐ	agma	noun	"meadow, swamp"	
𒂍𒋞 (addir)	ܐܓܪܐ	agra	noun	"hire, wages"	
𒌑𒊩 (usal)	ܐܘܣܠܐ	aosla	noun	"swamp"	
𒄑𒀠𒆷𒈝 (allanum)	ܐܝܠܢܐ	īlānā	noun	"tree, tree trunk"	
𒀀𒍪 (azu)	ܐܣܝܐ	asya	noun	"doctor (physician)"	
𒀀𒇉𒈦𒄘𒃼 (idigna)	ܕܩܠܬ	deqlāṯ	noun	"Tigris"	
𒂍𒃲 (E.GAL)	ܗܝܟܠܐ	haykla	noun	"palace, temple"	
𒀀𒇉𒌓𒄒𒉣 (buranun)	ܦܪܬ	prāṯ	noun	"Euphrates"	

== Semitic ==
=== Akkadian ===
Akkadian	Syriac	Part of Speech	Meaning	Notes
𒌚𒉈 (Abum)	ܐܒ	proper noun	"August"	
𒄧 (inbum)	ܐܒܐ	noun	"fruit"	
abūtu	ܐܒܘܬܐ	noun	"rule, plumbline of an architect; goad for scraping plowshares; duct work"	
abullu	ܐܒܘܠܐ	noun	"city gate; portico"	
agāru	ܐܓܪܐ	noun	"hire, wages"	
agurru	ܐܓܘܪܐ	noun	"kiln-fired brick or tile"	
Addaru	ܐܕܪ	proper noun	"March"	
ummānu	ܐܘܡܬܐ	noun	"nation"	
𒌝𒈪𒀀 (UM.MI.A)	ܐܘܡܢܐ	adjective/noun	"clever, skillful" "artisan, craftsman"	
𒌚𒄞 (Ayyaru)	ܐܝܪ	proper noun	"May"	
Ulūlu	ܐܝܠܘܠ	proper noun	"September"	
𒌵𒆠 (akkadûm)	ܐܟܕܝܐ	noun	"Akkadian bird"	
𒈣 (eleppum)	ܐܠܦܐ	noun	"ship, boat, gallery"	
arad ekalli	ܐܪܕܟܠܐ	noun	"architect, builder"	
arru	ܐܪܐ	noun	"decoy bird"	
𒅈𒂵𒌋𒌋𒉡 (argamannu)	ܐܪܓܘܢܐ	noun	"purple"	
𒌋𒈬 (U.MU /atūnu, utūnu/)	ܐܬܘܢܐ	noun	"oven, furnace"	
asītu	ܐܫܝܬܐ	noun	"wall, column"	
egubbu	ܓܝܒܐ	noun	"temple courtyard basin"	
muršānu	ܘܪܫܢܐ	noun	"wood dove, pigeon"	
zīmu	ܙܝܘܐ	noun	"beauty"	
ziqtu	ܙܩܬܐ	noun	"goad, rod"	
akukītu	ܟܘܟܝܬܐ	noun	"storm, whirlwind"	
Kislīmu	ܟܢܘܢ	proper noun	"December; January"	
lilītu	ܠܠܝܬܐ	noun	"lilith; female demon"	
aban gabî	ܡܓܒܝܐ	noun	"alum"	
amuriqānu	ܡܪܝܩܢܐ	noun	"jaundice"	
𒌚𒁇 (nissanum)	ܢܝܣܢ	proper noun	"April"	
Šabāṭu	ܫܒܛ	proper noun	"February"	
šaṭāru	ܫܛܪܐ	noun	"deed, document"	
Duʾūzu	ܬܡܘܙ	proper noun	"July"	
Tašrītu	ܬܫܪܝܢ	proper noun	"October; November"	

=== Ancient North Arabian ===
Ancient North Arabian	Syriac	Part of Speech	Meaning	Notes
𐪑𐪈𐪔𐪇	ܐܒܓܪ	proper noun	"Abgar" ("lame person")	

=== Old South Arabian ===
Ancient North Arabian	Syriac	Part of Speech	Meaning	Notes
𐩥𐩯𐩤	ܘܣܩܐ	noun	"burden, captive, servant"	

=== Arabic ===
Arabic	Syriac	Part of Speech	Meaning	Notes
بَغْل	ܒܓܠܐ	noun	"mule"	
بَغْلَة	ܒܓܠܬܐ	noun	"mule, hinny"	
بُومَة	ܒܘܡܐ	noun	"owl"	
بَقَّال	ܒܩܠܐ	noun	"vegetables"	
جُمَادَى	ܓܘܡܕܐ	noun	"Jumada", "Jumada" "audacity, importunity"	
ذُو الْحِجَّة	ܕܘܠܚܓܗ	noun	"Dhu al-Hijjah"	
ذو القعدة	ܕܘܠܩܥܕܗ	noun	"Dhu al-Qadah"	
دَرْب	ܕܪܒܐ	noun	"way, road"	
دَرَج	ܕܪܓܐ	noun	"stairway, step"	
هَجِين	ܗܓܝܢܐ	adjective	"half-breed", "bastard"	
وَزِير	ܘܙܝܪܐ	noun	"vizier"	
وَرِيد	ܘܪܝܕܐ	noun	"blood vessel, vein"	
وَرَن	ܘܪܢܐ	noun	"large lizard"	
زَعْفَرَان	ܙܥܦܪܢ	noun	"crocus, saffron"	
حَبّ	ܚܒܐ	noun	"grain"	
حُسْبَانَة	ܚܘܫܒܢܐ	noun	"small cushion"	
حَوْل	ܚܝܠܐ	noun	"army, force"	
حِلْس	ܚܠܣܐ	noun	"horsecloth, saddle"	
خَنْجَر	ܚܢܓܪܐ	noun	"dagger"	
طُنُب	ܛܘܢܒܐ	noun	"rope, cord, cordage"	
طِيز	ܛܝܙܐ	noun	"anus, buttocks"	
يَرْبُوع	ܝܪܒܘܥܐ	noun	"Jerboa"	
كُوع	ܟܘܥܐ	noun	"joint, limb"	
كِيمِيَاء	ܟܝܡܝܐ ,ܟܝܡܝܐܐ, ܟܝܡܝܢ	noun	"alchemy, chemistry"	
خِيَار	ܟܝܪܐ	noun	"cucumber"	
خَلِيفَة	ܚܠܝܦܗ, ܟܠܝܦܬܐ ,ܟܠܝܦܗ	noun	"caliph"	
اَلْكَعْبَة	ܟܥܒܬܐ	proper noun	"Kaaba"	
محرم	ܡܘܚܪܡ	noun	"Muharram"	
مَحْرَمَة	ܡܚܪܡܬܐ	noun	"mosquito net"	
مَيْدَان	ܡܝܕܐܢ	noun	"stadium, arena"	
مُسْلِمَة	ܡܫܠܡܢܝܬܐ	noun	"traitor", "Muslim"	
نَبِيذ	ܢܒܝܕܐ	noun	"date wine"	
نَجْم	ܢܓܡܐ	noun	"celestial body"	
نِمْس	ܢܡܣܐ	noun	"mongoose"	
سِلْف	ܣܘܠܦܐ	noun	"brother in-law"	
سِرْقِين	ܣܪܩܝܢܐ	noun	"excrement"	
عُود	ܥܘܕܐ	noun	"aloe, agarwood"	
عُرْف	ܥܘܪܦܐ	noun	"cockscomb"	
عَامِل	ܥܡܠܐ	noun	"labor", "prefect"	
فِجّ	ܦܓܐ	noun	"unripe fig", "henna flower"	
فَهْد	ܦܗܕܐ	noun	"panther"	
فَاغِرَة	ܦܥܪܐ	noun	"Zanthoxylum"	
فِتْنَة	ܦܬܢܐ	noun	"tumult, discord"	
صين	ܨܝܢ	proper noun	"China"	
صَنْدُوق	ܣܢܕܘܩܐ	noun	"box", "case"	
صَفَر	ܨܦܪ	noun	"Safar"	
اَلْقُرْآن	ܩܘܪܐܢ	proper noun	"Quran"	
قَطَّان	ܩܛܢܐ	noun	"cotton worker"	
قِطْعَة	ܩܛܥܐ	noun	"segment"	
قَائِد	ܩܝܕܐ	noun	"leader"	
قَالِب	ܩܠܒܐ	noun	"mold"	
قَلْعَة	ܩܠܥܐ	noun	"fortress, castle"	
رَبِيع	ܪܒܝܥ	noun	"Rabi' I", "Rabi II"	
رجب	ܪܓܒ	noun	"Rajab"	
رُبّ	ܪܘܒܐ	noun	"thickened juice", "honey"	
رِزْق	ܪܙܩܐ	noun	"daily supply"	
رِيح	ܪܝܚܐ	noun	"wind"	
رمضان	ܪܡܕܢ, ܪܡܨܐܢ, ܪܡܛܐܢ	noun	"Ramadan"	
رَسُول	ܪܣܘܠܐ	noun	"messenger"	
شَوّال	ܫܘܐܠ	proper noun	"Shawwal"	
شُغْل	ܫܘܓܠܐ	noun	"affair, business"	
شُرْطَة	ܫܘܪܛܐ, ܫܪܛܐ	noun	"guard, royal guard"	
سُرْم	ܫܘܪܡܐ	noun	"rectum"	
شِحْنَة	ܫܚܢܐ	noun	"prefect"	
شَيْخ	ܫܝܟ	noun	"sheik"	
سَنَاء	ܫܢܐ	noun	"subliminity"	
شعبان	ܫܲܥܒܵܐܢ	noun	"Sha'ban"	
تَمَاسِيح	ܬܡܣܝܚ	noun	"crocodile"	

=== Classical Mandaic ===
Classical Mandaic	Syriac	Part of Speech	Meaning	Notes
	ܩܘܕܐ	noun	"fetter, clog, bond, shackle"	
ࡓࡁࡉࡕࡀ	ܪܒܝܬܐ	noun	"ocean, sea"	
ࡔࡒࡀࡐ	ܫܩܱܦ	verb	"to strike, to beat; to contuse, to crush"	

=== Hebrew ===
Hebrew	Syriac	Part of Speech	Meaning	Notes
הוֹשַׁע־נָא	ܐܘܫܥܢܐ	noun; interjection	"hosanna"	
אֵל	ܐܝܠ	proper noun	"El, God"	
אֵפוֹד	ܐܦܘܕܐ	noun	"ephod"	
גִּיד הַנָּשֶׁה	ܓܢܫܝܐ	noun	"sciatic nerve"	
חֹמֶשׁ	ܚܘܡܫܐ	noun	"abdomen"	
יָבָם	ܝܒܡܐ	noun	"brother-in-law"	
יָדִיד	ܝܕܝܕܐ	adjective	"beloved"	
יהוה	ܝܗܘܗ	proper noun	"Yahweh"	
יוֹנָה	ܝܘܢܐ	noun	"dove"	
יֵצֶר	ܝܨܪܐ	noun	"desire, inclination"	
יְרִיעָה	ܝܪܝܥܬܐ	noun	"curtain"	
כוהן / כֹּהֵן	ܟܗܢܐ	noun	"priest"	
כְּרוּב	ܟܪܘܒܐ	noun	"cherub"	
לִוְיָתָן	ܠܘܝܬܢ, ܠܘܝܬܐܢ	proper noun	"Leviathan"	
מַבּוּל	ܡܡܘܠܐ	noun	"deluge, whirlpool"	
מְנַקִּית	ܡܢܝܩܝܬܐ	noun	"bowl, spoon"	
מָרוֹם	ܡܪܘܡܐ	noun	"height"	
מַתִּתְיָהוּ	ܡܬܝ	proper noun	"Matthew"	
נָבִיא	ܢܒܝܐ	noun	"prophet"	
סְדוֹם	ܣܕܘܡ	proper noun	"Sodom"	
שָׂטָן	ܣܛܢܐ	noun	"Satan, devil"	
סַנְחֵרִיב	ܣܢܚܪܝܒ	proper noun	"Sennacherib"	
שָׂרָה	ܣܪܐ	proper noun	"Sarah"	
עֵדָה	ܥܕܬܐ	noun	"church"	
עֲמוֹרָה	ܥܡܘܪܐ	proper noun	"Gomorrah"	
עֲצָרָה / עֲצֶרֶת	ܥܨܪܬܐ	noun	"religious festival", "sacrifice"	
קַב	ܩܒܐ	noun	"Cab"	
רֵיק	ܪܝܩܐ	noun	"empty, worthless"	
רָקִיעַ	ܪܩܝܥܐ	noun	"sky"	
שָׁמִיר	ܫܡܝܪܐ	noun	"flint, diamond"	

=== Biblical Hebrew ===
Biblical Hebrew	Syriac	Part of Speech	Meaning	Notes
אָמֵן	ܐܡܝܢ	adverb	"Amen"	
בְּהֵמוֹת	ܒܗܡܘܬ	noun	"behemoth"	
הֶבֶל	ܗܰܒܶܝܠ	proper noun	"Abel"	
הָמוֹן	ܗܡܢ	noun	"realm of the dead"	
יֹאשִׁיָּה	ܝܘܫܝܐ	proper noun	"Josiah"	
מִזְמוֹר	ܡܙܡܘܪܐ	noun	"psalm, hymn"	
מִיכָאֵל	ܡܺܝܟ݂ܳܐܝܶܠ	proper noun	"Michael"	
נַעֲמָן	ܢܥܡܢ	proper noun	"Naaman"	

== Iranian languages ==
Iranian	Syriac	Part of Speech	Meaning	Notes
	ܐܗܡܪܐܓܪ	noun	"accountant"	
ustan	ܐܘܣܬܢܐ	noun	"(Persian) court, crown estate"	
ezbarka (Note: The word is likely combined with the Old Armenian զուարակ, but details of its origin are uncertain)	ܐܙܒܪܟܐ	noun	"large ox, bull, buffalo"	
	ܐܣܦܝܕܟܐ	noun	"white lead"	
būrak	ܒܘܪܟܐ	noun	"borax"	
banda	ܒܢܕܐ	noun	"banner, standard"	
barza	ܒܪܙܐ	noun	"sown field"	
jôrâb	ܓܘܪܒܐ	noun	"sock, stocking"	
	ܓܙܐ	noun	"treasure"	
gâv-mêš	ܓܡܘܫܐ	noun	"buffalo bull"	
garza	ܓܪܣܐ	noun	"crushed grain" or "learning"	
daewa	ܕܝܘܐ	noun	"demon, devil"	
	ܙܝܘܓ	noun	"mercury (element)"	
	ܙܪܢܝܟܐ	noun	"arsenic"	
heshmita	ܚܫܡܝܬܐ	noun	"supper, dinner, banquet"	
	ܝܘܙܐ	noun	"cheetah, leopard, panther"	
qaba	ܩܒܝܬܐ	noun	"man's tunic, uppercoat, overgarment"	
	ܩܘܒܬܐ	noun	"vault, pavilion"	
kūz	ܩܘܙܐ	noun	"weasel, mongoose"	
murtak	ܡܪܬܟܐ	noun	"dross of silver, litharge"	
	ܢܘܗܕܪܐ	noun	"commander"	
papa	ܦܦܐ	proper noun	"Papa" (male given name) or "parrot"	

=== Northwestern Iranian languages ===
Northwestern Iranian	Syriac	Part of Speech	Meaning	Notes
zanax	ܙܢܩܐ	noun	"chin"	

=== Middle Iranian languages ===
Middle Iranian	Syriac	Part of Speech	Meaning	Notes
	ܐܒܙܪܐ	noun	"attachment (on a device)"	
āβzan	ܐܘܙܢܐ	noun	"basin"	
ačār-	ܐܨܪܐ	noun	"spices"	
	ܕܪܓܘܫܬܐ	noun	"litter, bed"	
dārṣīnī	ܕܪܨܝܢܝ	noun	"cinnamon"	
	ܙܢܓܒܝܠ, ܙܢܓܒܝܪ, ܙܝܢܓܒܝܪ, ܙܢܓܒܠܐ, ܙܢܓܝܒܪ, ܙܝܢܓܒܪ	noun	"ginger"	
	ܟܘܬܐ	noun	"food preserved in vinegar"	
nôl	ܢܘܠܐ	noun	"weaver's beam"	
kond	ܩܘܕܐ, ܩܘܛܐ	noun	"shackle, chain"	
šēn	ܫܝܢܐ	noun	"peace", "cultivated land"	
šīša	ܫܝܫܬܐ	noun	"vase, bottle"	

=== Parthian ===
Parthian	Syriac	Part of Speech	Meaning	Notes
	ܒܝܣܦܢܐ	noun	"mounted courier"	
	ܒܝܣܦܩܐ	noun	"courier's wagon"	
	ܒܪܙܢܩܐ	noun	"greave, bracelet"	
daxš	ܕܚܫܐ	noun	"attendant, lictor"	
ward	ܘܪܕܐ	noun	"rose"	
	ܙܢܩܐ	noun	"long boot"	
𐭕𐭓𐭐𐭍𐭎	ܛܪܦܢܣܐ	noun	"corselet, chain mail"	
𐫖𐫡𐫃	ܡܪܓܐ	noun	"meadow"	
sfsyr	ܣܦܣܝܪܐ	noun	"sword, dagger"	
plync	ܦܠܙܐ	noun	"brass, bronze"	
𐫢𐫡𐫀𐫄	ܫܪܓܐ	noun	"lamp"	

=== Old Iranian languages ===
Old Iranian	Syriac	Part of Speech	Meaning	Notes
gawnah	ܓܘܢܐ	noun	"color", "appearance", "species"	
zaina	ܙܝܢܐ	noun	"weapons, arms"	

=== Classical Persian ===
Classical Persian	Syriac	Part of Speech	Meaning	Notes
زُرْنَاپَا	ܙܪܢܦܐ, ܙܪܝܦܐ	noun	"giraffe"	
لوبیا	ܠܘܒܝܐ	noun	"black-eyed pea"	

=== Old Persian ===
Old Persian	Syriac	Part of Speech	Meaning	Notes
ganza-	ܓܙܐ	noun	"treasure"	
ganzabarah	ܓܙܒܪܐ, ܓܝܙܒܪܐ	noun	"treasurer"	
𐎭𐎼𐎴𐎹 (d-r-n-y)	ܕܪܝܟܘܢܐ, ܕܪܟܘܢܐ	noun	"daric"	
𐏀𐎴 (zana-)	ܙܢܐ	noun	"kind, type"	
𐎶𐎦𐏁 (maguš)	ܡܓܘܫܐ	noun	"Magi"	
nibrāšti-	ܢܒܪܫܬܐ	noun	"candelabrum, lightstand"	
𐎴𐎡𐏀𐎣 (naizaka-)	ܢܝܙܟܐ	noun	"spear", "meteor"	
	ܢܝܫܐ	noun	"sign", "goal"	
batak-	ܦܛܩܐ	noun	"bowl, flask"	
	ܩܛܐ	noun	"plumbline"	

=== Persian ===
Persian	Syriac	Part of Speech	Meaning	Notes
آزار	ܐܕܪܐ	noun	"leishmaniasis"	
دهل	ܕܗܘܠ	noun	"davul"	
خنجر (Note: Also borrowed from Arabic خَنْجَر)	ܚܢܓܪܐ	noun	"dagger"	
لاجورد	ܠܐܙܘܪܕ	noun	"lapis lazuli"	
سپستان	ܣܓܦܣܬܢ	noun	"sebesten"	
پولاد	ܦܘܠܕ	noun	"steel"	

== Indo-European ==
=== Greek ===
Early Greek loans which were administrative in nature became obscure as society changed, although words adopted from translations of Christian and philosophical texts outlived the former and survive to the current day. Many loanwords originally from Greek were philosophical and took the plural stem, and the current-day Syriac language remains rich in these loanwords.

Greek	Syriac	Part of Speech	Meaning	Notes
	ܐܰܢܰܢܩܺܝܐ	adjective		
ἀράχνη	ܐܪܟܐܢܐ	noun	"spider"	
αἱρετικός	ܗܪܛܝܩܐ	noun	"heretic"	
τεταρταίος	ܛܗܛܐܪܛܗܘ ,ܛܗܛܪܛܗܐ ,ܛܗܛܐܪܛܗܐܘܣ	noun	"quartan"	
ὀροβάγχη	ܐܘܪܒܟܝܢ	noun	"broomrape"	
ἄγνος	ܐܓܢܘܣ	noun	"agnus"	
κέγχρος	ܩܢܟܢܘܢ	noun	"a gem"	
	ܦܪܦܝܪܝܛܝܣ	noun	"porphyrite"	
	ܣܪܕܘܢ	noun	"sard, a kind of stone"	
γαλακτίτης	ܓܠܐܩܛܝܛܝܣ	noun	"a type of milky stone"	
ἀπόφασις	ܐܦܘܦܣܝܣ	noun	"judgement"	
συλλογισμός	ܣܘܠܘܓܣܡܐ	noun	"syllogism"	
	ܦܪܘܛܣܝܣ	noun	"premise, proposition, preposition"	
ὕπατοι	ܐܘܦܛܝܢ	noun	"highest musical string"	
κιθάρα	ܩܝܬܪܐ	noun	"harp, lute"	
βάσις	ܒܣܣ	noun	"base, basis"	
	ܩܘܒܘܣ	noun	"cube'	
ἀμμωνιακόν	ܐܡܘܢܝܩܘܢ	noun	"gum ammoniac"	
ἀνδροδάμας	ܐܢܕܪܘܕܘܡܘܣ	noun	"arsenical pyrites"	
ἄσβεστος	ܐܣܒܣܛܘܢ	noun	"asbestos"	
ἀφρόνιτρον	ܐܦܘܢܝܛܪܘܢ	noun	"sodium carbonate"	
ἀρσενικόν	ܐܪܣܘܢܝܩܘܢ	noun	"arsenic sulfide, yellow ointment"	
	ܡܓܢܝܣܝܐ	noun	"magnesium"	
μολυβδήνη	mwlbdynˀ	noun	"galena"	
μίσυ	mysw	noun	"shoemaker's vitriol"	
νίτρων	nyṭrwn	noun	"nitre"	
σηρικόν	sryqwn	noun	"red ink, red lead"	
ψιμύθιον	psymtyn	noun	"white lead"	
κιννάβαρις	ܩܝܢܒܪܝܣ	noun	"cinnabar"	
	ܩܠܡܝܐ	noun	"cadmia (ore of zinc)"	
κρήτη	ܩܪܝܛ	noun	"chalk"	
ῥητίνη	ܪܛܝܢܐ	noun	"resin"	
όξεῖα	ܐܘܟܣܝܐ	noun	"sharp things (grammatical)"	
σχῆμα	ܐܣܟܡܐ	noun	"character, shape, form"	
ἄρθρον	ܐܪܬܪܘܢ	noun	"particle"	
ζεῦγος	ܙܘܓܐ	noun	"pair, conjugation, name of an accent"	
τάξις	ܛܟܣܐ	noun	"order, military company, apparatus"	
ἄργολας	ܐܪܓܘܠܐ	noun	"a type of snake"	

=== Ancient Greek ===
Ancient Greek	Syriac	Part of Speech	Meaning	Notes
γένος	ܓܢܣܐ	noun	genus	

=== Byzantine Greek ===
Byzantine Greek	Syriac	Part of Speech	Meaning	Notes
σπεκουλάτωρ	ܐܣܦܘܩܠܛܪܐ	noun	"speculator, "bodyguard", "lictor, executioner"	
κούπα	ܟܘܒܐ	noun	"cup, goblet, vessel"	
σκάλα	ܣܩܠܐ	noun	"ladder", "stirrup"	
σακελλάριος	ܣܩܠܪܐ, ܣܩܠܐܪܐ	noun	"treasurer, bursar"	

=== Koine Greek ===
Koine Greek	Syriac	Part of Speech	Meaning	Notes
Σολομών	ܫܠܝܡܘܢ	proper noun	"Solomon"	

=== Latin ===
Latin loans appear to have been largely transmitted to Syriac via Greek. This is evident based on the Syriac orthography which demonstrates it was borrowed from the Greek form.

Latin	Syriac	Part of Speech	Meaning	Notes
arena	ܐܪܐܢܐ	noun	"arena"	
comitatus	ܩܝܡܛܛܘܢ	noun	"retinue"	
curopalata	ܩܘܪܐܦܠܛܝܣ	noun	"prefect of the palace"	
caldarium	ܩܪܕܠܐ	noun	"pot"	
candela	ܩܢܕܝܠܐ	noun	"lamp, torch"	
carrarius	ܩܪܪܐ	noun	"driver"	
carruca	ܩܪܘܟܐ	noun	"chariot"	
cella	ܩܠܐ	noun	"cell"	
dinarius	ܕܝܢܪܐ	noun	"gold dinarius"	
numerus	ܢܘܡܪܐ	noun	"number"	
pāgānus	ܦܓܐܢܐ	noun	"villager, commoner"	
palatium	ܦܠܛܝܢ	noun	"palace"	
sacra	ܣܩܪܐ	noun	"letter, report"	
tālāre	ܛܠܪܐ ,ܛܐܠܪܐ	noun	"sandal"	
vēlum	ܘܝܠܐ	noun	"veil, curtain, cover"	

=== Old Armenian ===
Old Armenian	Syriac	Part of Speech	Meaning	Notes
կատապան	ܩܛܐܒܢ	noun	"governor of the Armenians"	
թագաւոր	ܬܟܘܘܪ	noun	"king of the Armenians"	

== Turkic ==
Turkic	Syriac	Part of Speech	Meaning	Notes
qan	ܟܐܢ	noun	"khan, ruler, emperor"	
*šāw	ܫܐܘ	noun	"bill, banknote, paper money"	
yarliǵ	ܝܪܠܝܟ	noun	"decree, mandate, yarligh"	

=== Ottoman Turkish ===
Ottoman Turkish	Syriac	Part of Speech	Meaning	Notes
زورنا	ܙܘܪܢܐ	noun	"pipe, flute, zurna"	
توتون	ܬܬܘܢ	noun	"tobacco"	

== Other ==
=== Old Georgian ===
Old Georgian	Syriac	Part of Speech	Meaning	Notes
შოლტი	ܫܘܛܐ	noun	"whip, lash, scourge"	

=== Portuguese ===
Portuguese	Syriac	Part of Speech	Meaning	Notes
commodore	ܟܘܡܕܘܪ	noun	"commander"	

=== Chinese ===
Chinese	Syriac	Part of Speech	Meaning	Notes
牌子	ܦܝܙܐ	noun	"paiza, gerege"	

== See also ==
- List of loanwords in Assyrian Neo-Aramaic
- Classical Syriac

== Bibliography ==
- Brockelmann, Carl (1995) [1928]. "Lexicon Syriacum" (2nd ed.).
- Hillers, Del. "COMPREHENSIVE ARAMAIC LEXICON PROJECT". COMPREHENSIVE ARAMAIC LEXICON PROJECT. Cincinnati, USA: Hebrew Union College.
- Smith, Robert Payne (1903). A Compendious Syriac Dictionary (PDF). Oxford University Press. ISBN 9781725206427.
- Ciancaglini, Claudia A. (2006). "SYRIAC LANGUAGE i. IRANIAN LOANWORDS IN SYRIAC". Encyclopaedia Iranica.
