= Yahwistic =

Yahwistic may refer to:

- Named after Yahweh; see Theophory in the Bible § Yah theophory
- Relating to Yahwism, a religion in ancient Israel and Judah
- Relating to the Jahwist, a source of the Torah

== See also ==
- Jehovist (disambiguation)
- Yahweh (disambiguation)
