= Pentangle =

Pentangle may refer to:

- Pentagon, a five-sided polygon
- Pentagram, a five-pointed star drawn with five straight strokes
- Pentangle (band), a British folk rock band
  - The Pentangle (album), a 1968 album by Pentangle
- Miss Pentangle, a character from The Worst Witch
- Pentangle Puzzles, a former manufacturer and distributor of mechanical puzzles

== See also ==
- Pentacle (disambiguation)
- Pentagram (disambiguation)
