= Tetragram =

Tetragram generally refers to any group of four letters, but more specifically it may refer to:

- Tetragraph, a sequence of four letters used to represent a single sound, or a combination of sounds, that do not necessarily correspond to the individual values of the letters
- Tetragrammaton, the four-letter Hebrew-language theonym יהוה (transliterated as YHWH or YHVH), the name of God in the Hebrew Bible
- Complete quadrilateral, a system of geometric objects consisting of any four points in a plane, no three of which are on a common line, and of the six lines connecting the six pairs of points
- Tetragraph (Chinese: 方塊字; fāngkuàizì), Chinese characters written on graph paper
- A symbol composed of four lines in the Taixuanjing
- A degenerate star polygon, usually represented as a compound of two digons

== See also ==
- , including multiple scientific names
- Tetragrammaton (disambiguation)
