= Pentagram (disambiguation) =

A pentagram is the shape of a five-pointed star drawn with five straight strokes.

Pentagram may also refer to:

- Pentagram (design studio), a graphic design studio
- Pentagram (esports), a Japanese professional esports team
- Pentagram (video game), a 1986 video game in the Sabre Man series
- Pentagramm, the German title of The First Power (1990), an American horror movie
- Pentagram, a children's novel series by Anthony Horowitz
- The pentagram map, a geometrical construction defined for polygons
- "Pentagram" (Raised by Wolves), a 2020 television episode
- A staff, a set of five horizontal lines used in western musical notation, occasionally referred to as a pentagram

== Music ==
- Staff (music), a set of five horizontal lines upon which notes are placed in written music notation.

=== Bands ===
- Pentagram (band), an American doom metal band
- Pentagram (Indian band), an Indian rock band started in 1993
- Pentagram Chile, a thrash/death metal band started in 1985
- Mezarkabul, a Turkish metal band also known as Pentagram

=== Albums ===
- Pentagram (Gorgoroth album), released in 1994
- Pentagram (Mezarkabul album), released in 1990
- Pentagram (Pentagram album), an album by the Chilean band
- Relentless (Pentagram album), an album initially released under the name Pentagram by the American band

=== Songs ===
- "Pentagram", a song by Cake from the 1994 album Motorcade of Generosity
- "Pentagram", a song by Possessed from the 1985 album Seven Churches
- "Pentagram", a song by Prefuse 73 from the 2003 album One Word Extinguisher

== See also ==
- , including multiple scientific names
- Pentacle (disambiguation)
- Pentagrammaton (disambiguation)
- Pentangle (disambiguation)
