= List of loanwords in Assyrian Neo-Aramaic =

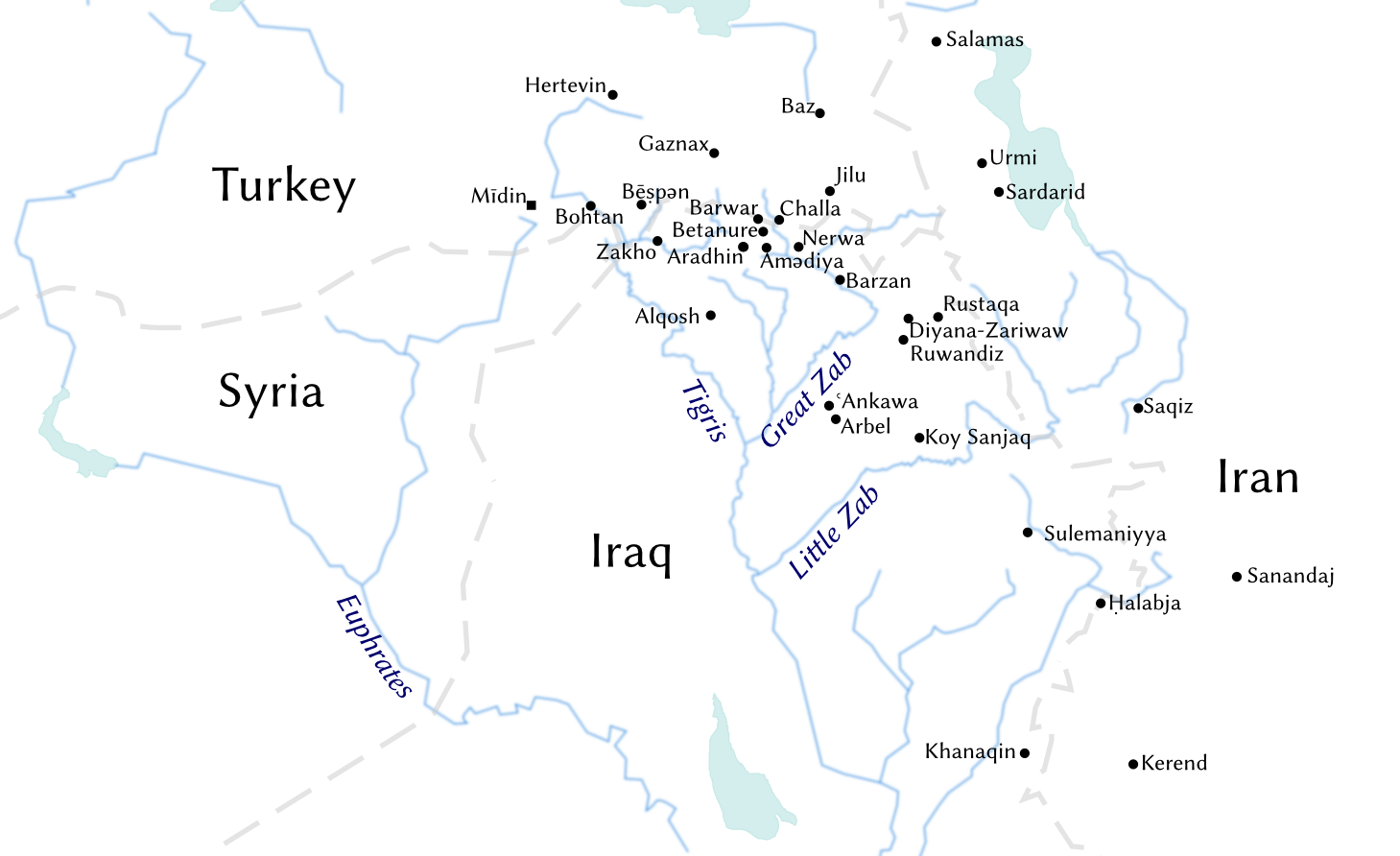
Villages where varieties of North-Eastern Neo-Aramaic are or have been spoken.

Loanwords in Assyrian Neo-Aramaic came about mostly due to the contact between Assyrian people and Arabs, Persians, Kurds and Turks in modern history, and can also be found in the other dialects spoken by the Assyrian people such as Turoyo. Assyrian is one of the few languages where most of its foreign words come from a different language family (in this case, Indo-European).

Unlike other Neo-Aramaic languages, Assyrian has an extensive number of latterly introduced Iranian loanwords. Depending on the dialect, Arabic loanwords are also reasonably present. Some Turkish loanwords are Turkified words that are of Arabic origin. To note, some of the loanwords are revised (or "Assyrianized") and therefore would sound somewhat different to the original word. Furthermore, some loanwords may also have a slightly different meaning from the original language.

== List ==
Below is a list of loanwords in Assyrian Neo-Aramaic, separated into sections based on the source language.

Notes:

- The source language itself may have borrowed the word from another language. These are noted in the "notes" sections.
- Vowels are typically "long" in an open syllable and "short" in a closed syllable; exceptions are noted by macrons on long syllables and breves on short ones.
- Stress typically falls on the penultimate syllable (exceptions are noted by acute accents). Monosyllabic words are also typically stressed.
- Geminated consonants are represented by a doubled letter.
- On transliteration:
  - ʾ represents a plain glottal stop: [ʔ].
  - ʿ represents a pharyngealized glottal stop: [ʔˤ].
  - ḥ represents a voiceless pharyngeal fricative: [ħ].
  - ġ represents a voiced velar fricative: [ɣ].
  - x represents a voiceless velar fricative: [x] or a voiceless uvular fricative: [χ].
  - q represents a voiceless uvular stop: [q].
  - ḳ represents an unaspirated voiceless velar stop: [k˭].
  - ṗ represents an unaspirated voiceless bilabial stop: [p˭].
  - ṣ represents a pharyngealized voiceless alveolar fricative: [sˤ].
  - š represents a voiceless postalveolar fricative: [ʃ].
  - ž represents a voiced postalveolar fricative: [ʒ].
  - ṯ represents a voiceless dental fricative: [θ].
  - ṭ represents a pharyngealized voiceless alveolar plosive: [tˤ].
  - j represents a voiced postalveolar affricate: [d͡ʒ].
  - č represents a plain voiceless postalveolar affricate: [t͡ʃ].
  - č̣ represents a pharyngealized voiceless postalveolar affricate: [t͡ʃˤ].

=== Arabic ===
Assyrian Word	Original Word	Part of Speech	Meaning	Notes	Classical Syriac equivalent	
Assyrian Word	Original Word	Part of Speech	Meaning	Notes	Transliteration	Spelling
ʿáskari	عَسْكَرِيّ	noun	soldier	Middle Persian loanword.	pālḥā	ܦܠܚܐ
ʿaskariya	عَسْكَرِيَّة	noun	military		gaysā	ܓܝܣܐ
ʾalasás	عَلَى الأَسَاس	adverb	as if; basically; allegedly	Some speakers.	šəʾīlāʾīṯ	ܫܐܝܠܐܝܬ
bas	بس	conjunction; adverb	but; only	Persian loanword. Some speakers.	ʾellā	ܐܠܐ
buri	بُورِي	noun	water pipe	Colloquial Iraqi Arabic.	zamrūrā	ܙܡܪܘܪܐ
dunye, dunya	دُنْيَا	noun	world		ʿālmā	ܥܠܡܐ
fundiq	فُنْدُق	noun	hotel	Ancient Greek loanword.	puttəqā	ܦܘܬܩܐ
ġarī́b	غريب	adjective	strange	Some speakers.	nūḵrāyā	ܢܘܟܪܝܐ
ġassala	غَسَّالَة	noun	washing machine			
ḥukma, xukma	حُكُومَة	noun	government		məḏabbərānūṯā	ܡܕܒܪܢܘܬܐ
ʾishā́l	إِسْهَال	noun	diarrhea	Some speakers.	šərāytā	ܫܪܝܬܐ
jizdán(a)	جزدان	noun	wallet		tarmālā	ܬܪܡܠܐ
majbur	مُجْبَر	adjective	forced, obliged		rəḇīṣā	ܪܒܝܨܐ
maymun	مَيْمُون	noun	monkey		qōp̄ā	ܩܘܦܐ
mŭḥami	مُحَامِي	noun	lawyer	Some speakers.	sāfrā	ܣܦܪܐ
mustašfa	مُسْتَشْفًى	noun	hospital		bêṯ kərīhē	ܒܝܬ ܟܪ̈ܝܗܐ
qăṣitt	قَصْد	noun	story, tale	Cf. Kurdish qesd.	tūnnāyā	ܬܘܢܝܐ
qiṣṣa		noun	forehead		bêṯ gəḇīnē	ܒܝܬ ܓܒܝܢ̈ܐ
ṣādra	صَدْر	noun	chest (anatomy)		ḥaḏyā	ܚܕܝܐ
ṣāḥ, ṣāx	صِحَّة	noun	health		ḥūlmānā	ܚܘܠܡܢܐ
ṣāḥḥi	صِحِّيّ	adjective	healthy		ḥūlmānāyā	ܚܘܠܡܢܝܐ
sijin	سِجْن	noun	jail; prison	Some speakers.	bêṯ ʾăsīrē	ܒܝܬ ܐܣܝܪ̈ܐ
ṯallaja	ثَلَّاجَة	noun	refrigerator	Some speakers.		
ṭiyara	طَيَّارَة	noun	aeroplane			
ʾuti		noun	clothes iron	Turkic loanword.		
yālla	ياالله	interjection	hurry up; let's go, come on	Some speakers.	baʿəḡal	ܒܥܓܠ

=== Persian ===
Assyrian Word	Original Word	Part of Speech	Meaning	Notes	Classical Syriac equivalent	
Assyrian Word	Original Word	Part of Speech	Meaning	Notes	Transliteration	Spelling
biš, buš	بیش	adverb	more		yattīr	ܝܬܝܪ
čamča	چمچه	noun	spoon		tarwāḏā	ܬܪܘܕܐ
čangal	چنگال	noun	fork		mašləyā	ܡܫܠܝܐ
čanta, janta	چنته	noun	purse; backpack		kīsā	ܟܝܣܐ
čarikk	چارک	noun	quarter, fourth		rūḇʿā	ܪܘܒܥܐ
darde	درد	noun	sorrow, pain		kēḇā	ܟܐܒܐ
darmana	درمان	noun	medicine, drug	Also borrowed into Classical Syriac.	sammā, darmānā	ܕܪܡܢܐ, ܣܡܐ
ʾerzan	ارزان	adjective	cheap, inexpensive		zəʿōr dəmayyā	ܙܥܘܪ ܕܡܝܐ
gĕran, gran, ʾagran	گران	adjective	expensive		saggī dəmayyā	ܣܓܝ ܕܡܝܐ
halbatte, halbat	البته	interjection; adverb	of course; naturally			
ham	هم	adverb	also		ʾāp̄	ܐܦ
hič	هیچ	determiner	no, none; nothing		lā; lā meddem	ܠܐ; ܠܐ ܡܕܡ
mēs	میز	noun	table		pāṯūrā	ܦܬܘܪܐ
parda	پرده	noun	curtain		prāsā, pirsā	ܦܪܣܐ
penjar(a)	پنجره	noun	window		kawwəṯā	ܟܘܬܐ
rang(a)	رنگ	noun	colour		ṣeḇʿā	ܨܒܥܐ
razi	راضی	adjective	satisfied, content	Arabic loanword.	raʿyā	ܪܥܝܐ
sabab	سبب	noun; conjunction	reason; because	Arabic loanword.	ʿelləṯā	ܥܠܬܐ
sanā́y, ʾasanā́y, hasanā́y	آسان	adjective	easy		pəšīqā	ܦܫܝܩܐ
tambal	تنبل	adjective	lazy		ḥəḇannānā	ܚܒܢܢܐ
xyara	خیار	noun	cucumber	Also borrowed into Classical Syriac.	ḵəyārā	ܟܝܪܐ
zahmat, zamit	زحمت	noun; adjective	trouble, difficulty; troublesome, difficult	Arabic loanword.	qašyā	ܩܫܝܐ
zarda	زرد	noun; adjective	yellow; yellowish	Some speakers.	šāʿūṯā; šāʿūṯānāyā	ܫܥܘܬܐ; ܫܥܘܬܢܝܐ

=== Kurdish ===
Assyrian Word	Original Word	Part of Speech	Meaning	Notes	Classical Syriac equivalent	
Assyrian Word	Original Word	Part of Speech	Meaning	Notes	Transliteration	Spelling
č̣aṗṗe, č̣aṗle	çep	noun	left		semmālā	ܣܡܠܐ
čŭ	çuh	determiner	no; not	Some speakers.	lā	ܠܐ
hawar	hewar	noun	aid		ʿūḏrānā	ܥܘܕܪܢܐ
hiwi	hêvî	noun	hope		saḇrā	ܣܒܪܐ
jamikka	cêmik	noun	twin	Cognate with Latin geminus, French jumeau, Portuguese gêmeo.	tāmā	ܬܐܡܐ
ḳuṗṗala	kopal	noun	staff, cane	Cf. Persian کوپال.	šaḇṭā	ܫܒܛܐ
mra(z)zole		verb	lecturing, scolding	Arabic loanword.	gəʿar	ܓܥܪ
qonya		noun	drain; well		bālōʿtā; bērā	ܒܠܘܥܬܐ; ܒܐܪܐ
zăra	zer	noun; adjective	yellow; yellowish	Some speakers.	šāʿūṯā; šāʿūṯānāyā	ܫܥܘܬܐ; ܫܥܘܬܢܝܐ

=== Turkish ===
Assyrian Word	Original Word		Part of Speech	Meaning	Notes	Classical Syriac equivalent	
Assyrian Word	Modern	Ottoman	Part of Speech	Meaning	Notes	Transliteration	Spelling
belki, balkit	belki	بلکه	adverb	maybe	From Persian balke (بلکه, "but").	kəḇar	ܟܒܪ
čakuč	çekiç	چكیچ	noun	hammer	From Persian čakoš (چکش, "hammer").	marzap̄tā, ʾarzap̄tā	ܡܪܙܦܬܐ, ܐܪܙܦܬܐ
dabanja	tabanca	طبانجه	noun	pistol, gun			
dūs, dus	düz	دوز	adjective	straight, flat; correct		tərīṣā	ܬܪܝܨܐ
gami	gemi		noun	boat, ship		ʾelpā, səp̄ī[n]tā	ܐܠܦܐ, ܣܦܝܢܬܐ
hazir	hazır	حاضر	adjective	ready	From Arabic ḥāḍir (حَاضِر, "present").	ʿəṯīḏā	ܥܬܝܕܐ
kismet	kısmet	قسمت	noun	fate	From Arabic qisma (قِسْمَة, "division").	gaddā	ܓܕܐ
pežgir	peşkir	پیشگیر	noun	towel	From Persian pišgir (پیشگیر).	šūšippā, šōšippā	ܫܘܫܦܐ
rahat	rahat	راحت	adjective	comfortable	From Arabic rāḥa (رَاحَة, "relaxation").	šalyā	ܫܠܝܐ
tammiz, tammis	temiz	تمیز	adjective	clean, tidy	From Arabic tamyīz (تَمْيِيز, "refinement").	daḵyā	ܕܟܝܐ
tōs, taws	toz	توز	noun	dust		ʾaḇqā	ܐܒܩܐ
zengin	zengin	زنگين	adjective	rich, wealthy	From Persian sangin (سنگين, "heavy").	ʿattīrā	ܥܬܝܪܐ

=== Other ===
These foreign words are borrowed from European languages:

Assyrian Word	Original Word	Part of Speech	Meaning	Notes	Classical Syriac equivalent	
Assyrian Word	Original Word	Part of Speech	Meaning	Notes	Transliteration	Spelling
ʾatmabel, ʾatnabel	English, French: automobile	noun	automobile, car	Classical Syriac equivalent is a neologism.	rāḏāytā	ܪܕܝܬܐ
benzin, benzil	German: Benzin	noun	petrol/gasoline			
batri	French: batterie, English: battery	noun	battery		baṭrīṯā	ܒܛܪܝܬܐ
bāy	English: bye	interjection	bye		pōš ba-šəlāmā	ܦܘܫ ܒܫܠܡܐ
bira	Italian: birra, from Latin: bibere	noun	beer		pezzā	ܦܙܐ
bomba	English: bomb, French: bombe	noun	bomb	From Ancient Greek bómbos (βόμβος).		
glās	English: glass	noun	cup (not necessarily made of glass)		kāsā	ܟܣܐ
ha(l)lo	English: hello	interjection	hello, greetings		šəlāmā	ܫܠܡܐ
lori	English: lorry	noun	lorry/truck			
mašina	Russian: mašína (маши́на)	noun	train; automobile	Meaning differs depending on the speaker, dialect and/or context. Ultimately from Ancient Greek mēkhanḗ (μηχανή).	qṭārā	ܩܛܪܐ
mčayyoke	English: check	verb	checking, inspecting	The noun Old French eschec, from medieval Latin scaccus, via Arabic from Persian šāh (شاه, "king").	bəḏaq	ܒܕܩ
pakit(a)	English: packet	noun	packet			
stōp	English: stove	noun	stove; heater		təp̄ayyā, təp̄āyā	ܬܦܝܐ
stumka, ʾisṭumka	Ancient Greek: stómakhos (στόμαχος)	noun	stomach	Also borrowed into Classical Syriac. Cognate with English stomach.	karsā, ʾesṭōmka	ܟܪܣܐ, ܐܣܛܘܡܟܐ
tĭlifón	English: telephone	noun	telephone	Coined from Ancient Greek têle (τῆλε, “afar”) and phōnḗ (φωνή, “voice, sound”).	rūḥqqālā	ܪܘܚܩܩܠܐ
tilvizyón	English: television	noun	television	Coined from Ancient Greek têle (τῆλε, “afar”) and Latin vīsiō ("vision, seeing"). Classical Syriac equivalent is a neologism.	pərās ḥezwā	ܦܪܣ ܚܙܘܐ

== See also ==
- Chaldean Neo-Aramaic, a language (also considered a dialect of Assyrian) which also uses some of these loanwords.
- List of English words of Semitic origin
- List of loanwords in Classical Syriac
- Hybrid word
- Morphology
- Romanization of Syriac
