= Pentacle (disambiguation) =

A pentacle is an amulet used in magical evocation, generally made of parchment, paper or metal (although it can be of other materials), on which the symbol of a spirit or energy being evoked is drawn.

Pentacle may also refer to:

- Suit of pentacles, a tarot card suit in the Minor Arcana
- Pentacle (magazine), a Neopagan magazine
- The Pentacle, a short-lived DC Comics supervillain team

== See also ==
- Pentagram (disambiguation)
- Pentangle (disambiguation)
