= Pentagrammaton =

Pentagrammaton may refer to:

- Yahshuah, an allegorical form of the Hebrew name of Jesus
- Pentagrammaton (album), a 2010 album by Enthroned
- Pentagrammaton, the working title of the 1984 album Bathory by Bathory
- Pentagrammaton, a 2020 album by Ofermod
- Pentagrammaton Records, an American record label by Twin Temple

== See also ==
- Pentagram (disambiguation)
- Tetragrammaton (disambiguation)
