= Syriac language =

Dialect of Middle Aramaic

Syriac
- Classical Syriac; Edessan Aramaic
- ܠܫܢܐ ܣܘܪܝܝܐ
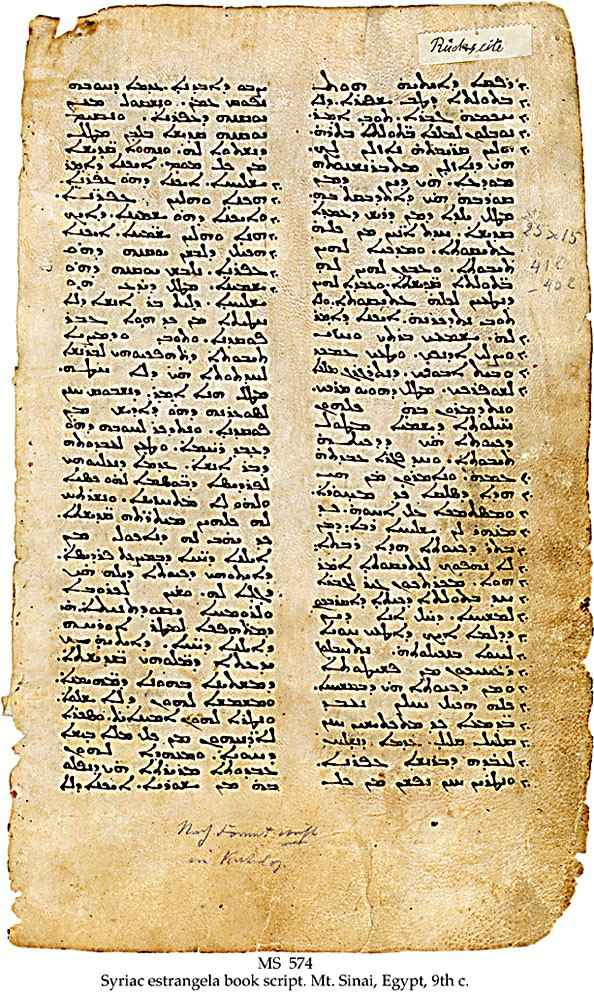
- 9th-century manuscript in Estrangela script
- Pronunciation: [lɛʃˈʃɑːnɑː surˈjɑːjɑː]
- Native to: Upper Mesopotamia (Syria, Iraq, Turkey, Iran)
- Region: Fertile Crescent (northern Iraq, northwestern Iran, Syria, southeastern Turkey, Lebanon, Israel, Sinai), Eastern Arabia (Bahrain, Kuwait, Qatar)
- Era: 1st century AD; declined as a vernacular language after the 13th century; still in liturgical use
- Language family: Afro-Asiatic: Semitic; West Semitic; Central Semitic; Northwest Semitic; Aramaic; Eastern Aramaic; Syriac
- Early forms: Proto-Afroasiatic: Proto-Semitic; Old Aramaic; Middle Aramaic; Eastern Middle Aramaic
- Dialects: West-Syriac; East-Syriac
- Writing system: Syriac alphabet

Official status
- Official language in: Nineveh Plains
- Recognised minority language in: Syria; Turkey

Language codes
- ISO 639-2: syc
- ISO 639-3: syc
- Glottolog: clas1252

The Syriac language (/ˈsɪr.i.æk/, SIRR-ee-ak; Classical Syriac: ܠܫܢܐ ܣܘܪܝܝܐ, romanized: Leššānā Suryāyā), (Note: Classical, unvocalized spelling; with Eastern Syriac vowels: ܠܸܫܵܢܵܐ ܣܘܼܪܝܵܝܵܐ; with Western Syriac vowels: ܠܶܫܳ݁ܢܳܐ ܣܽܘܪܝܳܝܳܐ.) also known natively in its spoken form in early Syriac literature as Edessan (Urhāyā), the Mesopotamian language (Nahrāyā) and Aramaic (Aramāyā), is an Eastern Middle Aramaic dialect based on the Aramaic dialect of Edessa. Classical Syriac is the academic term used to refer to the dialect's literary usage and standardization, distinguishing it from other Aramaic dialects also known as 'Syriac', 'Assyrian', or 'Syrian'. In its West-Syriac tradition, Classical Syriac is often known as leššōnō kṯoḇonōyō (lit. 'the written language or the book language') or simply kṯoḇonōyō, or kṯowonōyō, while in its East-Syriac tradition, it is known as leššānā ʔatīqā (lit. 'the old language') or saprāyā (lit. 'scribal or literary'). It emerged during the first century AD from a local Eastern Aramaic dialect that was spoken in the ancient Neo-Assyrian kingdom and region of Osroene, centered in the city of Edessa (Urhai). During the Early Christian period, it became the main literary language of various Aramaic-speaking Christian communities in the historical regions of Ancient Syria, Assyria and throughout the Near East. As a liturgical language of Syriac Christianity, it gained a prominent role among Eastern Christian communities that used both Eastern Syriac and Western Syriac rites. Following the spread of Syriac Christianity, it also became a liturgical language of eastern Christian communities as far as India and China. It flourished from the 4th to the 8th century, and continued to have an important role during the next centuries, but by the end of the Middle Ages it was gradually reduced to liturgical use, since the role of vernacular language among its native largely Assyrian and Aramean speakers was overtaken by several Neo-Aramaic languages.

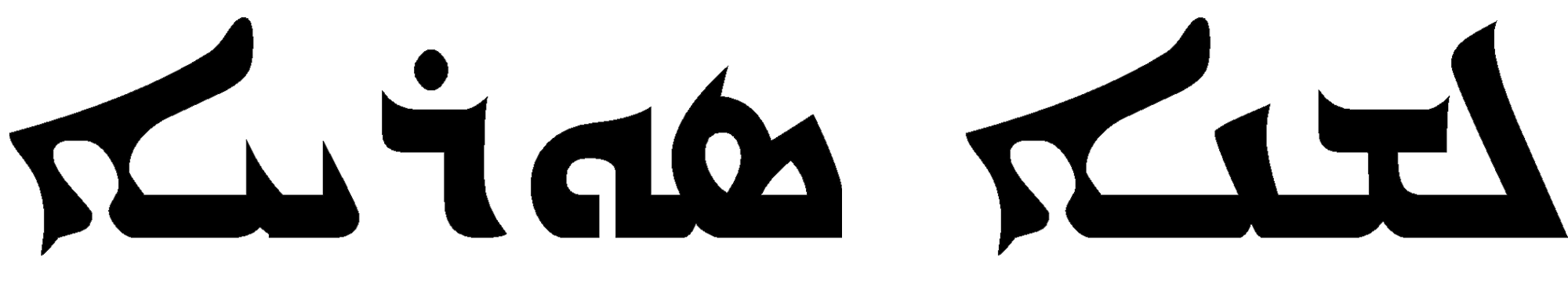
The phrase ܠܫܢܐ ܣܘܪܝܝܐ (Leššānā Sūryāyā / Lešono Suryoyo, "Syriac language") in the Estrangela script.

Classical Syriac is written in the Syriac alphabet, a derivation of the Aramaic alphabet. The language is preserved in a large body of Syriac literature, which comprises roughly 90% of the extant Aramaic literature. Along with Greek and Latin, Syriac became one of the three most important languages of Early Christianity. Already from the first and second centuries AD, the mostly Assyrian inhabitants of the region of Osroene began to embrace Christianity, and by the third and fourth centuries, local Edessan Aramaic language became the vehicle of the specific Christian culture that came to be known as Syriac Christianity. Because of theological differences, Syriac-speaking Christians diverged during the 5th century into the Church of the East that followed the East Syriac Rite under Persian rule, and the Syriac Orthodox Church that followed the West Syriac Rite under Byzantine rule.

A man reciting a prayer in Syriac, then translating it into English

As a liturgical language of Syriac Christianity, Classical Syriac spread throughout Asia as far as the Southwestern India (Malabar Coast), and Eastern China, and became the medium of communication and cultural dissemination for the later Arabs, and (to a lesser extent) the other peoples of Parthian and Sasanian empires. Primarily a Christian medium of expression, Syriac had a fundamental cultural and literary influence on the development of Arabic, which largely replaced it during the later medieval period.

The Lord's Prayer written in Syriac.

Syriac remains the sacred language of Syriac Christianity to this day. It is used as the liturgical language of several denominations, like those who follow the East Syriac Rite, including the Assyrian Church of the East and its offshoots, the Ancient Church of the East, and the Chaldean Catholic Church, the Syro-Malabar Catholic Church, and the Assyrian Pentecostal Church, and also those who follow the West Syriac Rite, including: Syriac Orthodox Church, the Syriac Catholic Church, the Maronite Catholic Church, the Malankara Mar Thoma Syrian Church, the Malankara Orthodox Syrian Church and the Syro-Malankara Catholic Church. Classical Syriac was originally the liturgical language of the Syriac Melkites within the Greek Orthodox Patriarchate of Antioch in Antioch and parts of ancient Syria. The Syriac Melkites changed their church's West Syriac Rite to that of Constantinople in the 9th–11th centuries, necessitating new translations of all their Syriac liturgical books.

== Name ==
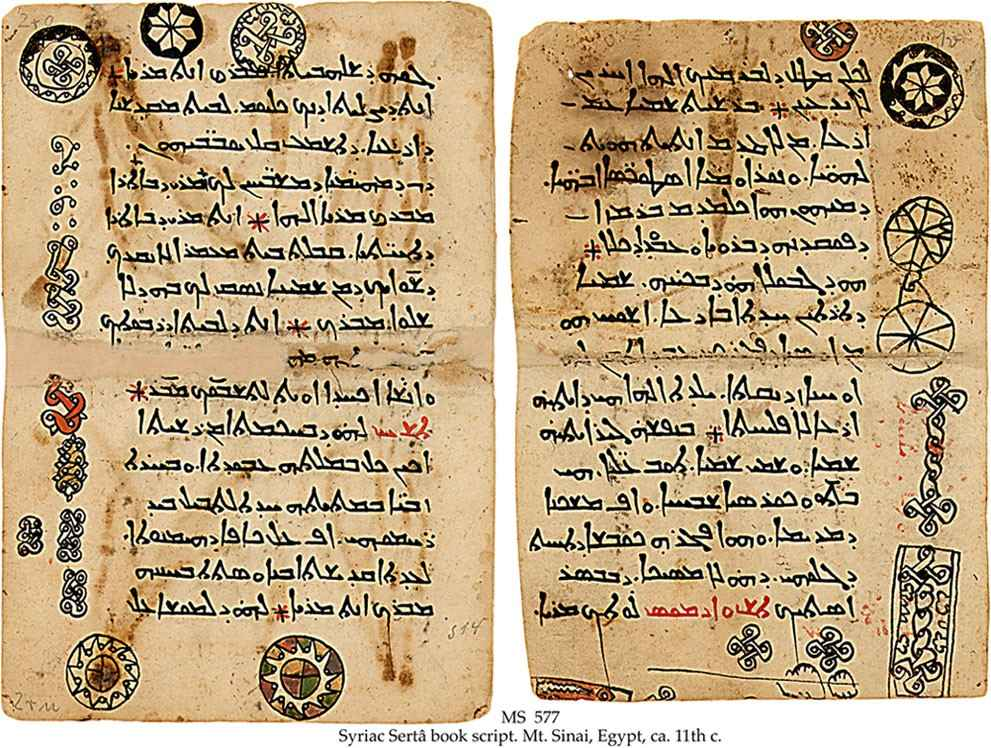
An 11th-century Syriac manuscript

Etymologically, the Name of Syria is originally an Iron Age derivation of Assyria and until the Seleucid Empire it referred solely to the historical Assyria which encompassed modern Northern Iraq, Northeast Syria and the area of Southeast Turkey north of these areas. In the English language, the term "Syriac" is used as a glottonym (language name) designating a specific variant of the Aramaic language in relation to its regional origin in northeastern parts of Ancient Syria, around Edessa, which lay outside of the provincial borders of Roman Syria. Since Aramaic was used by various Middle Eastern peoples such as Assyrians, Mandaeans, Arameans and Judeans, having several variants (dialects), this specific dialect that originated in northeastern Syria became known under its regional (Syrian/Syriac) designation (Suryaya).

In English scholarly literature, the term "Syriac" is preferred over the alternative form "Syrian", since the latter is much more polysemic and commonly relates to Syria in general. That distinction is used in English as a convention and does not exist on the ancient endonymic level. Several compound terms like "Syriac Aramaic", "Syrian Aramaic" or "Syro-Aramaic" are also used, thus emphasizing both the Aramaic nature of the language and its Syrian/Syriac regional origin.

=== Endonyms and exonyms ===
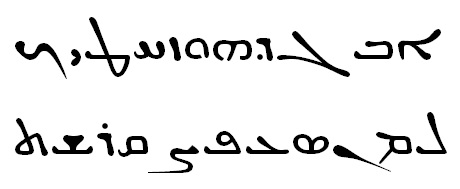
The Syriac alphabet

Early native speakers and writers used several endonymic terms as designations for their language. In addition to common endonym (native name) for the Aramaic language (Aramaya), another endonymic term was also used, designating more specifically the local Edessan dialect, known as Urhaya, a term derived directly from the native Assyrian name for the city of Edessa (Urhay). Among similar endonymic names with regional connotations, term Nahraya was also used. It was derived from choronym (regional name) Bet-Nahrain, an Aramaic name for Mesopotamia.

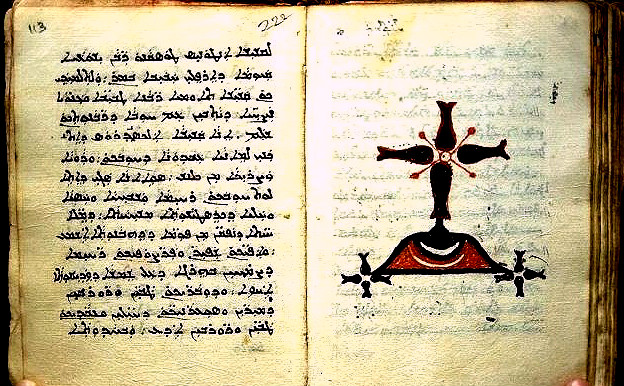
Late Syriac text, written in Madnhāyā script, from Thrissur, Kerala, India, 1799

Original endonymic (native) designations, for Aramaic more broadly (Aramaya), and Edessan Aramaic in particular (Urhaya), were later (starting from the 5th century) accompanied by another term, exonymic (foreign) in origin: Suryaya (Syrian/Syriac), adopted under the influence of a long-standing Greek custom of referring to speakers of Aramaic, be they Assyrian or Aramean as Syrians. Among ancient Greeks, term "Syrian language" was used as a common designation for Aramaic language, and such usage was also reflected in Aramaic, by subsequent (acquired) use of the term "Suryaya" as the most preferred synonym for "Aramaya" (Aramaic).

Practice of interchangeable naming (Aramaya, Urhaya, Nahraya, and Suryaya) persisted for centuries, in common use and also in works of various prominent writers. One of those who used various terms was theologian Jacob of Edessa (d. 708), who was referring to the language as "Syrian or Aramaic" (Suryāyā awkēt Ārāmāyā), and also as Urhāyā, when referring to Edessan Aramaic, or Naḥrāyā when pointing to the region of Bet-Nahrain (Aramaic term for Mesopotamia).

Plurality of terms among native speakers (ārāmāyā, urhāyā, naḥrāyā, and suryāyā) was not reflected in Greek and Latin terminology, which preferred the Syrian/Syriac designation, and the same preference was adopted by later scholars, with one important distinction: in western scholarly use, Syrian/Syriac label was subsequently reduced from the original Greek designation for the Aramaic language to a more specific (narrower) designation for Edessan Aramaic language, that in its literary and liturgical form came to be known as Classical Syriac. That reduction resulted in the creation of a specific field of Syriac studies, within Aramaic studies.

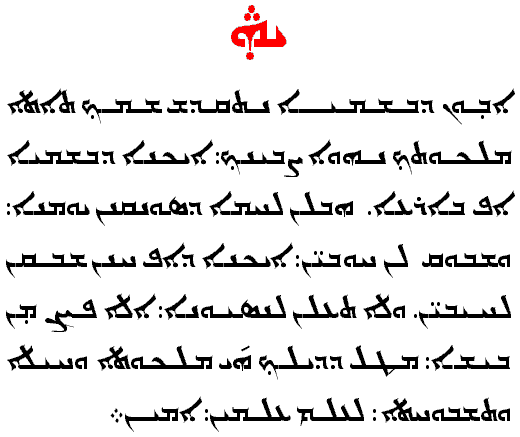
The Lord's Prayer in Syriac language

Preference of early scholars towards the use of the Syrian/Syriac label was also relied upon its notable use as an alternative designation for Aramaic language in the "Cave of Treasures", long held to be the 4th century work of an authoritative writer and revered Christian saint Ephrem of Edessa (d. 373), who was thus believed to be proponent of various linguistic notions and tendencies expressed in the mentioned work. Since modern scholarly analyses have shown that the work in question was written much later (c. 600) by an unknown author, several questions had to be reexamined. In regard to the scope and usage of Syrian/Syriac labels in linguistic terminology, some modern scholars have noted that diversity of Aramaic dialects in the wider historical region of Syria should not be overlooked by improper and unspecific use of Syrian/Syriac labels.

Diversity of Aramaic dialects was recorded by Theodoret of Cyrus (d. c. 466), who accepted Syrian/Syriac labels as common Greek designations for the Aramaic language, stating that "the Osroënians, the Syrians, the people of the Euphrates, the Palestinians, and the Phoenicians all speak Syriac, but with many differences in pronunciation". Theodoret's regional (provincial) differentiation of Aramaic dialects included an explicit distinction between the "Syrians" (as Aramaic speakers of Syria proper, western of Euphrates), and the "Osroenians" as Aramaic speakers of Osroene (eastern region, centered in Edessa), thus showing that dialect of the "Syrians" (Aramaic speakers of proper Syria) was known to be different from that of the "Osroenians" (speakers of Edessan Aramaic).

Native (endonymic) use of the term Aramaic language (Aramaya/Oromoyo) among its speakers has continued throughout the medieval period, as attested by the works of prominent writers, including the Oriental Orthodox Patriarch Michael of Antioch (d. 1199).

=== Wider and narrower meanings ===
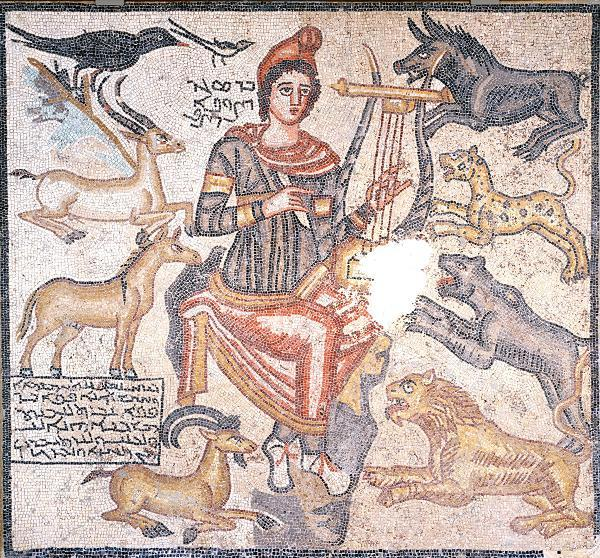
An ancient mosaic from Edessa, from the 2nd century AD, with inscriptions in early Edessan Aramaic (Old Syriac)

Since the proper dating of the Cave of Treasures, modern scholars were left with no indications of native Aramaic adoption of Syrian/Syriac labels before the 5th century. In the same time, a growing body of later sources showed that both in Greek, and in native literature, those labels were most commonly used as designations for the Aramaic language, including its various dialects (both eastern and western), thus challenging the conventional scholarly reduction of the term "Syriac language" to a specific designation for Edessan Aramaic. Such use, which excludes non-Edessan dialects, and particularly those of Western Aramaic provenience, persist as an accepted convention, but at the same time stands in contradiction both with original Greek, and later native (acquired) uses of Syrian/Syriac labels as common designations for the Aramaic language.

Those problems were addressed by prominent scholars, including Theodor Nöldeke (d. 1930) who noted on several occasions that the term "Syriac language" has come to have two distinctive meanings, wider and narrower, with the first (historical and wider) serving as a common synonym for the Aramaic language as a whole, while other (conventional and narrower) designations only refer to Edessan Aramaic, also referred to more specifically as "Classical Syriac".

Noting the problem, scholars have tried to resolve the issue by being more consistent in their use of the term "Classical Syriac" as a strict and clear scientific designation for the old literary and liturgical language, but the consistency of such use was never achieved within the field.

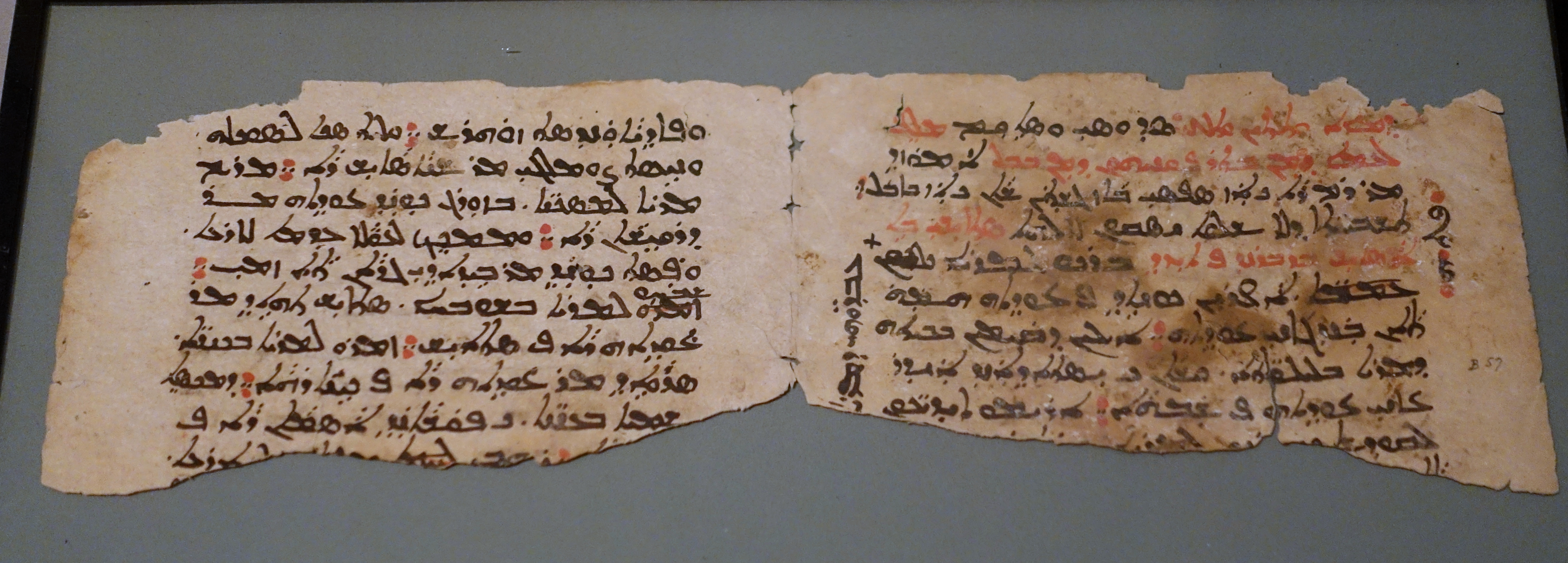
A bilingual Syriac and Neo-Persian psalter, in Syriac script, from the 12th–13th century

Inconsistent use of "Syrian/Syriac" labels in scholarly literature has led some researchers to raise additional questions, related not only to terminological issues but also to some more fundamental (methodological) problems, that were undermining the integrity of the field. Attempts to resolve those issues were unsuccessful, and in many scholarly works, related to the old literary and liturgical language, reduction of the term "Classical Syriac" to "Syriac" (only) remained a manner of convenience, even in titles of works, including encyclopedic entries, thus creating a large body of unspecific references, that became a base for the emergence of several new classes of terminological problems at the advent of the informational era. Those problems culminated during the process of international standardization of the terms "Syriac" and "Classical Syriac" within the ISO 639 and MARC systems.

The term "Classical Syriac" was accepted in 2007 and codified (ISO code: syc) as a designation for the old literary and liturgical language, thus confirming the proper use of the term. In the same time, within the MARC standard, code syc was accepted as designation for Classical Syriac, but under the name "Syriac", while the existing general code syr, that was until then named "Syriac", was renamed to "Syriac, Modern". Within ISO 639 system, large body of unspecific references related to various linguistic uses of the term "Syriac" remained related to the original ISO 639-2 code syr (Syriac), but its scope is defined within the ISO 639-3 standard as a macrolanguage that currently includes only some of the Neo-Aramaic languages. Such differences in classification, both terminological and substantial, within systems and between systems (ISO and MARC), led to the creation of several additional problems, that remain unresolved.

Within linguistics, mosaic of terminological ambiguities related to Syrian/Syriac labels was additionally enriched by introduction of the term "Palaeo-Syrian language" as a variant designation for the ancient Eblaite language from the third millennium BC, that is unrelated to the much later Edessan Aramaic, and its early phases, that were commonly labeled as Old/Proto- or even Paleo/Palaeo-Syrian/Syriac in scholarly literature. Newest addition to the terminological mosaic occurred c. 2014, when it was proposed, also by a scholar, that one of regional dialects of the Old Aramaic language from the first centuries of the 1st millennium BC should be called "Central Syrian Aramaic", thus introducing another ambiguous term, that can be used, in its generic meaning, to any local variant of Aramaic that occurred in central regions of Syria during any period in history.

After more than five centuries of Syriac studies, which were founded by western scholars at the end of the 15th century, main terminological issues related to the name and classification of the language known as Edessan Aramaic, and also referred to by several other names combined of Syrian/Syriac labels, remain opened and unsolved. Some of those issues have special sociolinguistic and ethnolinguistic significance for the remaining Neo-Aramaic speaking communities.

Since the occurrence of major political changes in the Near East (2003), those issues have acquired additional complexity, related to legal recognition of the language and its name. In the Constitution of Iraq (Article 4), adopted in 2005, and also in subsequent legislation, term "Syriac" (Arabic: السريانية, romanized: as-suryāniyya) is used as official designation for the language of Neo-Aramaic-speaking communities, thus opening additional questions related to linguistic and cultural identity of those communities. Legal and other practical (educational and informational) aspects of the linguistic self-identification also arose throughout Syriac-speaking diaspora, particularly in European countries (Germany, Sweden, Netherlands).

== Geographic distribution ==
Once a major language in the Fertile Crescent, Syriac is now limited to the towns and villages in the Nineveh Plains, Tur Abdin, the Khabur plains, in and around the cities of Mosul, Erbil and Kirkuk.

Signature of Syro-Malabar Venerable Varghese Payyappilly in Syriac language

Syriac was the local dialect of Aramaic in Edessa, and evolved under the influence of the Church of the East and the Syriac Orthodox Church into its current form. Before Arabic became the dominant language, Syriac was a major language among Christian communities in the Middle East, Central Asia and the Malabar Coast in India, and remains so among the Syriac Christians to this day. It has been found as far afield as Hadrian's Wall in Great Britain, with inscriptions written by Aramaic-speaking soldiers of the Roman Empire.

== History ==
The modern distribution of Neo-Aramaic languages, including Neo-Syriac groups

Īšoˁ, the Syriac pronunciation of the Hebrew and Aramaic name of Jesus, Ishoʿ

The history of the Syriac language is divided into several successive periods, defined primarily by linguistic, and also by cultural criteria. Some terminological and chronological distinctions exist between different classifications, that were proposed among scholars.

- "Old Syriac" (Old-Edessan Aramaic), represents the earliest stage in development of the language, that emerged by the beginning of the first century AD as the main Aramaic dialect in the region of Osroene, centered in Edessa, and continued to develop during the next two or three centuries, gradually gaining wider regional significance.
- "Middle Syriac" (Middle-Edessan Aramaic), most commonly known as "Classical Syriac" or "Literary Syriac" (ܟܬܒܢܝܐ Kṯāḇānāyā), represents the most important period in the history of the language, marked by notable literary, liturgical and cultural development and expansion, from the third to the thirteenth century. The period is further subdivided into three stages:
  - Early Classical Syriac (Pre-Classical Syriac), represents the earliest stage in development of Classical Syriac during the third and fourth century, preceding the later linguistic standardization.
  - Classical Syriac (in the narrower sense of the term), represents the main, standardized stage in development of Classical Syriac, from the fourth century up to the eighth century.
  - Late Classical Syriac (Post-Classical Syriac), represents the later, somewhat declining stage in development of Classical Syriac, from the eighth century up to the twelfth or thirteenth century.
- "Modern Syriac" (Neo-Syriac Aramaic) represents modern Neo-Aramaic languages. Neo-Syriac languages did not develop directly from Classical Syriac, but rather from closely related dialects, usually belonging to the same branch of Aramaic. Those dialects have long co-existed with Classical Syriac as a liturgical and literary language, and were significantly influenced by it during the late medieval and early modern period. Modern Syriac is divided into:
  - Modern Eastern Syriac (Northeastern Neo-Aramaic), including primarily Assyrian Neo-Aramaic and Chaldean Neo-Aramaic. The term is usually not used in reference to Neo-Mandaic, another variety of Eastern Aramaic spoken by the Mandaeans.
  - Modern Western Syriac (Central Neo-Aramaic), including (Turoyo and Mlahsô).
  - Modern Maaloulian Syriac (Western Neo-Aramaic), particularly the dialect of Maaloula is rarely referred to as "Modern Syriac" today, though it was historically described as "Syriac" or "Neo-Syriac" by some observers, likely due to its endonym Siryon.

=== Origins ===
The Linguistic homeland of Edessan Aramaic: the Kingdom of Osroene between the Romans and Parthians, in the 1st century AD

During the first three centuries of the Common Era, a local Aramaic dialect spoken in the Kingdom of Osroene, centered in Edessa, to the east of the Euphrates, started to gain prominence and regional significance. There are about eighty extant early inscriptions, written in Old-Edessan Aramaic, dated to the first three centuries AD, with the earliest inscription being dated to the 6th year AD, and the earliest parchment to 243 AD. All of these early examples of the language are non-Christian.

As a language of public life and administration in the region of Osroene, Edessan Aramaic was gradually given a relatively coherent form, style and grammar that is lacking in other Aramaic dialects of the same period. Since Old-Edessan Aramaic later developed into Classical Syriac, it was retroactively labeled by western scholars as "Old Syrian/Syriac" or "Proto-Syrian/Syriac", although the linguistic homeland of the language in the region of Osroene, was never part of contemporary (Roman) Syria.

=== Literary Syriac ===
The sixth beatitude (Matthew 5:8) from an East Syriac Peshitta. ܛܘܼܒܲܝܗܘܿܢ ܠܐܲܝܠܹܝܢ ܕܲܕ݂ܟܹܝܢ ܒܠܸܒ̇ܗܘܿܢ܄ ܕܗܸܢ݂ܘܿܢ ܢܸܚܙܘܿܢ ܠܐܲܠܵܗܵܐ܂ Ṭūḇayhōn l-ʾaylên da-ḏḵên b-lebbhōn, d-hennōn neḥzōn l-ʾălāhā. "Blessed are the pure in heart, for they shall see God."

In the 3rd century, churches in Edessa began to use local Aramaic dialect as the language of worship. Early literary efforts were focused on creation of an authoritative Aramaic translation of the Bible, the Peshitta (ܦܫܝܛܬܐ Pšīṭtā). At the same time, Ephrem the Syrian was producing the most treasured collection of poetry and theology in the Edessan Aramaic language, that later became known as Syriac.

In 489, many Syriac-speaking Christians living in the eastern reaches of the Roman Empire fled to the Sasanian Empire to escape persecution and growing animosity with Greek-speaking Christians. The Christological differences with the Church of the East led to the bitter Nestorian Schism in the Syriac-speaking world. As a result, Syriac developed distinctive western and eastern varieties. Although remaining a single language with a high level of comprehension between the varieties, the two employ distinctive variations in pronunciation and writing system, and, to a lesser degree, in vocabulary.

The Syriac language later split into a western variety, used mainly by the Syriac Orthodox Church in upper Mesopotamia and Syria proper, and an eastern variety used mainly by the Church of the East in central and northeastern Mesopotamia. Religious divisions were also reflected in linguistic differences between the Western Syriac Rite and the Eastern Syriac Rite. During the 5th and the 6th century, Syriac reached its height as the lingua franca of Mesopotamia and surrounding regions. It existed in literary (liturgical) form, as well as in vernacular forms, as the native language of Syriac-speaking populations.

Following the Arab conquest in the 7th century, vernacular forms of Syriac were gradually replaced during the next centuries by the advancing Arabic language. Having an Aramaic (Syriac) substratum, the regional Arabic dialect (Mesopotamian Arabic) developed under the strong influence of local Aramaic (Syriac) dialects, sharing significant similarities in language structure, as well as having evident and stark influences from previous (ancient) languages of the region. Syriac-influenced Arabic dialects developed among Iraqi Muslims, as well as Iraqi Christians, most of whom descend from native Syriac speakers.

Western Syriac is the official language of the West Syriac Rite, practiced by the Syriac Orthodox Church, the Syriac Catholic Church, the Maronite Catholic Church, the Malankara Orthodox Syrian Church, the Malabar Independent Syrian Church, the Malankara Mar Thoma Syrian Church, the Syro-Malankara Catholic Church and some Parishes in the Syro-Malabar Knanaya Archeparchy of Kottayam.

Eastern Syriac is the liturgical language of the East Syriac Rite, practised in modern times by the ethnic Assyrian followers of the Assyrian Church of the East, the Assyrian Pentecostal Church, the Ancient Church of the East, the Chaldean Catholic Church, as well as the Syro-Malabar Catholic Church in India.

Syriac literature is by far the most prodigious of the various Aramaic languages. Its corpus covers poetry, prose, theology, liturgy, hymnody, history, philosophy, science, medicine and natural history. We also have examples of Syriac translations of documentary sources, like the portion of the Acts of the Second Council of Ephesus. Much of this wealth remains unavailable in critical editions or modern translation.

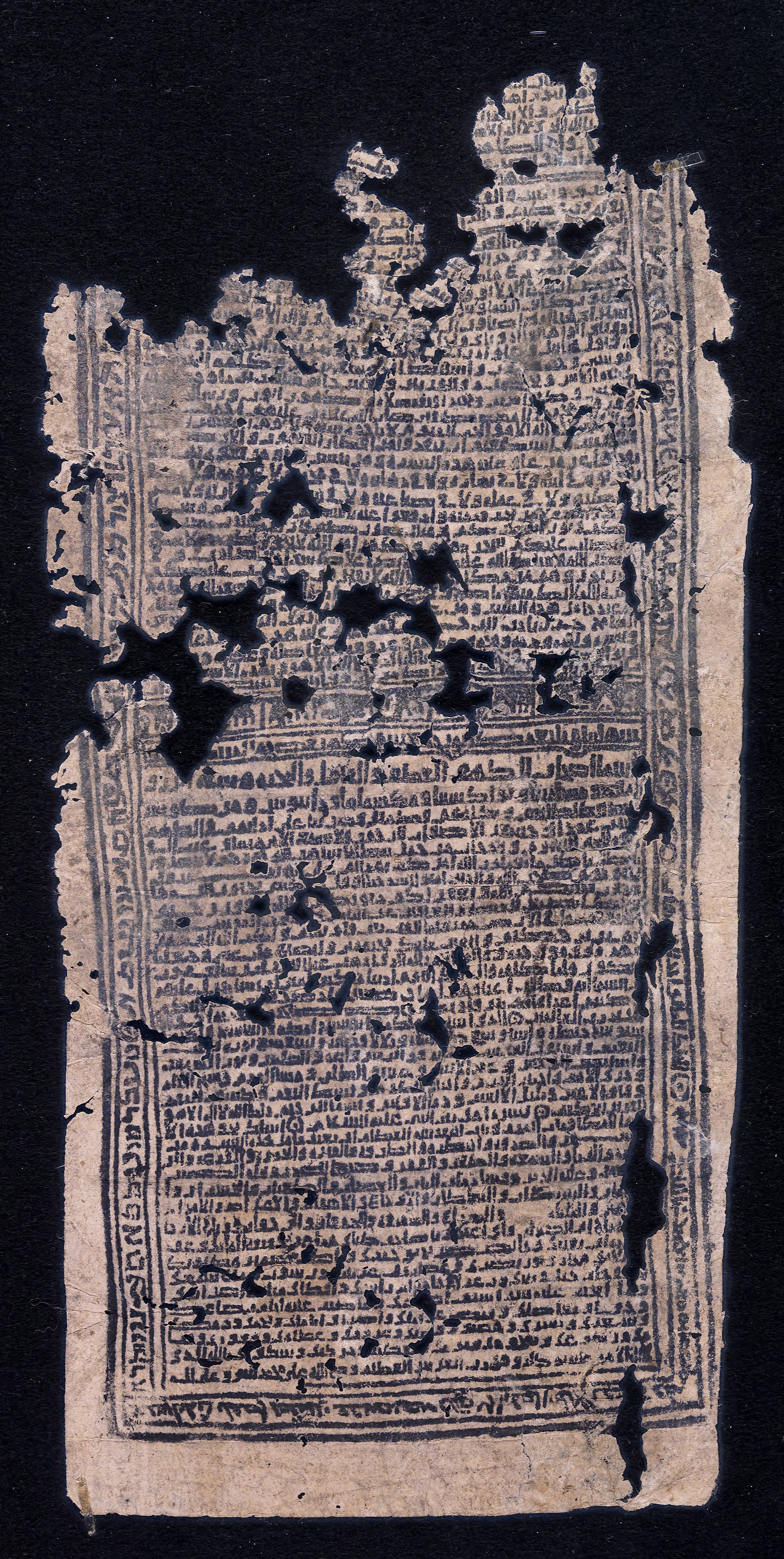
12th–13th century quadrilingual tarsh printed amulet about the seven sleepers with a Syriac border on the bottom. One of the earliest examples of Syriac printing.

From the 7th century onwards, Syriac gradually gave way to Arabic as the spoken language of much of the region, excepting northern Iraq and Mount Lebanon. The Mongol invasions and conquests of the 13th century, and the religiously motivated massacres of Syriac Christians by Timur further contributed to the rapid decline of the language. In many places outside of Upper Mesopotamia and Mount Lebanon, even in liturgy, it was replaced by Arabic.

=== Current status ===
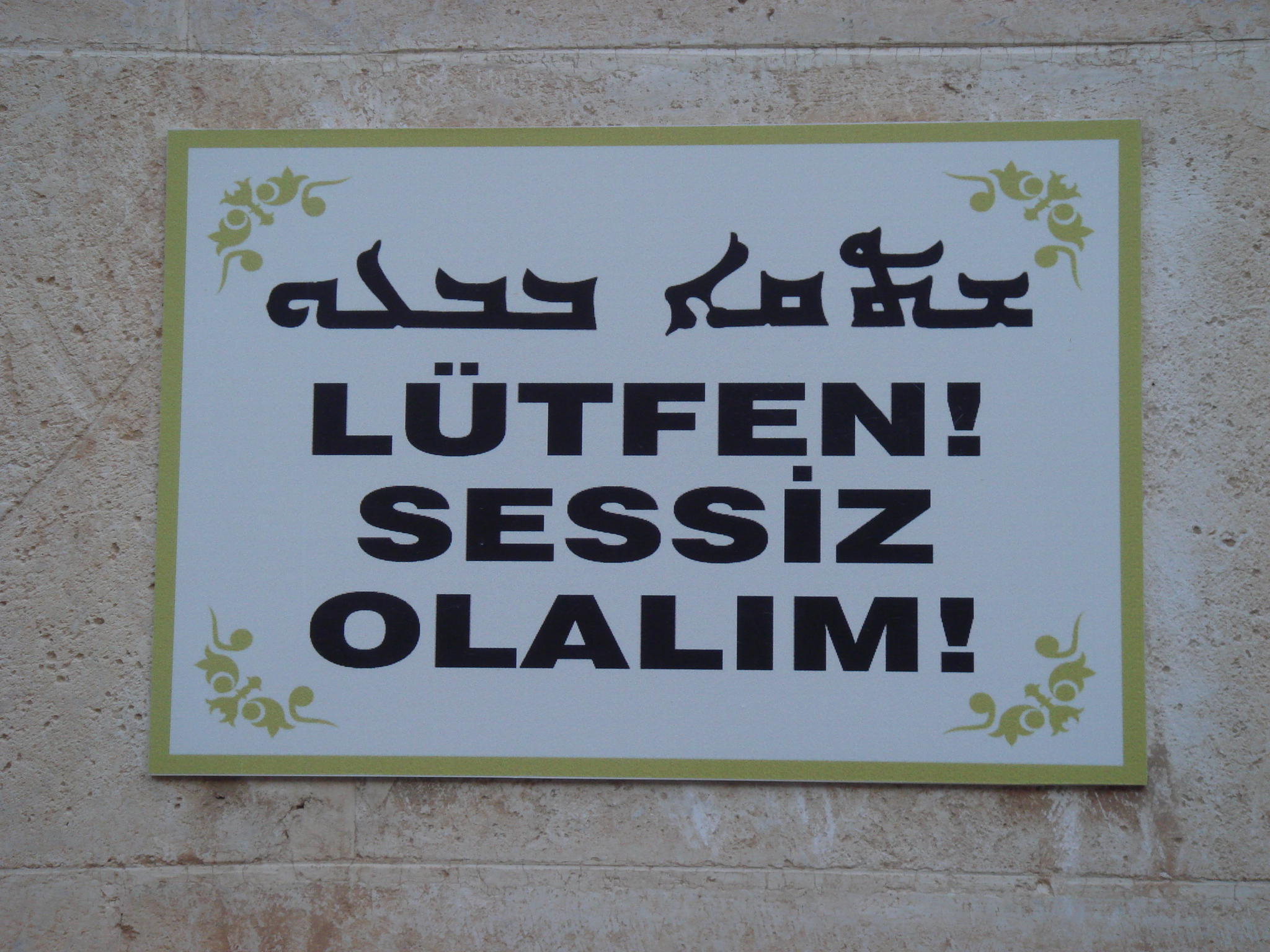
A warning sign in Mardin, Turkey: Syriac / Turkish; ܫܬܩܐ ܒܒܥܘ šeṯqā, b-ḇāʿū 'Silence, please') / Lütfen! Sessiz olalım! 'Please! Let's be quiet!'

Revivals of literary Syriac in recent times have led to some success with the creation of newspapers in written Syriac (ܟܬܒܢܝܐ Kṯāḇānāyā), similar to the use of Modern Standard Arabic has been employed since the early decades of the 20th century. Modern forms of literary Syriac have also been used not only in religious literature but also in secular genres, often with Assyrian nationalistic themes.

Syriac is spoken as the liturgical language of the Syriac Orthodox Church, as well as by some of its adherents. Syriac has been recognised as an official minority language in Iraq. It is also taught in some public schools in Iraq, Syria, Palestine, Israel, Sweden, Augsburg (Germany) and Kerala (India).

In 2014, an Assyrian nursery school could finally be opened in Yeşilköy, Istanbul, after waging a lawsuit against the Ministry of National Education which had denied it permission, but was required to respect non-Muslim minority rights as specified in the Treaty of Lausanne.

In August 2016, the Ourhi Centre was founded by the Assyrian community in the city of Qamishli, to educate teachers in order to make Syriac an additional language to be taught in public schools in the Jazira Region of the Autonomous Administration of North and East Syria, which then started with the 2016/17 academic year.

In April 2023, a team of AI researchers completed the first AI translation model and website for classical Syriac.

== Grammar ==
Many Syriac words, like those in other Semitic languages, belong to triconsonantal roots, collations of three Syriac consonants. New words are built from these three consonants with variable vowel and consonant sets. For example, the following words belong to the root ܫܩܠ (ŠQL), to which a basic meaning of taking can be assigned:

- ܫܩܠ – šqal: "he has taken"
- ܢܫܩܘܠ – nešqol: "he will take, ... let him take, ... so that he might take."
- ܫܩܘܠ – šqol: "take! (masculine singular)"
- ܫܩܠ – šāqel: "he takes, he is taking, the one (masculine) who takes"
- ܫܩܠ – šaqqel: "he has lifted/raised"
- ܐܫܩܠ – ʾašqel: "he has set out"
- ܫܩܠܐ – šqālā: "a taking, burden, recension, portion or syllable"
- ܫܩ̈ܠܐ – šeqlē: "takings, profits, taxes"
- ܫܩܠܘܬܐ – šaqluṯā: "a beast of burden"
- ܫܘܩܠܐ – šuqqālā: "arrogance"

=== Nouns ===
Most Syriac nouns are built from triliteral roots. Nouns carry grammatical gender (masculine or feminine), they can be either singular or plural in number (a very few can be dual) and can exist in one of three grammatical states. These states should not be confused with grammatical cases in other languages.

- The absolute state is the basic form of the noun – ܫܩ̈ܠܝܢ, šeqlin, "taxes".
- The emphatic state usually represents a definite noun – ܫܩ̈ܠܐ, šeqlē, "the taxes".
- The construct state marks a noun in relationship to another noun – ܫܩ̈ܠܝ, šeqlay, "taxes of...".

However, very quickly in the development of Classical Syriac, the emphatic state became the ordinary form of the noun, and the absolute and construct states were relegated to certain stock phrases (for example, ܒܪ ܐܢܫܐ/ܒܪܢܫܐ, bar nāšā, "man, person", literally "son of man").

In Old and early Classical Syriac, most genitive noun relationships are built using the construct state, but contrary to the genitive case, it is the head-noun which is marked by the construct state. Thus, ܫܩ̈ܠܝ ܡܠܟܘܬܐ, šeqlay malkuṯā, means "the taxes of the kingdom". Quickly, the construct relationship was abandoned and replaced by the use of the relative particle ܕ, d-, da-. Thus, the same noun phrase becomes ܫܩ̈ܠܐ ܕܡܠܟܘܬܐ, šeqlē d-malkuṯā, where both nouns are in the emphatic state. Very closely related nouns can be drawn into a closer grammatical relationship by the addition of a pronominal suffix. Thus, the phrase can be written as ܫܩ̈ܠܝܗ ܕܡܠܟܘܬܐ, šeqlêh d-malkuṯā. In this case, both nouns continue to be in the emphatic state, but the first has the suffix that makes it literally read "her taxes" ("kingdom" is feminine), and thus is "her taxes, [those] of the kingdom".

Adjectives always agree in gender and number with the nouns they modify. Adjectives are in the absolute state if they are predicative, but agree with the state of their noun if attributive. Thus, ܒܝܫܝ̈ܢ ܫܩ̈ܠܐ, bišin šeqlē, means "the taxes are evil", whereas ܫܩ̈ܠܐ ܒܝ̈ܫܐ, šeqlē ḇišē, means "evil taxes".

=== Verbs ===
Most Syriac verbs are built on triliteral roots as well. Finite verbs carry person, gender (except in the first person) and number, as well as tense and conjugation. The non-finite verb forms are the infinitive and the active and passive participles.

Syriac has only two true morphological tenses: perfect and imperfect. Whereas these tenses were originally aspectual in Aramaic, they have become a truly temporal past and future tenses respectively. The present tense is usually marked with the participle followed by the subject pronoun. Such pronouns are usually omitted in the case of the third person. This use of the participle to mark the present tense is the most common of a number of compound tenses that can be used to express varying senses of tense and aspect.

Syriac also employs derived verb stems such as are present in other Semitic languages. These are regular modifications of the verb's root to express other changes in meaning. The first stem is the ground state, or Pəʿal (this name models the shape of the root) form of the verb, which carries the usual meaning of the word. The next is the intensive stem, or Paʿʿel, form of the verb, which usually carries an intensified meaning. The third is the extensive stem, or ʾAp̄ʿel, form of the verb, which is often causative in meaning. Each of these stems has its parallel passive conjugation: the ʾEṯpəʿel, ʾEṯpaʿʿal and ʾEttap̄ʿal respectively. To these six cardinal stems are added a few irregular stems, like the Šap̄ʿel and ʾEštap̄ʿal, which generally have an extensive meaning.

The basic G-stem or "Peal" conjugation of "to write" in the perfect and imperfect is as follows:

		Perfect		Imperfect	
		singular	plural	singular	plural
1st person		ܟܬܒܬ keṯḇeṯ	ܟܬܒܢ kəṯaḇn	ܐܟܬܘܒ eḵtoḇ	ܢܟܬܘܒ neḵtoḇ
2nd person	m.	ܟܬܒܬ kəṯaḇt	ܟܬܒܬܘܢ kəṯaḇtûn	ܬܟܬܘܒ teḵtoḇ	ܬܟܬܒܘܢ teḵtəḇûn
2nd person	f.	ܟܬܒܬܝ kəṯaḇt	ܟܬܒ̈ܬܝܢ kəṯaḇtên	ܬܟܬܒܝܢ teḵtəḇîn	ܬܟܬܒ̈ܢ teḵtəḇān
3rd person	m.	ܟܬܒ kəṯaḇ	ܟܬܒܘ kəṯaḇ	ܢܟܬܘܒ neḵtoḇ	ܢܟܬܒܘܢ neḵtəḇûn
3rd person	f.	ܟܬܒܬ keṯbaṯ	ܟܬܒ kəṯaḇ	ܬܟܬܘܒ teḵtoḇ	ܢܟܬܒ̈ܢ neḵtəḇān

== Phonology ==
ʾAḇôn daḇašmayyā
Lord's Prayer, ʾAḇōn daḇašmayyā sung in Western Syriac

Phonologically, like the other Northwest Semitic languages, Syriac has 22 consonants. The consonantal phonemes are:

transliteration	ʾ	b	g	d	h	w	z	ḥ	ṭ	y	k	l	m	n	s	ʿ	p	ṣ	q	r	š	t
letter	ܐ	ܒ	ܓ	ܕ	ܗ	ܘ	ܙ	ܚ	ܛ	ܝ	ܟ	ܠ	ܡ	ܢ	ܣ	ܥ	ܦ	ܨ	ܩ	ܪ	ܫ	ܬ
pronunciation	[ʔ]	[b], [v]	[g], [ɣ]	[d], [ð]	[h]	[w]	[z]	[ħ]	[tˤ]	[j]	[k], [x]	[l]	[m]	[n]	[s]	[ʕ]	[p], [f]	[sˤ]	[q]	[r]	[ʃ]	[t], [θ]

Phonetically, there is some variation in the pronunciation of Syriac in its various forms. The various Modern Eastern Aramaic vernaculars have quite different pronunciations, and these sometimes influence how the classical language is pronounced, for example, in public prayer. Classical Syriac has two major streams of pronunciation: western and eastern.

=== Consonants ===
Syriac shares with Aramaic a set of lightly contrasted stop/fricative pairs. In different variations of a certain lexical root, a root consonant might exist in stop form in one variation and fricative form in another. In the Syriac alphabet, a single letter is used for each pair. Sometimes a dot is placed above the letter (quššāyā "strengthening"; equivalent to a dagesh in Hebrew) to mark that the stop pronunciation is required, and a dot is placed below the letter (rukkāḵā "softening") to mark that the fricative pronunciation is required. The pairs are:

- Voiced labial pair – /b/ and /v/
- Voiced velar pair – /ɡ/ and /ɣ/
- Voiced dental pair – /d/ and /ð/
- Voiceless labial pair – /p/ and /f/
- Voiceless velar pair – /k/ and /x/
- Voiceless dental pair – /t/ and /θ/

Like some Semitic languages, Syriac too has emphatic consonants, and it has three of them, /q/ being a historically emphatic variant of /k/. These are consonants that have a coarticulation in the pharynx or slightly higher. There are two pharyngeal fricatives, another class of consonants typically found in Semitic languages. Syriac also has a rich array of sibilants:

Table of Syriac consonants
	Bilabial		Labio- dental		Dental		Alveolar			Post- alveolar	Palatal	Velar		Uvular	Pharyn- geal		Glottal
	Bilabial		Labio- dental		Dental		plain		emphatic	Post- alveolar	Palatal	Velar		Uvular	Pharyn- geal		Glottal
Nasal	m						n										
Stop	p	b					t	d	tˤ			k	ɡ	q			ʔ
Fricative			f	v	θ	ð	s	z	sˤ	ʃ		x		ɣ	ħ	ʕ	h
Approximant	w						l				j						
Trill							r										

=== Vowels ===
As with most Semitic languages, the vowels of Syriac are mostly subordinated to consonants. Especially in the presence of an emphatic consonant, vowels tend to become mid-centralised.

Classical Syriac had the following distinguishable vowels:

Vowel phonemes in Classical Syriac
	Front	Back	
	Front	unrounded	rounded
Close	i		u
Close-mid	e		o
Open-mid	ɛ		
Open	a	ɑ	

In the western dialect, /ɑ/ has become [ɔ], and the original /o/ has merged with /u/. In eastern dialects, there is more fluidity in the pronunciation of front vowels, with some speakers distinguishing five qualities of such vowels, and others only distinguishing three. Vowel length is generally not important: close vowels tend to be longer than open vowels.

The open vowels form diphthongs with the approximants /j/ and /w/. In almost all dialects, the full sets of possible diphthongs collapses into two or three actual pronunciations:

- /ɑj/ usually becomes /aj/, but the western dialect has /oj/
- /aj/, further, sometimes monophthongized to /e/
- /aw/ usually becomes /ɑw/
- /ɑw/, further, sometimes monophthongized to /o/

== See also ==
- Syriac literature
- Syriac sacral music
- Syriac Christianity
- Syriac studies
- Aramaic studies
- Bible translations into Syriac
- Bible translations into Aramaic
- Neo-Aramaic languages
- List of loanwords in Classical Syriac
- Corpus Scriptorum Christianorum Orientalium

== Sources ==
- Andrade, Nathanael J. (2013). Syrian Identity in the Greco-Roman World. Cambridge: Cambridge University Press. ISBN 9781107244566.
- Andrade, Nathanael J. (2011). "Framing the Syrian of Late Antiquity: Engagements with Hellenism". Journal of Modern Hellenism. 28 (2010-2011): 1–46.
- Andrade, Nathanael J. (2014). "Assyrians, Syrians and the Greek Language in the late Hellenistic and Roman Imperial Periods". Journal of Near Eastern Studies. 73 (2): 299–317. doi:10.1086/677249. S2CID 163755644.
- Andrade, Nathanael J. (2019). "Syriac and Syrians in the Later Roman Empire: Questions of identity". The Syriac World. London: Routledge. pp. 157–174. ISBN 9781138899018.
- Beyer, Klaus (1986). The Aramaic Language: Its Distribution and Subdivisions. Göttingen: Vandenhoeck und Ruprecht. ISBN 9783525535738.
- Briquel-Chatonnet, Françoise (2012). "Syriac as the Language of Eastern Christianity". The Semitic Languages: An International Handbook. Berlin-Boston: Walter de Gruyter. pp. 652–659. ISBN 9783110251586.
- Briquel-Chatonnet, Françoise (2019). "Writing Syriac: Manuscripts and Inscriptions". The Syriac World. London: Routledge. pp. 243–265. ISBN 9781138899018.
- Brock, Sebastian P. (1983). "Towards a History of Syriac Translation Technique". III Symposium Syriacum 1980. Roma: Pontificium institutum studiorum orientalium. pp. 1–14.
- Brock, Sebastian P. (1984). Syriac Perspectives on Late Antiquity. London: Variorum Reprints. ISBN 9780860781479.
- Brock, Sebastian P. (1989). "Three Thousand Years of Aramaic Literature". ARAM Periodical. 1 (1): 11–23.
- Brock, Sebastian P. (1989). "Some Observations on the Use of Classical Syriac in the Late Twentieth Century". Journal of Semitic Studies. 34 (2): 363–375. doi:10.1093/jss/XXXIV.2.363.
- Brock, Sebastian P. (1992) [1985]. The Luminous Eye: The Spiritual World Vision of Saint Ephrem (2nd revised ed.). Kalamazoo: Cistercian Publications. ISBN 9780879075248.
- Brock, Sebastian P. (1992). Studies in Syriac Christianity: History, Literature, and Theology. Aldershot: Variorum. ISBN 9780860783053.
- Brock, Sebastian P. (1992). "Eusebius and Syriac Christianity". Eusebius, Christianity, and Judaism. Detroit: Wayne State University Press. pp. 212–234. ISBN 0814323618.
- Brock, Sebastian P. (1994). "Greek and Syriac in Late Antique Syria". Literacy and Power in the Ancient World. Cambridge: Cambridge University Press. pp. 149–160, 234–235. ISBN 9780521587365.
- Brock, Sebastian P. (1996). Syriac Studies: A Classified Bibliography, 1960-1990. Kaslik: Parole de l'Orient.
- Brock, Sebastian P. (1997). A Brief Outline of Syriac Literature. Kottayam: St. Ephrem Ecumenical Research Institute. ISBN 978-1-61143-563-4.
- Brock, Sebastian P. (1998). "Syriac Culture, 337–425". The Cambridge Ancient History. Vol. 13. Cambridge: Cambridge University Press. pp. 708–719. ISBN 9780521302005.
- Brock, Sebastian P. (1999). From Ephrem to Romanos: Interactions Between Syriac and Greek in Late Antiquity. Aldershot: Ashgate. ISBN 9780860788003.
- Brock, Sebastian P. (1999). "St. Ephrem in the Eyes of Later Syriac Liturgical Tradition" (PDF). Hugoye: Journal of Syriac Studies. 2 (1): 5–25. doi:10.31826/hug-2010-020103. S2CID 212688898.
- Brock, Sebastian P.; Taylor, David G. K., eds. (2001). The Hidden Pearl: The Syrian Orthodox Church and its Ancient Aramaic Heritage. Vol. 1. Rome: Trans World Film Italia.
- Brock, Sebastian P. (2004). "The Earliest Syriac Literature". The Cambridge History of Early Christian Literature. Cambridge: Cambridge University Press. pp. 161–172. ISBN 9780521460835.
- Brock, Sebastian P. (2005). "The Syriac Orient: A Third 'Lung' for the Church?". Orientalia Christiana Periodica. 71: 5–20.
- Brock, Sebastian P. (2006). Fire from Heaven: Studies in Syriac Theology and Liturgy. Aldershot: Ashgate. ISBN 9780754659082.
- Brock, Sebastian P. (2007). "Early Dated Manuscripts of the Church of the East, 7th–13th Century". Journal of Assyrian Academic Studies. 21 (2): 8–34. Archived from the original on 6 October 2008.
- Brock, Sebastian P. (2008) [1979]. The Holy Spirit in the Syrian Baptismal Tradition (3rd ed.). Piscataway, NJ: Gorgias Press. ISBN 9781593338442.
- Brock, Sebastian P. (2010). "Jacob the Annotator: Jacob's Annotations to His Revised Translation of Severus' Cathedral Homilies". Studies on Jacob of Edessa. Piscataway: Gorgias Press. pp. 1–13. doi:10.31826/9781463216634-002. ISBN 9781463216634.
- Brock, Sebastian P. (2011). "Christian Palestinian Aramaic". Gorgias Encyclopedic Dictionary of the Syriac Heritage. Piscataway, NJ: Gorgias Press. pp. 96–97.
- Brock, Sebastian P.; Butts, Aaron M. (2011). "Syriac Conferences". Gorgias Encyclopedic Dictionary of the Syriac Heritage. Piscataway, NJ: Gorgias Press. pp. 389–390.
- Brock, Sebastian P.; Coakley, James F. (2011). "Arameans". Gorgias Encyclopedic Dictionary of the Syriac Heritage. Piscataway, NJ: Gorgias Press. pp. 30–31.
- Brock, Sebastian P. (2017). An Introduction to Syriac Studies. Piscataway, NJ: Gorgias Press. ISBN 9781463207137.
- Brock, Sebastian P. (2017). "Scribal Tradition and the Transmission of Syriac Literature in Late Antiquity and Early Islam". Scribal Practices and the Social Construction of Knowledge in Antiquity. Leuven: Peeters Publishers. pp. 61–68. ISBN 9789042933149.
- Brock, Sebastian P. (2019). The People and the Peoples: Syriac Dialogue Poems from Late Antiquity. Oxford: Journal of Jewish Studies. ISBN 9780957522817.
- Brock, Sebastian P. (2019). "Later Syriac Poetry". The Syriac World. London: Routledge. pp. 327–338. ISBN 9781138899018.
- Brockelmann, Carl (1895). Lexicon Syriacum (1st ed.). Berlin: Reuther & Reichard.
- Burnett, Stephen G. (2005). "Christian Aramaism: The Birth and Growth of Aramaic Scholarship in the Sixteenth Century" ( (PDF)). Seeking Out the Wisdom of the Ancients. Winona Lake: Eisenbrauns. pp. 421–436. Archived from the original on 27 August 2021.
- Butts, Aaron M. (2011). "Syriac Language". Gorgias Encyclopedic Dictionary of the Syriac Heritage. Piscataway, NJ: Gorgias Press. pp. 390–391.
- Butts, Aaron M. (2016). Language Change in the Wake of Empire: Syriac in its Greco-Roman Context. Winona Lake: Eisenbrauns. ISBN 9781575064215.
- Butts, Aaron M. (2018). "The Greco-Roman Context of the Syriac Language". Les auteurs syriaques et leur langue. Paris: Geuthner. pp. 137–165.
- Butts, Aaron M. (2019). "The Classical Syriac Language". The Syriac World. London: Routledge. pp. 222–242. doi:10.4324/9781315708195-15. ISBN 978-1-315-70819-5.
- Carlson, Thomas A. (2019). "Syriac in a Diverse Middle East: From the Mongol Ilkhanate to Ottoman Dominance, 1286–1517". The Syriac World. London: Routledge. pp. 718–730. ISBN 9781138899018.
- Donabed, Sargon G. (2015). Reforging a Forgotten History: Iraq and the Assyrians in the Twentieth Century. Edinburgh: Edinburgh University Press. ISBN 9780748686056.
- Donabed, Sargon G. (2017). "Neither Syriac-speaking nor Syrian Orthodox Christians: Harput Assyrians in the United States as a Model for Ethnic Self-Categorization and Expression". Syriac in its Multi-Cultural Context. Leuven: Peeters Publishers. pp. 359–369. ISBN 9789042931640.
- Drijvers, Hendrik J. W. (1980). Cults and Beliefs at Edessa. Leiden: Brill. ISBN 9004060502.
- Farina, Margherita (2018). "La linguistique syriaque selon Jacques d'Édesse". Lesauteurs syriaques etleurlangue. Paris: Geuthner. pp. 167–187.
- Garbini, Giovanni (1981). "Considerations on the Language of Ebla". La Lingua Di Ebla: Atti Del Convegno Internazionale (1st ed.). Napoli: Istituto universitario orientale, Seminario di studi asiatici. pp. 75–82.
- Gzella, Holger (2014). "Language and Script". The Aramaeans in Ancient Syria. Leiden: Brill. pp. 71–107. ISBN 9789004229433.
- Gzella, Holger (2015). A Cultural History of Aramaic: From the Beginnings to the Advent of Islam. Leiden-Boston: Brill. ISBN 9789004285101.
- Gzella, Holger (2019). "The Syriac Language in the Context of the Semitic Languages". The Syriac World. London: Routledge. pp. 205–221. doi:10.4324/9781315708195-14. ISBN 978-1-315-70819-5.
- Healey, John F. (1980). First Studies in Syriac. Birmingham: University of Birmingham. ISBN 9780704403901.
- Healey, John F. (2007). "The Edessan Milieu and the Birth of Syriac" (PDF). Hugoye: Journal of Syriac Studies. 10 (2): 115–127.
- Healey, John F. (2009). Aramaic Inscriptions and Documents of the Roman Period. Oxford: Oxford University Press. ISBN 9780199252565.
- Healey, John F. (2012). "Syriac". The Semitic Languages: An International Handbook. Berlin-Boston: Walter de Gruyter. pp. 637–652. ISBN 9783110251586.
- Healey, John F. (2008). "Variety in Early Syriac: The Context in Contemporary Aramaic". Aramaic in Its Historical and Linguistic Setting. Wiesbaden: Harrassowitz Verlag. pp. 221–229. ISBN 9783447057875.
- Healey, John F. (2019). "The Pre-Christian Religions of the Syriac-Speaking Regions". The Syriac World. London: Routledge. pp. 47–67. ISBN 9781138899018.
- Heinrichs, Wolfhart, ed. (1990). Studies in Neo-Aramaic. Atlanta: Scholars Press. ISBN 9781555404307.
- Herman, Geoffrey (2019). "The Syriac World in the Persian Empire". The Syriac World. London: Routledge. pp. 134–145. doi:10.4324/9781315708195-9. ISBN 978-1-315-70819-5.
- Ishow, Habib (1978). "Faut-il remplacer le terme syriaque par le terme araméen?". Symposium Syriacum 1976. Roma: Pontificium institutum studiorum orientalium. pp. 359–365.
- Joseph, John B. (2000). The Modern Assyrians of the Middle East: A History of Their Encounter with Western Christian Missions, Archaeologists, and Colonial Powers. Leiden: Brill. ISBN 9004116419.
- Khan, Geoffrey (2007). "Aramaic in the Medieval and Modern Periods" (PDF). Languages of Iraq: Ancient and Modern. Cambridge: The British School of Archaeology in Iraq. pp. 95–114.
- Kim, Ronald (2008). "Stammbaum or Continuum? The Subgrouping of Modern Aramaic Dialects Reconsidered". Journal of the American Oriental Society. 128 (3): 505–531.
- Kiraz, George A. (2007). "Kthobonoyo Syriac: Some Observations and Remarks" (PDF). Hugoye: Journal of Syriac Studies. 10 (2): 129–142.
- Lipiński, Edward (2001) [1997]. Semitic Languages: Outline of a Comparative Grammar (2nd ed.). Leuven: Peeters Publishers. ISBN 9789042908154.
- Maclean, Arthur J. (1895). Grammar of the Dialects of Vernacular Syriac: As Spoken by the Eastern Syrians of Kurdistan, North-West Persia and the Plain of Mosul, with Notices of the Vernacular of the Jews of Azerbijan and of Zakhu near Mosul. Cambridge: Cambridge University Press. ISBN 9781107648128.
- Messo, Johny (2011). "The Origin of the Terms Syria(n) and Suryoyo: Once Again". Parole de l'Orient. 36: 111–125.
- Millar, Fergus (2006). A Greek Roman Empire: Power and Belief under Theodosius II (408–450). Berkeley: University of California Press. ISBN 9780520253919.
- Millar, Fergus (2008). "Community, Religion and Language in the Middle-Euphrates Zone in Late Antiquity". Scripta Classica Israelica. 27: 67–93. doi:10.71043/sci.v27i.3273.
- Millar, Fergus (2011). "Greek and Syriac in Edessa: From Ephrem to Rabbula (CE 363–435)". Semitica et Classica. 4: 99–114. doi:10.1484/J.SEC.1.102508.
- Millar, Fergus (2012). "Greek and Syriac in Fifth-Century Edessa: The Case of Bishop Hibas". Semitica et Classica. 5: 151–165. doi:10.1484/J.SEC.1.103053.
- Millar, Fergus (2013). "The Evolution of the Syrian Orthodox Church in the Pre-Islamic Period: From Greek to Syriac?" (PDF). Journal of Early Christian Studies. 21 (1): 43–92. doi:10.1353/earl.2013.0002. S2CID 170436440.
- Minov, Sergey (2017). "Date and Provenance of the Syriac Cave of Treasures: A Reappraisal". Hugoye: Journal of Syriac Studies. 20 (1): 129–229. doi:10.31826/hug-2018-200105. S2CID 212688445.
- Minov, Sergey (2020). Memory and Identity in the Syriac Cave of Treasures: Rewriting the Bible in Sasanian Iran. Leiden-Boston: Brill. ISBN 9789004445512.
- Murre van den Berg, Heleen (2008). "Classical Syriac, Neo-Aramaic, and Arabic in the Churchof the East and the Chaldean Church between 1500 and 1800". Aramaic in Its Historical and Linguistic Setting. Wiesbaden: Harrassowitz Verlag. pp. 335–352. ISBN 9783447057875.
- Naby, Eden (2004). "From Lingua Franca to Endangered Language: The Legal Aspects of the Preservation of Aramaic in Iraq". On the Margins of Nations: Endangered Languages and Linguistic Rights. Bath: Foundation for Endangered Languages. pp. 197–203. ISBN 9780953824861.
- Neill, Stephen (2004) [1984]. A History of Christianity in India: The Beginnings to AD 1707. Cambridge: Cambridge University Press. ISBN 9780521548854.
- Nöldeke, Theodor (1886). "Semitic Languages". The Encyclopaedia Britannica. Vol. 21 (9th ed.). New York: Charles Scribner's Sons. pp. 641–656.
- Nöldeke, Theodor (1904). Compendious Syriac Grammar (1st English ed.). London: Williams & Norgate.
- Pat-El, Na‘ama (2019). Syriac (2nd ed.). John Huehnergard and Na‘ama Pat-El (eds.), The Semitic Languages: London & New York: Routledge. pp. 653–678.
- Petruccione, John F.; Hill, Robert C., eds. (2007). Theodoret of Cyrus: The Questions on the Octateuch. Vol. 2. Washington: COA Press. ISBN 9780813214993.
- Peursen, Wido van (2008). "Language Variation, Language Development, and the Textual History of the Peshitta". Aramaic in Its Historical and Linguistic Setting. Wiesbaden: Harrassowitz Verlag. pp. 231–256. ISBN 9783447057875.
- Río Sánchez, Francisco del (2013). "Influences of Aramaic on dialectal Arabic". Archaism and Innovation in the Semitic Languages: Selected papers. Cordoba: Cordoba Near Eastern Research Unit. pp. 129–136.
- Robinson, Theodore H.; Coakley, James F. (2013) [1915]. Robinson's Paradigms and Exercises in Syriac Grammar (6th revised ed.). Oxford: Oxford University Press. ISBN 9780199687176.
- Rompay, Lucas van (1994). "Some Preliminary Remarks on the Origins of Classical Syriac as a Standard Language: The Syriac Version of Eusebius of Caesarea's Ecclesiastical History". Semitic and Cushitic studies. Wiesbaden: Otto Harrassowitz Verlag. pp. 70–89. ISBN 9783447034470.
- Rompay, Lucas van (2000). "Past and Present Perceptions of Syriac Literary Tradition" (PDF). Hugoye: Journal of Syriac Studies. 3 (1): 71–103. doi:10.31826/hug-2010-030105. S2CID 212688244.
- Rompay, Lucas van (2008). "The East: Syria and Mesopotamia". The Oxford Handbook of Early Christian Studies. Oxford: Oxford University Press. pp. 365–386. ISBN 9780199271566.
- Rompay, Lucas van (2011). "Aramaic". Gorgias Encyclopedic Dictionary of the Syriac Heritage. Piscataway, NJ: Gorgias Press. pp. 28–30.
- Rubin, Milka (1998). "The Language of Creation or the Primordial Language: A Case of Cultural Polemics in Antiquity". Journal of Jewish Studies. 49 (2): 306–333. doi:10.18647/2120/JJS-1998.
- Rudder, Joshua. Learn to Write Aramaic: A Step-by-Step Approach to the Historical & Modern Scripts. n.p.: CreateSpace Independent Publishing Platform, 2011. 220 pp. ISBN 978-1461021421 Includes the Estrangela (pp. 59–113), Madnhaya (pp. 191–206), and the Western Serto (pp. 173–190) scripts.
- Ruzer, Serge (2014). "Hebrew versus Aramaic as Jesus' Language: Notes on Early Opinions by Syriac Authors". The Language Environment of First Century Judaea. Leiden-Boston: Brill. pp. 182–205. ISBN 9789004264410.
- Shepardson, Christine (2019). Controlling Contested Places: Late Antique Antioch and the Spatial Politics of Religious Controversyd. Oakland: University of California Press. ISBN 9780520303379.
- Taylor, David G. K. (2002). "Bilingualism and Diglossia in Late Antique Syria and Mesopotamia". Bilingualism in Ancient Society: Language Contact and the Written Word. Oxford: Oxford University Press. pp. 298–331. ISBN 9789004264410.
- Taylor, David G. K. (2011). "Syriac Lexicography". Gorgias Encyclopedic Dictionary of the Syriac Heritage. Piscataway, NJ: Gorgias Press. pp. 391–393.
- Toepel, Alexander (2013). "The Cave of Treasures: A new Translation and Introduction". Old Testament Pseudepigrapha: More Noncanonical Scriptures. Vol. 1. Grand Rapids: William B. Eerdmans Publishing Company. pp. 531–584. ISBN 9780802827395.
- Watt, John W. (2009). "Aramaic and Syriac". Concise Encyclopedia of Languages of the World. Oxford: Elsevier. pp. 56–59. ISBN 9780080877754.
- Weninger, Stefan (2012). "Aramaic-Arabic Language Contact". The Semitic Languages: An International Handbook. Berlin-Boston: Walter de Gruyter. pp. 747–755. ISBN 9783110251586.
- Weltecke, Dorothea (2009). "Michael the Syrian and Syriac Orthodox Identity". Church History and Religious Culture. 89 (1–3): 115–125. doi:10.1163/187124109X408023.
- Weltecke, Dorothea; Younansardaroud, Helen (2019). "The Renaissance of Syriac Literature in the Twelfth–Thirteenth Centuries". The Syriac World. London: Routledge. pp. 698–717. ISBN 9781138899018.
- Wilkinson, Robert J. (2019). "The Early Study of Syriac in Europe". The Syriac World. London: Routledge. pp. 751–769. ISBN 9781138899018.
- Wilmshurst, David (2019). "The Church of the East in the 'Abbasid Era". The Syriac World. London: Routledge. pp. 189–201. ISBN 9781138899018.
- Wood, Philip (2019). "Historiography in the Syriac-Speaking World, 300–1000". The Syriac World. London: Routledge. pp. 405–421. ISBN 9781138899018.
