= Yahweh (disambiguation) =

Yahweh is a reconstruction of the name of the God mentioned in the Hebrew Bible. Today, it most commonly refers to God in Judaism or God in Christianity.

Yahweh may also refer to:

== Religion ==
- The Tetragrammaton, the four Hebrew letters YHWH or YHVH, which is believed to have been vocalized as "Yahweh".
- Assemblies of Yahweh, an international religious group based in Bethel, Pennsylvania that uses the Sacred Names Yahweh (God) and Yahshua (Jesus)
- Jah, the God in Rastafarianism
- Jehovah, the God in Jehovah's Witnesses
- House of Yahweh, an American religious group based in Abilene, Texas
- Nation of Yahweh, a black American religious group founded by Yahweh ben Yahweh
  - Yahweh ben Yahweh (Hulon Mitchell Jr., 1935–2007), founder and leader of the Nation of Yahweh
- Yahweh, the extraterrestrial Elohim scientist responsible for creating humanity in the atheistic religion known as Raëlism
- Sacred Name movement, a Christian movement emphasizing use of "Yahweh"

== Music ==
- Yahweh (album), a 2010 album by Hillsong Church, or the title song
- "Yahweh" (song), a 2004 song by U2

== See also ==
- Tetragrammaton (disambiguation)
