= Tetragrammaton (disambiguation) =

The Tetragrammaton is the four-letter scriptural name of the God of Israel.

Tetragrammaton may also refer to:

== Music ==
- Tetragrammaton Records, American record label founded in 1968
- Deep Purple ΙΙΙ, album, often referred as Tetragrammaton, with Hieronymus Bosch's painting on the cover (1969)
- "Tetragrammaton", track on the Mars Volta album Amputechture (2006)
- Tetragrammaton, music-related podcast hosted by Rick Rubin (2024)

== Literature ==
- Tetragrammaton, brain technology in the David Brin novel Kiln People (2002)
- Tetragrammaton Labyrinth, the manga series (2005-08)

== Cinema & television ==
- Tetragrammaton, title of council in the film Equilibrium (2002)

== See also ==
- Tetragram (disambiguation)
- Pentagrammaton (disambiguation)
