= Golan Heights =

Syrian plateau occupied by Israel

Golan Heights هضبة الجولان רָמַת הַגּוֹלָן
- Location of the Golan Heights
- Coordinates: 33°00′N 35°45′E
- Status: Internationally recognized as Syrian territory, occupied by Israel since 1967 (Note: In 2008, a plenary session of the United Nations General Assembly voted by 161–1 in favour of a motion on the "occupied Syrian Golan" that reaffirmed support for UN Resolution 497.) (Note: see Status of the Golan Heights); Recognized as Israeli territory by 3 UN member states (Note: Israel, the United States since 2019, and Colombia since 2026)
- Claimed by: Israel; Syria
- Occupied by: Israel

Area
  - Total: 1,800 km^{2} (690 sq mi)
- Highest elevation: 2,814 m (9,232 ft)
- Lowest elevation: −212 m (−696 ft)

Population
  - Total: ~63,000
  - Israeli settlers: 31,000
  - Druze: 29,364 (Note: Roughly 40% of Druze across the four main Druze towns in the Golan Heights have taken Israeli citizenship as of March 2026)

Time zones
- Golan Heights (Israeli-administered area): UTC+2
  - Summer (DST): UTC+3 (IDT)
- Remaining parts of the Golan Heights: UTC+3 (AST)

The Golan Heights, (Note: Arabic: هَضْبَة ٱلْجَوْلَان, romanized: Haḍbat al-Jawlān; Hebrew: רָמַת הַגּוֹלָן, romanized: Ramát ha-Golán.) or simply the Golan, is a basaltic plateau at the southwest corner of Syria, the majority of which has been occupied and administered by Israel since the 1967 Six-Day War. It is bordered by the Yarmouk River in the south, the Sea of Galilee and Hula Valley in the west, the Anti-Lebanon Mountains with Mount Hermon in the north and Wadi Raqqad (Ruqqad) in the east, with an alternative definition having it stretch further east, up to Wadi 'Allan. It hosts vital water sources that feed the Hasbani River and the Jordan River. Two thirds of the area was depopulated following the 1967 Six-Day War and later effectively annexed in 1981. In 2019, during the first Trump administration, the United States became the first country to recognize the Golan Heights as part of Israel. In 2026, Colombia became the second to do so. Apart from these two, no other UN member state has formally recognized Israeli sovereignty over the territory, and the international community largely considers it Syrian land under occupation. In late 2024, amid the collapse of the Assad regime and the Syrian government's control, Israeli forces entered and took control of the United Nations‑monitored demilitarized buffer zone on the Syrian-controlled side of the Golan Heights.

The earliest evidence of human habitation on the Golan dates to the Upper Paleolithic period. The plateau was home to the biblical Geshur, and was later incorporated into Aram-Damascus, before being ruled by several foreign and domestic powers, including the Assyrians, Babylonians, Persians, Itureans, Hasmoneans, Romans, Ghassanids, several caliphates, and the Mamluk Sultanate. It was ruled by the Ottoman Empire from the 16th century until its collapse, and subsequently became part of the French Mandate in Syria and the State of Damascus in 1923. When the mandate terminated in 1946, it became part of the newly independent Syrian Arab Republic, spanning about 1,800 km^{2} (690 sq mi).

Israeli forces invaded and occupied the Golan Heights during the Six-Day War, and Syria dismissed any negotiations with Israel as part of the Khartoum Resolution at the 1967 Arab League summit. Civil administration of a third of the Golan Heights, including the capital Quneitra, was restored to Syria in a disengagement agreement the year after the 1973 Yom Kippur War. Construction of Israeli settlements began in the territory held by Israel, which was under a military administration until the Knesset passed the Golan Heights Law in 1981, which applied Israeli law to the territory; this move has been described as an annexation and was condemned as illegal by the United Nations Security Council in Resolution 497. (Note: The resolution stated: "the Israeli decision to impose its laws, jurisdiction, and administration in the occupied Syrian Golan Heights is null and void and without international legal effect".)

After the onset of the Syrian civil war in 2011, control of the Syrian-administered part of the Golan Heights was split between the state government and Syrian opposition forces, with the United Nations Disengagement Observer Force (UNDOF) maintaining a 266 km^{2} (103 sq mi) buffer zone in between to help implement the Israeli–Syrian ceasefire across the Purple Line. From 2012 to 2018, the eastern half of the Golan Heights became a scene of repeated battles between the Syrian Army, rebel factions of the Syrian opposition (including the Southern Front) as well as various jihadist organizations such as al-Nusra Front and the Khalid ibn al-Walid Army. In July 2018, the Syrian government regained full control over the eastern Golan Heights. After the fall of the Assad regime in December 2024, Israel occupied the demilitarized buffer zone in the Golan Heights as a "temporary defensive position", followed by two additional Syrian villages, Jamlah and Maaraba.

== Etymology ==
The name Golan first appears in the Hebrew Bible as a city in Bashan. The Greek form Gaulanitis emerged as the name for an administrative region in the 3rd century BCE, and its linguistic cognates continued to be used for an administrative division in the region ever since. The borders of what was called Golan in classical or medieval sources are known to have varied over time. The name Golan Heights was not used in English before the 19th century.

=== Biblical city ===
The Hebrew Bible mentions Golan (גּוֹלָן) as a city in the territory allotted to the half-tribe of Manasseh in Bashan, designated as one of the six Cities of Refuge (Deut. 4:43 וְאֶת־גּוֹלָן בַּבָּשָׁן לַמְנַשִּׁי "and Golan, in Bashan, belonging to the Manassites"; Josh. 20:8 וְאֶת־גּוֹלָן בַּבָּשָׁן מִמַּטֵּה מְנַשֶּׁה "and Golan in Bashan from the tribe of Manasseh"; and Josh. 21:27/1Chron. 6:56 (Note: The Masoretic Text of the Hebrew Bible numbers this as chapter 6 verse 56 of 1 Chronicles, while the King James Version and other Christian texts lists it as verse 71) אֶת־גּוֹלָן בַּבָּשָׁן וְאֶת־מִגְרָשֶׁיהָ "Golan in Bashan with its pasturelands"). The Tosefta (Makkot 3:2) pairs Golan with Kedesh: "Three cities Joshua set apart in the land of Canaan, and they were set opposite three beyond the Jordan, like two rows of a vineyard . . . Kedesh in Galilee opposite Golan in Bashan." The ketiv at Joshua is גלון *Galon, a pronunciation also seen in the Septuagint as Γαυλων, Γελων. Flinders Petrie interpreted the word Golan as meaning "something surrounded, hence a district".

=== Golan as a region ===
The first references to Golan as a region emerge following the 322 BCE conquest of Alexander the Great, with Gaulanitis forming an administrative area under the rule of Ptolemaic empire and then the Seleucids beginning in 200 BCE.

Mishnaic Hebrew הגבלן the Gavlan (c. 100 CE) and Jewish Palestinian Aramaic גובלנא, גוולנה Guvlana, where the -a suffix may be the definite article for a meaning of the Guvlan, describe a region or city in the same area. JPA יבלונה Yavlona, identified with Guvlana by scholars, is the subject of c. 375 CE Talmudic debate over its inclusion in the Land of Israel. The Mishnaic and Aramaic forms of this name may reflect Greek influence.

Gaulanitis in its 1st-century context.

In addition to the city of Golan (Γαυλάνην), Flavius Josephus describes "Gaulanitis" (Γαυλανῖτις), a territory containing the towns of Gamla (or Jamla) and Bethsaida in its "Lower" part, Sogane (Σωγανή, possibly Khirbet Sujan or Sakhnin) in its "Upper" part, and also Solyma (Σολύμης, unidentified), Gabala (Γάβαλα, גבלא), and Seleucia (Σελεύκειος, unidentified). Some scholars believe that the "Upper" Gaulanitis was north of the "Lower", differentiated by a political boundary, while others say it was merely higher in elevation. Josephus writes that the Galilee is bordered by Gaulanitis to its east, but he also refers to Judas of Galilee as "Judas the Gaulanite (Γαυλανίτης, Eus^{Syr} ܓܘܠܘܢܝܐ (Note: Eus^{Arm}: գալիլեացի, "the Galilean".)) of Gamla", indicating that Gaulanitis and Galilee overlapped. His account likely reflects Roman administrative changes implemented after the Great Jewish Revolt (66–73 CE), although the suffix -itis probably dates to the Ptolemaic era (305-30 BCE).

Eusebius (c. 300) describes that "the region around Golan (Γαυλὼν (Note: This spelling may reflect the ketiv at Joshua or an equivalent version of LXX, possibly by influence of Eusebius' Jewish assistants. See Urman, Dan (1985). The Golan. p. 14.)) in Batanaea shares its name", and a writer as late as Gregory of Cyprus (c. 500) mentions a "rural region of Golan (Κλίµα Γαυλάµης)".

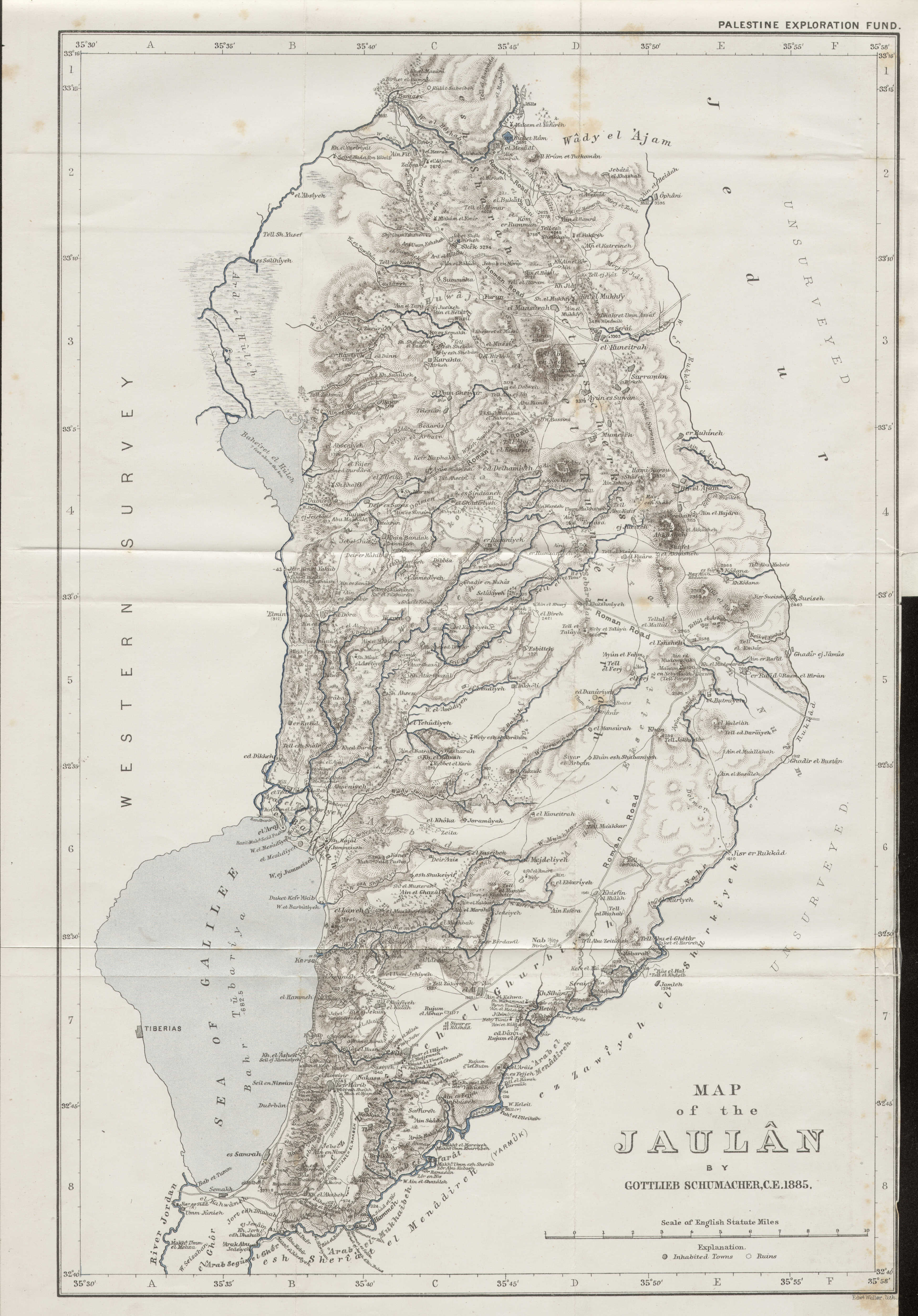
Gottlieb Schumacher’s 1885 map of the Golan region

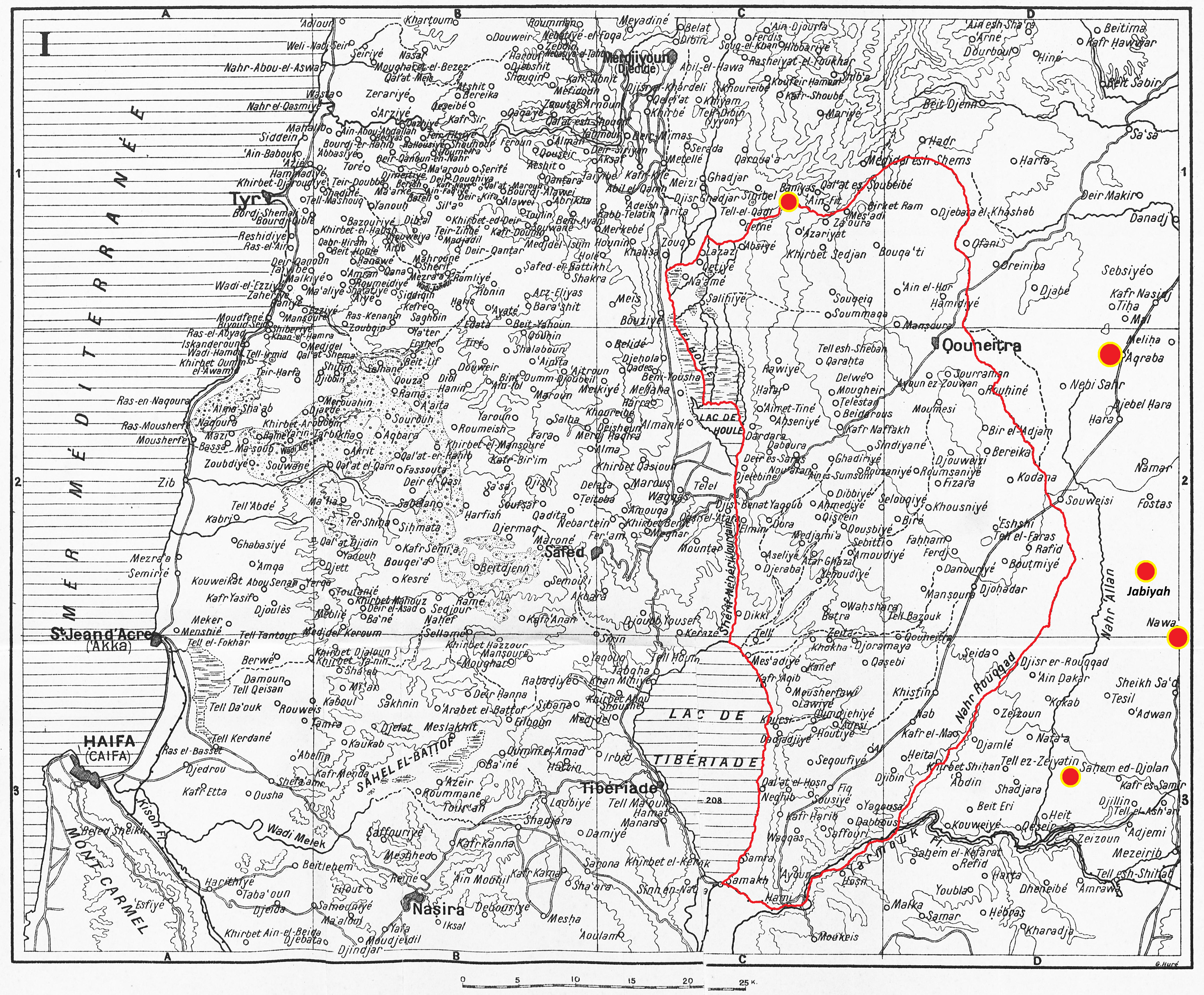
Rene Dussaud's map of Jawlān, with his proposed borders and markers for the cities in Jawlan mentioned by medieval writers.

The Arabized form Jawlān (الجولان, sometimes romanized Djolan) was in use prior to the Muslim conquest of Syria, and appears in the poetry of Al-Nabigha and Hassan ibn Thabit (c. 600) who served in the courts of the Ghassanids. Both write of "Ḥārith al-Jawlān (حارث الجولان)"; referring to a "mountain" (see below), and Hassan ibn Thabit also uses it to refer to the "peaks of the Golan", but more generally as a region as well, calling their capital at Jabiyah, Jābiyat al-Jawlan (i.e. "Jabiyah of the Golan"). In later Arabic texts it continued to be used to refer to a "mountain" or region somewhat east and north of Goulanitis or the modern Golan Heights, containing Jabiyah, Aqraba, and Burqat Ajwal; its capital was Banias according to Al-Ya'qubi (891), and Nawa, sat at its eastern edge, according to Al-Nawawi (c. 1250). Al-Jawhari and Abu Mansur al-Azhari (c. 975) mention a "land" called Jawlan, and Ibn al-Faqih (c. 900), Al-Maqdisi (985), Nasr al-Iskandari (c. 1150), and Al-Dimashqi (c. 1300) knew Jawlan as a "district of Damascus". Al-Nawawi writes that "Jawlan contains around 200 villages. Its width is a day's journey, and its length is somewhat more". René Dussaud posits that Jawlan stretched from the Jordan River to the Ruqqad, (Note: Maps from the early 19th century show Wadi or Nahr Ruqqad to the east of Nawa. On modern maps like Dussaud's, Ruqqad corresponds to the former Wadi Hamy Sakhar.) and from the Yarmouk River to Banias.

In 1826, Jawlan was said to refer to part of the Jedur plain. In 1885, Gottlieb Schumacher described an area of 560 square miles, corresponding to the modern Golan Heights:

The entire area of modern Jaulân, including ez Zawîyeh esh-Shurkîyeh and Sha'rah in the north, is about 560 square miles. By the Jaulân is meant only the high plateau and a part of its declivity, viz., the north-west portion sloping from the Huleh marshes: and bounded in the west by Jordan, south-west by the Lake of Tiberias, north by the declivities of Hermon and the Wâdy el-Adjam, north-east by Jedur or Nahr er-Rukkád, and east and south by Haurân or the Nahr el-Allân, and in the south by 'Ajlûn or the River Yarmuk.
Politically, the Jaulân forms one of the administrative districts (Kaimakâmîyeh) of the Sanjak or the Liva of Haurân (with the seat of government of a Kaimakam in el-Kuneitrah), and as such is under the Mutasarrif of the Haurân at Sheikh Sa'ad.

Its border was moved east in 1883 to the Nahr al-Allan, including Saham al-Jawlan, and west in 1884, to exclude it.

=== Golan as a mountain ===
Explaining the pre-Islamic mentions of "Harith al-Jawlan", Ibn Duraid (c. 900) and Ibn Sidah (c. 1050) write, "Jawlan is a well-known mountain in Syria, also called Harith al-Jawlan", with Al-Jawhari (c. 1000) identifying Harith as "one of its peaks". Al-Nawawi writes that Jawlan is a region, and that "Harith al-Jawlan" is either a mountain or a man located there. Yaqut al-Hamawi (c. 1200) records both a "village" and a "mountain near Damascus" named Jawlan. In modern times, Harith al-Jawlan has been linked to Tell al-Hara and to the home of "Theodore, abbot of Abbas Marcellin [Abbey] of Mt. Hartha (ܛܘܪܐ ܕܚܪܬܐ)" who signed the Letter of the Archimandrites of Arabia in 570 CE. Irfan Shahîd further links the monastery to the Ghassanids, and says the mountain was named for the Ghassanid king Harith ibn Jabalah, and the tomb of the last Ghassanid king, Nu'man bin Harith, is said by Al-Nabigha to be there.

The Jerusalemite geographer Al-Maqdisi (c. 975) refers to Jawlan as a region, but also describes it as one of the Jibāl al-Sharifa (جبال الشريفة, "noble mountains" or "holy mountains") of the holy land (al ard al-muqaddasah). It is not clear whether this terminology was borrowed from Christians who referred to Mount Athos by the Greek honorific ἄγιον ὅρος, "holy mountain". What is clear is that there were many Christian holy sites in the Golan surrounding Mount Hermon connected to events involving Jesus and the Apostles, and the Ghassanids' extensive building of monasteries and martyria in the area contributed to its reputation as a holy height, and that this tradition persisted into the Islamic era. Al-Maqdisi records meeting a community of forty Muslim ascetics in the Golan led by a Thawri scholar named Ishaq al-Balluti (اسحاق البلوطى), who wore wool and subsisted on acorns (بالبلوط al-ballūṭ), a practice shared by Byzantine monks before them.

== History ==
=== Prehistory ===
The Venus of Berekhat Ram, a pebble from the Lower Paleolithic era found in the Golan Heights, may have been carved by Homo erectus between 700,000 and 230,000 BCE.

=== Bronze Age ===
The southern Golan saw a rise in settlements from the 2nd millennium BCE onwards. These were small settlements located on the slopes overlooking the Sea of Galilee or nearby gorges. They may correspond to the "cities of the Land of Ga[šu]ru" mentioned in Amarna Letter #256.5, written by the prince of Pihilu (Pella). This suggests a different form of political organization compared to the prevalent city-states of the region, such as Hatzor to the west and Ashteroth to the east. The Golan had numerous settlements in the Middle Bronze Age until they were largely destroyed by Egyptian Pharaoh Thutmose III in the mid 2nd millennium BCE. Following this, the level of habitation in the area decreased.

=== Iron Age ===
Following the Late Bronze Age collapse, the kingdom of Geshur emerged from the Golan, likely a continuation of the earlier "Land of Garu". The Hebrew Bible mentions it as a distinct entity during the reign of David (10th century BCE). David's marriage to Maacha, daughter of Talmai, the king of Geshur, supports a dynastic alliance with Israel. However, by the mid-9th century BCE, Aram-Damascus absorbed Geshur into its expanding territory. Aram-Damascus' rivalry with the Kingdom of Israel led to numerous military clashes in the Golan and Gilead regions throughout the 9th and 8th centuries BCE. In the Books of Kings (1 Kings 20:26–30), the Bible recounts how Ahab, king of Israel, defeated Ben-Hadad I of Damascus at Aphek, a location possibly corresponding to the modern-day Afik, near the Sea of Galilee.

=== Assyrian, Babylonian, and Persian periods ===
During the 8th century BCE, the Assyrians conquered the region, incorporating it into the province of Qarnayim, likely including Damascus as well. This period was succeeded by the Babylonian and the Achaemenid Empire. According to the Mosaic of Rehob, the Achaemenid Empire allowed the region to be resettled by returning Jewish exiles from the Babylonian Captivity in the 5th century BCE. Archaeological surveys have found no remains indicating any kind of habitation between the 6th and 3rd centuries BCE.

=== Hellenistic and early Roman periods ===
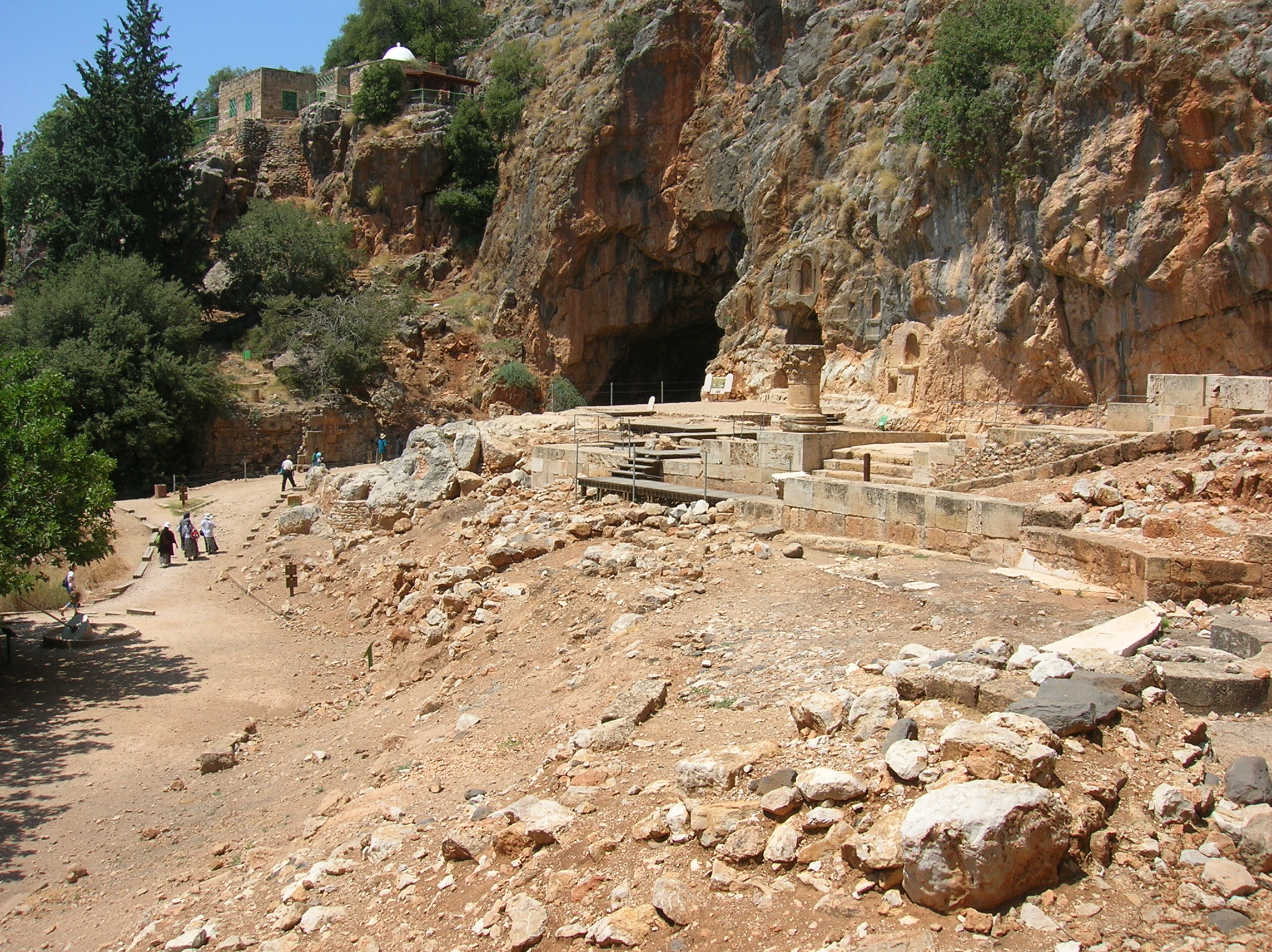
Temple of Pan at Banias and the white-domed shrine of Nabi Khadr in the background

The Golan Heights, along with the rest of the region, came under the control of Alexander the Great in 332 BCE, following the Battle of Issus. Following Alexander's death, the Golan came under the domination of the Macedonian general Seleucus and remained part of the Seleucid Empire for most of the next two centuries. In the middle of the 2nd century BCE, Itureans moved into the Golan, occupying more than one hundred locations in the region. Iturean stones and pottery have been found in the area. Itureans also built several temples, one of them in function up until the Islamic conquest.

Around 83–81 BCE, the Golan was captured by the Hasmonean king and high priest Alexander Jannaeus, annexing the area to the Hasmonean kingdom of Judaea. Following this conquest, the Hasmoneans encouraged Jewish migrants from Judea to settle in the Golan. Most scholars agree that this settlement began after the Hasmonean conquest, though it might have started earlier, probably in the mid-2nd century BCE. Over the next century, Jewish settlement in the Golan and nearby regions became widespread, reaching north to Damascus and east to Naveh.

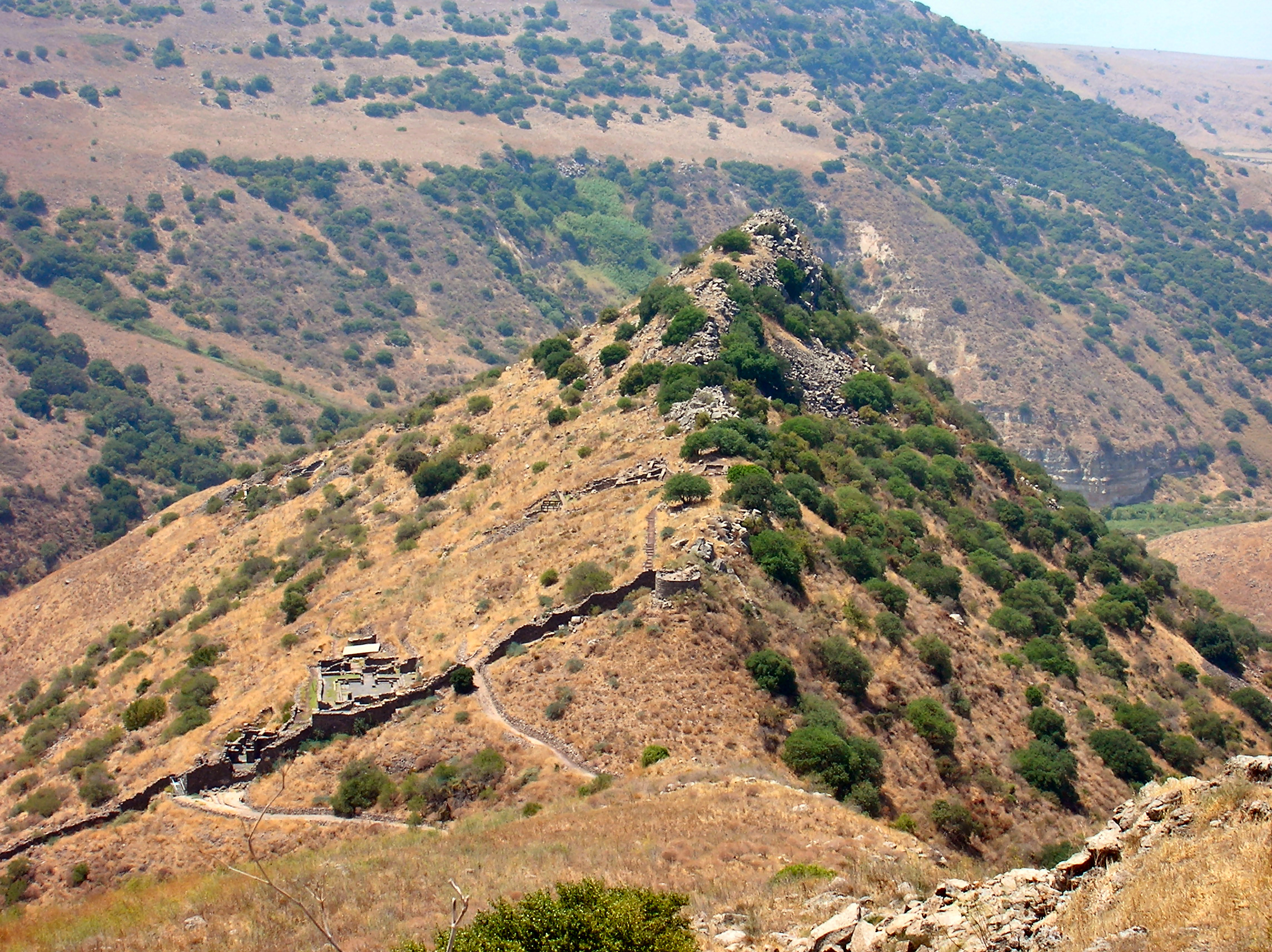
Ruins of the ancient Jewish city of Gamla, home to one of the earliest known synagogues. The city was besieged and destroyed by the Romans in 71 CE, during the First Jewish–Roman War.

When Herod the Great ascended to power in Judaea during the latter half of the first century BCE, the region as far as Trachonitis, Batanea and Auranitis was put under his control by Augustus Caesar. Following Herod's death in 4 BCE, Augustus Caesar adjudicated that the Golan fell within the Tetrarchy of Herod's son, Herod Philip I. The capital of Jewish Galaunitis, Gamla, was a prominent city and major stronghold. It housed one of the earliest known synagogues, believed to have been constructed in the late 1st century BC, while the Temple in Jerusalem was still standing.

After Philip's death in 34 CE, the Romans absorbed the Golan into the province of Syria, but Caligula restored the territory to Herod's grandson Agrippa in 37. Following Agrippa's death in 44, the Romans again annexed the Golan to Syria, promptly to return it again when Claudius granted control of the Golan to Agrippa II, the son of Agrippa I, in 53.

By the time of the Great Jewish revolt, which began in 66 CE, part of the Golan Heights was predominantly inhabited by Jews. According to the account of Josephus, the western and central Golan were densely populated with cities that emerged on fertile stony soil. After the Roman suppression of the Jews during the First Jewish–Roman War of the 60s and 70s CE and following the destruction of Jerusalem in 70 CE, many Jews sought refuge to the north of Jerusalem, fleeing to Galilee and the Golan, further increasing the Jewish population in the region. During this time, Jews remained a minority of the population in the Golan. Despite nominally being under Agrippa's control and situated outside the province of Judaea, the Jewish communities in the area participated in the revolt. Initially, Gamla was loyal to Rome, but later the town switched allegiance and even minted its own revolt coins. Josephus, who was appointed by the provisional government in Jerusalem as commander of Galilee, fortified the cities of Sogana, Seleucia, and Gamla in the Golan. The Roman military, under Vespasian's command, eventually ended the northern revolt in 67 CE by capturing Gamla after a siege. Josephus reports that the people of Gamla opted for mass suicide, throwing themselves into a ravine. Today, the visible breach in the wall near the synagogue, along with remnants such as fortress walls, tower ruins, armor fragments, various projectiles, and fire damage, testify to the siege's intensity. Jews again sought refuge in the Golan after the suppression in the aftermath of the Bar Kokhba revolt in 135 CE, which increased the Jewish population in the region significantly.

From 93 CE, the Paneas region forming the north of the Golan belonged to the province of Phoenice. Based on Ptolemy's Geography (c. 150 CE), the western portions of the Golan, including the regions of Hippos and Gaulanitis, were part of Syria Palaestina, the new province which replaced Judaea after Bar Kokhba's revolt. The eastern parts belong to the province of Arabia Petraea, established in 106 CE.

By the close of the second century, Judah ha-Nasi was granted a lease for 2,000 units of land in the Golan. An excavation at Hippos discovered a Roman road that connected the Sea of Galilee with the city of Nawa in Syria.

=== Late Roman and Byzantine periods ===
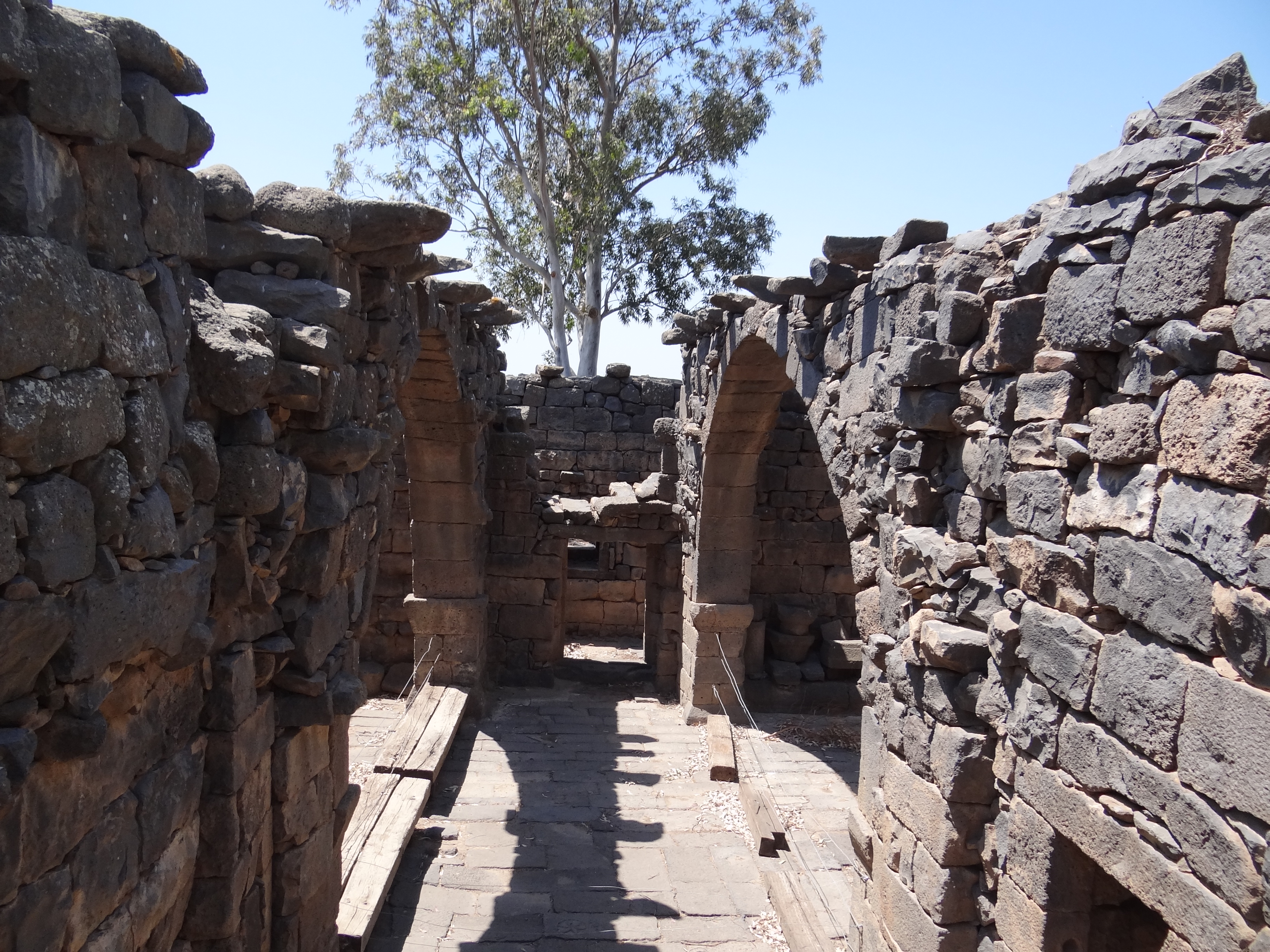
Church of Deir Qeruh

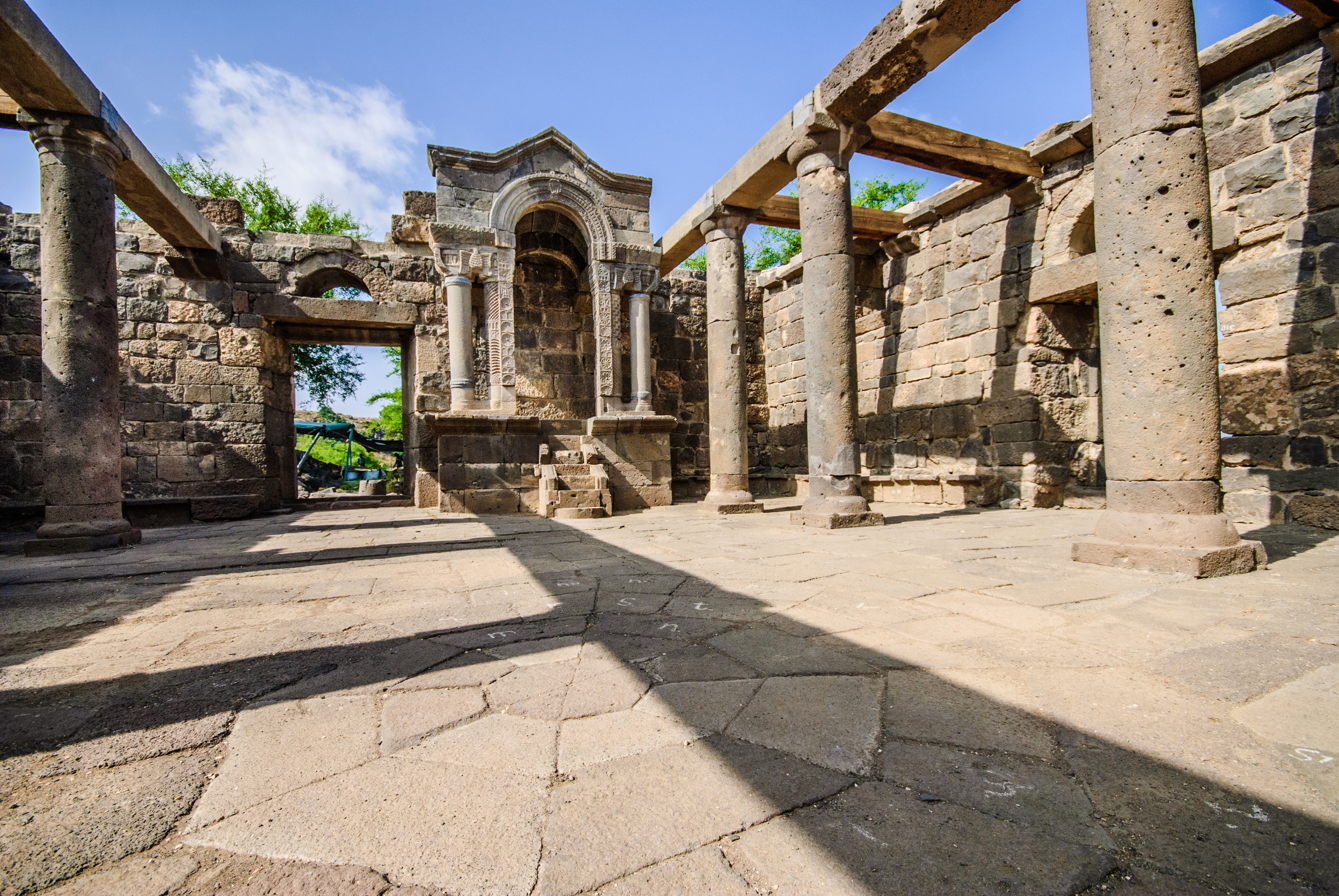
Reconstructed synagogue at Umm el-Qanatir

In the later Roman and Byzantine periods, the area was administered as part of Phoenicia Prima and Syria Palaestina, and finally Golan/Gaulanitis was included together with Peraea in Palaestina Secunda, after 218 CE. The area of the ancient kingdom of Bashan was incorporated into the province of Batanea.

The Golan preserves a notable group of Diocletianic boundary stones, which document village demarcations from the late third and early fourth centuries CE.

The political and economic recovery of Palestine during the reigns of Diocletian and Constantine, in the late 3rd and early 4th centuries CE, led to a resurgence of Jewish life in the Golan. Excavations at various synagogue sites have uncovered ceramics and coins that provide evidence of this resettlement. During this period, several synagogues were constructed, and today 25 locations with ancient synagogues or their remnants have been discovered, all situated in the central Golan. Excavations at Ein Nashut provide evidence of a Jewish community and a synagogue that operated from the 5th century CE to the 7th century CE. Other synagogues, built from the abundant basalt stones of the region, were influenced by those in the Galilee but exhibited their own distinctive characteristics; prominent examples include Umm el-Qanatir, Qatzrin and Deir Aziz. Some of the early Jerusalem Talmud tractates may have been arranged and edited during this period in Qatzrin. Several sites in the Golan show evidence of destruction from the Jewish revolt against Gallus in 351 CE. However, some of these sites were later rebuilt and continued to be inhabited in subsequent centuries.

In the 5th century CE, the Byzantine Empire assigned the Ghassanids, a Christian Arab tribe that had long settled in Syria, the task of protecting its eastern borders against the Sasanian-allied Arab tribe, the Lakhmids. The Ghassanids had emigrated from Yemen in the third century and actively supported Byzantium against Persia. They were initially nomadic but gradually became semi-sedentary, and adopted Christianity along with a number of Arab tribes situated in the borders of the Byzantine Empire in the 3rd and 4th centuries. The Ghassanids had adopted Monophysitism in the 5th century. At the end of the 5th century, the primary Ghassanid encampments in the Golan were Jabiyah and Jawlan, situated in the eastern Golan beyond the Ruqqad. The Ghassanids settled deep inside the Byzantine limes, and in a Syriac source for July 519, they are attested as having their "opulent" headquarters in the eastern Gaulanitis. Like the Herodian dynasty before them, the Ghassanids ruled as a client state of Rome – this time, the Christianized Eastern Roman Empire, or Byzantium. In 529, Emperor Justinian appointed al-Harith ibn Jabalah as Phylarch, making him the leader of all Arab tribes and bestowing upon him the title of Patricius, ranking just below the Emperor.

Arab Christians became the majority in the Golan with the arrival of the Ghassanids to the region. In 377 CE, a sanctuary for John the Baptist was established in the Golan village of Er-Ramthaniyye. The sanctuary was often visited by the Ghassanids.

By the 6th century, the Golan's population had grown and peaked, inhabited by a religiously diverse population of Jews, pagans and Ghassanid Christians, the majority of whom were engaged in agriculture and living in villages and farmsteads. Local synagogues may have been funded by the prosperous production of olive oil. A monastery and church dedicated to Saint George has been found in the Byzantine village of Deir Qeruh in the Golan, located near Gamla. The church has a square apse - a feature known from ancient Syria and Jordan, but not present in churches west of the Jordan River.

The Ghassanids were able to hold on to the Golan until the Sassanid invasion of 614. Following a brief restoration under the Emperor Heraclius, the Golan again fell, this time to the invading Muslim Arabs after the Battle of the Yarmuk in 636. Data from surveys and excavations combined show that the bulk of sites in the Golan were abandoned between the late 6th and early 7th century as a result of military incursions, the breakdown of law and order, and the economy brought on by the weakening of the Byzantine rule. Some settlements lasted till the end of the Umayyad era.

=== Early Muslim period ===
After the Battle of Yarmouk, Muawiyah I, a member of Muhammad's tribe, the Quraish, was appointed governor of Syria, including the Golan. Following the assassination of his cousin, the Caliph Uthman, Muawiya claimed the Caliphate for himself, initiating the Umayyad dynasty. Over the next few centuries, while remaining in Muslim hands, the Golan passed through many dynastic changes, falling first to the Abbasids, then to the Shi'ite Fatimids, then to the Seljuk Turks.

An earthquake in 746 devastated the Jewish village of Katzrin. Following it, there was a brief period of greatly diminished occupation during the Abbasid period (approximately 750–878). Jewish communities persisted at least into the Middle Ages in the towns of Fiq in the southern Golan and Nawa in Batanaea.

For many centuries nomadic tribes lived together with the sedentary population in the region. At times, the central government attempted to settle the nomads which would result in the establishment of permanent communities. When the power of the governing regime declined, as happened during the early Muslim period, nomadic trends increased and many of the rural agricultural villages were abandoned due to harassment from the Bedouins.

=== Crusader/Ayyubid period ===
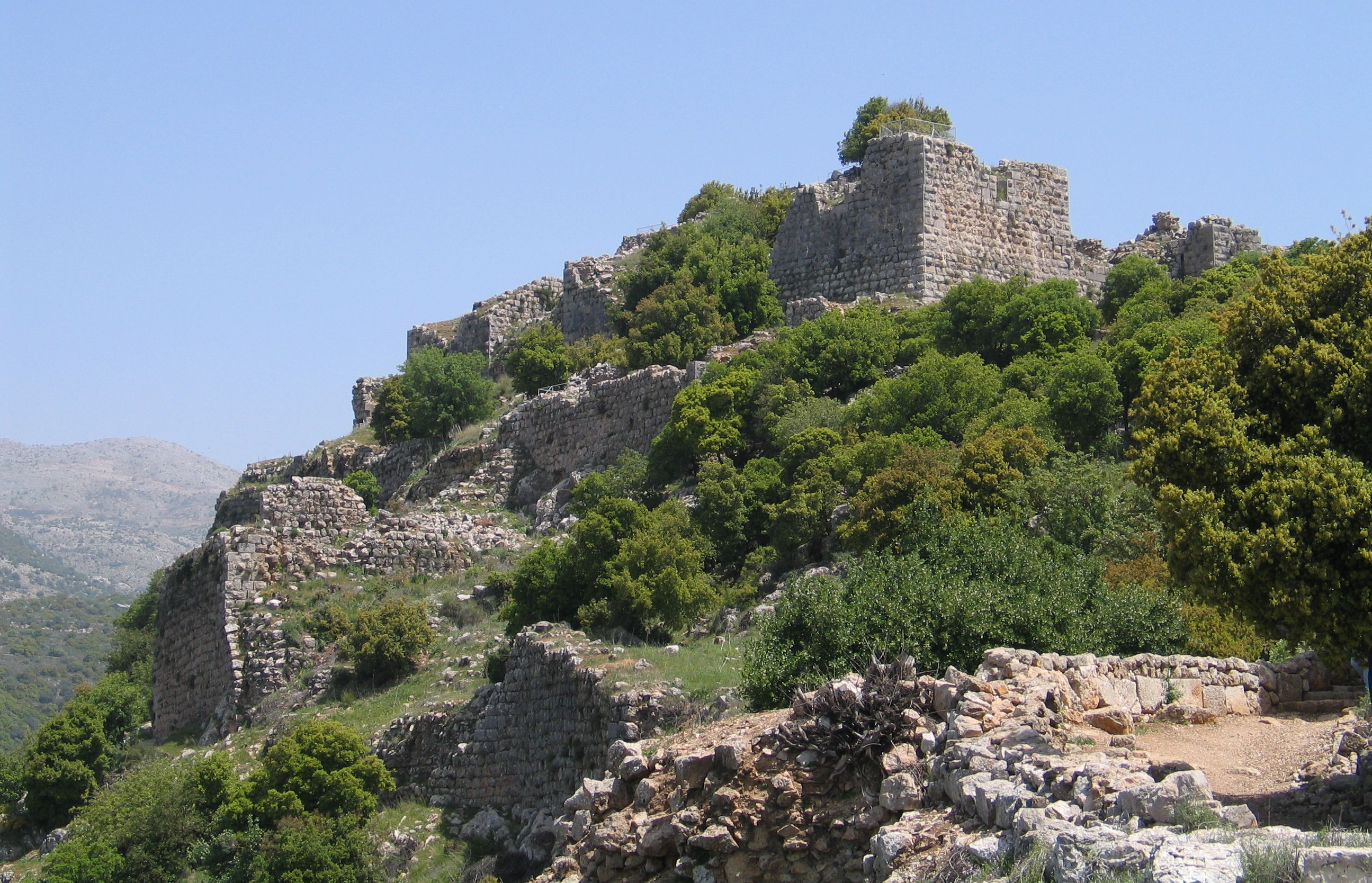
Nimrod Fortress, built by the Ayyubids and hugely enlarged by the Mamluks

During the Crusades, the Golan's elevated terrain posed a significant challenge to the Crusader armies, although the Crusader forces held the strategically important town of Banias twice, in 1128–32 and 1140–64. After victories by Sultan Nur ad-Din Zangi, it was the Kurdish dynasty of the Ayyubids under Sultan Saladin who ruled the area. The Mongols swept through in 1259, but were driven off by the Mamluk commander and future sultan Qutuz at the Battle of Ain Jalut in 1260.

The victory at Ain Jalut allowed the Mamluks to focus their attention to eliminating the last of the Crusader strongholds and ensured their dominance of the region for the next 250 years.

Evidence of agricultural villages producing dibs (grape syrup) during this period and continuing into the early Ottoman era has been found in archaeological excavations in As-Summaqah. Ibn Shahin al-Zahiri writing in the fifteenth century records the number of villages in the Golan at his time at 360, and archaeological surveys have catalogued traces of over 300 of these. With the expansion of the Mamluk's barid (postal) system, the route between Damascus and Safed, two main administrative capitals under Mamluk rule, ran through the Golan and several caravanserais were established to service increased traffic along this essential route.

=== Ottoman period ===
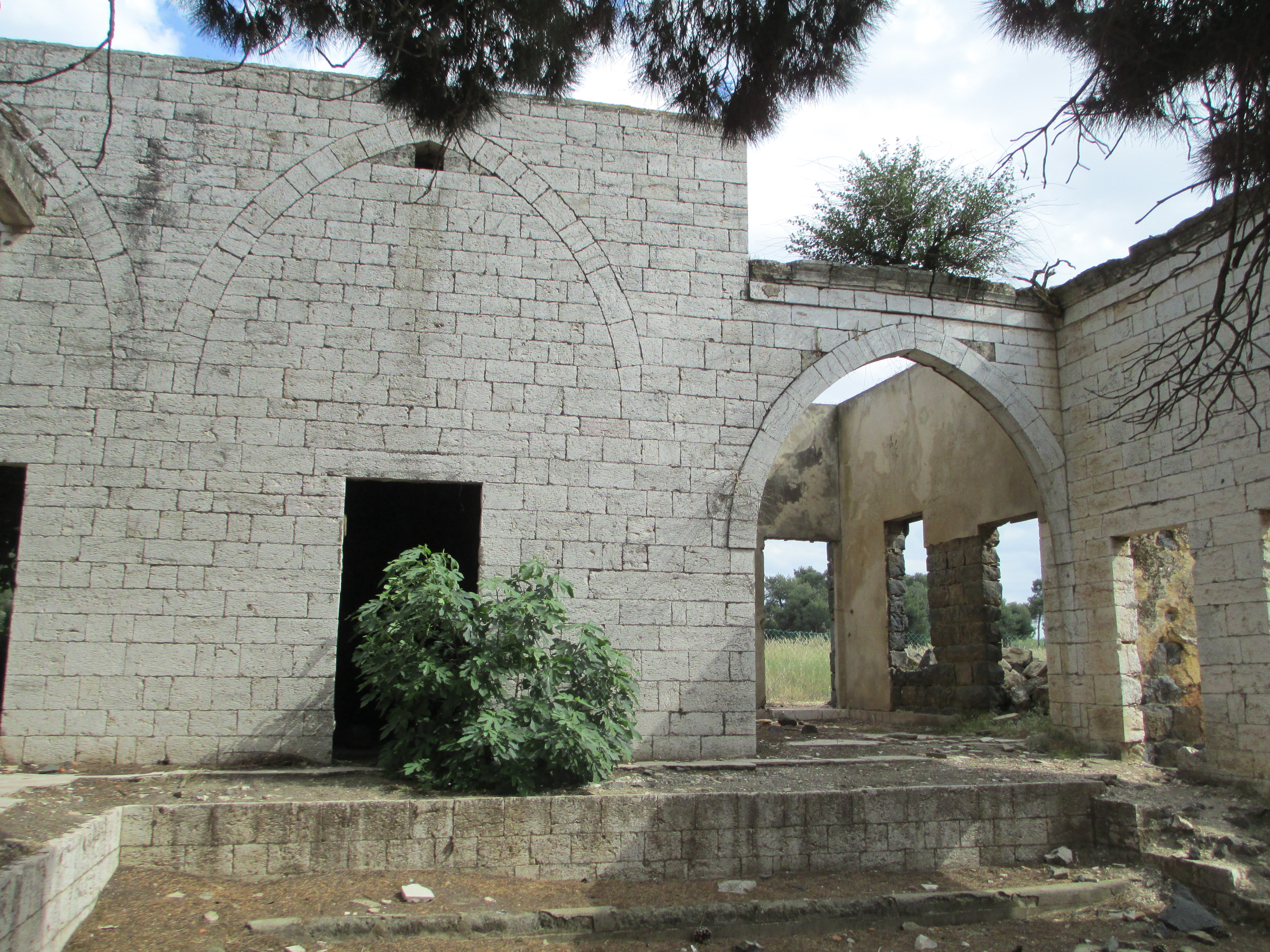
The palace of Emir Mahmoud Al Faour of the Al Fadl tribe in the Golan Heights.

In the 16th century, the Ottoman Turks conquered Syria. During this time, the Golan formed part of the Hauran Sanjak. During the 1560s, Ottoman official Mustafa Lala Pasha established al-Qunaytira as an important regional center, building a caravanserai, a mosque and shops, and endowing them with properties in dozens of villages around the Golan.

Some Druze communities were established in the Golan during the 17th and 18th centuries. The villages were abandoned during previous periods due to raids by Bedouin tribes were not resettled until the second half of the 19th century.

Throughout the 18th century, the Al Fadl, an Arab tribe long established in the Levant, struggled against Turkmen and Kurdish tribesmen over control of the Golan. The Fadl's presence in the Golan was observed by Burckhardt in the early 19th century.

Transhumance in the Golan remained a long-lasting phenomenon because of the region's harsh winters. The winters "forced tribespeople until the 19th century to live in hundreds of rudimentary 'winter villages' in their tribal territory." Starting in the second part of the 19th century, the villages became "fixed and formed the nucleus of fully sedentary life in the 20th century Golan."

In 1868, the region was described as "almost entirely desolate". According to a travel handbook of the time, only 11 of 127 ancient towns and villages in the Golan were inhabited. By the late 19th century, the Golan Heights was mostly inhabited by Arabs, Turkmen and Circassians. The Circassians, part of a large influx of refugees from the Caucasus into the empire as a result of the Russo-Turkish War of 1877–78, were encouraged to settle in the Golan by the Ottoman authorities. They were granted lands with a 12-year tax exemption. The Al Fadl, the Druze and the Circassians were often in conflict for local dominance. These struggles subsided with the Ottoman government's formal recognition of the Al Fadl's tribal territory and pasturelands in the Golan, which were invested in the name of the tribe's emir. The emir relocated to Damascus and collected rents from his tribesmen who thereafter settled in the area and engaged in a combination of farming and pastoralism. The tribe settled in several villages in the area and controlled important roads to Damascus, Galilee and Lebanon. In the 19th century the tribe continued to expand their territory in the Golan and built two palaces. The leader of the tribe joined Prince Faisal during the Arab revolt, and they supported the uprising against the French in the northern Golan.

In 1885, civil engineer and architect, Gottlieb Schumacher, conducted a survey of the entire Golan Heights on behalf of the German Society for the Exploration of the Holy Land, publishing his findings in a map and book entitled The Jaulân.

==== Modern Jewish settlement ====
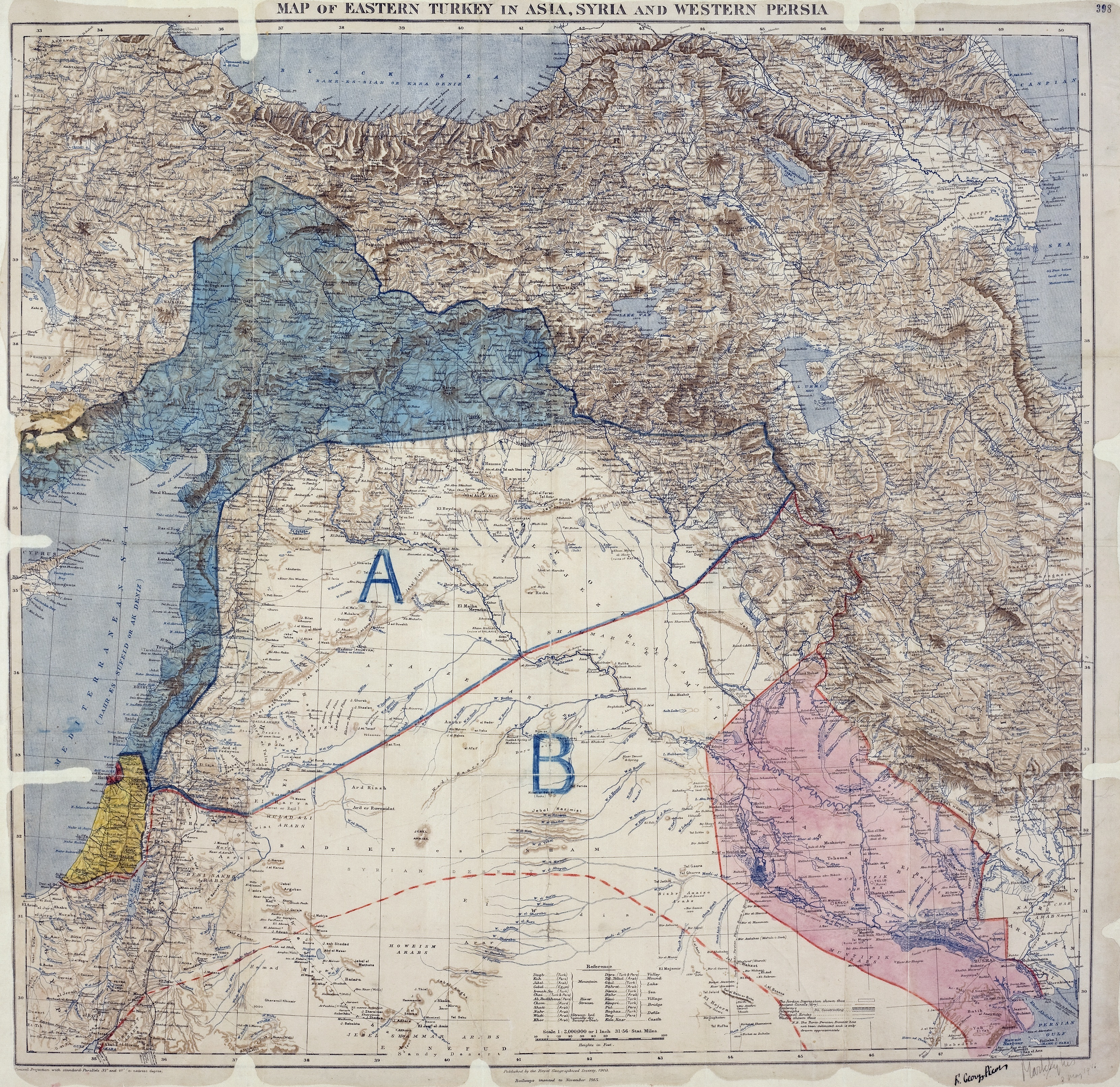
Sykes–Picot Agreement map, signed 8 May 1916, showing the Golan Heights in area "A", an independent Arab state in the French sphere of influence

In 1880, Laurence Oliphant published Eretz ha-Gilad (The Land of Gilead), which described a plan for large-scale Jewish settlement in the Golan. In 1884, there were still open stretches of uncultivated land between villages in the lower Golan, but by the mid-1890s most were owned and cultivated. Some land had been purchased in the Golan and Hawran by Zionist associations based in Romania, Bulgaria, the United States and England, in the late 19th century and early 20th century. In the winter of 1885, members of the Old Yishuv in Safed formed the Beit Yehuda Society and purchased 15,000 dunams (15 km^{2}; 5.8 sq mi) of land from the village of Ramthaniye in the central Golan.

Soon afterwards, the society regrouped and purchased 2,000 dunams (2.0 km^{2}; 0.77 sq mi) of land from the village of Bir e-Shagum on the western slopes of the Golan. The village they established, Bnei Yehuda, existed until 1920. The last families left in the wake of the Passover riots of 1920. In 1944, the Jewish National Fund bought the Bnei Yehuda lands from their Jewish owners, but a later attempt to establish Jewish ownership of the property in Bir e-Shagum through the courts was not successful.

Between 1891 and 1894, Baron Edmond James de Rothschild purchased around 150,000 dunams (150 km^{2}; 58 sq mi) of land in the Golan and the Hawran for Jewish settlement. Legal and political permits were secured and ownership of the land was registered in late 1894. The Jews also built a road stretching from Lake Hula to Muzayrib. The Agudat Ahim society, whose headquarters were in Yekaterinoslav, Russia, acquired 100,000 dunams (100 km^{2}; 39 sq mi) of land in several locations in the districts of Fiq and Daraa. A plant nursery was established and work began on farm buildings in Jillin. A village called Tiferet Binyamin was established on lands purchased from Saham al-Jawlan by the Shavei Zion Association based in New York, but the project was abandoned after a year when the Turks issued an edict in 1896 evicting the 17 non-Turkish families. A later attempt to resettle the site with Syrian Jews who were Ottoman citizens also failed.

Between 1904 and 1908, a group of Crimean Jews settled near the Arab village of al-Butayha in the Bethsaida Valley, initially as tenants of a Kurdish proprietor with the prospects of purchasing the land, but the arrangement faltered. Jewish settlement in the region dwindled over time, due to Arab hostility, Turkish bureaucracy, disease and economic difficulties. In 1921–1930, during the French Mandate, the Palestine Jewish Colonization Association (PICA) obtained the deeds to the Rothschild estate and continued to manage it, collecting rents from the Arab peasants living there.

=== French and British mandates ===
Boundary changes in the area of the Golan Heights in the 20th century

Great Britain accepted a Mandate for Palestine at the meeting of the Allied Supreme Council at San Remo, but the borders of the territory were not defined at that stage. The boundary between the forthcoming British and French mandates was defined in broad terms by the Franco-British Boundary Agreement of December 1920. That agreement placed the bulk of the Golan Heights in the French sphere. The treaty also established a joint commission to settle the precise details of the border and mark it on the ground.

The commission submitted its final report on 3 February 1922, and it was approved with some caveats by the British and French governments on 7 March 1923, several months before Britain and France assumed their Mandatory responsibilities on 29 September 1923. In accordance with the same process, a nearby parcel of land that included the ancient site of Tel Dan and the Dan spring were transferred from Syria to Palestine early in 1924.

The Golan Heights, including the spring at Wazzani and the one at Banias, became part of French Syria, while the Sea of Galilee was placed entirely within British Mandatory Palestine. When the French Mandate for Syria ended in 1944, the Golan Heights became part of the newly independent state of Syria and was later incorporated into Quneitra Governorate.

=== Border incidents after 1948 ===
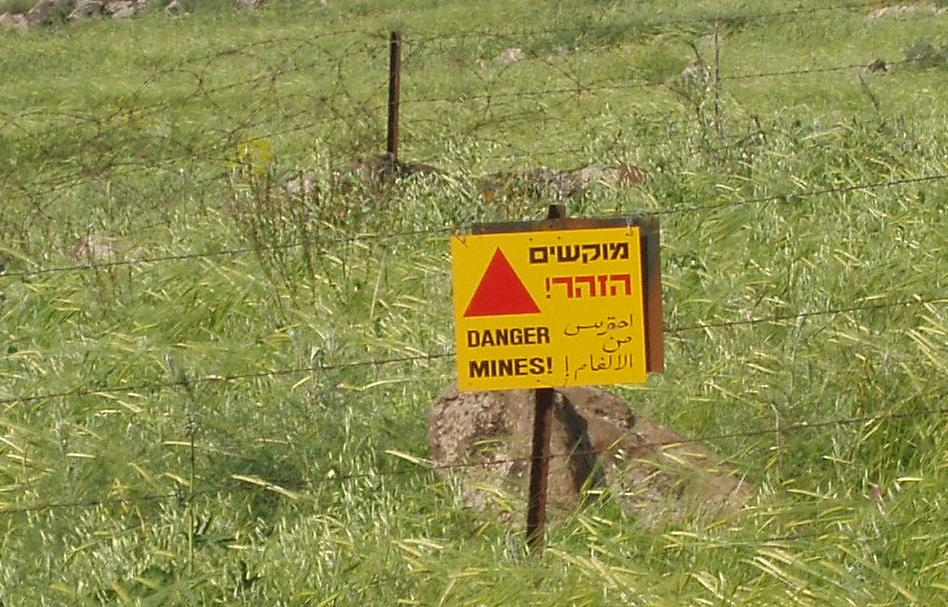
A minefield warning sign in the Golan

After the 1948–49 Arab–Israeli War, the Golan Heights was partly demilitarized by the Israel-Syria Armistice Agreement. During the following years, the area along the border witnessed thousands of violent incidents; the armistice agreement was being violated by both sides. The underlying causes of the conflict were a disagreement over the legal status of the demilitarized zone (DMZ), cultivation of land within it and competition over water resources. Syria claimed that neither party had sovereignty over the DMZ.

Israel contended that the Armistice Agreement dealt solely with military concerns and that it had political and legal rights over the DMZ. Israel wanted to assert control up to the boundary established in the 1923 Paulet–Newcombe Agreement in order to claim the Hula swamp, gain exclusive rights to Lake Galilee and divert water from the Jordan for its National Water Carrier. During the 1950s, Syria registered two principal territorial accomplishments: it took over Al Hammah enclosure south of Lake Tiberias and established a de facto presence on and control of the eastern shore of the lake.

Israel expelled Arabs from the DMZ and demolished their homes. Palestinian refugees were denied the right of return or compensation, and because of this they started raids on Israel. The Syrian government supported the Palestinian attacks because of Israel taking over more land in the DMZ.

The Jordan Valley Unified Water Plan was sponsored by the United States and agreed by the technical experts of the Arab League and Israel. The U.S. funded the Israeli and Jordanian water diversion projects, when they pledged to abide by the plan's allocations. President Nasser too, assured the U.S. that the Arabs would not exceed the plan's water quotas. However, in the early 1960s the Arab League funded a Syrian water diversion project that would have denied Israel use of a major portion of its water allocation. The resulting armed clashes are called the War over Water.

In 1955, Israel launched an attack that killed 56 Syrian soldiers. The attack was condemned by the United Nations Security Council.

In July 1966, Fatah began raids into Israeli territory, with active support from Syria. At first the militants entered via Lebanon or Jordan, but those countries made concerted attempts to stop them and raids directly from Syria increased. Israel's response was a series of retaliatory raids, of which the largest were an attack on the Jordanian village of Samu in November 1966. In April 1967, after Syria heavily shelled Israeli villages from the Golan Heights, Israel shot down six Syrian MiG fighter planes and warned Syria against future attacks.

The Israelis used to send tractors with armed police into the DMZ, which prompted Syria firing at Israel. In the period between the first Arab–Israeli War and the Six-Day War, the Syrians constantly harassed Israeli border communities by firing artillery shells from their dominant positions on the Golan Heights. In October 1966 Israel brought the matter up before the United Nations. Five nations sponsored a resolution criticizing Syria for its actions but it failed to pass. No Israeli civilian was killed in half a year leading up to the Six-Day War and the Syrian attacks have been called "largely symbolic".

Former Israeli General Mattityahu Peled said that more than half of the border clashes before the 1967 war "were a result of our security policy of maximum settlement in the demilitarized area". Israeli incursions into the zone were responded to with Syrians shooting. Israel in turn would retaliate with military force. According to Finkelstein, the narrative of Syrians attacking "innocent" Israel from the Golan Heights can be construed as "historical revisionism".

In 1976, former Israeli defense minister Moshe Dayan said Israel provoked more than 80% of the clashes with Syria in the run up to the 1967 war, although two Israeli historians debate whether he was "giving an accurate account of the situation in 1967 or whether his version of what happened was colored by his disgrace after the 1973 Middle East war, when he was forced to resign as Defense Minister over the failure to anticipate the Arab attack." The provocation was sending a tractor to plow in the demilitarized areas to get the Syrians to attack. The Syrians responded by firing at the tractors and shelling Israeli settlements. Jan Mühren, a former UN observer in the area at the time, told a Dutch current affairs programme that Israel "provoked most border incidents as part of its strategy to annex more land". UN officials blamed both Israel and Syria for destabilizing the borders.

=== Six-Day War and Israeli occupation ===
After the Six-Day War broke out in June 1967, Syria began shelling towns in Israel's north, which was disregarded for the first few days of the war, until the Israel Defense Forces captured the Golan Heights on 9–10 June. The area that came under Israeli control as a result of the war consists of two geologically distinct areas: the Golan Heights proper, with a surface of 1,070 km^{2} (410 sq mi), and the slopes of the Mount Hermon range, with a surface of 100 km^{2} (39 sq mi). The new ceasefire line was named the Purple Line. In the Golan Heights’ battle, 115 Israelis were killed and 306 wounded. An estimated 2,500 Syrians were killed, with another 5,000 wounded.

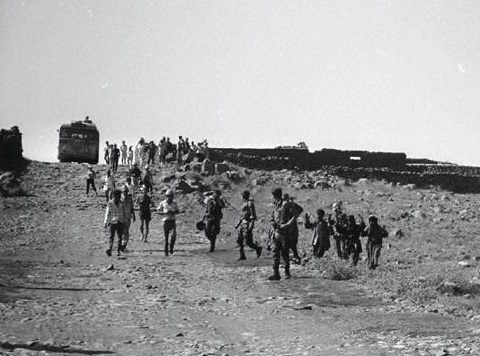
Syrian civilians with their hands raised being expelled from the Golan Heights by Israeli soldiers.

During the war, between 80,000 and 131,000 Syrians fled or were expelled from the Heights, and around 7,000 remained in the Israeli-occupied territory. Israeli sources and the U.S. Committee for Refugees and Immigrants reported that much of the local population of 100,000 fled as a result of the war, whereas the Syrian government stated that a large proportion of it was expelled. Among those forced out was the Fadl tribe. Israel has disallowed former residents to return, citing security reasons. The remaining villages were Majdal Shams, Shayta (later destroyed), Ein Qiniyye, Mas'ade, Buq'ata and, outside the Golan proper, Ghajar.

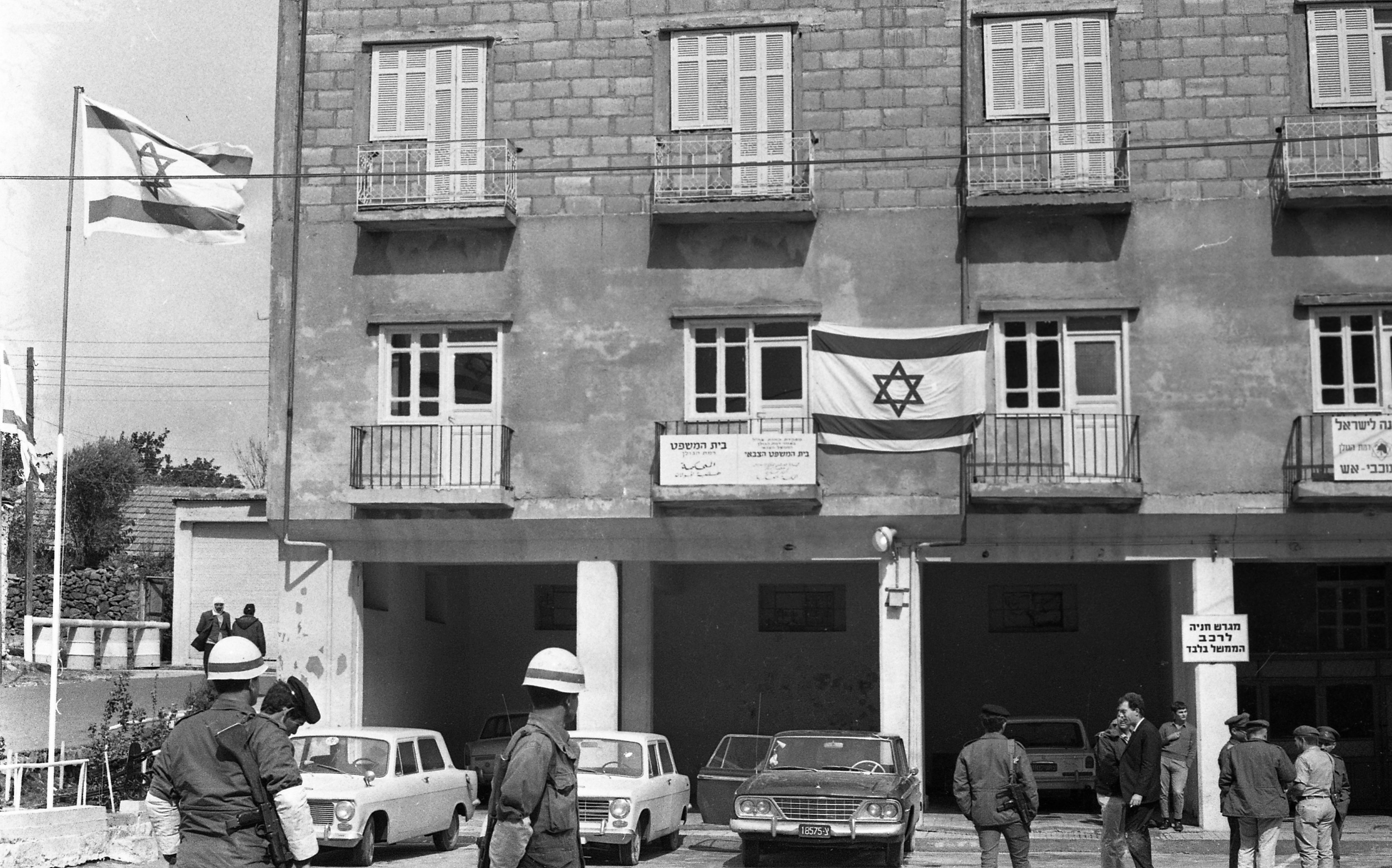
Military police headquarters in Quneitra under Israeli occupation, 1969.

Israeli settlement in the Golan began soon after the war. Merom Golan was founded in July 1967, and by 1970, there were 12 settlements. Construction of Israeli settlements began in the remainder of the territory held by Israel, which was under military administration until 1981, when Israel passed the Golan Heights Law extending Israeli law and administration throughout the territory. On 19 June 1967, the Israeli cabinet voted to return the Golan to Syria in exchange for a peace agreement, although this was rejected after the Khartoum Resolution of 1 September 1967. In the 1970s, as part of the Allon Plan, Israeli politician Yigal Allon proposed that a Druze state be established in Syria's Quneitra Governorate, including the Israeli-held Golan Heights. Allon died in 1980 and his plan never materialised.

==== Yom Kippur War ====
During the Yom Kippur War in 1973, Syrian forces overran much of the southern Golan, before being pushed back by an Israeli counterattack. Israel and Syria signed a ceasefire agreement in 1974 that left almost all the Heights in Israeli hands. The agreement delineated a demilitarized zone along the border and limited the number of forces each side can deploy within 25 kilometres (16 mi) of the zone. In the aftermath of the war and under the terms of United Nations Security Council Resolution 350, the United Nations Disengagement Observer Force was assigned responsibility to oversee the demilitarized zone.

East of the 1974 ceasefire line, lies the Syrian controlled part of the Heights, an area covering 500 square kilometres (190 sq mi) that was not captured by Israel or 100 square kilometres (39 sq mi) that they had not withdrawn from. This area forms 30% of the Golan Heights. Today, it contains more than 40 Syrian towns and villages. In 1975, following the 1974 ceasefire agreement, Israel returned a narrow demilitarized zone to Syrian control. Some of the displaced residents started to return to their homes there, supported by the Syrian government’s rebuilding efforts, except for Quneitra. In the mid-1980s, the Syrian government launched "The Project for the Reconstruction of the Liberated Villages". By the end of 2007, the population of the Quneitra Governorate was estimated at 79,000.

Mines deployed by the Syrian army remain active. As of 2003, there had been at least 216 landmine casualties in the Syrian-controlled Golan since 1973, of which 108 were fatalities.

==== Annexation by Israel ====
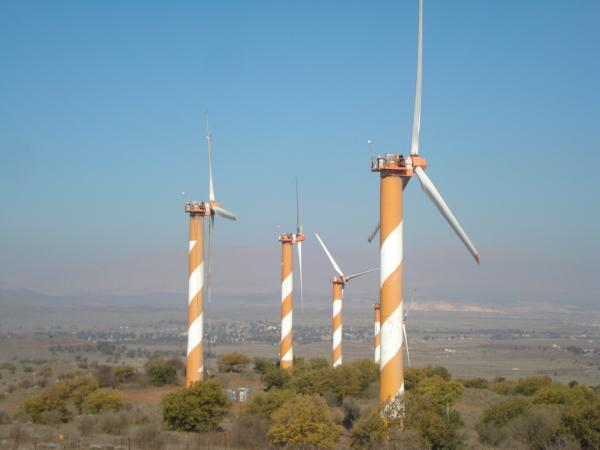
Golan Heights wind farm on Mount Bnei Rasan

On 14 December 1981, Israel passed the Golan Heights Law, extending Israeli "laws, jurisdiction and administration" to the Golan Heights. Although the law effectively annexed the territory to Israel, it did not explicitly spell out a formal annexation. The Golan Heights Law was declared "null and void and without international legal effect" by United Nations Security Council Resolution 497, which also demanded that Israel rescind its decision.

During the negotiations regarding the text of United Nations Security Council Resolution 242, U.S. Secretary of State Dean Rusk explained that U.S. support for secure permanent frontiers did not mean the United States supported territorial changes. The UN representative for the United Kingdom, responsible for negotiating and drafting the Security Council resolution, said that the actions of the Israeli Government in establishing settlements and colonizing the Golan are in clear defiance of Resolution 242.

Syria continued to demand a full Israeli withdrawal to the 1967 borders, including a strip of land on the east shore of the Sea of Galilee that Syria captured during the 1948–49 Arab–Israeli War and occupied from 1949 to 1967. Successive Israeli governments have considered an Israeli withdrawal from the Golan in return for normalization of relations with Syria, provided certain security concerns are met. Prior to 2000, Syrian president Hafez al-Assad rejected normalization with Israel.

Since the passing of the Golan Heights Law, Israel has treated the Israeli-occupied portion of the Golan Heights as a subdistrict of its Northern District. The largest locality in the region is the Druze village of Majdal Shams, which is at the foot of Mount Hermon, while Katzrin is the largest Israeli settlement. The region covers 1,176 square kilometres (454 sq mi). The subdistrict has a population density of 36 inhabitants per square kilometre (93/sq mi), and its population includes Arab, Jewish and Druze citizens. The district has 36 localities, of which 32 are Jewish settlements and four are Druze villages.

The plan for the creation of the settlements, which had initially begun in October 1967 with a request for a regional agricultural settlement plan for the Golan, was formally approved in 1971 and later revised in 1976. The plan called for the creation of 34 settlements by 1995, one of which would be an urban center, Katzrin, and the rest rural settlements, with a population of 54,000, among them 40,000 urban and the remaining rural. By 1992, 32 settlements had been created, among them one city and two regional centers. The population total had however fallen short of Israel's goals, with only 12,000 Jewish inhabitants in the Golan settlements in 1992.

===== Municipal elections in Druze towns =====
In 2016, a group of Druze lawyers petitioned the Supreme Court of Israel to allow elections for local councils in the Golan Druze towns of Majdal Shams, Buq'ata, Mas'ade, and Ein Qiniyye, replacing the previous system in which their members were appointed by the national government.

On 3 July 2017, the Interior Ministry announced those towns would be included in the 2018 Israeli municipal elections. The turnout was just over 1% with Druze religious leaders telling community members to boycott the elections or face shunning.

The United Nations Human Rights Council issued a Resolution on Human Rights in the Occupied Syrian Golan on 23 March 2018 that included the statement "Deploring the announcement by the Israeli occupying authorities in July 2017 that municipal elections would be held on 30 October 2018 in the four villages in the occupied Syrian Golan, which constitutes another violation to international humanitarian law and to relevant Security Council resolutions, in particular resolution 497 (1981)".

=== Israeli–Syrian peace negotiations ===
During the 1990s, successive Israeli governments engaged in negotiations with Syria over a possible peace agreement involving an Israeli withdrawal from the Golan Heights in exchange for peace, recognition, normalization of relations and security arrangements.

During Benjamin Netanyahu's first term as prime minister (1996–1999), American businessman and former diplomat Ronald Lauder served as an unofficial intermediary in secret negotiations with Syrian President Hafez al-Assad. In an October 2026 interview with Haaretz, Lauder said that Netanyahu had authorized him to conduct the negotiations and that he had spent approximately 10 to 15 months traveling between Israel, Syria and Lebanon, with the involvement of Lebanese Prime Minister Rafic Hariri. According to Lauder, the negotiations produced a ten-point framework for a peace agreement that included Israeli withdrawal from the Golan Heights. Lauder claimed that Assad was prepared to sign the agreement and that Netanyahu had accepted its terms, but subsequently refused to sign unless Defense Minister Ariel Sharon endorsed it. Netanyahu has denied having agreed to relinquish the Golan Heights. Lauder said that Netanyahu's refusal prevented the agreement from being concluded.

During United States-brokered negotiations in 1999–2000, under Israeli Prime Minister Ehud Barak, Israel and Syria discussed a peace agreement that would include Israeli withdrawal in return for comprehensive peace, recognition and full normalization of relations. A major disagreement in the final stages concerned access to the Sea of Galilee. Israel offered to withdraw to the pre-1948 international boundary (the 1923 Paulet–Newcombe line), while Syria insisted on the lines of June 4, 1967. Syria maintained that the earlier boundary had been imposed by colonial powers, while Israel rejected the 1967 lines, which reflected territorial changes following the 1948 Arab–Israeli War.

While the difference between the lines is less than 100 metres (330 ft) for the most part, the 1967 line would give Syria access to the Sea of Galilee, while Israel wished to retain control of the lake, an important freshwater resource. Dennis Ross, U.S. President Bill Clinton's chief Middle East negotiator, attributed the breakdown partly to Barak's reluctance to make the necessary concessions. Clinton also attributed responsibility to Israel in his autobiography, My Life. American diplomat Martin Indyk subsequently wrote that the negotiations had begun during Netanyahu's first term and that Netanyahu had been more willing to consider territorial concessions than his later public statements suggested.

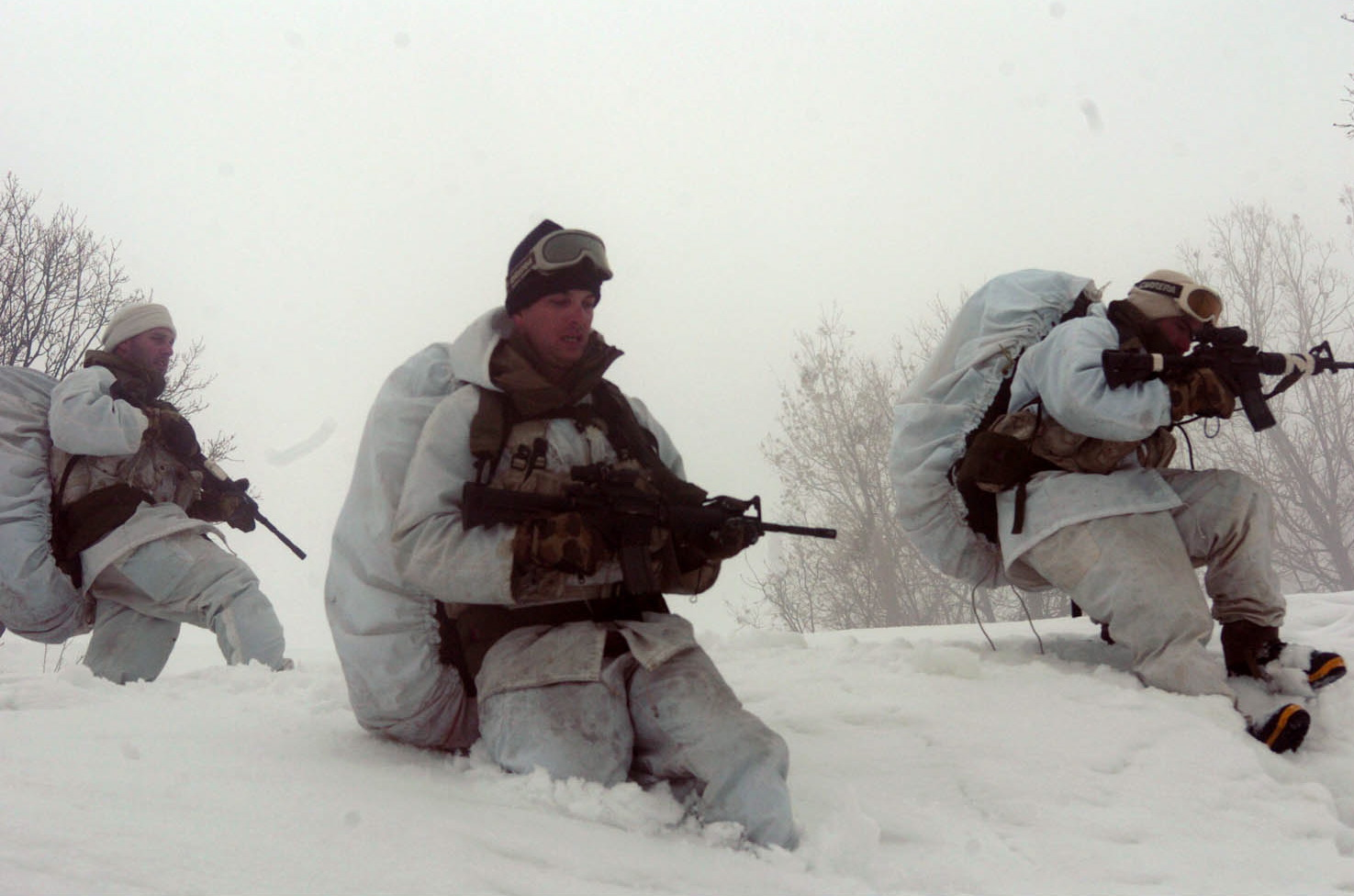
Israeli soldiers of the Alpinist Unit on Mount Hermon.

In June 2007, it was reported that Prime Minister Ehud Olmert had sent a secret message to Syrian President Bashar al-Assad indicating that Israel was prepared to withdraw from the Golan Heights in exchange for a comprehensive peace agreement and the severing of Syria's ties with Iran and militant groups in the region. On the same day, Netanyahu, then a former prime minister, claimed that Hafez al-Assad had been willing to allow Israel to retain Mount Hermon in a future agreement.

In April 2008, Syrian media reported that Turkish Prime Minister Recep Tayyip Erdoğan had told Bashar al-Assad that Israel was prepared to withdraw from the Golan Heights in exchange for peace. Israeli leaders of communities in the Golan Heights opposed any withdrawal, stating that construction and development projects would continue and warning that relinquishing Israeli control would damage national security. A May 2008 poll found that 70% of Israelis opposed relinquishing the Golan Heights in exchange for peace with Syria.

In 2008, the United Nations General Assembly adopted a resolution by a vote of 161–1 reaffirming United Nations Security Council Resolution 497 and calling on Israel to cease changing the physical character, demographic composition and legal status of the occupied Syrian Golan, including through settlement construction and the imposition of Israeli citizenship. Israel was the only country to vote against the resolution. Indirect Israeli–Syrian negotiations mediated by Turkey broke down following the outbreak of the Gaza War in December 2008. Syria suspended the talks in protest against Israeli military operations, although Israel subsequently sought to resume Turkish mediation.

In March 2009, Bashar al-Assad said that the indirect negotiations had failed because Israel had not committed to a complete withdrawal from the Golan Heights. In May, Netanyahu, who had returned to office as prime minister, rejected withdrawal, arguing that it would place Israel on Iran's front lines. Netanyahu had previously declared in 2007 that the Golan Heights would remain under Israeli control.

In June 2009, Israeli President Shimon Peres said that Syria would have to negotiate without preconditions and could not expect territorial concessions while maintaining ties with Iran and Hezbollah. Syrian Foreign Minister Walid Muallem responded that the Golan Heights belonged to Syria and demanded their unconditional return. Assad stated that there was "no real partner in Israel" for peace negotiations. In August 2009, Assad reiterated that the return of the entire Golan Heights was non-negotiable.

In February 2010, Israeli Foreign Minister Avigdor Lieberman rejected Syria's demand for the return of the Golan Heights, saying that Syria would have to relinquish its territorial claim.

=== Syrian civil war ===
2011 VOA report about how Golan Druze were affected by the Syrian civil war

From 2012 to 2018 in the Syrian civil war, the eastern Golan Heights became a scene of repeated battles between the Syrian Army, rebel factions of the Syrian opposition including the moderate Southern Front, the jihadist al-Nusra Front, and factions affiliated with the Islamic State of Iraq and the Levant (ISIL) terrorist group.

The atrocities of the Syrian civil war and the rise of ISIL, which from 2016 to 2018 controlled parts of the Syrian-administered Golan, added a new twist to the issue. In 2015, it was reported that Israeli Prime Minister Benjamin Netanyahu asked US President Barack Obama to recognize Israeli claims to the territory because of these recent ISIL actions and because he said that modern Syria had likely "disintegrated" beyond the point of reunification. The White House dismissed Netanyahu's suggestion, stating that President Obama continued to support UN resolutions 242 and 497, and any alterations of this policy could strain American alliances with Western-backed Syrian rebel groups.

In 2016, the Islamic State apologized to Israel after a firefight with Israeli soldiers in the area.

After the April 2018 missile strikes against Syria by the United States, France, and the United Kingdom, a group of about 500 Druze in the Golan Heights town of Ein Qiniyye marched in support of Syrian president Bashar al-Assad on Syria's Independence Day and in condemnation of the American-led strikes.

In May 2018, after 20 Iranian rockets were launched at Israeli army positions in the western Golan Heights, the first direct attack by Iran against Israeli forces, the Israel Defense Forces (IDF) launched Operation House of Cards, a series of "extensive" air strikes against Iranian military installations in Syria.

After waging a month-long 2018 Southern Syria offensive against the rebels and ISIL, the Syrian government regained control of the eastern Golan Heights on 31 July 2018.

=== Gaza war spillover ===
The day after the October 7 attacks, Hezbollah fired mortars at Northern Israel from Lebanese territory, and Israel responded with artillery fire. Hostilities are still ongoing. In the first year following the attacks, Hezbollah fired 8,000 rockets into Israel, resulting in the displacement of 70,000 Israelis. During the same period, Israeli reprisals resulted in the displacement of 1.4 million Lebanese people.

In June 2024, after a wave of Israeli strikes on Hezbollah targets in Lebanon, Hezbollah launched a series of rocket and drone attacks in the Golan Heights, causing the destruction of 10,000 dunams (10 km^{2}; 3.9 sq mi) of open areas by fire and damaging parts of the Yehudiya Forest Nature Reserve, including hiking trails and the reserve's Black Canyon. An official from the Israel Nature and Parks Authority said it would take years for the local flora to recover.

A rocket fired from Lebanese territory struck a soccer field in the Druze town of Majdal Shams in the Golan Heights on July 27, 2024. The strike resulted in the deaths of 12 Druze children. The IDF stated the rocket was fired by Hezbollah, a claim which Hezbollah denied. US intelligence could not determine if the attack was intentional or a misfire, but they maintained that Hezbollah was responsible. Meanwhile, Hezbollah, along with Iranian and Qatari state media, posited that an Israeli Iron Dome interceptor was to blame.

=== 2024 Israeli invasion of Syria ===
Following the 2024 Syrian opposition offensives and the fall of the Assad regime, Prime Minister Netanyahu ordered Israeli forces to seize the buffer zone on 8 December 2024, citing the abandonment of Syrian positions and the collapse of the 1974 ceasefire agreement. Israeli forces also launched strikes on Syrian military assets, including air strikes destroying the Syrian Navy and, it was claimed, 90% of Syria's known surface-to-air missiles.

Israel started violating the 1974 Disengagement Agreement before Assad's fall in November with engineering work and battle tanks inside the demilitarized zone. UNDOF had: "repeatedly engaged with the IDF to protest the construction" In December, Israeli forces occupied Mount Hermon advancing as far as the town of Beqaasem, situated about 25 kilometres (16 mi) from Damascus. Holding Mount Hermon - at 2,800 metres (9,200 ft) the highest point in Syria - would facilitate Israeli electronic surveillance deep in Syrian territory and provide additional warning with respect to military developments in the region.

A report from June 2025, showed that since the Israeli invasion of Syria in 2024, the Israelis have deforested large portions of the Quneitra governorate. Hundreds of acres of trees have been cut down by Israel including the Jabaatha Nature Reserve and Kudna forest have been destroyed. The deforestation threatens wildlife and biodiversity in the region. Syrian farmers have also been prohibited from entering their farmlands.

In January 2026, the Israeli military destroyed two historic buildings in the Golan, the al-Golan hospital and al-Andalus Cinema, both in Quneitra.

In January 2026, several reports documented Israeli planes spraying chemicals on Syrian farmland and forests in the Golan Heights. Israel spraying chemicals were also reported in southern Lebanon. A sample from Lebanon showed that the chemical contained a carcinogenic classified herbicide, but in dozens of times higher concentration than normal usage.

In July 2026, the United Nations Secretary-General António Guterres visited Syria and stated: "Violations of Syria's sovereignty and territorial integrity are unacceptable and must cease. What is happening in the region around the Golan Heights is totally unacceptable," and: "I'd like to remind the international community that the Golan Heights are Syrian territory."

== Geography ==
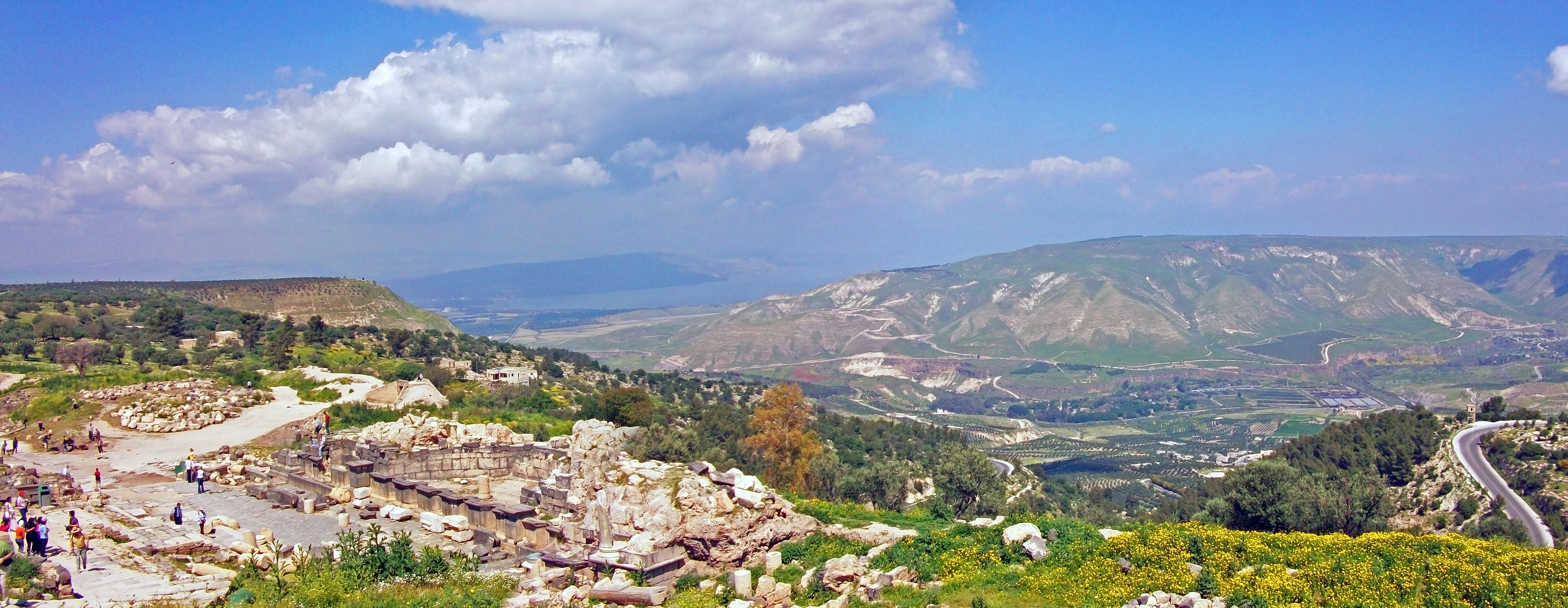
Sea of Galilee and southern Golan Heights, viewed from Umm Qais and the ruins of Gadara in Jordan

=== Geology ===
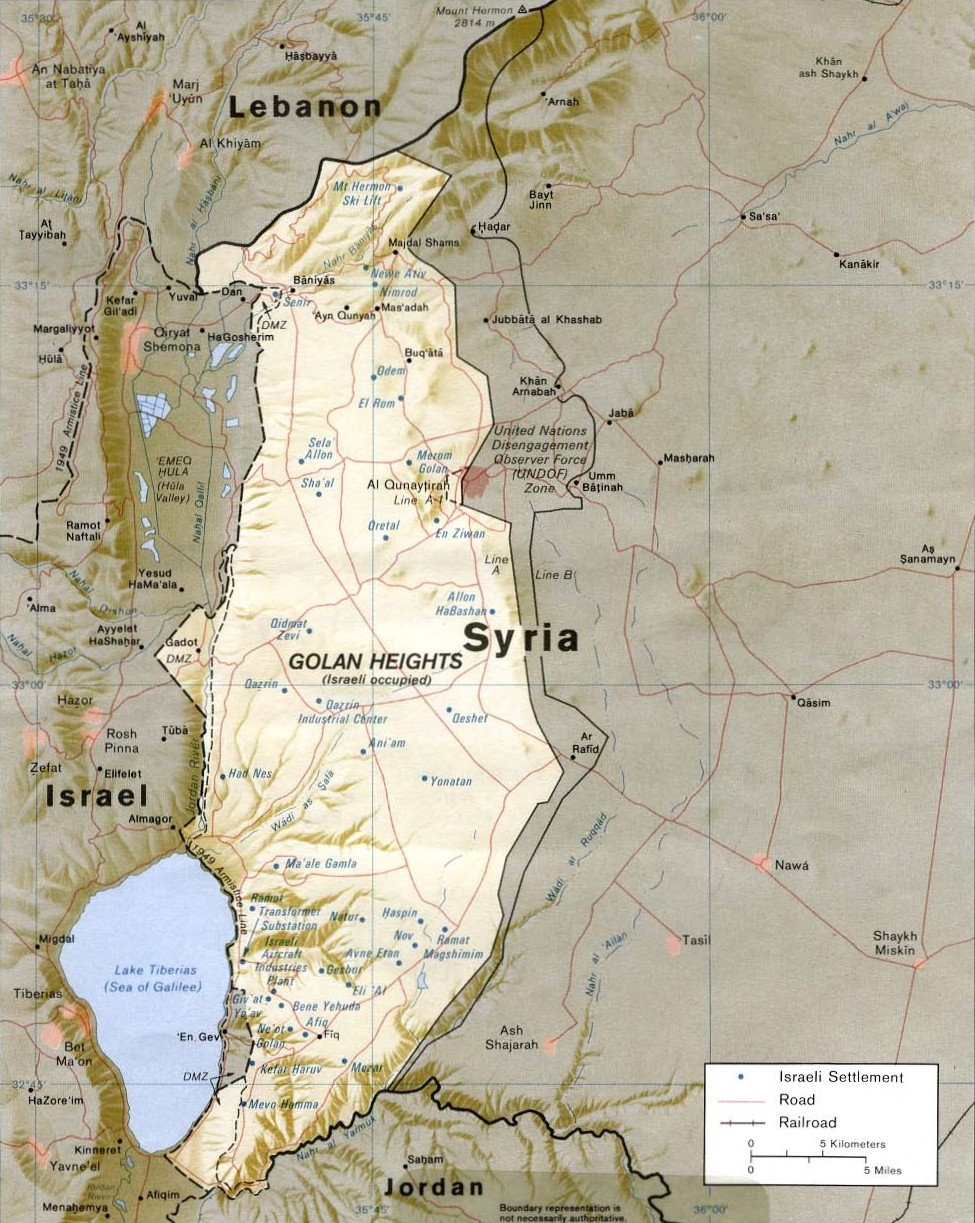
1994 CIA map of Golan Heights and vicinity

The plateau that Israel controls is part of a larger geological unit of volcanic basalt fields stretching north and east into north Jordan and southern Syria, past the Syrian desert, that were formed by a series of volcanic eruptions that began about 4 million years ago. The rock forming the mountainous area in the northern Golan Heights, descending from Mount Hermon, differs geologically from the volcanic rocks of the plateau and has a different physiography. The mountains are characterised by lighter-colored, Jurassic-age limestone of sedimentary origin. Locally, the limestone is broken by faults and solution channels to form a karst-like topography in which springs are common. , Geologically, the Golan plateau and the Hauran plain to the east constitute a Holocene volcanic field that also extends northeast almost to Damascus. Much of the area is scattered with dormant volcanos, as well as cinder cones, such as Majdal Shams. The plateau also contains a crater lake, called Birkat Ram ("Ram Pool"), which is fed by both surface runoff and underground springs. These volcanic areas are characterised by basalt bedrock and dark soils derived from its weathering. The basalt flows overlie older, distinctly lighter-colored limestones and marls, exposed along the Yarmouk River in the south.

=== Boundaries ===
The geographic definition of the Golan varies but is generally defined as the area bound by the Jordan Valley to the west, which separates it from the Galilee in Israel, the Yarmouk River to the south, which separates it from the Jabal Ajlun region in Jordan, and the Sa'ar stream (a tributary of Nahal Hermon/Nahr Baniyas) to the north which separates it from Mount Hermon and the Hula Valley close to the border with Lebanon. The natural eastern boundary of the region is alternatively placed at the Ruqqad river or the Allan river further east, which separates the Golan from the Hauran plain of Syria.

=== Size ===
The plateau's north–south length is approximately 65 km (40 mi) and its east–west width varies from 12 to 25 km (7.5 to 15.5 mi).

Israel has captured, according to its own data, 1,150 km^{2} (440 mi^{2}). According to Syria, the Golan Heights measures 1,860 km^{2} (718 mi^{2}), of which 1,500 km^{2} (580 mi^{2}) are occupied by Israel. According to the CIA, Israel holds 1,300 km^{2} (500 mi^{2}).

=== Topography ===
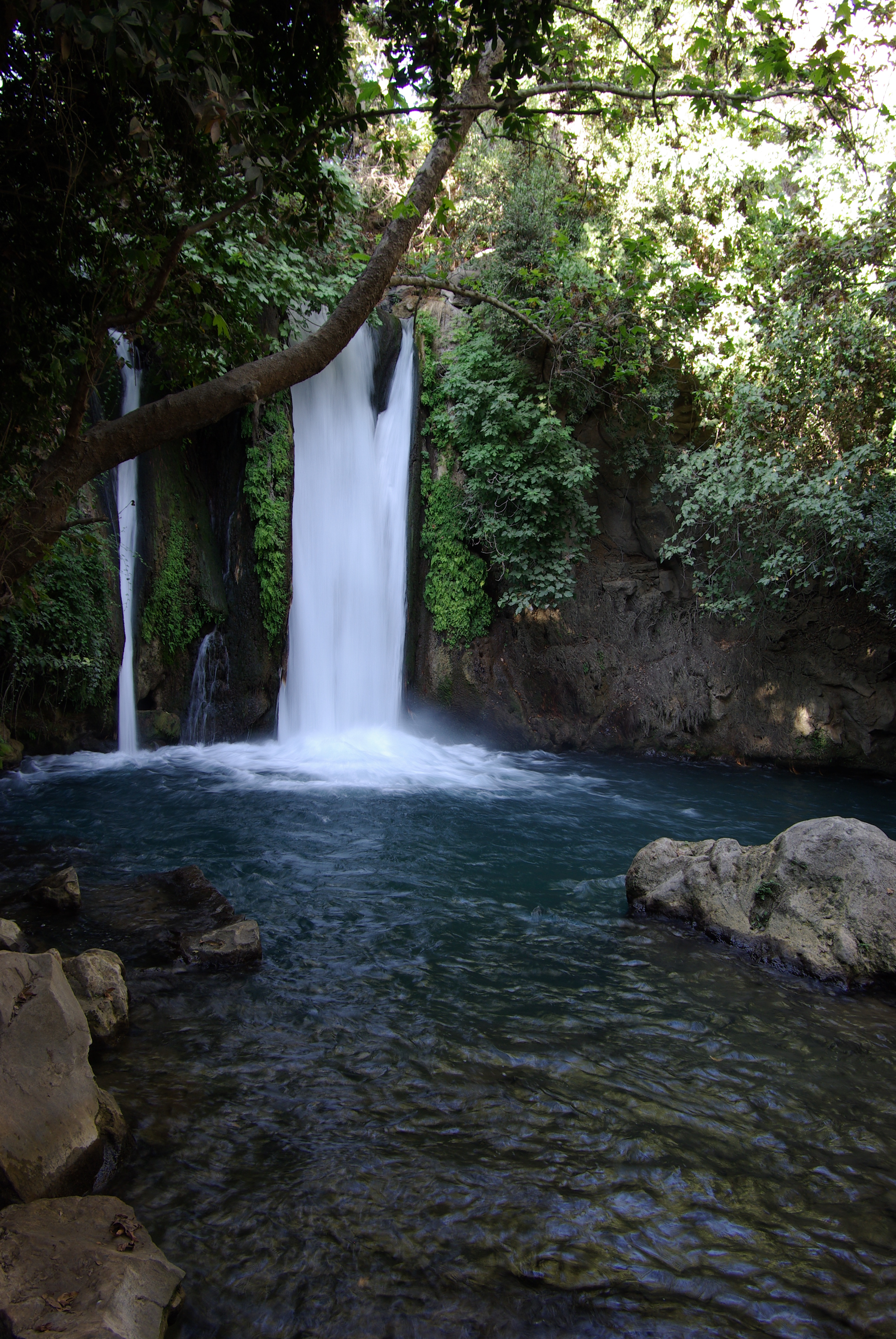
Banyas waterfall at the foot of Mount Hermon

The area is hilly and elevated, overlooking the Jordan Rift Valley which contains the Sea of Galilee and the Jordan River, and is itself dominated by the 2,814 m (9,232 ft) tall Mount Hermon. The Sea of Galilee at the southwest corner of the plateau and the Yarmouk River to the south are at elevations well below sea level (the sea of Galilee at about 200 m (660 ft)).

Topographically, the Golan Heights is a plateau with an average altitude of 1,000 metres (3,300 ft), rising northwards toward Mount Hermon and sloping down to about 400 m (1,300 ft) elevation along the Yarmouk River in the south. The steeper, more rugged topography is generally limited to the northern half, including the foothills of Mount Hermon; on the south the plateau is more level.

There are several small peaks on the Golan Heights, most of them volcanic cones, such as Mount Agas (1,350 m, 4,430 ft), Mount Dov/Jebel Rous (1,529 m, 5,016 ft; northern peak 1,524 m, 5,000 ft), Mount Bental (1,171 m, 3,842 ft) and opposite it Mount Avital (1,204 m, 3,950 ft), Mount Ram (1,188 m, 3,898 ft), and Tal Saki (594 metres, 1,949 ft).

==== Subdivisions ====
The broader Golan plateau exhibits a more subdued topography, generally ranging between 120 and 520 m (390 and 1,710 ft) in elevation. In Israel, the Golan plateau is divided into three regions: northern (between the Sa'ar and Jilabun valleys), central (between the Jilabun and Daliyot valleys), and southern (between the Daliyot and Yarmouk valleys). The Golan Heights is bordered on the west by a rock escarpment that drops 500 m (1,600 ft) to the Jordan River valley and the Sea of Galilee. In the south, the incised Yarmouk River valley marks the limits of the plateau and, east of the abandoned railroad bridge upstream of Hamat Gader and Al Hammah, it marks the recognised international border between Syria and Jordan.

=== Climate and hydrology ===
In addition to its strategic military importance, the Golan Heights is an important water resource, especially at the higher elevations, which are snow-covered in the winter and help sustain baseflow for rivers and springs during the dry season. The Heights receive significantly more precipitation than the surrounding, lower-elevation areas. The occupied sector of the Golan Heights provides or controls a substantial portion of the water in the Jordan River watershed, which in turn provides a portion of Israel's water supply. The Golan Heights supplies 15% of Israel's water.

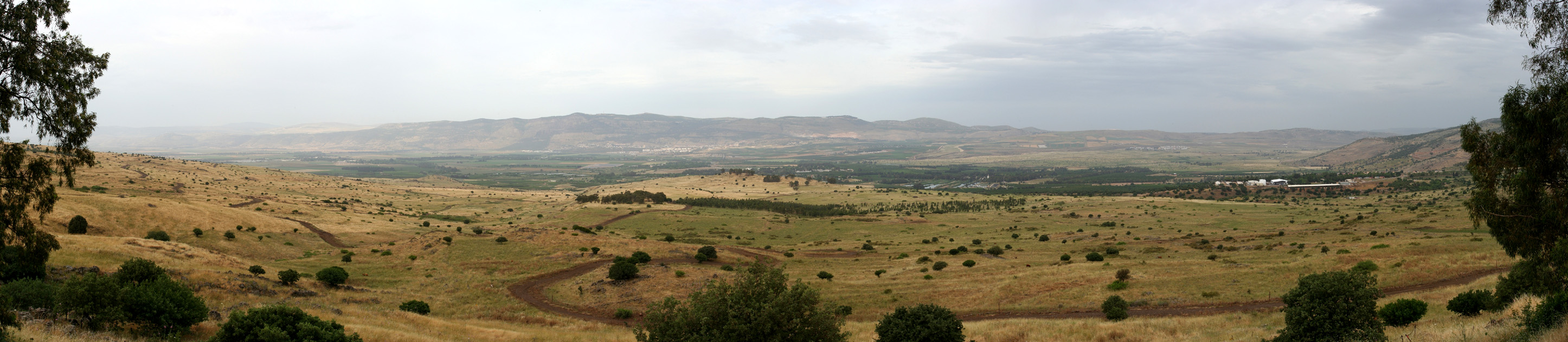
Panorama looking west from the former Syrian post of Tel Faher
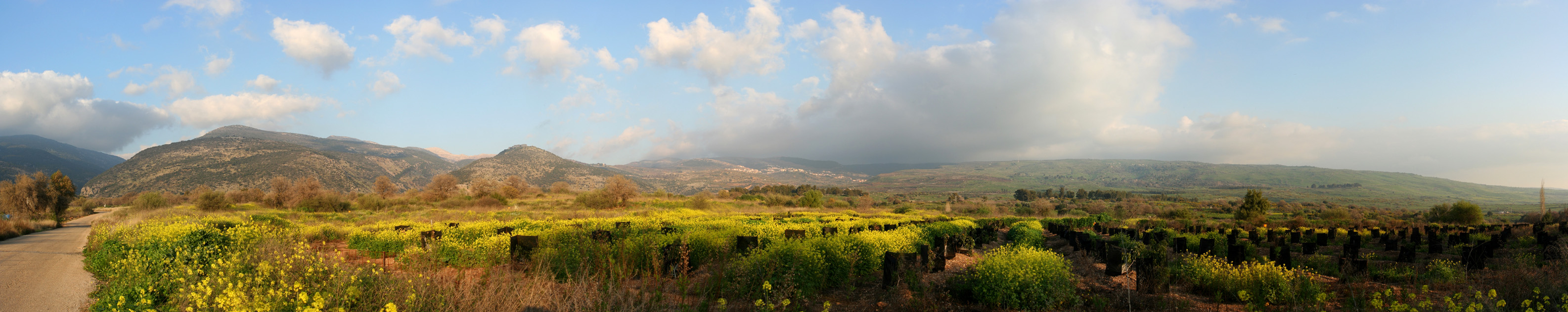
Panoramic view of the Golan Heights, with the Hermon mountains on the left side, taken from Snir
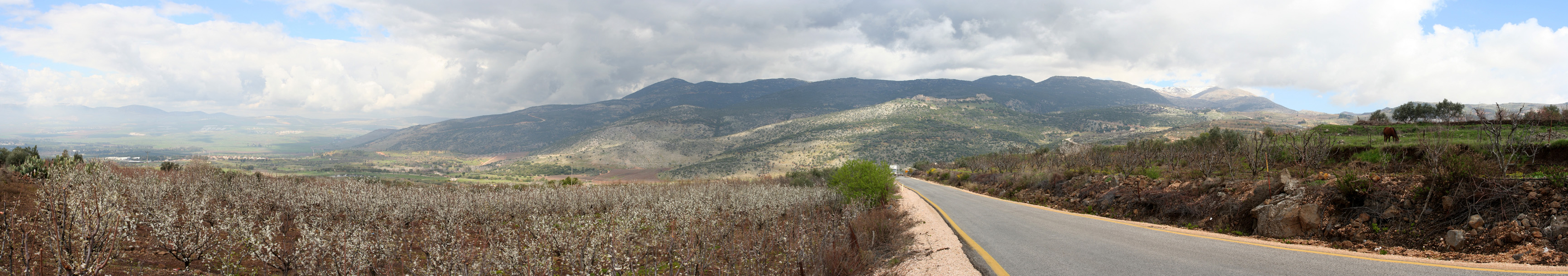
Panorama showing the upper Golan Heights and Mount Hermon, with the Hula Valley to the left

== Territorial claims ==
Claims on the territory include the Franco-British boundary agreement of 1920, which placed portions of the northwestern Golan region, delineated by a rough triangle formed by the towns of Banias, Quneitra and the northern tip of the Sea of Galilee, within the British Palestine Mandate in which the establishment of a Jewish national home had been promised. As part of the 1923 Paulet–Newcombe Agreement, this triangle in northwestern Golan was ceded to the French Mandate of Lebanon and Syria in exchange for land areas that had previously been part of the French Mandate, including the whole of the Sea of Galilee, which previously had its eastern boundary connected to the French Mandate and was placed under British control inside the Palestine Mandate.

Syria argues that the region was placed in the Vilayet of Damascus as part of Syria under the Ottoman boundaries and that the 1920 agreement was only temporary. Syria further claims that the final border line drawn in 1923, which excluded the Golan triangle, had superseded the 1920 agreement, although Syria has never recognised the 1923 border as legally binding.

Israel considers the Golan Heights vital for its national security, asserting that control over the region is necessary to defend against threats from Syria and Iranian proxy groups. It maintains that it may retain the area, as the text of Resolution 242 calls for "safe and recognised boundaries free from threats or acts of force".

=== Borders, armistice line and ceasefire line ===
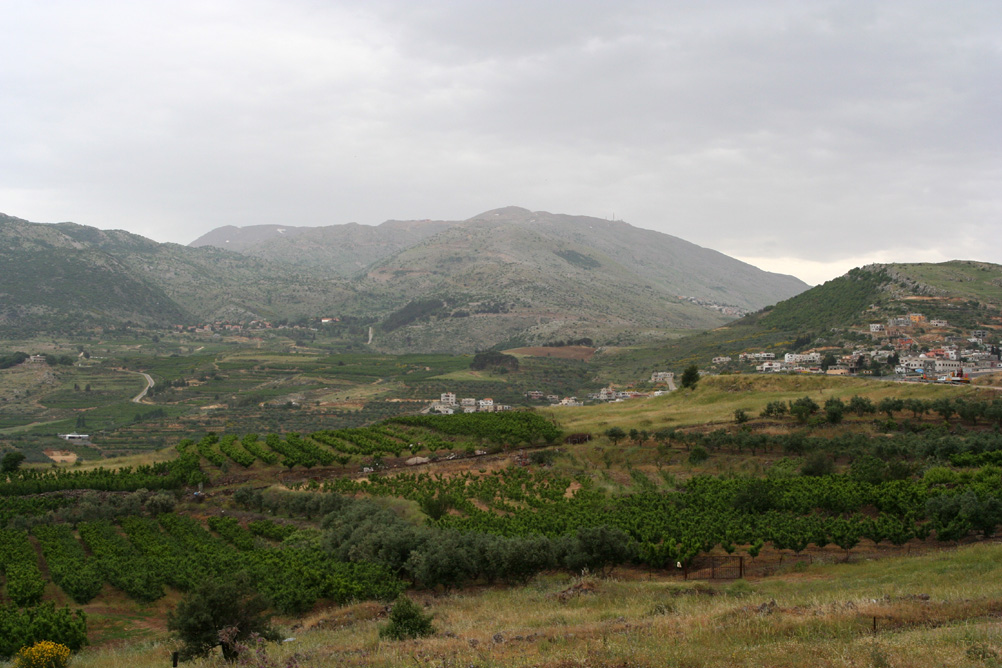
View of Mount Hermon from the road to Masaade

One of the aspects of the dispute involves the existence prior to 1967 of three different lines separating Syria from the area that before 1948 was referred to as Mandatory Palestine.

The 1923 boundary between British Mandatory Palestine and the French Mandate of Syria was drawn with an objective of providing the water supply needed for the British Mandate. Accordingly, it was demarcated so that all of the Sea of Galilee, including a 10-metre (33 ft) wide strip of beach along its northeastern shore, would stay inside Mandatory Palestine. From the Sea of Galilee north to Lake Hula the boundary was drawn between 50 and 400 metres (160 and 1,310 ft) east of the upper Jordan River, keeping that stream entirely within Mandatory Palestine. The British also received a sliver of land along the Yarmouk River, out to the present-day Hamat Gader.

During the Arab–Israeli War, Syria captured various areas of the formerly British controlled Mandatory Palestine, including the 10-metre (33 ft) strip of beach, the east bank of the upper Jordan, as well as areas along the Yarmouk.

While negotiating the 1949 Armistice Agreements, Israel called for the removal of all Syrian forces from the territory of the former Palestine Mandate. Syria refused, insisting on an armistice line based not on the 1923 international border but on the military status quo. The result was a compromise. Under the terms of an armistice signed on 20 July 1949, Syrian forces were to withdraw east of the 1923 Anglo-French Palestine-Syria boundary. Israeli forces were to refrain from entering the evacuated areas, which would become a demilitarized zone, "from which the armed forces of both Parties shall be totally excluded, and in which no activities by military or paramilitary forces shall be permitted."

Accordingly, major parts of the armistice lines departed from the 1923 boundary. There were three distinct, non-contiguous enclaves—to the west of Banias, on the west bank of the Jordan River near Lake Hula, and the eastern-southeastern shores of the Sea of Galilee extending out to Hamat Gader, consisting of 66.5 km^{2} (25.7 mi^{2}) of land lying between the 1949 armistice line and the 1923 boundary, forming the demilitarized zone.

Following the armistice, both Israel and Syria sought to take advantage of the territorial ambiguities left in place by the 1949 agreement. This resulted in an evolving tactical situation, one "snapshot" of which was the disposition of forces immediately prior to the Six-Day War, the "line of June 4, 1967".

=== Shebaa Farms ===
A small portion of territory in the Golan Heights, on the Lebanon–Syria border, has been a particular flashpoint. The territory, known as the Shebaa Farms, measures only 22 km^{2} (8.5 sq mi). Since 2000, Lebanon has officially claimed it to be Lebanese territory from which Israel should withdraw, and Syria has concurred.

The approximate boundary between Lebanon and Syria has its origins in an 1862 French map. During the early period of the French Mandate, both French and British maps were inconsistent regarding the boundary in the western Golan region, with some showing the Shebaa Farms in Lebanon and others, the majority, showing them in Syria. However, by 1936 the disagreement was eliminated by high quality maps showing the Shebaa Farms in Syria, and these formed the basis of later official maps. According to Kaufman, the choice between the two options was due to a preference for drawing boundaries along watersheds rather than along valleys. However, no detailed delineation or demarcation was performed throughout the mandate period.

Meanwhile, problems were reported with the location of the boundary. Several official documents from the 1930s state that the boundary lies along the Wadi al-'Asal (to the south of the Shebaa Farms). Local officials of the French administration reported that the de facto boundary did not correspond to the boundary shown on maps. The High Commissioner requested a Syrian–Lebanese negotiation but apparently nothing happened.

From the founding of the Syrian Republic in 1946 until the Israeli occupation in 1967, the Shebaa Farms were controlled by Syria and Lebanon did not make any known official complaint. The Israel occupation cut off the access of many Lebanese residents from the farms they had worked. In the context of renewal of the UNIFIL mandate, the Lebanese government implicitly endorsed United Nations maps of the region in 1978 and many times later, even though the maps showed the Shebaa Farms in Syria.

Lebanese newspapers, residents and politicians lobbied the Lebanese government in the early 1980s to take up the issue, but it was apparently not raised in the failed negotiations for an Israeli withdrawal after the 1982 Israeli invasion. A series of publications appeared, partly assisted by Hezbollah and Amal, and a committee which formed in the Lebanese town of Shebaa wrote to the UN in 1986 protesting Israeli occupation of their lands. However, it was Hezbollah in 2000 which first adopted the Shebaa Farms as the basis for a public territorial claim against Israel.

On 7 June 2000, the United Nations published the Blue Line as the line to which Israel should withdraw from Lebanon in accordance with Security Council Resolution 425. The UN chose to follow the maps at its disposal and did not accept the Lebanese complaint from several weeks earlier that the Shebaa Farms were in Lebanon. After the Israeli withdrawal, the United Nations affirmed on 18 June 2000 that Israel had withdrawn its forces from Lebanon. However, the press release noted that both Lebanon and Syria disagreed, considering the Shebaa Farms area to be Lebanese. In deference to the Lebanese position, the Blue Line is not marked on the ground in this location.

The attitude of the UN shifted during the following years. In 2006, the Lebanese government presented the UN with a seven-point plan that included a proposal to place the Shebaa Farms under UN administration until boundary demarcation and sovereignty were settled. In August of that year, the Security Council passed Resolution 1701 which "took due note" of the Lebanese plan and called for "delineation of the international borders of Lebanon, especially in those areas where the border is disputed or uncertain, including by dealing with the Shebaa farms area".

In 2007, a UN cartographer delineated the boundaries of the region: "starting from the turning point of the 1920 French line located just south of the village of El Majidiye; from there continuing south-east along the 1946 Moughr Shab'a-Shab'a boundary until reaching the thalweg of the Wadi al-Aasal; thence following the thalweg of the wadi north-east until reaching the crest of the mountain north of the former hamlet Mazraat Barakhta and reconnecting with the 1920 line." As of 2023, neither Syria nor Israel have responded to the delineation, nor have Lebanon and Syria made progress towards border demarcation.

The position of Israel, which occupied the Golan Heights in 1967 and annexed them in 1981, is that the Shebaa Farms belonged to Syria and there is no case for Lebanese sovereignty.

=== Ghajar ===
The Alawite village of Ghajar is located west of Shebaa farms. Before the 1967 war, the village was located at the junction of Syria, Lebanon and Israel. During the war, Israel did not initially capture the village, since they considered it Lebanese, but Lebanon told a delegation from Ghajar that they would shoot or jail Ghajar residents who crossed the Hasbani River. Ghajar residents then requested to become part of Israel and accepted Israeli citizenship after the area was annexed in 1981. Residents of Ghajar have been integrated in Israeli society and speak fluent Hebrew. The village had been divided by an international boundary, though there was no physical border running through it. Instead, the village is surrounded by a fence. The northern part of the village had been on the Lebanese side after the Israeli withdrawal in 2000 following the end of the South Lebanon conflict. Since July 2006, both halves of the village of 2,450 have been under Israeli control, with a majority of residents opposing a return to Lebanese control. There is an Israeli army checkpoint at the entrance to the village from the rest of the Golan Heights. Most residents hold dual Israeli citizenship and Syrian citizenship, and in the northern part many hold a Lebanese passport.

=== International views ===
The international community largely considers the Golan to be Syrian territory held under Israeli occupation.

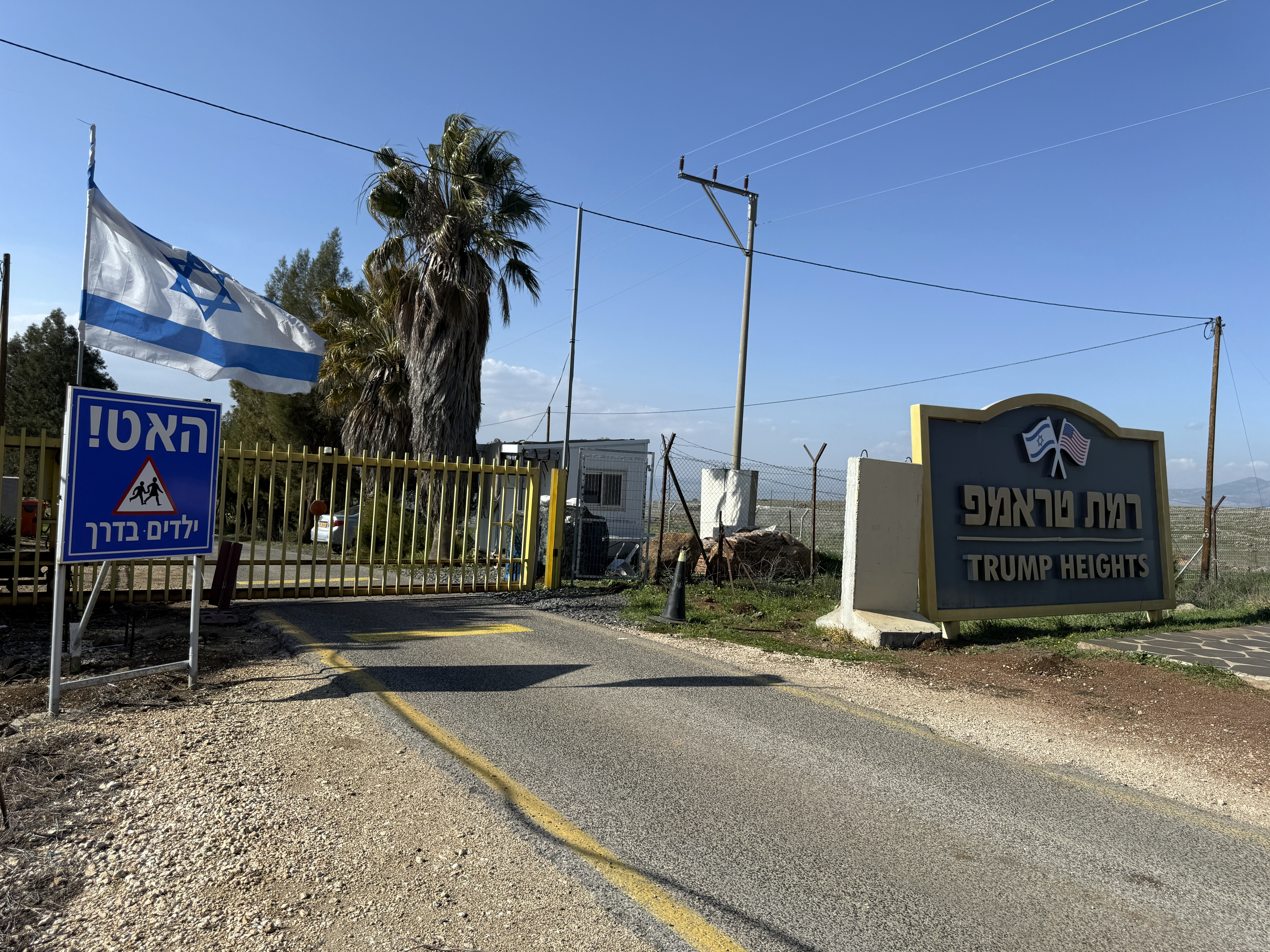
The entrance to the Israeli settlement of Trump Heights, founded in 2019, and named after Israeli settlers in tribute to US President Donald Trump

On 25 March 2019, then-President of the United States Donald Trump proclaimed U.S. recognition of the Golan Heights as part of Israel, making it the first country to do so. Israeli officials lobbied the United States into recognizing "Israeli sovereignty" over the territory. The 28 member states of the European Union declared in turn that they do not recognize Israeli sovereignty, and several experts on international law reiterated that the principle remains that land gained by either defensive or offensive wars cannot be legally annexed under international law. The European members of the UN Security Council issued a joint statement condemning the U.S. announcement and the UN Secretary-General issued a statement saying that the status of the Golan had not changed.

Under the subsequent administration of President Joe Biden, the U.S. State Department's annual report on human rights violations around the world again referred to the West Bank, Gaza Strip, East Jerusalem and the Golan Heights as being territories occupied by Israel. However, in June 2021, the Biden administration affirmed that it would maintain the previous administration's policy of recognizing Israeli sovereignty over the Golan Heights.

On 10 August 2026, Colombia became the second country to recognize Israeli sovereignty over the Golan Heights, after a meeting between the Israeli foreign minister and Colombia's new government. The Israeli foreign minister also stated that he will continue to work for other countries to recognize "Israeli sovereignty" over the territory. Colombia's recognition was condemned by Syria, Saudi Arabia, Egypt, Jordan, Qatar, Kuwait and Iraq. The Secretary-General of the Gulf Cooperation Council issued a statement condemning Colombia's recognition and stated that it violates international law. The United Nations Deputy Special Envoy for Syria Claudio Cordone stated that: "As most recently reaffirmed by Secretary-General António Guterres in Damascus, the Golan Heights are occupied Syrian territory. Colombia's acceptance of Israel's annexation of this territory directly contravenes international law."

== UNDOF supervision ==
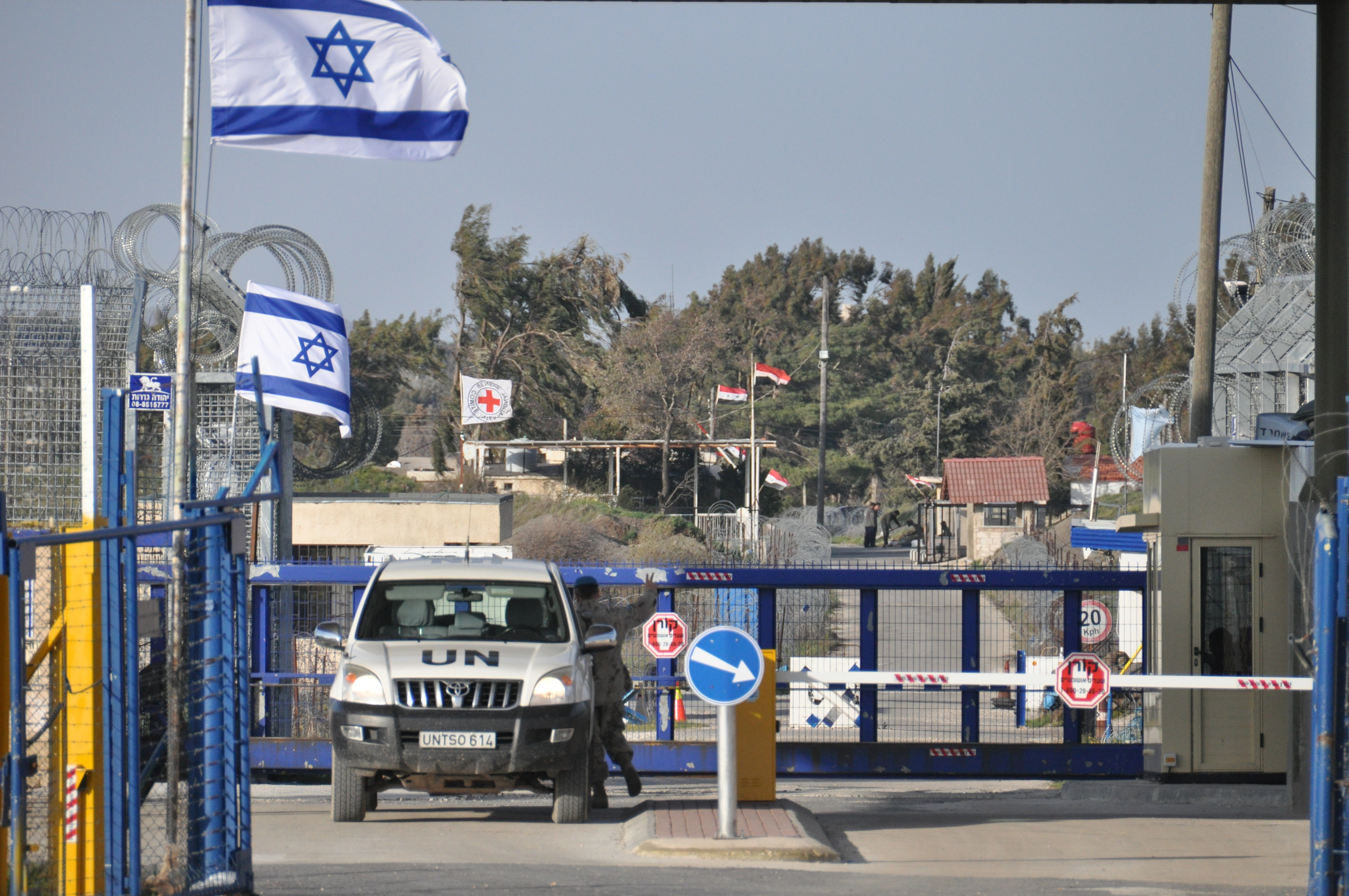
Golan ceasefire line crossing, 2012

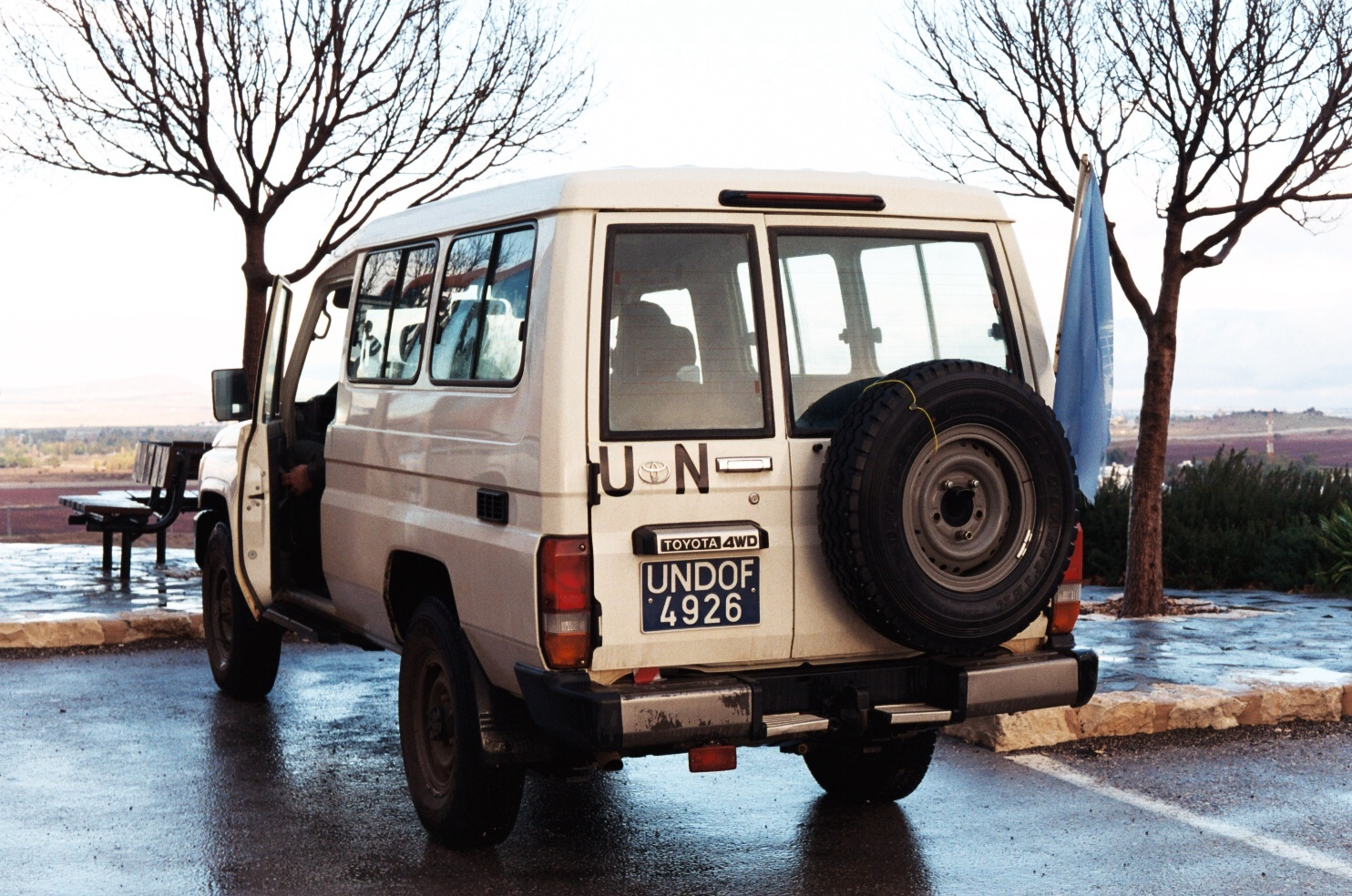
A UN Toyota Land Cruiser parked near Majdal Shams displaying UNDOF plates and a UN flag, January 2012

The United Nations Disengagement Observer Force (UNDOF) was established in 1974 to supervise the implementation of the Agreement on Disengagement and maintain the ceasefire with an area of separation known as the UNDOF Zone. Currently there are more than 1,000 UN peacekeepers there trying to sustain a peace. Syria and Israel still contest the ownership of the Heights but have not used overt military force since 1974.

The great strategic value of the Heights, both militarily and as a source of water, means that a deal is uncertain. Members of the UN Disengagement force are usually the only individuals who cross the Israeli–Syrian de facto border (cease fire "Alpha Line"). Since 1967, Druze brides have been allowed to cross into Syria, although they do so in the knowledge that they may not be able to return. Since 1988, Israel has allowed several hundred Druze pilgrims each year to cross into Syria to visit the shrine of Abel on Mount Qasioun overlooking Damascus, in visits coordinated through the International Committee of the Red Cross.

Though the cease fire in the UNDOF zone has been largely uninterrupted since the seventies, in 2012 there were repeated violations from the Syrian side, including tanks and live gunfire, though these incidents are attributed to the ongoing Syrian Civil War rather than intentionally directed towards Israel. On 15 October 2018, the Quneitra border crossing between the Golan Heights and Syria reopened for UNDOF personnel after four years of closure.

== Syrian villages ==
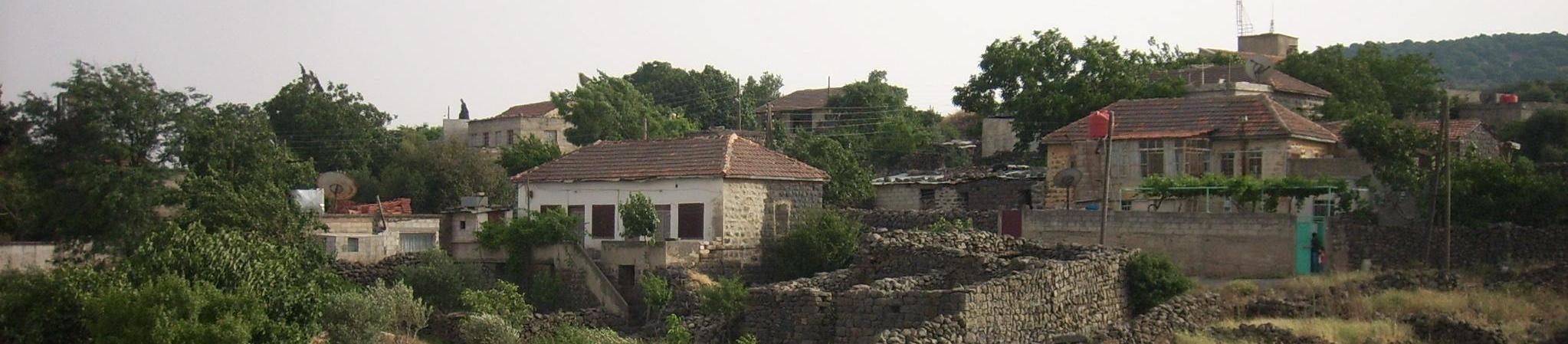
Beer Ajam (بئرعجم), a Syrian Circassian village in the province of Quneitra, founded in 1872

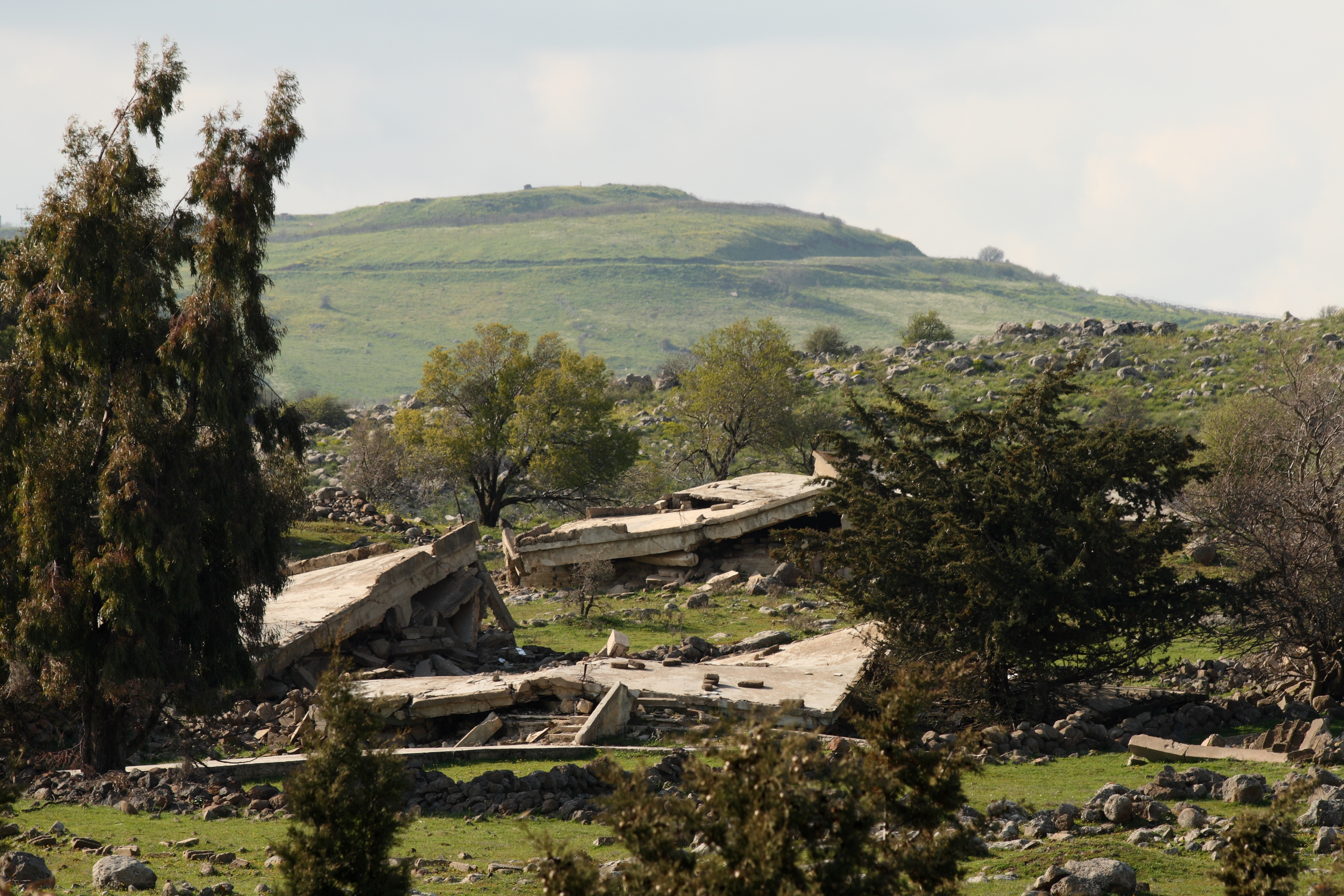
Destroyed buildings in Quneitra

The population of the Golan Heights prior to the 1967 Six-Day War has been estimated between 130,000 and 145,000, including 17,000 Palestinian refugees registered with UNRWA. Between 80,000 and 130,000 Syrians fled or were driven from the Heights during the Six-Day War and around 7,000 remained in the Israeli-held territory in six villages: Majdal Shams, Mas'ade, Buq'ata, Ein Qiniyye, Ghajar and Shayta.

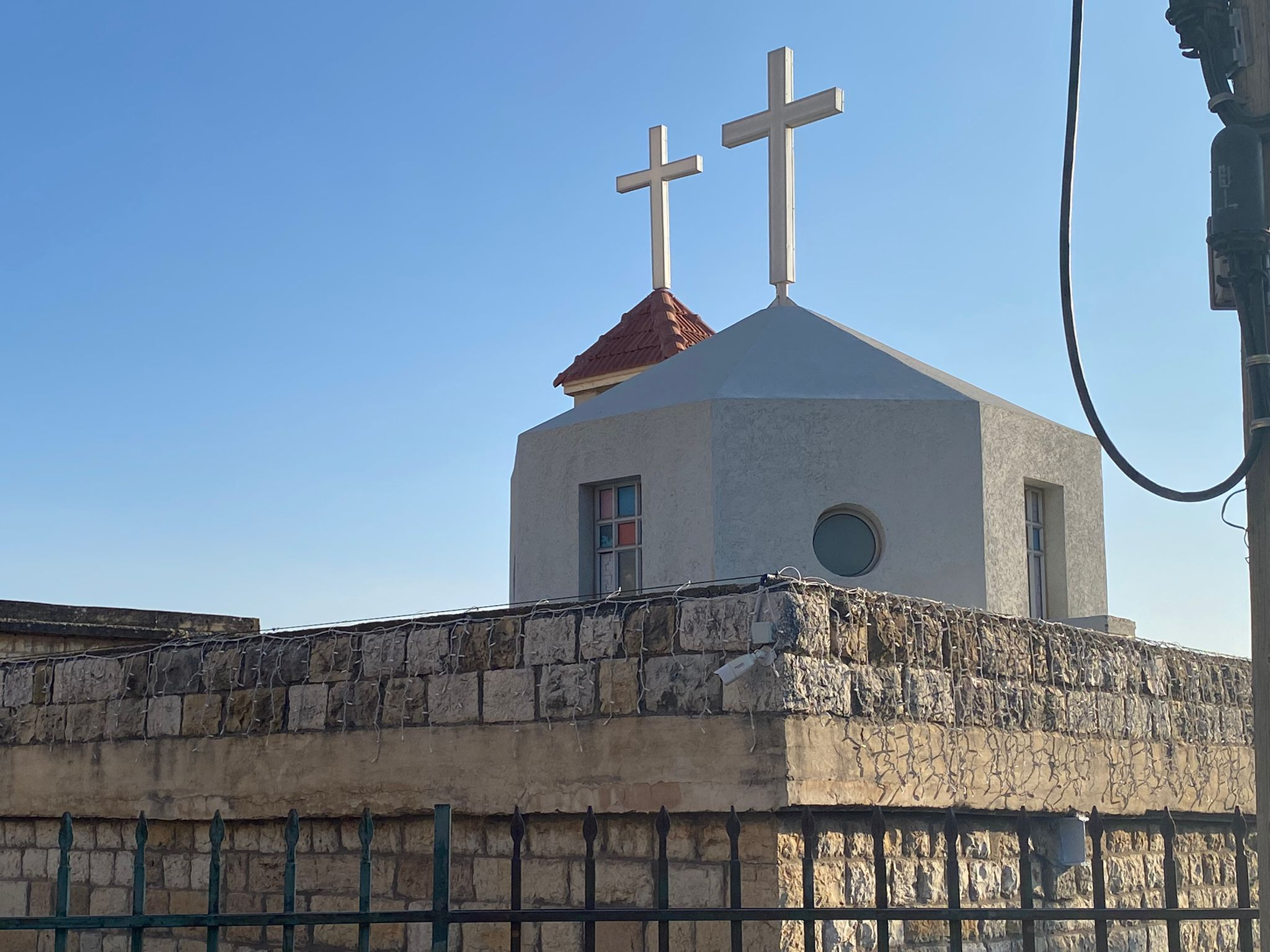
Christian church in Ein Qiniyye

Before the 1967 war, Christians comprised 12% of the total population of the Golan Heights. The vast majority of Christians migrated with the rest of the population after Israel's occupation of the Golan, leaving only a few small Christian families in Majdal Shams and Ein Qiniyye.

Israel forcibly expelled Syrians from the Golan Heights. There were also instances of Israeli soldiers killing Syrian residents including blowing up their home with people inside.

Israel demolished over one hundred Syrian villages and farms in the Golan Heights. After the demolitions, the lands were given to Israeli settlers.

Quneitra was the largest town in the Golan Heights until 1967, with a population of 27,000. It was occupied by Israel on the last day of the Six-Day War and handed back to Syrian civil control per the 1974 Disengagement Agreement. But the Israelis had destroyed Quneitra with dynamite and bulldozers before they withdrew from the city.

East of the 1973 ceasefire line, in the Syrian controlled part of the Golan Heights, an area of 600 km^{2} (232 sq mi), are more than 40 Syrian towns and villages, including Quneitra, Khan Arnabah, al-Hamidiyah, al-Rafid, al-Samdaniyah, al-Mudariyah, Beer Ajam, Bariqa, Ghadir al-Bustan, Hader, Juba, Kodana, Ufaniyah, Ruwayhinah, Nabe' al-Sakhar, Trinjah, Umm al-A'zam, and Umm Batna. The population of the Quneitra Governorate numbers 79,000.

Once annexing the Golan Heights in 1981, the Israeli government offered all non-Israelis living in the Golan citizenship, but until the early 21st century fewer than 10% of the Druze were Israeli citizens; the remainder held Syrian citizenship. The Golan Alawites in the village of Ghajar accepted Israeli citizenship in 1981. In 1982, the Druze community of the Golan Heights held a five-month general strike protesting the Israeli annexation.

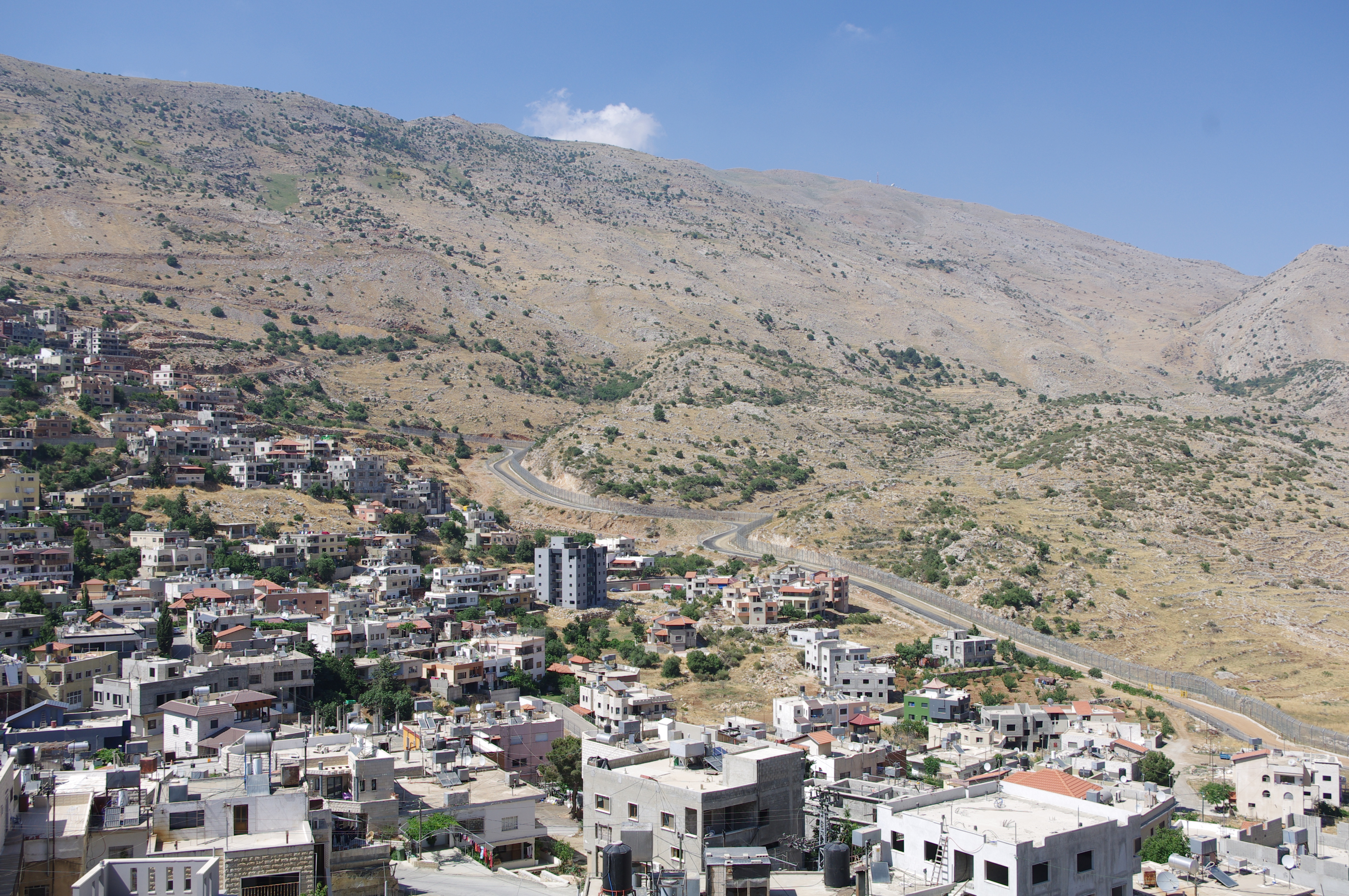
The Druze town of Majdal Shams

The Druze living in the Golan Heights are permanent residents of Israel. They hold laissez-passer documents issued by the Israeli government, and enjoy the country's social-welfare benefits. The pro-Israeli Druze were historically ostracized by the pro-Syrian Druze. Reluctance to accept citizenship also reflects fear of ill treatment or displacement by Syrian authorities should the Golan Heights be returned to Syria. In the 21st century, the number of Druze accepting Israeli citizenship steadily increased; as of 8 March 2026, 10,323 (39.6%) of the 26,066 residents of the four Druze villages of the Israeli-administered Golan Heights were Israeli citizens.

According to The Independent, most Druze in the Golan Heights live relatively comfortable lives in a freer society under Israeli rule than they would have in Syria under Assad's government. According to Egypt's Daily Star, their standard of living vastly surpasses that of their counterparts on the Syrian side of the border. Most of them identify themselves as Syrian, but feel alienated from the "autocratic" government in Damascus and therefore fear of a return to Syrian rule. According to the Associated Press, "many young Druse have been quietly relieved at the failure of previous Syrian–Israeli peace talks to go forward."

On the other hand, expressing pro-Syrian viewpoint, The Economist represents the Golan Druzes' view that by doing so they may be potentially rewarded by Syria, while simultaneously risking nothing in Israel's freewheeling society. The Economist likewise reported that "Some optimists see the future Golan as a sort of Hong Kong, continuing to enjoy the perks of Israel's dynamic economy and open society, while coming back under the sovereignty of a stricter, less developed Syria." The Druze are also reportedly well-educated and relatively prosperous, and have made use of Israel's universities.

Since 1988, Druze clerics have been permitted to make annual religious pilgrimages to Syria. Since 2005, Israel has allowed Druze farmers to export some 11,000 tons of apples to the rest of Syria each year, constituting the first commercial relations between Syria and Israel.

In the first years after the onset of the Syrian civil war, the number of applications for Israeli citizenship grew, although Syrian loyalty remained strong and those who applied for citizenship were often ostracized by members of the older generation. In 2012, there were 20,000 Druze with Syrian citizenship living in the Israeli-occupied portion of the Golan Heights. In recent years, the number of applications for citizenship has increased, 239 in 2021 and 206 in the first half of 2022. A total of 419 citizenship applications were approved in 2022. In 2023, a further 389 citizenship applications were granted, followed by 318 in the first 11 months of 2024. By the end of 2024, official Israeli figures suggest that of approximately 29,000 Druze living in the Golan Heights, about 6,000 (or 20.45 percent) were Israeli citizens. In 2025 and early 2026, applications for Israeli citizenship surged sharply among Druze residents of the Golan Heights. In March 2026, Le Monde reported that, according to an anonymous Druze community observer based in Majdal Shams, before 2023 only about one-third of the Golan Druze held Israeli citizenship, but that the share had since risen to more than half. In January 2025, the IDF recorded the first large-scale enlistment of Golan Druze, with about 120 adults joining, marking a notable increase in recruitment.

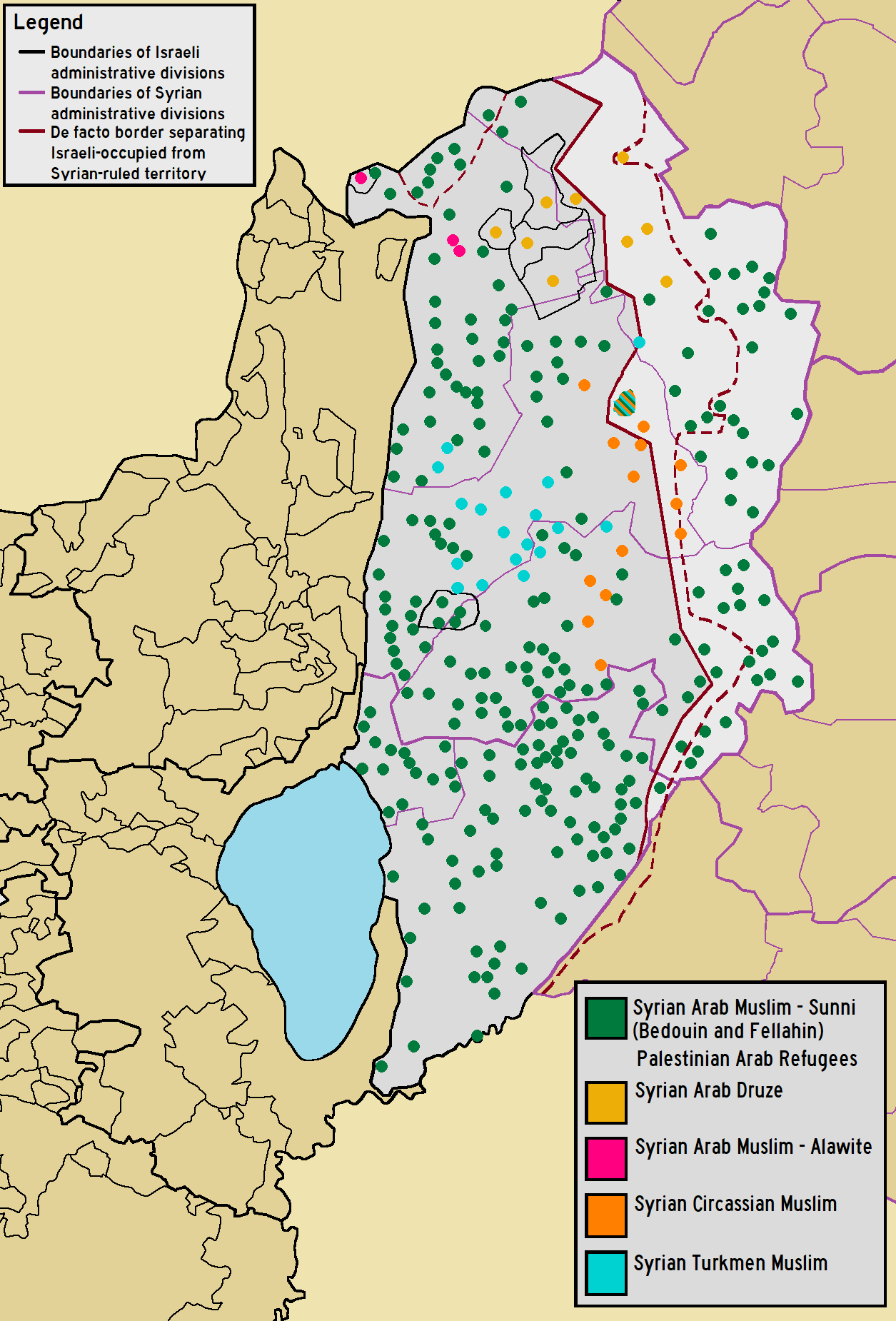
A demographic map of Quneitra Governorate (Golan Heights) before the 1967 six day war

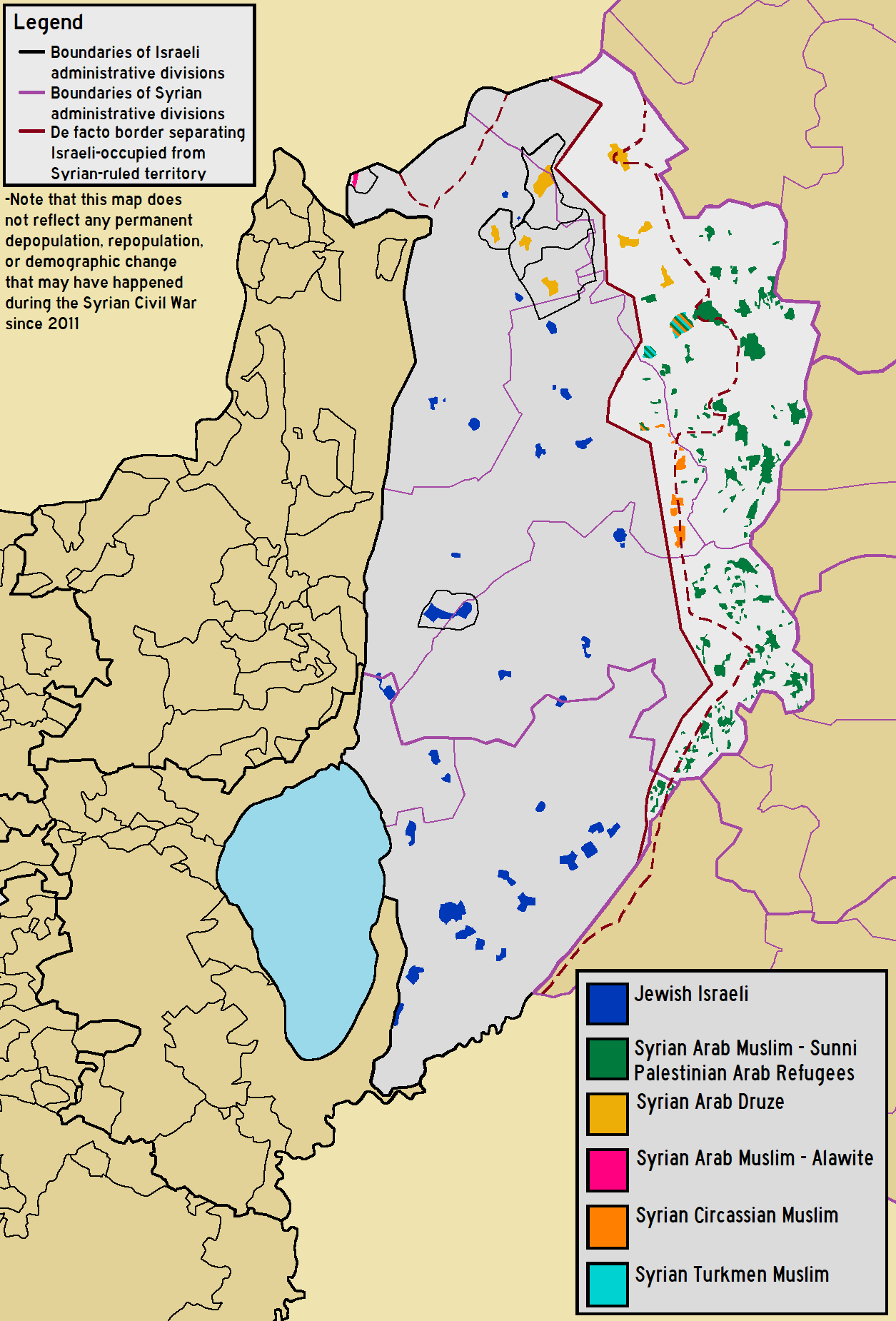
A demographic map of Quneitra Governorate (Golan Heights) today. Excludes any permanent depopulation or repopulation that might have happened during the Syrian civil war

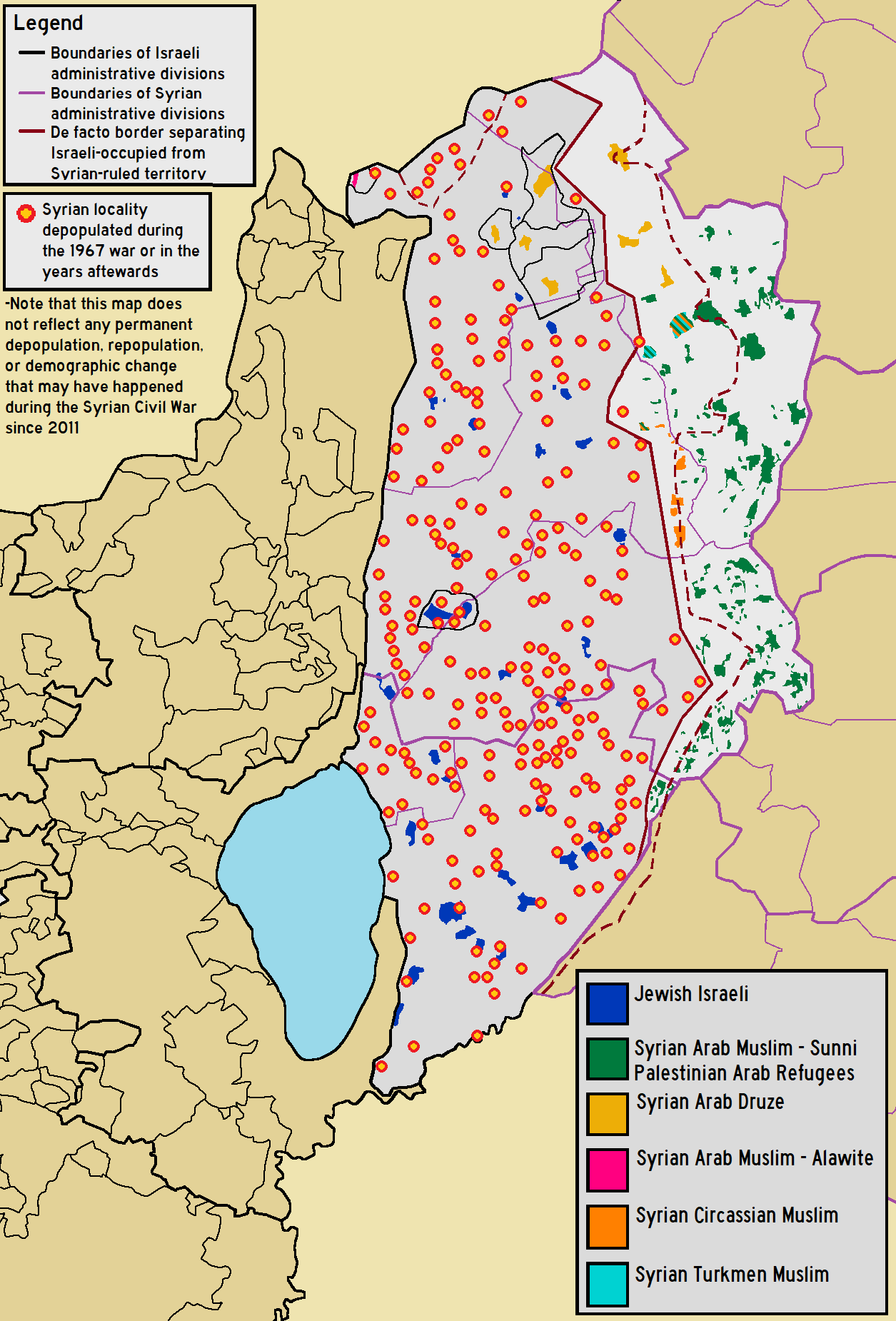
A demographic map of Quneitra Governorate (Golan Heights) overlaid with the location of the depopulated Syrian localities

== Israeli settlements ==
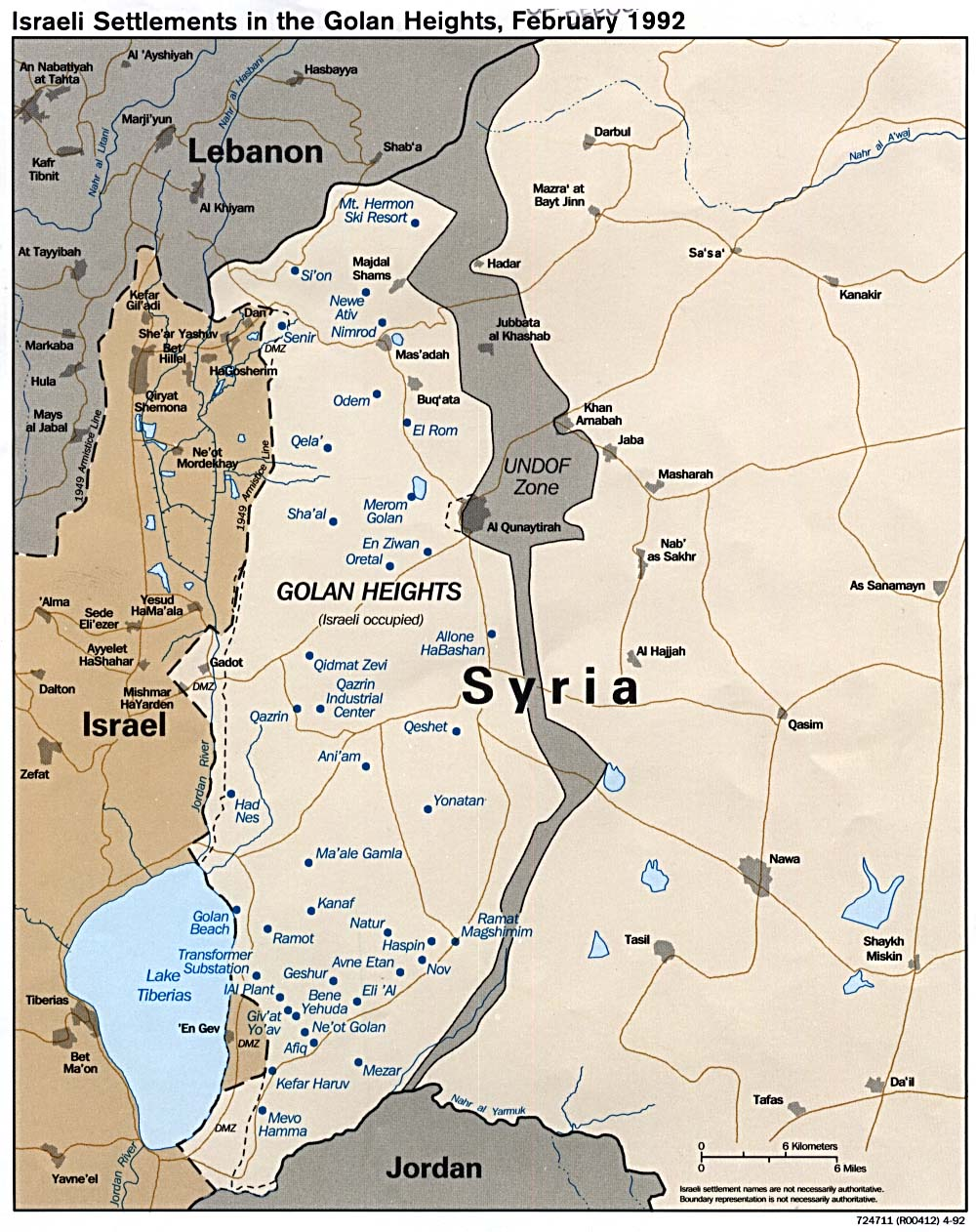
Map of the Israeli settlements in the Golan Heights, 1992

Israeli settlement activity began in the 1970s. The area was governed by military administration until 1981, when Israel passed the Golan Heights Law, extending Israeli law and administration throughout the territory. This move was condemned by the United Nations Security Council in UN Resolution 497, although Israel states it has a right to retain the area, citing the text of UN Resolution 242, adopted after the Six-Day War, which calls for "safe and recognised boundaries free from threats or acts of force". The continued Israeli control of the Golan Heights remains controversial and is still regarded as an occupation by most countries other than Israel and the United States. Israeli settlements and human rights policy in the occupied territory have drawn criticism from the UN.

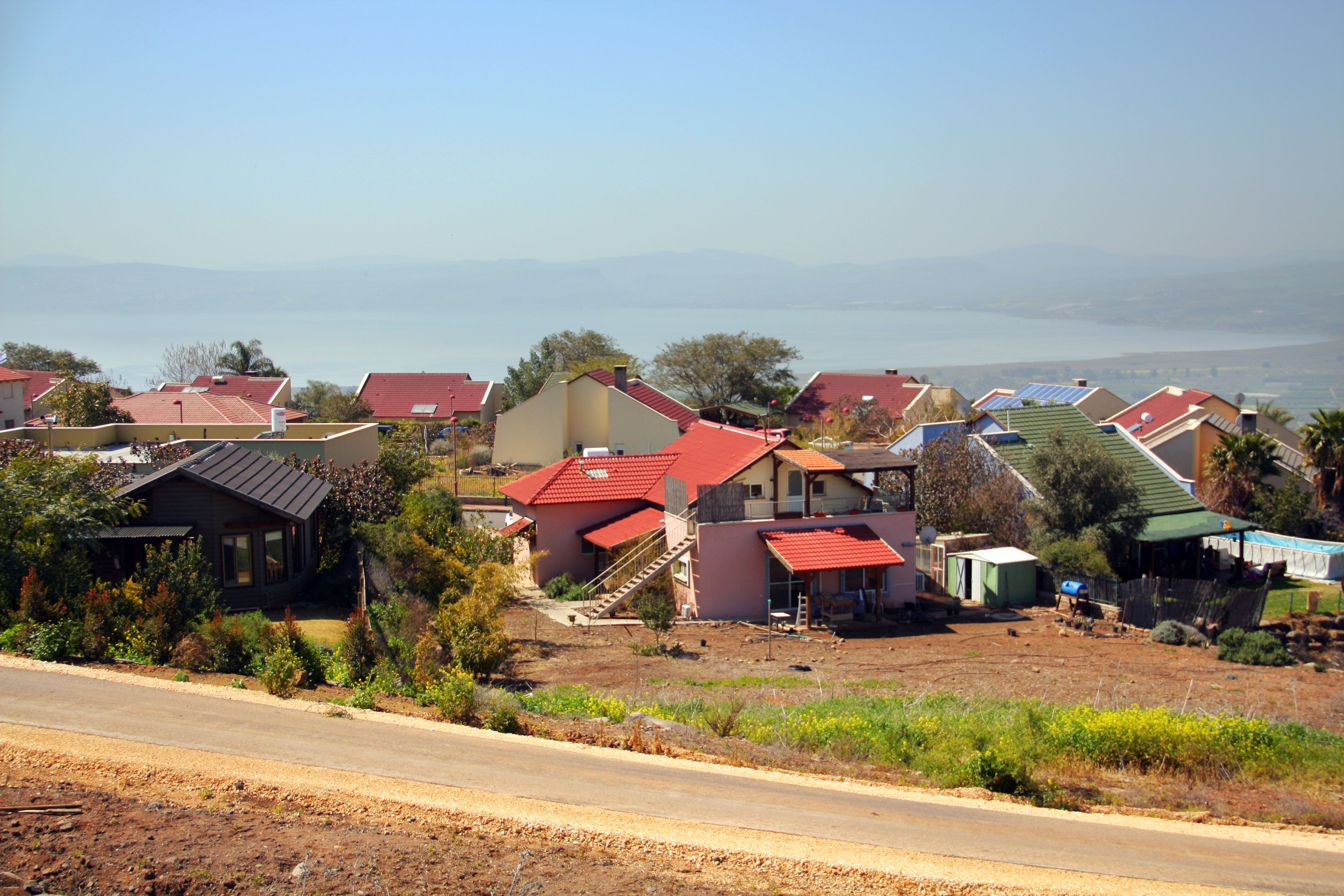
The Israeli settlement of Ma'ale Gamla

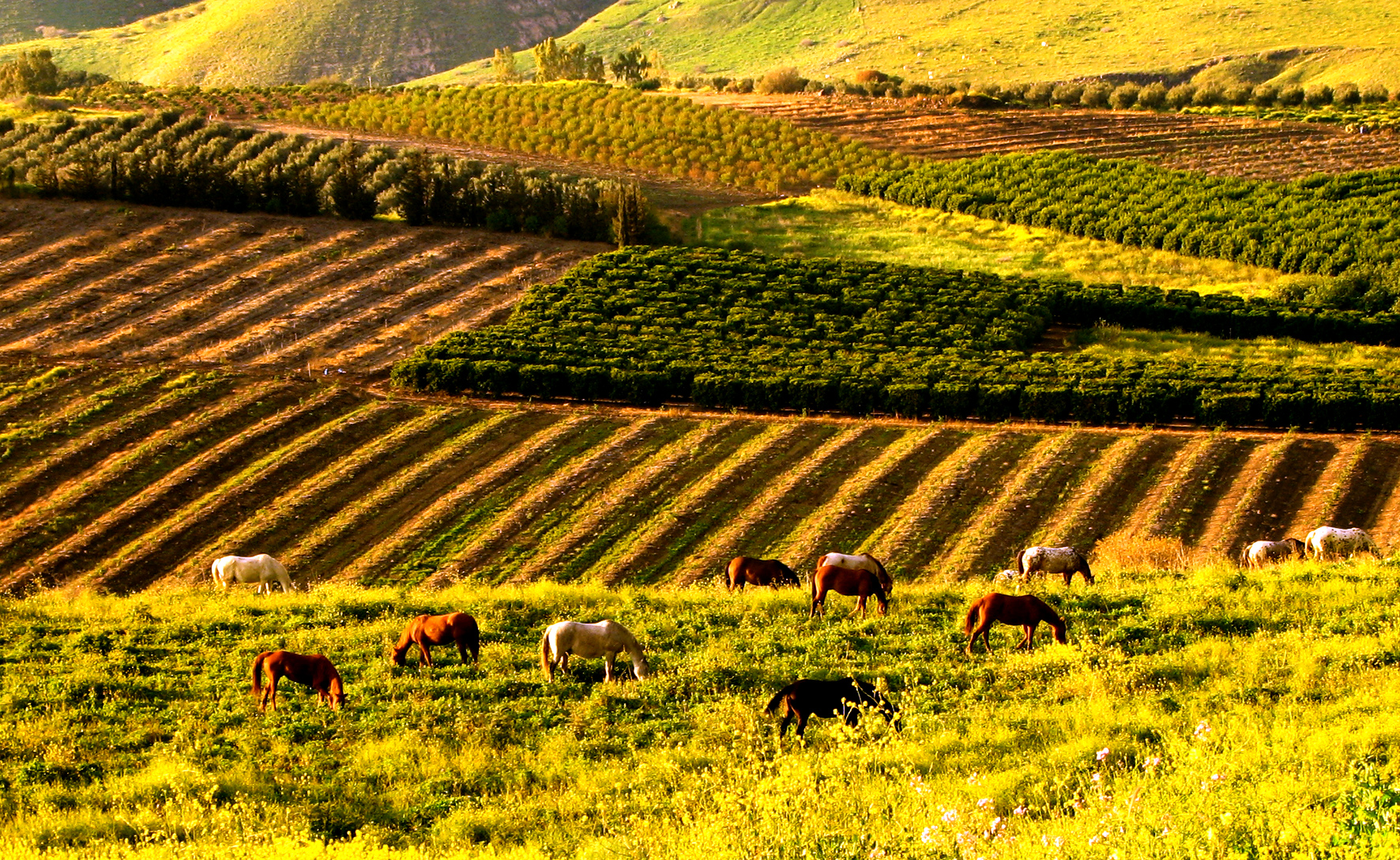
Israeli farms in the Golan Heights

The territory is administered by the Golan Regional Council, based in Katzrin, which has a population of 7,600. There are another 19 moshavim and 10 kibbutzim. In 1989, the Israeli settler population was 10,000, doubling itself by 2010 in a total of 32 settlements. By 2019, the population reached 22,000, and was estimated to be 25,000 in 2021, with plans by the Government of Prime Minister Naftali Bennett to double that population over a five-year period.

On 23 April 2019, Israel Prime Minister Benjamin Netanyahu announced that he would bring a resolution for government approval to name a new community in the Golan Heights after U.S. President Donald Trump. The planned settlement was unveiled as Trump Heights on 16 June 2019. Further plans for settlement expansion on the Golan were part of the agenda of Benjamin Netanyahu's incoming coalition in 2023.

In December 2024, Prime Minister Netanyahu announced an updated plan to further expand settlements on the Golan Heights. As of the end of 2024, the Israeli settler population was estimated to be about 31,000 people.

In August 2026, the Dutch government banned products from Israeli settlements in the Golan Heights.

== Landmarks ==
The Golan Heights features numerous archeological sites, mountains, streams and waterfalls. Throughout the region, 25 ancient synagogues have been found, dating back to the Roman and Byzantine periods.

- Shrine of Abu Dharr al-Ghifari, early Islamic era, located in the eastern Golan.
- Banias (Arabic: بانياس الحولة; Hebrew: בניאס) is an ancient site that developed around a spring once associated with the Greek god Pan. Near the archaeological site is the Banias Waterfall, one of the most powerful waterfalls in the region, plunging about 10 meters into a pool surrounded by lush vegetation. Part of the stream is accessible via a 100-meter-long suspended walkway.
- Deir Qeruh (Arabic: دير قروح; Hebrew: דיר קרוח) is a ruined Byzantine-period and Syrian village. Founded in the 4th century CE, it has a monastery and church of St George from the 6th century. The church has a square apse – a feature known from ancient Syria and Jordan but not present in churches west of the Jordan River.
- Kursi (Arabic: الكرسي; Hebrew: כורסי) is an archaeological site and national park on the shore of the Sea of Galilee at the foothills of the Golan, containing the ruins of a Byzantine Christian monastery and is traditionally identified as the location of Jesus' Miracle of the Swine (Gergesa).
- Katzrin (Arabic: قصرين; Hebrew: קצרין) is the administrative and commercial center of the Israeli-occupied Golan Heights. Katzrin Ancient Village is an archaeological site on the outskirts of Katzrin where the remains of a Talmud-era village and synagogue have been reconstructed. The site has been described by an archeologist as being developed: "with a clear agenda and nationalistic narrative." It has also been criticized for distorting historical items and showing a selective part of history, focusing on the Jewish period leaving out the Mamluk and Syrian periods. Golan Archaeological Museum hosts archaeological finds uncovered in the Golan Heights from prehistoric times. A special focus concerns Gamla and excavations of synagogues and Byzantine churches.

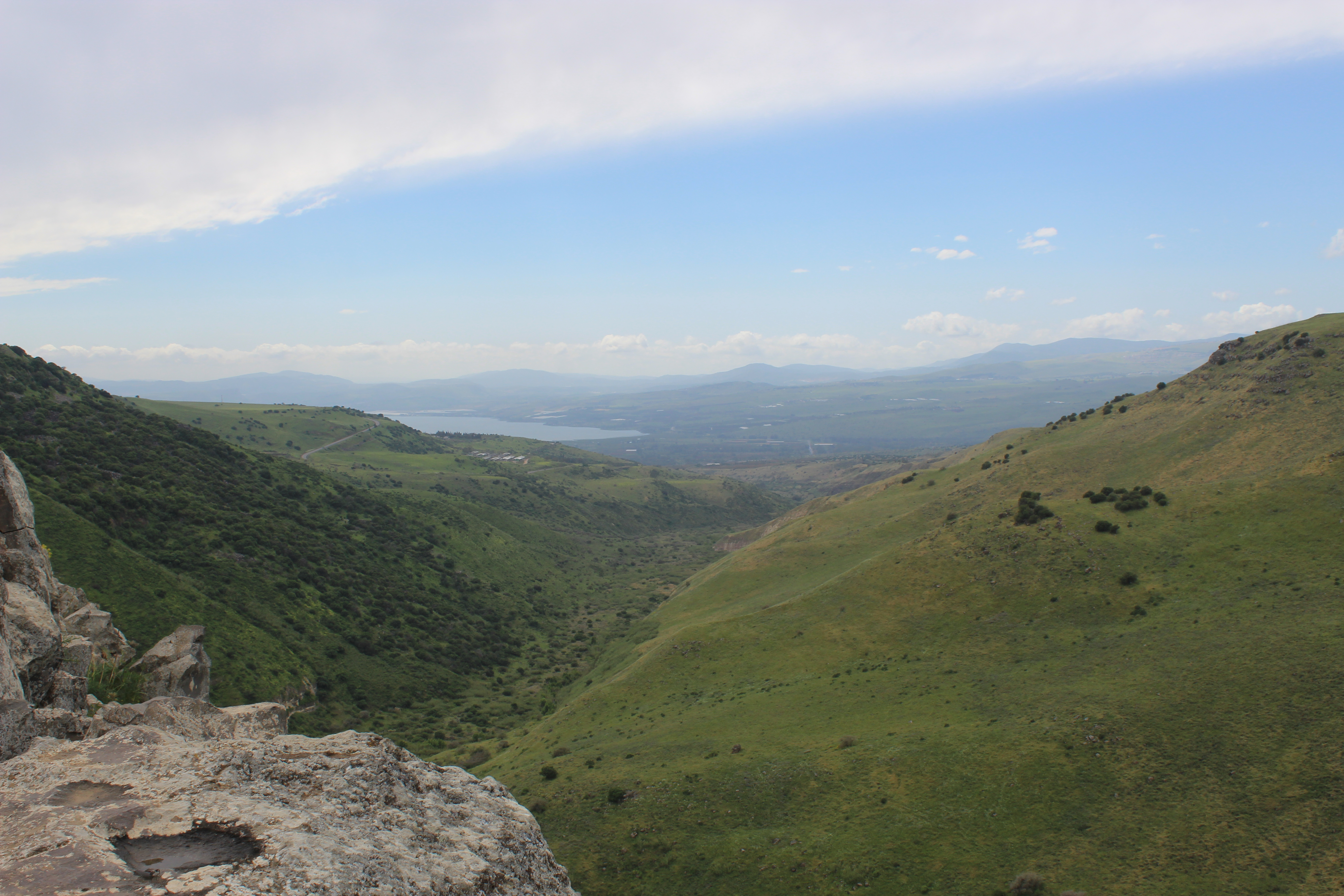
The Sea of Galilee as seen from the Golan

- Gamla nature reserve (Hebrew: שמורת טבע גמלא) is an open park with the archaeological remains of the ancient Jewish city of Gamla (Hebrew: גמלא, Arabic: جمالا) — including a tower, wall and synagogue. It is also the site of a large waterfall, an ancient Byzantine church, and a panoramic spot to observe the nearly 100 vultures that dwell in the cliffs. Israeli scientists study the vultures and tourists can watch them fly and nest.
- A ski resort on the slopes of Mount Hermon (Arabic: جبل الشيخ; הר חרמון) features a wide range of ski trails and activities. The first lift was installed in 1971 and the resort first opened to skiers in December 1971. Since 1972, the resort has been operated and held by the residents of the nearby Moshav of Neve Ativ. The Lake Ram crater lake is nearby.

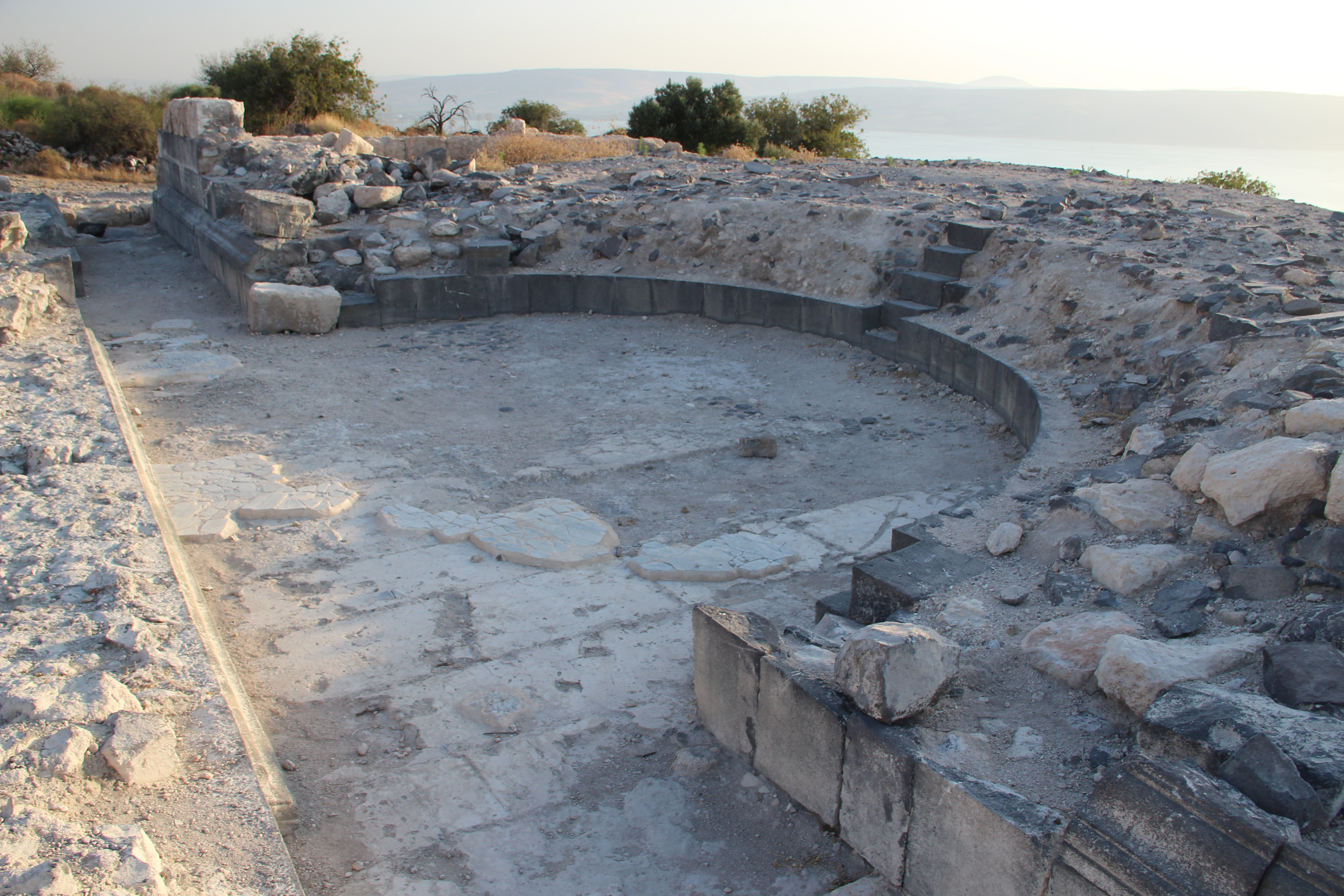
Hippos odeon

- Hippos (Arabic: قلعة الحصن; Hebrew: סוסיתא) is an ancient Greco-Roman city, known in Arabic as Qal'at al-Hisn and in Aramaic as Susita. The archaeological site includes excavations of the city's forum, the small imperial cult temple, a large Hellenistic temple compound, the Roman city gates, and two Byzantine churches.
- The Nimrod Castle (Arabic: لعة الصبيبة; Hebrew: מבצר נמרוד) was built in the 13th century to defend against the Crusaders, served the Ayyubids and Mamluks, and was captured only once, in 1260, by the Mongols. It is now located inside a nature reserve.

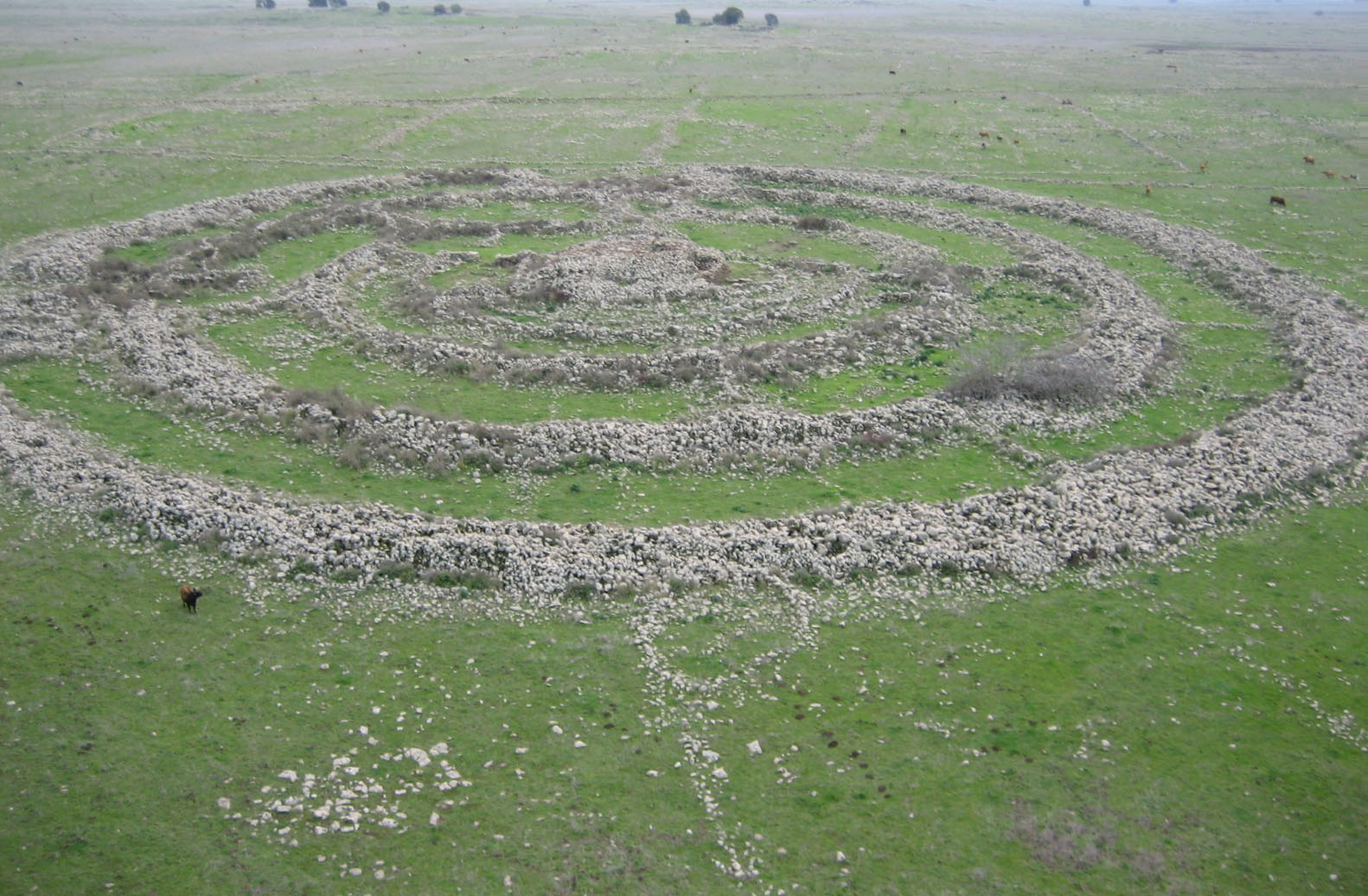
Rujm el-Hiri

- Rujm el-Hiri (Arabic: رجم الهري; Hebrew: גלגל רפאים) is a large circular stone monument. Excavations since 1968 have not uncovered material remains common to archaeological sites in the region. Archaeologists believe the site may have been a ritual center linked to a cult of the dead. A 3D model of the site exists in the Museum of Golan Antiquities in Katzrin.
- Senaim (Arabic: جبل الحلاوة; Hebrew: הר סנאים) is an archaeological site in northern Golan Heights that includes both Roman and Ancient Greek temples. Byzantine and Mamluk coins have also been found at this site.
- Tell Hadar (Hebrew: תל הדר) is an Aramean archaeological site.
- Umm el-Qanatir (Arabic: ام القناطر; Hebrew: עין קשתות, Ein Keshatot) is another impressive set of standing ruins of a village of the Byzantine era. The site includes a very large synagogue and two arches next to a natural spring.

== Economy ==
=== Viticulture ===
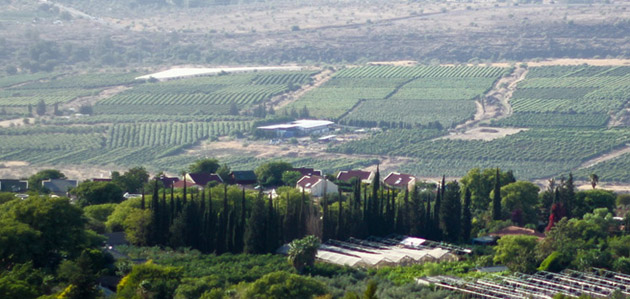
The vineyard behind the Israeli settlement of Ma'ale Gamla.

On a visit to Israel and the Golan Heights in 1972, Cornelius Ough, a professor of viticulture and oenology at the University of California, Davis, pronounced conditions in the Golan very suitable for the cultivation of wine grapes. A consortium of four kibbutzim and four moshavim took up the challenge, clearing 250 burnt-out tanks in the Golan's Valley of Tears to plant vineyards for what would eventually become the Golan Heights Winery. The first vines were planted in 1976, and the first wine was released by the winery in 1983. As of 2012, The Heights are home to about a dozen wineries.

=== Oil and gas exploration ===
In the early 1990s, the Israel National Oil Company (INOC) was granted shaft-sinking permits in the Golan Heights. It estimated a recovery potential of two million barrels of oil, equivalent at the time to $24 million. During the Yitzhak Rabin administration (1992–1995), the permits were suspended as efforts were undertaken to restart peace negotiations between Israel and Syria. In 1996, Benjamin Netanyahu granted preliminary approval to INOC to proceed with oil exploration drilling in the Golan.

INOC began undergoing a process of privatization in 1997, overseen by then-Director of the Government Companies Authority (GCA), Tzipi Livni. During that time, it was decided that INOC's drilling permits would be returned to the state. In 2012, National Infrastructure Minister Uzi Landau approved exploratory drilling for oil and natural gas in the Golan. The following year, the Petroleum Council of Israel's Ministry of Energy and Water Resources secretly awarded a drilling license covering half the area of the Golan Heights to a local subsidiary of New Jersey–based Genie Energy Ltd. headed by Effi Eitam.

Human rights groups have said that the drilling violates international law, as the Golan Heights are an occupied territory.

On 18 November 2021, the United Nations Second Committee approved a draft resolution that demanded that: "Israel, the occupying Power, cease the exploitation, damage, cause of loss or depletion and endangerment of the natural resources in the Occupied Palestinian Territory, including East Jerusalem, and in the occupied Syrian Golan".

== See also ==
- Al-Marsad
- Borders of Israel
- Israeli-occupied territories
- Front for the Liberation of the Golan
- Golan Heights wind farm
- Golan Regiment, a Syrian para-military force
- Independent Israel–Syria peace initiatives
- International law and the Arab–Israeli conflict
- Israel–Syria relations
- Petroleum Road
- Shouting Hill
- UN Security Council Resolution 242
- UN Security Council Resolution 452
- UN Security Council Resolution 465
- UN Security Council Resolution 471
- United Nations General Assembly Resolution 66/225

== Bibliography ==
- Abbasi, Mustafa; Seltenreich, Yair (2007). "A Leader on Both Sides of the Border: The Amir Fa'our al-Fa'our Between Syria and Mandatory Palestine". Holy Land Studies. 6 (1): 23–49. doi:10.3366/hls.2007.0013.
- Abbasi, Mustafa; Raphael, Kate (December 2024). "Historical geographies of a Damascan population crisis: Jawlān and Ḥawrān in the late Mamluk - early Ottoman periods". Journal of Historical Geography. 86: 297–310. doi:10.1016/j.jhg.2024.09.002.
- Biger, Gideon (2005). The Boundaries of Modern Palestine, 1840–1947. London: Routledge. ISBN 978-0-7146-5654-0.
- Assis, Royee (2016), "Bab el-Hawa", Hadashot Arkheologiyot, 128
- Boutz, Jennifer Hill (2009), Hassan ibn Thabit, a True Mukhadram: A Study of the Ghassanid Odes of Hassan ibn Thabit, Digital Georgetown
- Boytner, R.; Dodd, L.S.; Parker, B.J. (2010). Controlling the Past, Owning the Future: The Political Uses of Archaeology in the Middle East. University of Arizona Press. ISBN 978-0-8165-2795-3.
- Bregman, Ahron (2002). Israel's Wars: A History Since 1947. London: Routledge. ISBN 978-0-415-28716-6.
- Chatty, Dawn (1977). "Leaders, Land, and Limousines: Emir versus Sheikh". Ethnology. 16 (4): 385–397. doi:10.2307/3773263. JSTOR 3773263.
- Cordesman, Anthony H. (2008). Israel and Syria: The Military Balance and Prospects of War. Greenwood Publishing. ISBN 978-0-313-35520-2.
- Decker, Michael (1 July 2009). "7". Tilling the Hateful Earth. Oxford University Press. doi:10.1093/acprof:oso/9780199565283.003.0005. ISBN 978-0-19-956528-3.
- Elad, Amikam (1999). "The Southern Golan in the Early Muslim Period: The Significance of Two Newly Discovered Milestones of Ἁbd al-Malik". Der Islam. 76 (1). doi:10.1515/islm.1999.76.1.33.
- Finkelstein, N.G. (2003). Image and Reality of the Israel-Palestine Conflict. Verso Books. ISBN 978-1-85984-442-7.
- Hoyland, Robert (January 2009). "Late Roman Provincia Arabia, Monophysite Monks and Arab Tribes: a Problem of Centre and Periphery". Semitica et Classica. 2: 117–139. doi:10.1484/J.SEC.1.100513.
- Kaufman, Asher (2013). Contested Frontiers in the Syria-Lebanon-Israel Region. Woodrow Wilson Center Press and Johns Hopkins University Press.
- Louis, Wm. Roger (1969). "The United Kingdom and the Beginning of the Mandates System, 1919–1922". International Organization. 23 (1): 73–96. doi:10.1017/S0020818300025534.
- Maar'i, Tayseer; Halabi, Usama (1992). "Life under occupation in the Golan Heights". Journal of Palestine Studies. 22: 78–93. doi:10.1525/jps.1992.22.1.00p0166n.
- Maoz, Asher (1994). "Application of Israeli law to the Golan Heights is annexation". Brooklyn Journal of International Law. 20 (2): 355–396.
- Ma'oz, Zvi Uri (2008). The Ghassānids and the Fall of the Golan Synagogues.
- Morris, Benny (2001). Righteous Victims. New York: Vintage Books. ISBN 978-0-679-74475-7.
- Richard, Suzanne (2003). Near Eastern Archaeology: A Reader. Eisenbrauns. ISBN 978-1-57506-083-5.
- Schumacher, G. (1888). The Jaulân: surveyed for the German Society for the Exploration of the Holy Land. London: Richard Bentley & Son. OCLC 1142389290.
- Shahîd, Irfan (1995). Byzantium and the Arabs in the Sixth Century, part one. Vol. 2. Dumbarton Oaks. ISBN 978-0-88402-284-8.
- Shahîd (2), Irfan (1995). Byzantium and the Arabs in the Sixth Century, part two. Vol. 2. Dumbarton Oaks.
- Sheleff, Leon (1994). "Application of Israeli law to the Golan Heights is not annexation". Brooklyn Journal of International Law. 20 (2): 333–353.
- Sivan, Hagith (2008). Palestine in Late Antiquity. Oxford University Press. ISBN 9780191608674.
- Myers, E. A. (2010), The Ituraeans and The Roman Near East - Reassessing The Sources (Society For New Testament Studies Monograph Series)
- Sulimani, Gideon; Kletter, Raz (April 2022). "Settler-Colonialism and the Diary of an Israeli Settler in the Golan Heights: The Notebooks of Izhaki Gal". Journal of Holy Land and Palestine Studies. 21 (1): 48–71. doi:10.3366/hlps.2022.0283.
- Tsafrir, Y. (1982). "הפרובינציות בארץ ישראל — שמות , גבולות ותחומי מינהל" [The Provinces in Eretz-Israel, Names Borders and Administrative Boundaries]. In Baras, Z.; Safrai, S.; Tsafrir, Y.; Stern, M. (eds.). Eretz-Israel from the Destruction of the Second Temple to the Muslim Conquest (in Hebrew). Jerusalem: Yad Ben Zvi. pp. 350–386. ISBN 965-217-006-2.
- Tsioni, Gil (2010). "A Mameluke Grape-Honey Treading Installation in the Golan Heights, Israel". Israel Exploration Journal. 60 (2): 222–244. JSTOR 27927265.
- Zisser, Eyal (2002). "June 1967: Israel's capture of the Golan Heights". Israel Studies. 7 (1): 168–194. doi:10.2979/ISR.2002.7.1.168.
