= Daraa offensive (March–April 2016) =

Military operation

- Part of the Daraa Governorate campaign and the Inter-rebel conflict of the Syrian Civil War
Date	21 March – 8 April 2016 (2 weeks and 4 days)
Location	Daraa Governorate, Syria
Result	Rebel victory: ISIL captures nine towns and villages; Rebels recapture all towns and villages from ISIL; Pro-opposition "al-Murabitin Brigade" defects from the pro-ISIL Islamic Muthanna Movement; Islamic Muthanna Movement loses almost all of its territory and merges with the Yarmouk Martyrs Brigade

Belligerents
Free Syrian Army; Ahrar ash-Sham; Jaysh al-Islam al-Nusra Front al-Murabitin Brigade (since 28 March)	Islamic State

Commanders and leaders
Abu Salah al-Masalma † (al-Nusra general commander of Daraa Governorate); Abu Adham † (al-Nusra commander of Tasil); Abu Kinan al-Sharif (commander of the Yarmouk Army); Hussein Massaid (Southern Front field commander)	Abu Abdullah al-Madani (Yarmouk Martyrs Brigade emir); Abu Tahrir † (Yarmouk Martyrs Brigade field commander); Unknown Yarmouk Martyrs Brigade commander †; Abu Ayyub (Muthanna Movement emir); Abu Omar Sawa'iq (Muthanna Movement second-in-command); Muhammad Refa`ie † (Muthanna Movement general commander); Abu Umar † (Muthanna Movement field commander); Abu Obeid Sheikh Saad † (Muthanna Movement field commander); Abu Abdul Karim (POW) (Muthanna Movement commander in Daraa city) (Islamic State) Ahmad Sameera (Ansar al-Aqsa commander) (Islamic State) Malek Faisal (Ansar al-Aqsa commander)

Units involved
Free Syrian Army; Southern Front; "House of Justice" operations room; Yarmouk Army; al-Moutazz Billah Brigade; Muhajerin and Ansar Brigade; Dawn of Islam Division; Youth of Sunna Forces; Sham Liberation Army; Omari Brigades; Hamza Division; First Army; Alwiya al-Furqan; Mujahideen of Hawran Brigades; Martyr Raed al-Masri Brigade; Liwa Awwal Mahaam Khassa; Jasim Military Council	Yarmouk Martyrs Brigade; Islamic Muthanna Movement (Islamic State) Ansar al-Aqsa

Strength
Unknown: 60+ (al-Murabitin Brigade)	800–1,200+: c. 100 in Inkhil

Casualties and losses
- 93 fighters killed on both sides (per pro-Syrian gov. source); 25 civilians killed (several executed by ISIL); 8,200 civilians displaced

The Daraa offensive (March–April 2016) was a military operation of two groups allegedly affiliated with the Islamic State, the Yarmouk Martyrs Brigade and the Islamic Muthanna Movement, against Syrian opposition forces in the Daraa Governorate.

== Background ==
The Muthanna Islamic Movement was accused of kidnappings of Daraa officials and FSA commanders, which the Movement denied. Several of the prisoners were freed by the Yarmouk Army later. Muthanna was also alleged to have cooperated with the Islamic State.

In midst of the Second Battle of Al-Shaykh Maskin on 23 January 2016, against the Syrian Armed Forces, conflict erupted between the Muthanna Movement and the Yarmouk Army after the Movement blocked the road leading to the town. The Syrian Army was able to capture the town two days later.

== The offensive ==
The first major clashes already broke out a week before the offensive.

On 21 March 2016, the Yarmouk Martyrs Brigade and the Islamic Muthanna Movement, both of which were accused of being Islamic State of Iraq and the Levant affiliates, stormed the towns of Tasil and Adwan after several hours-long fierce battles with the al-Nusra Front, Ahrar ash-Sham and the Martyr Raed al-Masri Brigade of the Free Syrian Army. At least two important al-Nusra military commanders were killed during the clashes: Abu Salah al-Masalma, general commander of Daraa Governorate, and Abu Adham, commander of Tasil. After suffering many casualties, opposition forces were eventually forced to retreat to Nawa. ISIL fighters went on to execute a number of residents in the captured towns, and broadcast an appeal over the local mosques' loudspeakers for the rebels to choose between “allegiance, surrendering their arms, or staying home.” In response to the ISIL takeover, many Tasil residents fled into the countryside. Afterwards, the Yarmouk Martyrs Brigade erected earth mounds around Tasil in order to fortify the town against rebel counter-attacks, and advanced further along the main road from Tasil to Nawa. ISIL forces also began to besiege al-Nusra Front and Ahrar ash-Sham troops in the villages of Saham al-Jawlan and Heit al-Latin. Subsequently, large numbers of opposition reinforcements were sent to southwestern Daara in order to halt the ISIL incursions. On the same day, ISIL forces detonated a suicide car bomb in Kherab Shahen, and targeted Tel Jomo with heavy machine guns and mortars. However, while the Islamic Muthanna Movement's western main branch aligned itself with ISIL forces, its eastern branch in Daraa city pledged only to fight the government. Nevertheless, family members of al-Nusra leader Abu Salah al-Masalma attacked vehicles of the eastern branch after hearing of his death.

The next day, Islamic Muthanna Movement fighters blew up the bridge linking Jalin, their main base, and Muzayrib in order to hinder opposition reinforcements from attacking their core area. Rebel troops also unsuccessfully attempted to regain Adwan.

By 23 March, the Yarmouk Martyrs Brigade once again broke through rebel defenses, with Tafas and Muzayrib becoming contested. One Yarmouk Martyrs Brigade commander was killed during these battles. On the same day, al-Nusra Front and other Islamist rebel reinforcements entered Zayzoun, Tal Shehab and Sahem el-Jolan, and launched a counterattack on Tasil. Around 100 isolated ISIL fighters, belonging to the al-Nusra splinter group "Ansar al-Aqsa", also entrenched themselves in Inkhil, in the northern part of Daraa Governorate. Although these ISIL fighters had already been in conflict with local rebel groups for some time, the Hamza Division, the Mujahideen of Hawran Brigades and al-Nusra expelled Ansar al-Aqsa from Inkhil, soon after the offensive's beginning.

The Yarmouk Martyrs Brigade continued its advance on 24 March, when it captured most of Saham al-Jawlan from the al-Nusra Front and Ahrar ash-Sham. Most of Ahrar ash-Sham's forces were killed or captured during the battle, with remainder fleeing the city. Nevertheless, pockets of rebel troops continued their resistance in the city. With Saham al-Jawlan mostly under their control, ISIL forces completely surrounded a large number of rebel troops in the nearby town of Hayt. Meanwhile, rebel forces managed to repel the attacks on Tafas and Muzayrib. The Yarmouk Martyrs Brigade also targeted Nawa with heavy artillery strikes, killing many civilians. In response to the ISIL offensive, several Southern Front units, among them the prominent Yarmouk Army, formed the "House of Justice" operations room to push ISIL out of the Daraa Governorate. In the night from the 24 to 25 March, ISIL launched an assault against Hayt.

The next day, the Military Council of Jasim declared it would prosecute any group or elements in the city that belong to the Yarmouk Martyrs Brigade or the Islamic Muthanna Movement in response to the ISIL offensive. Suspects were given 12 hours to turn themselves in, while civilians were threatened with consequences if they harbored ISIL members.

On 26 March, opposition forces launched a counter-attack. In the morning, Southern Front units recaptured the strategic hilltop of Tal Samin, which overlooks Tasil, from the Islamic Muthanna Movement. The Yarmouk Army launched attacks on several positions of the Yarmouk Martyrs Brigade. Islamist rebel forces also shelled Tasil, while clashes continued around al-Tera and Shekh Sa’d. Rebel fighters attacked Jalin, which is under the Islamic Muthanna Movement's control. The Yarmouk Martyrs Brigade announced it would give remaining opposition forces in Saham al-Jawlan one day to retreat before destroying them. Despite this, the rebel forces in the city, backed by the al-Nusra Front, continued to resist, causing ISIL forces to shell their positions with artillery. In Tafas, a car-bomb by ISIL targeted the base of the al-Moutazz Billah Brigade, killing four of its fighters and injuring tens of others. In A-Sheikh Saad, Islamic Muthanna Movement fighters fired upon and dispersed a civilian demonstration calling for an end of the fighting.

On 28 March, clashes continued around Hayt, with the Yarmouk Martyrs Brigade and the al-Nusra Front shelling each other's positions. Ahrar ash-Sham units in Hayt announced they had successfully driven off a major ISIL attack on the town, killing "dozens" of enemy fighters. One of those reportedly killed was a Muthanna Movement field commander, Abu Umar. On the same day, the Islamic Muthanna Movement fragmented, as its eastern elements in Daraa city defected and formed the independent, pro-opposition "al-Murabitin Brigade". Disagreeing with their parent movement's military activity against other rebels, the new group announced that they had “decided to leave the militant group [ISIL] after its aggression against our people in the Horan region [Daraa province] which claimed the lives of a number of innocent civilians.” They consequently removed their pro-ISIL section commander, Abu Abd al-Karim, from power. At least 60 Islamic Muthanna Movement fighters joined the new brigade.

By 30 March, the ISIL offensive had been largely stalled by Syrian opposition groups, with the latter recapturing the al-Anfah checkpoint and the towns of Tel Kawkab and Tel Kharba. Nevertheless, clashes between the Yarmouk Martyrs Brigade and the al-Nusra Front continued around Tasil, resulting in several casualties on both sides. The Islamic Muthanna Movement also captured Sheikh Saad after disrupting the town's defenses by bombing the local rebel headquarters. Abu Obeid Sheikh Saad, the Muthanna commander of the assault, was killed during the battle. Meanwhile, the situation of the civilian population of the Yarmouk Basin became increasingly dire, as thousands fled into the countryside to avoid the fighting. According to local activists, the region is “on the brink of a humanitarian disaster.”

On 31 March, Syrian opposition forces launched yet another counter-attack in an attempt to recapture Tasil and Sheikh Saad, suffering several casualties. At the same time, another ISIL attack on Hayt was beaten back by local rebel fighters.

On 1 April, rebel forces managed to gain control of some parts of Tasil in course of a fierce battle with the Yarmouk Martyrs Brigade and the Islamic Muthanna Movement. At the same time, opposition groups also launched an attack on Sheikh Saad, while rebel fighters in Hayt attempted to break the ISIL siege. The ISIL groups responded by attacking opposition-held areas in Lajat and Hosh Hammad in order to force opposition groups to divert their forces. Part of the latter attacks was a failed assassination attempt on Fares Adib al-Baydar, former leader of the FSA-affiliated Omari Brigades.

The next day, rebel forces announced they had seized control of Jalin, the Islamic Muthanna Movement's headquarters, after a fierce battle, which the latter denied the next day. Opposition fighters also advanced on Tasil and Sheikh Saad.

On 3 April, the combined forces of the al-Nusra Front, Ahrar ash-Sham, and several FSA groups broke through ISIL defenses at many parts of the front, capturing Sheikh Saad, al-Tairah, Nah and Al-A’jami and fully securing Jalin. They also broke the siege on rebel troops at Hayt, and killed dozens of ISIL fighters. Among those killed was Muhammad Refa`i.e., the general commander of the Islamic Muthanna Movement. ISIL forces responded to the counter-offensive by targeting rebels in Jalin with two car bombs, killing two civilians and injuring dozens others.

On 4 April, units of Jaysh al-Islam, Ahrar ash-Sham, and the Southern Front recaptured Adwan from ISIL forces. In course of the battle, a prominent Yarmouk Martyrs Brigade commander was killed: Abu Tahrir, a Jordanian who had defected from the Syria Revolutionaries Front in 2015. After the major rebel gains of the 3 and 4 April, the Islamic Muthanna Movement had lost most of its territory. The movement's remaining forces consequently retreated into areas held by the Yarmouk Martyrs Brigade. In order to stall the rebel counter-offensive, ISIL reportedly began to resort on the mass use of suicide bombers.

Two days later, ISIL fighters recaptured Adwan from the Free Syrian Army and Ahrar ash-Sham. Afterwards, they hung dead opposition fighters on electricity poles around the town. Still, on 7 April, rebel forces recaptured Sahem el-Jolan and Adwan once again, and the next day, they were also able to push ISIL out of Tasil.

== Aftermath ==
After losing most of its territory and suffering from the defection of its eastern branch, there were reports that the Islamic Muthanna Movement would merge with the Yarmouk Martyrs Brigade under the latter's leadership. In late April, the rebels continued to advance against ISIL forces in the area and captured the Saham al-Jawlan lake. In late May, Yarmouk Martyrs Brigade and Islamic Muthanna Movement actually merged into the Khalid ibn al-Walid Army, after the Muthanna Movement's second-in-command, Abu Omar Sawa'iq, who had opposed the merger, died under suspicious circumstances.

On 3 July, clashes broke out in Inkhil between Southern Front groups and ISIL sleeper cells, leading al-Masdar News to speculate that remnants of Ansar al-Aqsa remained active in the town despite having been officially expelled during the offensive.

On 20 February 2017, ISIL launched a large-scale offensive which resulted in them recapturing Tasil and nearly doubling their territory in the Yarmouk basin. This came more than a week after the rebels launched an offensive in Daraa city and redeployed fighters from the front with ISIL to the front with government forces.

== See also ==
- Daraa Governorate campaign
- List of wars and battles involving ISIL
