= Jamla =

Jamla جملة
- Village
- Location within Syria
- Coordinates: 32°48′22″N 35°51′3″E
- Grid position: 229/245 PAL
- Country: (Syrian opposition) Syria
- Governorate: Daraa
- District: Daraa
- Subdistrict: al-Shajara

Population (2004)
  - Total: 1,916
- Time zone: UTC+3 (AST)

Jamla (Arabic: جملة, also spelled Gamlah, Jumlah, Jamleh or Al Jamlah) is a village in southwestern Syria, administratively part of the Daraa Governorate and immediately east of the Israeli-occupied Golan Heights. It is situated on the eastern slopes of the Wadi Ruqqad valley. Nearby localities include Abdin to the south, the nahiyah ("subdistrict") center of al-Shajara to the southwest, Nafia to the east, Ayn Zakar to the northeast and Saida to the north. According to the Syria Central Bureau of Statistics (CBS), Jamla had a population of 1,916 in the 2004 census. Its inhabitants are predominantly Sunni Muslims.

== History ==
Large stone ruins in the vicinity, including a rectangular-shaped building, attest to the antiquity of the site. The area features basaltic mounds called rujm, some of which rise to an elevation of 24–30 feet. Atop the rujm are circles and squares up to 10 feet wide carved into the basaltic rock.

Near Jamla, in the Ruqqad riverbed, lies the archaeological site of Tel ed-Dra', where a fragment depicting a winged deity, possibly Victoria, was discovered in the early 20th century. Previously, the site was mistakenly identified as the location of the ancient Jewish town of Gamla, known for its siege during the First Jewish–Roman War, due to the similarity in name. This identification was later refuted when Gamla's true location was discovered elsewhere.

=== Ottoman period ===
In the Ottoman tax registers of 1596, Jamla was located in the nahiya of Jawlan Sarqi, Qada of Hawran. It had a population of 7 households and 3 bachelors, all Muslims. They paid a fixed tax-rate of 25% on agricultural products, including wheat, barley, summer crops, goats and beehives, in addition to occasional revenues; a total of 2,700 akçes.

In the late 19th-century Jamla was described by Gottlieb Schumacher as an impoverished village of 36 hut-like houses and a population of 160 Muslims. Arable land was relatively scarce, although there was significant pasture areas to the south. Figs and vegetables were cultivated by the residents in fields to the north and the southwest. There was an abundant supply of water deriving from the Ain Hamatah spring which fed a stream that flowed around the village and irrigated its crops. The residents owned the property of Tahunat Jamla, a small mill turned by the Wadi Seisun waterfall.

=== Civil war ===
In March 2013, during the Syrian civil war, the Yarmouk Martyrs Brigade kidnapped 21 Filipino United Nations peacekeepers patrolling the ceasefire line between Syria and the Israeli-occupied Golan Heights. The Brigade was reportedly in control of the village itself, but intense clashes were occurring around it. The peacekeepers were accused of cooperating with the Syrian authorities. The rebels demanded that the Syrian Army withdraw from the vicinity of Jamla in return for their release. They were freed after several days.

The town remained under the control of the Brigade. On 15 November 2015, the head of the brigade, Muhammad "Abu Ali" al-Baridi and five others, were killed in a bomb blast in Jamla; Al-Nusra Front claimed responsibility for the attack. The Brigade merged with the ISIL-affiliated Khalid ibn al-Walid Army, and maintained control of the city through 2016 and 2017.

On 28 July 2018, the Syrian army recaptured Jamla.

On 21 June 2022, two Syrian soldiers were killed by an IED explosion on a road near the village.

=== 2024 invasion by Israel ===
In December 2024, during the 2024 Israeli invasion of Syria, the IDF occupied Jamla and Ma'ariya, and opened fire on Syrian protesters.

== Bibliography ==
- Hütteroth, W.-D.; Abdulfattah, K. (1977). Historical Geography of Palestine, Transjordan and Southern Syria in the Late 16th Century. Erlanger Geographische Arbeiten, Sonderband 5. Erlangen, Germany: Vorstand der Fränkischen Geographischen Gesellschaft. ISBN 3-920405-41-2.
- Schumacher, G.; Oliphant, L.; le Strange, G. (1889). Across the Jordan: being an exploration and survey of part of Hauran and Jaulan. Bentley.
