= Jalin =

Jalin جلين
- Village
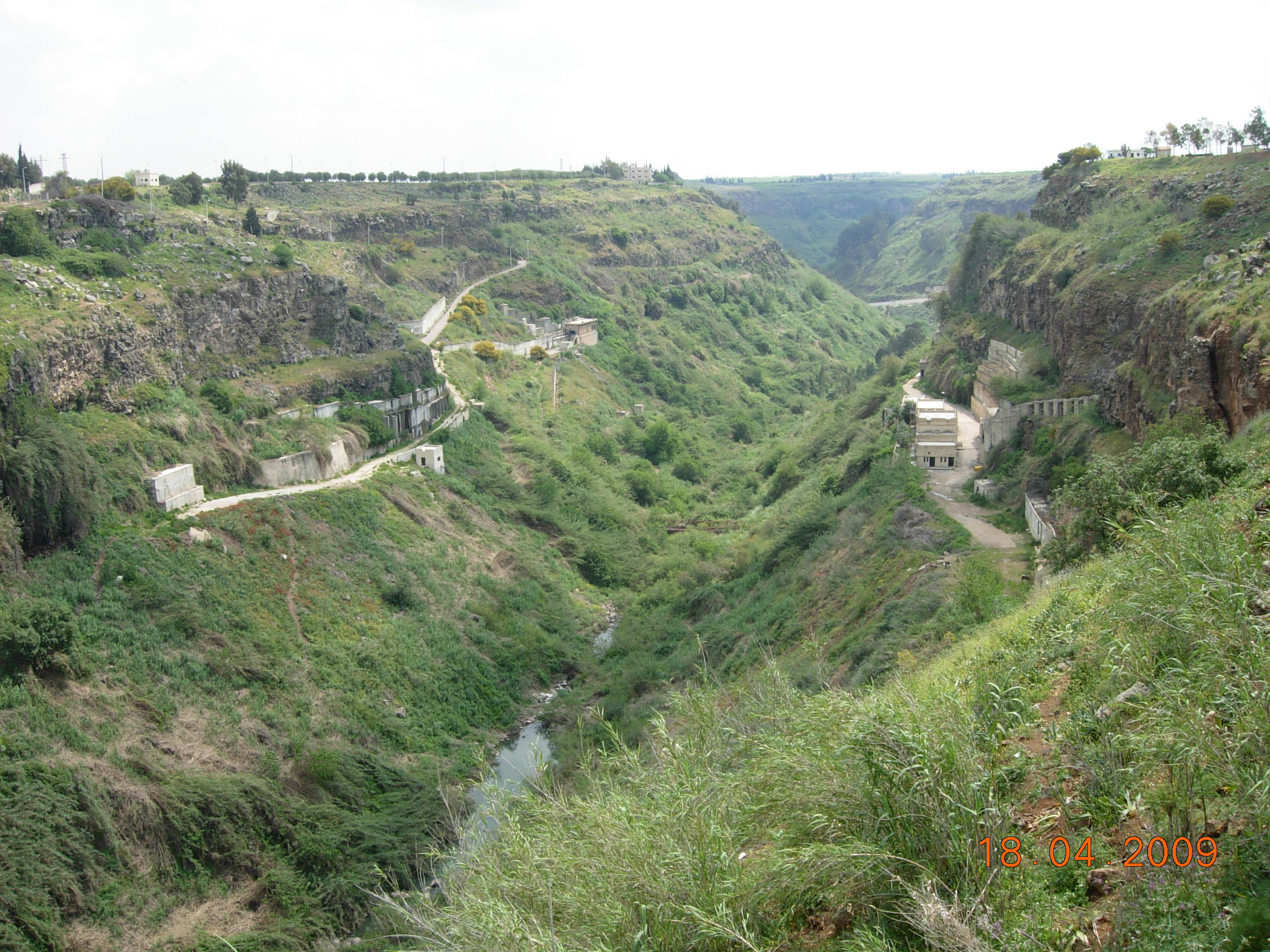
- Wadi Al-Hareer - Jallin

- Location within Syria
- Coordinates: 32°45′16″N 35°59′23″E
- PAL: 243/239
- Country: Syria
- Governorate: Daraa Governorate
- District: Daraa District
- Nahiyah: Tafas

Population (2004)
  - Total: 4,337
- Time zone: UTC+3 (AST)

Jalin (Arabic: جلين, also spelled Jileen or Jillin) is a village in southern Syria, administratively part of the Daraa Governorate, located northwest of Daraa. Nearby localities include Muzayrib to the southeast, Tafas to the east, al-Shaykh Saad to the northeast, Adwan to the north, Tasil to the northwest and Saham al-Jawlan and Hit to the west. According to the Syria Central Bureau of Statistics, Jalin had a population of 4,337 in the 2004 census.

== History ==
In some sources relating the Arab conquest of Syria, it is mentioned that the last army the Byzantine Empire set up in the region took up position near Jalin before the crucial Battle of the Yarmuk in 635. The battle took place west of Jalin and led to the catastrophic defeat of the Byzantine army.

=== Ottoman period ===
According to the mayor of Jalin, Ahmad Hassan Imran, Jalin was originally founded during the Egyptian administration of Ibrahim Pasha (1832–1841). By 1884, it was described as an impoverished village of 20 hut-like houses built either of mudbrick or stone. Its population consisted of 100 black Africans hailing from the Sudan. They were settled in two villages, Jalin and al-Shaykh Saad to the north, by Sheikh Saad ibn Abd al-Qadir, himself from the Sudan. The Africans initially came as slaves of the sheikh, but were later freed. They gradually settled in other parts of the Hauran region of southern Syria. At Jalin, the inhabitants cultivated grapes and vegetables in nearby vineyards and gardens.

=== Post-independent Syria ===
In 1963 the village began to expand northward, the new homes built of cement, in contrast to the older stone and mud village along the Hit valley. Jalin's population increased significantly in the mid-20th century with families moving there from the Beisan Valley, the Syrian steppe and the Butayha area of the Golan Heights.

== Bibliography ==
- Schumacher, Gottlieb; Oliphant, Laurence; le Strange, Guy (1886). Across the Jordan: being an exploration and survey of part of Hauran and Jaulan. Bentley.
