= Tasil =

Tasil تسيل Tsil
- Town
- Location within Syria
- Coordinates: 32°50′7″N 35°58′17″E
- Grid position: 241/249 PAL
- Country: Syria
- Governorate: Daraa
- District: Izraa
- Subdistrict: Tasil
- Elevation: 525 m (1,722 ft)

Population (2004)
  - Total: 15,985
- Time zone: UTC+2 (EET)
  - Summer (DST): UTC+3 (EEST)

Tasil (Arabic: تسيل, also spelled Tsil) is a town in southern Syria, administratively part of the Izraa District in the Daraa Governorate. Nearby localities include Nawa to the northeast, Adawan and ash-Shaykh Saad to the east, Jalin and Tafas to the south, Saham al-Jawlan to the southwest and Saida and the Golan Heights to the west. According to the Syria Central Bureau of Statistics, Tasil had a population of 15,985 in the 2004 census. It is the administrative center of a nahiyah ("subdistrict") consisting of three localities with a combined population of 17,778 in the 2004 census. Its inhabitants are predominantly Sunni Muslims.

It is situated on an elevation of 1,722 feet (525 meters) above sea level surrounded by extensive tracts of arable, but stony land.

== History ==
=== Antiquity ===
Ancient remains in Tasil indicate that a temple dedicated to one of the Roman emperors Constantine the Great or Constantius II and dated to the early 4th-century CE was located in the village. Tasil might be the "Tharsila on the Batanea" listed by Eusebius as inhabited by Samaritans, though no other literary or archaeological evidence for a Samaritan past is known.

Tasil was one of the first regions conquered by the Rashiduns after a battle between the Byzantine and Muslim Arab armies in the Hauran during the Muslim conquest of Syria in the early-mid 7th-century.

=== Ottoman period ===
In 1596, Tasil appeared in Ottoman tax registers as a village in the Nahiya of Jawlan Sargi in the Qada of Hawran. It had a population of 37 Muslim households and 25 bachelors. They paid a fixed tax-rate of 25% on wheat, barley, summer crops, goats or beehives, and a water mill; a total of 4,500 akçe.

In the late 19th-century Tasil was a large village with about 90 houses constructed from stone and mud brick. The population was about 300, all Muslims. Its main source of water was natural pool, consisting of 50 square yards, called al-Birkeh ("the Pool") situated to the north. In dry seasons village residents had to travel to the Nahr al-Allan spring. Most of the archaeological fragments of Tasil were built into the village's houses and mosques, many of them hidden by the plaster. There was a local superstition among Tasil's inhabitants that any resident who removed and gave travelers stones from the village's structures would be punished by God either by death or another misfortune.

=== Modern era ===
Israeli paratroopers landed in Tasil on 10 June 1953 according to Syrian officials at the time.

A eponymous dam was constructed near the village in the late 1970s.

==== Civil War ====
During the civil war, Tasil came under the influence of rebel Free Syrian Army forces. In February 2017, an isolated pocket of Islamic State-affiliated forces captured the town from rebel forces during the Southwestern Daraa offensive (February 2017) On 27 July 2018, the Syrian army recaptured Tasil from ISIL.

On 3 June 2025, two rockets were launched from the vicinity of Tasil. They landed in open areas within the Israeli-controlled Golan Heights, causing no reported casualties or damage. A group identifying itself as the "Martyr Muhammad al-Deif Brigades" claimed responsibility for the rocket fire via social media. However, this claim remains unverified. The Martyr Muhammad al-Deif Brigades is a newly emerged and little-known militant group, named after Mohammed Deif, the former military commander of Hamas's Izz al-Din al-Qassam Brigades, who was killed in an Israeli airstrike in July 2024 during the Gaza conflict. Despite the name, Hamas has denied any affiliation with the group, stating it has no knowledge of its formation, leadership, or backing.

== Archaeology ==
Two notable ancient structures were located in Tasil, near the residence of the sheikh ("local chief.") They stood adjacent to each other and were known as "Jama'ah" and "Medany." The Jama'ah served as a mosque with an interior area of 53 x 40 feet and a roof supported by four square pillars. While the mosque appears to be of Islamic construction, it was possibly built on the site of an ancient synagogue or church. It had a courtyard to its east that measured 53 x 37 feet and was enclosed by basalt walls. In the southwestern corner of the mosque stood the ruined Medany tower which had a height of 20 feet and was supported by three columns.

In the fields west of Tsil lay numerous dolmens, although most of them are collapsed or ruined.

== Religious buildings ==
- Al-Omari/Al-Umari Mosque (Stone Mosque, Old Mosque)
- Omar ibn al-Khattab Mosque
- Abu Ayyub al-Ansari Mosque
- Ali ibn Abi Talib Mosque

== Bibliography ==
- Hütteroth, W.-D.; Abdulfattah, K. (1977). Historical Geography of Palestine, Transjordan and Southern Syria in the Late 16th Century. Erlanger Geographische Arbeiten, Sonderband 5. Erlangen, Germany: Vorstand der Fränkischen Geographischen Gesellschaft. ISBN 3-920405-41-2.
- Moralee, Jason (2004). "For Salvation's Sake": Provincial Loyalty, Personal Religion, and Epigraphic Production in the Roman and Late Antique Near East. Psychology Press. ISBN 0415967783.
- O'Shea, Stephen (2007). Sea of Faith: Islam and Christianity in the Medieval Mediterranean World. Bloomsbury Publishing USA. ISBN 978-0802715173.
- Schumacher, G.; Oliphant, L.; le Strange, G. (1889). Across the Jordan: being an exploration and survey of part of Hauran and Jaulan. Bentley.
