= Nafia =

Nafia نافعة
- Village
- Location within Syria
- Coordinates: 32°48′32″N 35°53′34″E
- Grid position: 234/246 PAL
- Country: Syria
- Governorate: Daraa
- District: Daraa
- Subdistrict: Shajara

Population (2004 census)
  - Total: 2,673
- Time zone: UTC+3 (AST)

Nafia (Arabic: نافعة, romanized: Nāfiʾa, also transliterated Nafi'ya) is a village in southern Syria, administratively part of the Daraa Governorate, located west of Daraa. According to the Syria Central Bureau of Statistics, Nafia had a population of 2,673 in the 2004 census.

== History ==
In 1884 American archaeologist Gottlieb Schumacher described Nafia as a village of about 160 Muslims living in thirty-five huts made of stone and mud. The village was situated at an elevation slightly above its surroundings in the stony country east of the Jawlan (Golan Heights). Its soil was of high quality and its cultivable lands extended eastward to the Nahr al-Allan river. Schumacher surmised the village had been of greater importance in its past, due to the considerable ruins of ancient and more modern dwellings in its immediate vicinity.

== Bibliography ==
- Schumacher, Gottlieb (1886). Across the Jordan: Being an Exploration and Survey of part of Hauran and Jaulan. London: Richard Bentley and Son.
