= Muhammad al-Baridi =

- Born: Muhammad al-Baridi; 1970; Jamla, Daraa Governorate, Syria
- Died: 15 November 2015 (aged 44–45); Jamla, Daraa Governorate, Syria
- Military career
- Allegiance: Yarmouk Martyrs Brigade
- Service years: 2012 August - 15 November 2015
- Nicknames: Abu Ali al-Baridi, al-Khal
- Conflicts: Syrian Civil War

Muhammad al-Baridi (1970 – 15 November 2015), known as Abu Ali al-Baridi and Al-Khal, was a rebel leader during the Syrian Civil War. He founded the Yarmouk Martyrs Brigade, which became connected to the Islamic State under his leadership and which he led until his death.

== Biography ==
Muhammad al-Baridi was born in 1970 in the village of Jamla, Daraa Governorate, Syria. He was born into the prominent Baridi family/clan that is local to the Yarmouk Valley. His father was a well-known and wealthy landowner working in agriculture and his son followed in his father's footsteps from the beginning of his working life. Muhammad then moved into selling produce in the Deraa markets while not abandoning agricultural work. He studied Arabic language for a time at Damascus University, though he does not appear to have graduated with a degree.

=== Ideology ===
The group he led, the Yarmouk Martyrs Brigade, originally had a nationalist orientation, working in cooperation with Syrian rebel groups. It later switched its orientation to an Islamist one, and it is believed that Muhammad held radical views for many years prior to the outbreak of the Syrian Civil War.

=== Imprisonment ===
At some point he was imprisoned by the Syrian government of Bashar al-Assad. The charges he was subject to are in dispute, with claims that he was imprisoned on account of thefts of antiquities from archaeological sites and other claims that it was on account of 'extremist' tendencies.

Two men speaking to Aymenn Jawad Al-Tamimi, an expert in the dynamics of the war in Southern Syria, assert that he had been imprisoned by the regime twice before the revolution- each time for less than a year. It is said that Muhammad al-Baridi desired the implementation of Islamic law before the revolution. Another sources says he was imprisoned because "he was interested in extremist thought" and had been released after the beginning of the revolution as part of the "second amnesty" issued by the regime for a number of political prisoners over some months in 2011. On this reading it is likely he was imprisoned in Sednaya Prison. It is said that he wished to go to Iraq but could not because the Syrian mukhabarat caught up with him.

=== Death ===
He was assassinated 15 November 2015, alongside several other members of his top leadership in his hometown of Jamla in a suicide attack carried out by Jabhat al-Nusra.
