= Pigah =

River in Israel

Pigah was one of the four legendary rivers that encompassed Ancient Israel, the other three of which are Yarden, Kidomiyon and Yarmoch, and which are probably tributaries of the River Jordan.

The waters of the Pigah are a pond, and thus were considered ritually unclean. Another translation asserts that the waters are "muddy" and thus not suitable, or "not fit (to sprinkle the unclean) ...."

It is not clear to which modern wadi or stream this refers.
