= Kidomiyon =

Kidomiyon, also Kirmion and the Keramyon, was one of the four rivers of Ancient Israel.

The others were Yarden, Yarmoch and Pigah, probably tributaries of the River Jordan. It is also known in French as le Kirmion, and in Latin as Kirmion
