= Southwestern Daraa offensive (February 2017) =

Military operation

- Part of the Daraa Governorate campaign and the Opposition–Islamic State conflict of the Syrian Civil War
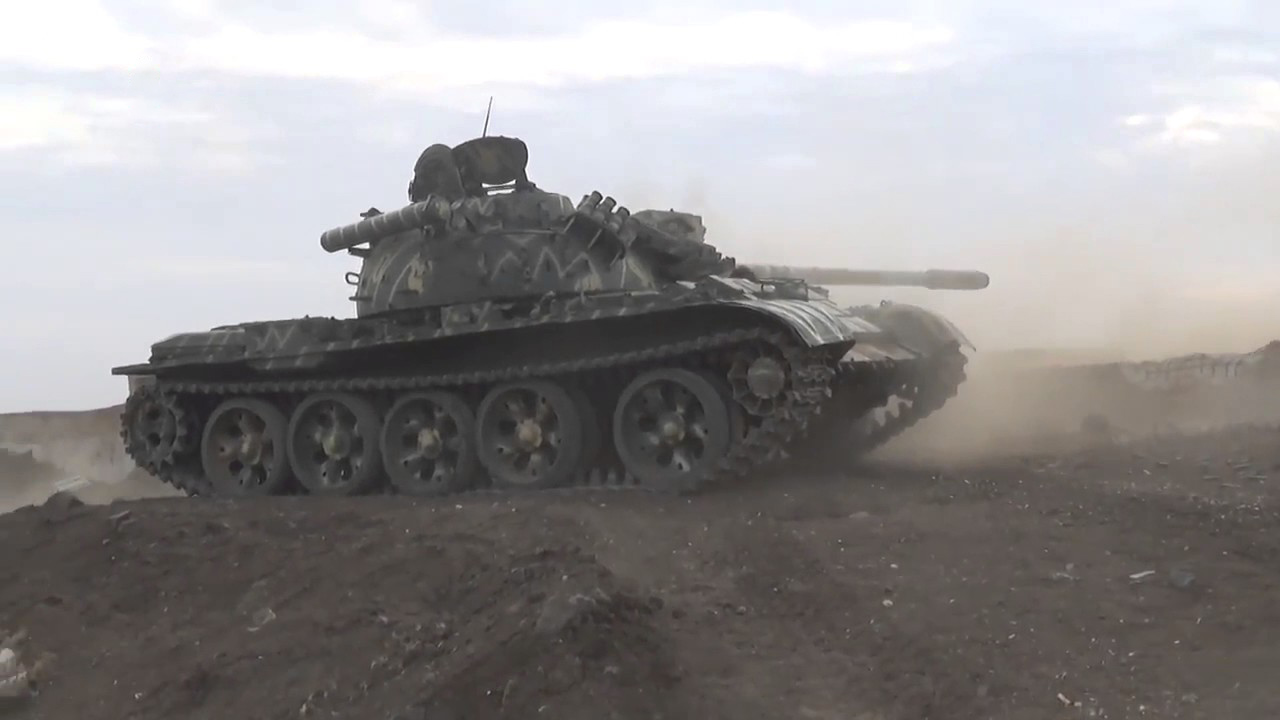
- A Free Syrian Army T-55 during the battles against ISIL west of Daraa. Map of the offensive within the wider context of South-western Syria. The simultaneously rebel offensive in Daraa city is marked with a hatched box.
| Date | 20–27 February 2017 (1 week) |
| Location | Southwestern Daraa Governorate, Syria |
| Result | ISIL victory: ISIL captured Tasil, four other towns and villages, two bases and two hills; Rebels recaptured two villages |

Belligerents
| Islamic State | Southern Front; Hay'at Tahrir al-Sham |

Units involved
| Khalid ibn al-Walid Army | Unknown |

Strength
| 1,100–1,500+ | Several hundred |

Casualties and losses
| 36 killed | 174 killed, dozens missing |
- 9 civilians killed

The Southwestern Daraa offensive (February 2017) was launched by an Islamic State affiliate, the Khalid ibn al-Walid Army, in the southwest of Syria near the Golan Heights and on the border with Israel and Jordan.

== The offensive ==
In preparation for the offensive, the ISIL affiliate was secretly supplied with intelligence and ammunition by members of three rebel factions in exchange for money. Recruited ISIL supporters, which included municipal employees, women and children as young as 12, had also helped to smuggle weapons and materiel into the besieged ISIL enclave.

On 20 February 2017, the Khalid ibn al-Walid Army took advantage of the rebel's redirection of personnel for an offensive in Daraa city and launched their large-scale offensive which resulted in them capturing Tasil, as well as four other towns and villages and a hill. The rebels managed to recapture only two towns.

The offensive started a few hours after midnight on 19 February, when the Khalid ibn al-Walid Army hacked into FSA communications and, posing as FSA commanders, announced that rebel lines had been breached in three towns, including Tasil. They told rebel units to retreat because ISIL had already captured the villages. At the same time, ISIL sympathisers in rebel-held territory took control of the public address systems on village mosques and announced that ISIL was in control, while members of ISIL sleeper cells, which didn't number more than 10 per each village, attacked the rebels from behind and created the impression that the breach of rebel lines had indeed taken place. This led to the withdrawal of most rebel forces. The hill that was captured, was the strategic hilltop of Tal Al-Jamou that overlooks Tasil. It had 15 rebel posts, each manned by two or three fighters. ISIL forces advanced through the posts, killing rebels who were too slow to flee.

On 22 February, ISIL forces captured three more areas, including a former Army base. By this point, since the start of the offensive, 132 people had been killed in the fighting, mostly combatants. The dead included some captured rebels that were beheaded. Three days later, ISIL seized two more villages. With this advance, ISIL had almost doubled the size of its territory in the area since the start of the offensive.

On 27 February, the rebels recaptured two villages and it was initially reported they also retook the hilltop of Tal Al-Jamou. However, the rebel attack on the ISIL-held hill was repelled following an ISIL ambush of rebel forces that left 31 rebel fighters dead.

== Aftermath ==
At the end of February 2017, rebels from 16 different FSA-affiliated factions formed the Nawa Operations Room in an attempt to quell the Khalid ibn al-Walid Army’s advances. On 7 March, a new rebel attack which attempted to recapture two villages from ISIL was reportedly repelled, with ISIL's Amaq News Agency reporting 19 rebel fighters were killed. On 19 March, according to ISIS, Southern Front and Tahrir al-Sham tried to storm the two villages again but their attack failed with Jaysh Khaled bin Walid remaining in control of the villages.

On 15 April, another rebel assault was reportedly thwarted by Jaysh Khalid ibn al-Walid between the towns of Tasil and Tafas, killing 17 rebel fighters and injuring 30 more. Fighting continued into 17 April, with rebels being ambushed and, according to ISIS' Amaq News Agency, sustaining heavy casualties with 25 being killed and 27 injured.

On 8 May, the Khalid ibn al-Walid Army repelled a fierce Southern Front assault which included heavy weaponry and tanks, which resulted in 17 Southern Front fighters being killed and 15 more injured. On 15 May, Jaysh Khalid Ibn al-Walid fended off another offensive by Southern Front, apparently resulting in several of Southern Front fighters' decapitation, according to images circulated by ISIL.

On 11 June, fighting erupted between factions of Southern Front amid fears of defections to the Khalid ibn al-Walid Army in towns of Inkhil and Maaraba and the Nasib Border Crossing. Syrian military sources reported that around 200 Southern Front fighters defected to the ISIL-aligned group during last year. 15 June saw yet another attempt to break through defense lines of Jaysh Khalid Ibn al-Walid by the Southern Front via Adwan hill and yet again the attempt was foiled, resulting in two Southern Front militants being killed, according to local ISIL media.

On 7 September, ISIL-aligned fighters of Saifullah al-Maslul stormed al-Abdali and al-Majahid, resulting in the immediate capture of both. However, Southern Front regrouped and recaptured the villages before dawn of 8 September at the expense of 6 of their militants killed and 1 captured by the ISIL-linked group.

In the early hours of 18 April 2018, the Khalid ibn al-Walid Army launched another offensive against rebels in Saham al-Jawlan and other villages in the area. After a day of fighting, the rebels recaptured the villages lost in the attack, and more than 40 fighters on both sides were killed.

== See also ==
- Daraa Governorate campaign
- List of wars and battles involving ISIL
- Battle of Kirkuk (2016)
