= Hit, Daraa Governorate =

Hit حيط Heit, Hayt
- Village
- Location within Syria
- Coordinates: 32°45′15″N 35°54′44″E
- Grid position: 235/239 PAL
- Country: Syria
- Governorate: Daraa
- District: Daraa
- Subdistrict: Shajara

Population (2004 census)
  - Total: 3,956
- Time zone: UTC+3 (AST)

Hit (حيط; also transliterated Heit or Hayt) is a village in southern Syria, administratively part of the Daraa Governorate. According to the Syrian Central Bureau of Statistics, it had a population of 3,956 in the 2004 census. The village sits by the confluence of the Allan and Ehreir streams, overlooking the deep gorge where the streams meet. It is near the approaches to the Yarmuk river, which represents the border between Syria and Jordan.

== History ==
=== Ottoman period ===
In 1596 Hit appeared in the Ottoman tax registers as part of the nahiya (subdistrict) of Jawlan Sharqi in the Qada of Hauran. It had an all Muslim population consisting of 20 households and 15 bachelors. A fixed tax−rate of 25% was paid on wheat (6,000 akçe), barley (2,250 a.), summer crops (750 a.), goats and/or beehives (1,000), in addition to taxes on a water mill (120 a.) and occasional revenues (880 a.); a total of 11,000 akçe.

In 1886, Gottlieb Schumacher noted that Hit was a medium-sized village of 150 Muslims living in thirty huts, part of which were constructed of stone and others mud, with the largest and best-built being that of its sheikh (headman). The modern village had been established in the preceding few years by families from the nearby village of Saham al-Jawlan who lost their properties to their creditors and made use of Hit's scattered ancient ruins to build their new settlement.

== Bibliography ==
- Hütteroth, W.-D.; Abdulfattah, K. (1977). Historical Geography of Palestine, Transjordan and Southern Syria in the Late 16th Century. Erlanger Geographische Arbeiten, Sonderband 5. Erlangen, Germany: Vorstand der Fränkischen Geographischen Gesellschaft. ISBN 3-920405-41-2.
- Schumacher, Gottlieb (1886). Across the Jordan: Being an Exploration and Survey of Part of Hauran and Jaulan. London: Richard Bentley and Son.
