= 2013 Daraa offensive =

Military operation in Syria

- Part of the Syrian civil war
- Situation in Daraa governorate, mid-June 2013
Date	3 March – 10 April 2013 (1 month and 1 week)
Location	Daraa Governorate, Syria
Result	Partial rebel victory: Rebels take control of several towns and villages along the border, as well as five Army bases; Syrian army launches a counter-attack retaking two towns

Belligerents
(Syrian opposition) Free Syrian Army; Al-Nusra Front	(Syria) Syrian Arab Republic

Commanders and leaders
Ltc. Yasser al-Abboud †	Gen. Mohsin Makhlouf; Col. Saleh Nejdah

Units involved
(Syrian opposition) Free Syrian Army; (Syrian opposition) Daraa Military Council; Fajr al-Islam Brigade; (Syrian opposition) Yarmouk Martyrs Brigade; Suqour Houran Brigade; Fallujah-Houran brigade	Syrian Armed Forces; Syrian Arab Army; 5th Armoured Division; 15th Armoured Brigade; 61st Army Regiment; 4th Armoured Division; 555th SF (Airborne) Regiment; Syrian Air Force; Security Agencies; (Syria) Shabiha

Casualties and losses
40 killed	10 killed
- 29 civilians killed

The 2013 Daraa offensive was a campaign during the Syrian Civil War launched by the FSA in the Daraa Governorate to capture the strategic border area. The offensive began in early March 2013. During the campaign, rebel forces captured several bases and towns. The offensive was eventually halted following an Army counter-offensive in mid-April, which resulted in the recapture of a few towns and villages. After that, the rebels continued their advance by launching a counter-offensive of their own.

== Background ==
In early 2013, rebels in southern Syria started receiving an influx of foreign-funded weapons over the border from Jordan. This gave them a new momentum, with the rebels preparing an offensive to capture the strategically important region along the border with Jordan that would give them a critical gateway to attempt an attack on the capital, Damascus.

== Offensive ==
=== Rebel attack ===
Situation in Daraa, mid-March 2013

On 3 March, rebels seized an artillery battalion in Jalma village near the Israeli Armistice line. Eight rebels were killed in the fighting, and SOHR stated that the rebels summarily executed the battalion commander.

On 23 March, several rebel groups captured the 38th air defense division base of the Syrian Army in near a strategic highway linking Damascus to Jordan, and killed the base commander, General Mahmoud Darwish.

On the next day, rebels captured a 25 km strip of land near the Jordanian border, which included the towns of Muzrib, Abdin, and the al-Rai military checkpoint.

On 29 March, rebels seized control of the strategic town of Da'el, located 10 miles from the Jordanian border, after days of fierce fighting which left 38 people dead, including 16 rebels.

On 3 April, rebels captured the air defense base of the 49th battalion of the Syrian Army in the town of Alma in the northern outskirts of Daraa.

On 5 April, rebels captured an Army garrison defending the main border crossing into Jordan, after a week-long siege in which dozens were reportedly killed.

=== Government counter-attack ===
On 10 April, the Syrian Army launched a counter-attack on the town of Sanamein and Ghabaghib, seizing control of Sanamein. Syrian state TV reported that the Army launched operations against Tafas, Dael and Jasim as well. 54 people were killed during the fighting in Sanamein: 29 civilians, 16 rebels, 9 soldiers and three defectors.

== Aftermath ==
=== Reopening of Army supply line and stalemate ===
On 8 May, government forces captured the strategic town of Khirbet Ghazaleh, situated along the M5 motorway that leads to the Jordanian border. Over 1,000 rebel fighters withdrew from the town due to the lack of reinforcements and ammunition. The loss of the town also resulted in the reopening of the government supply-route to the contested city of Daraa. The rebels continued to withdraw from other towns and decided not to face the Army's advance along the highway because they no longer had ammunition. However, later in the day, an opposition commander claimed that the retreat was part of a rebel plan to set up a trap for government forces and that the opposition fighters managed to recapture the town. Still, this was denied by the opposition group SOHR which stated that the rebels had managed only to recapture one neighbourhood and fighting was still ongoing in the town.

On 12 May, government forces took complete control of Khirbet Ghazaleh and secured the highway near the town.

By early June, according to Jordanian border guards and militias, the rebels were conducting primitive attacks against Syrian Army positions on the other side of the border. The Syrian military was edging closer towards the border and their success against the rebels was credited to the recent arrival of more improved gear and vehicles, not seen before, for the Syrian Army. These include drones, anti-mortar systems and communications jamming devices. The anti-mortar systems deployed in some areas allow the Syrian military to trace the source of mortar fire and even strike before the rebels launch an attack.

In late June, rebel forces were in fear of being routed by the Army in southern Syria and losing control of their safe zones on the Jordanian border. By 26 June, government forces had captured the villages of Itlaa and Basr As Sham and fighting was raging outside the village of Ash-Shaykh Miskin.

=== Slow rebel advances ===
Situation in Daraa city, mid-October 2013

On 28 June, rebels, including units of Al-Nusra Front, took control of the strategically important Binayat checkpoint in Daraa city. They also occupied the area around the Omari mosque in the southern part of the city, which was a focal point of the initial protests in March 2011.

On 8 August, Ahmad Jarba, president of the Western-backed Syrian National Coalition, crossed from Jordan into rebel-held territory in Daraa Province to meet with refugees and observe Eid al-Fitr. He was accompanied by Ahmad Nima, leader of the FSA Daraa Military Council.

On 28 September, rebels including groups linked to Al Qaeda seized the Ramtha border crossing on the Syria-Jordan border after days of fighting which left 26 soldiers dead along with 7 foreign rebel fighters. On 9 October, rebels also seized the Hajanar border crossing on the Jordanian border near Daraa after a month of fierce fighting. Its fall meant rebels were now in control of a swath of territory along the border from outside of Daraa to the edge of Golan Heights.

On 21 October, FSA chief Yasser Abbud (aka Abu Ammar), leader of the Fallujah-Houran brigade was killed during fighting with the army in Tafas. He was once the commander of the military council of the FSA.

On 2 December, Islamist rebels managed to capture an armament battalion base near the town of Buser al-Harir, several soldiers were captured during the attack. One month later, rebels claimed to have taken control of the hospital in the town of Jasim, where government forces had previously been based.

== See also ==
- Daraa Governorate campaign
