= Yarmouk Martyrs Brigade =

Rebel group in Syria

- لواء شهداء اليرموك; Liwa Shuhada al-Yarmouk
- Official logo of the Yarmouk Martyrs Brigade Brigade Flag
- Leaders: Abu Abdullah al-Madani (5 March–21 May 2016); Abu Obeida Qahtan (15 November 2015–5 March 2016); Muhammad al-Baridi † (2012–15 November 2015)
- Dates active: August 2012 – 21 May 2016
- Headquarters: Jamla
- Ideology: Sunni Islamism; Islamic Statism (from 2014)
- Size: ~600–1,000
- Part of: Free Syrian Army (2012-2015): Southern Front (2014-2015); Islamic State (allegedly, 2015-)
- Wars: the Syrian Civil War

The Yarmouk Martyrs Brigade (Arabic: لواء شهداء اليرموك) was a rebel group in southern Syria during the Syrian Civil War. For part of its existence it was connected to the Islamic State. It fought against several Syrian Opposition groups for dominance in the Yarmouk Basin. On 21 May 2016, it merged with other Islamist groups into the Khalid ibn al-Walid Army.

== History ==
=== Cooperation with other rebels ===
The Yarmouk Martyrs Brigade was originally set up in 2012, largely based on "local and familial ties, rather than ideology". At this stage connected to mainstream Syrian rebel bodies like the Supreme Military Council and Southern Front, the brigade became increasingly isolated from other groups, owing to accusations that it was affiliated with the Islamic State (IS).

The group gained attention when it abducted 21 Filipino UN soldiers in early March 2013, releasing them on 10 March 2013. The group justified the kidnapping by claiming that "UN is silent about the crimes of the regime against the Syrian people" and that it provided "aid to the criminal regime forces". After much criticism, however, the brigade changed its position, saying that it had attempted to protect the UN peacekeepers from the "barbaric bombing that Assad’s criminal gangs are launching against the western villages of Deraa province and all of Syria."

At this time, the Yarmouk Martyrs Brigade still cooperated with other rebel groups in the war against the government: In course of the 2013 Daraa offensive, the brigade aided the al-Nusra Front in attacking the 38th Division air defence base, and fought with other opposition groups during the capture of several towns south of Nawa. It also participated in a major, yet eventually unsuccessful offensive to capture Nawa itself from the government in July 2013. It continued to work together with other rebel groups throughout early 2014, stating at the time that its aim was to "fight so that Syrian men and women may choose a free and democratic system that establishes a prosperous state respecting the aspirations of Syrians in the freedom and dignity for which they have fought." By July 2014, the brigade began to clash with other rebel groups such as the Islamic Muthanna Movement, first expressing some kind of affinity to the Islamic State and adopted more Islamic symbols and insignia. Nevertheless, the groups officially remained part of the Southern Front and took part in the First Battle of Al-Shaykh Maskin.

=== Allegiance to ISIL ===
In 2014, the Yarmouk Martyrs Brigade began facing accusations made by al-Nusra that the group was an affiliate of ISIL due to a series of reforms made by the group earlier in the year, such as the group changing the flag in its logo to the flag of ISIL and adopting an administrative model similar to that of ISIL. The first claims of the group's affiliation with ISIL did not occur until December 2014, with al-Nusra launching an offensive against the group in response, other groups allied with al-Nusra later joined in on the offensive against the Yarmouk Martyrs Brigade confining the group to the towns of Jamla and Shajara. The fighting ended after mediation between al-Nusra and the Yarmouk Martyr's Brigades by the Islamic Muthanna Movement. The claims of allegiance and affiliation with ISIL made by al-Nusra regarding the Yarmouk Martyrs Brigade were denied by the Southern Front. However after the clashes with the group's affiliation became more widely known to locals, with one resident of town under the group's control claiming members the group liked the ideology of ISIL and there was a shift in the opinion of its members, the resident also quoted the members as saying "We want their [ISIL] course if they are truthful." However there were no conformations of the group's affiliation or support for ISIL. In an interview a member of the group stated regarding the claims of affiliation with ISIL, "With regards to whether there was a secret connection with respect to the leadership, this I don't know about." The member also added that the group was an Islamist group since its foundation.

The group also went on to establish an Islamic court with its own police force called the "Diwan of Hisbah" to enforce Islamic law modeled and named after ISIL's own Hisbah in territories they controlled. However there were differences in the approach taken by the Yarmouk Martyrs Brigade and ISIL in their enforcement of Sharia, with the Yarmouk Martyrs Brigade being described as taking a more gradual approach, such as how in areas under the control of ISIL it was obligatory and enforced for women to wear Niqabs in areas under the control of the Yarmouk Martyrs Brigade it was not enforced for Niqabs to be worn but was encouraged and Niqabs were distributed. Alongside establishing a Diwan of Hisbah the group also established a Diwan of Services based on ISIL's, which released photos also modeled after ISIL's style of photo releases depicting themes of common life in areas under their control, nature, and fighting.

The rebel Army of Conquest and Southern Front imposed a siege on the group's territory causing the prices of meat, fuel and water to increase.

In April and May 2015, the brigade, as well as Jaysh al-Jihad, launched attacks on al-Nusra. This fighting ended following arbitration from local groups.

On 15 November 2015, its head Muhammad "Abu Ali" al-Baridi, nicknamed al-Khal (the Uncle), and five other leaders were killed in a bomb blast in Jamla, the village where the Brigade is headquartered. Al-Nusra Front claimed responsibility for the attack. Abu Obaideh Qahtan, said to have been the effective leader of the brigade anyway, took over as head. Obaideh, a Palestinian-Syrian from the Yarmouk Camp, was not only a founding member of the brigade, but had also much military experience as veteran of the Soviet–Afghan War. Nevertheless, just four months after taking over, he was replaced as head by Abu Abdullah al-Madani, a previously unknown mujahid of Saudi origin. This development was both attributed to Obaideh's lacking administration skills and the strengthening links of the Yarmouk Martyrs Brigade with ISIL, as al-Madani was said to have been sent by the ISIL leadership to lead the brigade. Despite his replacement, Abu Obaideh Qahtan remained a major field commander of the brigade.

On 21 March 2016, the brigade and its ally, the Islamic Muthanna Movement, launched a major offensive against other rebel groups, aiming to take control of the Daraa Governorate. While the two groups were initially able to take control of several villages and towns, opposition forces eventually pushed them back. At least two important brigade commanders were killed during the conflict, among them Abu Tahrir, a Syria Revolutionaries Front defector.

As a result of the failed offensive, the Islamic Muthanna Movement and the Yarmouk Martyrs Brigade were severely weakened, leading to rumors they had merged. On 24 May 2016, they along with Jaysh al-Jihad officially united to form Khalid ibn al-Walid Army, or the Army of Khalid ibn al-Walid, a companion of the Prophet Muhammad.

== Designation as a terrorist organization ==
Country	Date	References
United States	9 June 2016	

== See also ==
- List of armed groups in the Syrian Civil War
