= Jaysh al-Jihad =

Jihadist group in Syria

- جيش الجهاد
- Logo of the group Flag used by the group
- Leader: Abu Mussab Al-Fanussy
- Dates active: February 2015 – 21 May 2016
- Headquarters: Al-Qahtaniyah, Quneitra
- Active regions: Quneitra Governorate and Daraa Governorate, Syria
- Ideology: Salafi Jihadism
- Size: 500
- Part of: Islamic State (allegedly)
- Wars: the Syrian Civil War

Jaysh al-Jihad (Jihad Army) was an Islamist rebel group based in Quneitra Governorate. The group formed from the merger of seven small independent groups and factions that defected from Nusra Front after it clashed with the Yarmouk Martyrs Brigade in December 2014. These groups were: Jihad Brigades, Jamaat Jund al-Islam, Jamaat Abu Baseer, Mujahideen of al-Sham movement, Jamaat Shabab Ahl al-Sunnah, Nurayn Brigade, and Jamaat Bunyan al-Marsous.

The group had been accused by other Syrian rebel groups of being affiliated with the Islamic State of Iraq and the Levant (ISIL). In April 2015, violent clashes broke out between the group and the Free Syrian Army and al-Nusra Front, after Jaish al-Jihad militants ambushed and killed six FSA fighters at a checkpoint in Quneitra. By 6 May 2015, Nusra and other rebel groups announced that they had cleared al-Qahtaniyah and Quneitra city of Jaysh al-Jihad forces.

In May 2016, remnants of Jaysh al-Jihad joined with two other Pro-ISIL factions in Southern Syria, the Yarmouk Martyrs Brigade and Islamic Muthanna Movement, to form the Khalid ibn al-Walid Army.

== See also ==
- List of armed groups in the Syrian Civil War
