= Ed-Dikke synagogue =

Ancient former synagogue in the Golan Heights, Syria

ed-Dikke synagogue
- Location of the ancient former synagogue in the Golan Heights

Religion
- Affiliation: Judaism (former)
- Ecclesiastical or organizational status: Ancient synagogue; Archaeological site
- Status: Ruins

Location
- Location: Golan Heights
- Country: Syria
- Interactive map of ed-Dikke synagogue
- Coordinates: 32°55′19″N 35°37′33″E

Architecture
- Completed: c. 460 CE
- Interior area: 11 by 14 metres (36 by 46 ft)

Site notes
- Excavation dates: 1905
- Archaeologists: Gottlieb Schumacher (1880s); Heinrich Kohl and Carl Watzinger (1905)

The ed-Dikke Synagogue is an ancient Jewish synagogue, located 3 km (1.9 mi) north of the Sea of Galilee on the eastern bank of the Jordan River in what are the Golan Heights, (Jaulan), Syria. The synagogue was completed in the c. 5th century CE.

== History ==
The synagogue, located at a site known as Khirbet ed-Dikke, was first identified by Gottlieb Schumacher in the 1880s. In 1905, Heinrich Kohl and Carl Watzinger briefly investigated the site.

The building is thought to date from c. 460 CE and consists of a prayer hall measuring approximately 11 by 14 m (36 by 46 ft). It was divided into three aisles by two rows of four columns each.

== See also ==
- Archaeology of Israel
- History of the Jews in Syria
- List of synagogues in Syria
