= Ash-Shaykh Saad =

Ash-Shaykh Saad الشيخ سعد
- Village
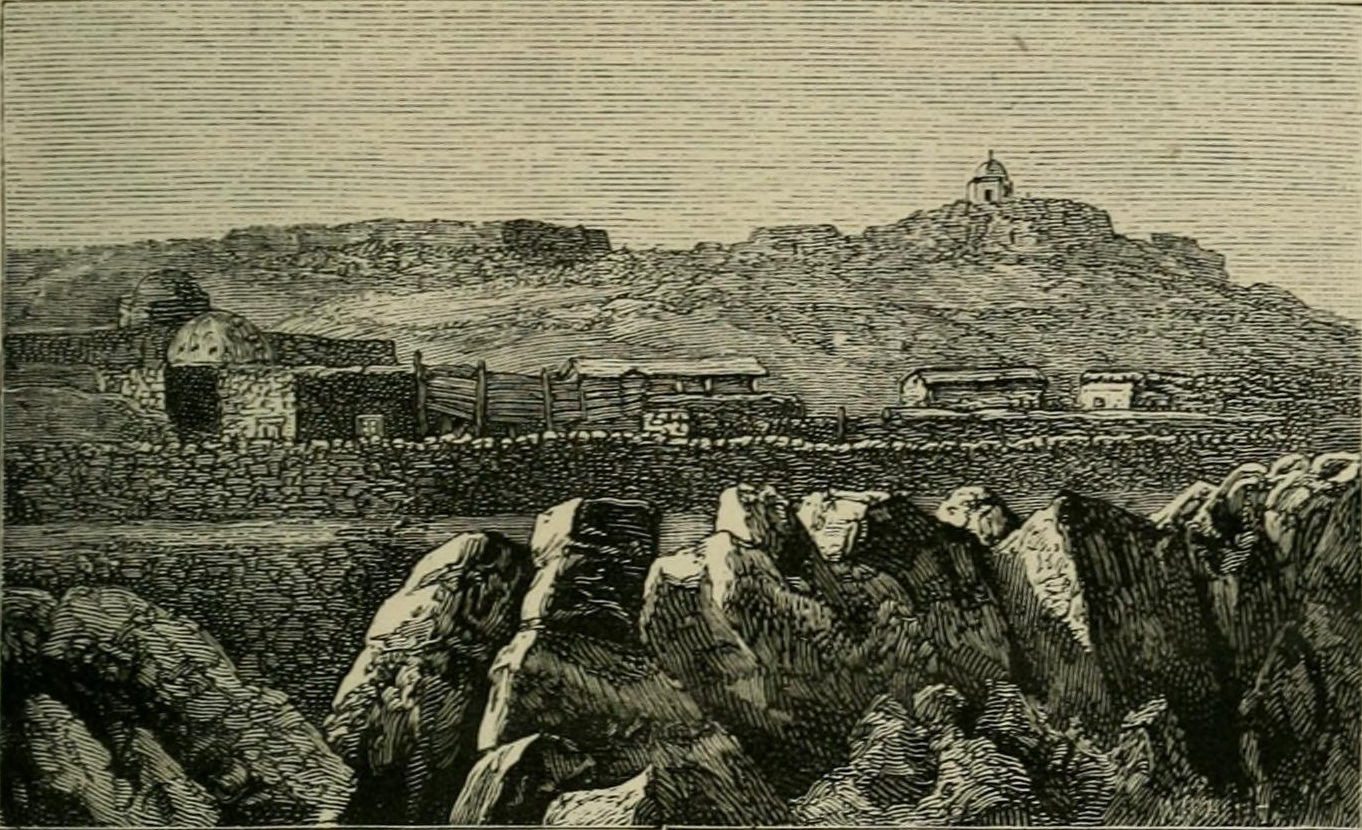
- An 1886 drawing of the village of ash-Shaykh Saad

- Location within Syria
- Coordinates: 32°50′9″N 36°2′6″E
- Grid position: 247/249 PAL
- Country: Syria
- Governorate: Daraa
- District: Izraa
- Nahiyah: Nawa

Population (2004 census)
  - Total: 3,373
- Time zone: UTC+2 (EET)
  - Summer (DST): UTC+3 (EEST)

Ash-Shaykh Saad (Arabic: الشيخ سعد ash-Shaykh Saʿad; also Romanized Sheikh Saad), historically also called Karnaim and Dair Ayyub ("Monastery of Job"), is a village in southern Syria, administratively part of the Daraa Governorate, located northwest of Daraa on the Jordan–Syria border. Nearby localities include Nawa, Jasim and al-Harrah to the north, Izraa and ash-Shaykh Miskin to the east, Tafas and Da'el to the southeast, and Adawan and Tasil to the west and Jalin to the southwest. According to the Syria Central Bureau of Statistics, ash-Shaykh Saad had a population of 3,373 in the 2004 census. Its inhabitants are predominantly Sunni Muslims.

== History ==
=== Bronze Age ===
An Egyptian stele, commemorating a campaign of Pharaoh Ramesses II, is locally venerated in a mosque as the "Rock of Job" (see below). The basalt monolith, measuring 7 by 4 feet (2.1 m × 1.2 m), is split by a horizontal crack.

=== Iron Age ===
Initially the city was known as Karnaim. During Aramaean and Assyrian rule, once the neighbouring city of Ashteroth lost its prominence, Karnaim annexed its name, becoming the capital of the land of Bashan under the name Ashteroth-Karnaim.

In the Hebrew Bible the city was mentioned as Ashteroth-Karnaim in Genesis 14:5, and Karnaim in Amos 6:13.

=== Hellenistic period ===
During the Hellenistic period, the city was referred to as Karnein, a place held sacred by its local inhabitants. In the days of Judas Maccabaeus (ca. 165 BCE) who fitted out a military expedition against the region, the sacred precinct was burnt to the ground.

=== Late Roman-Early Byzantine period ===
It was mentioned by several Christian scholars and pilgrims, including Eusebius, Egeria and Jerome, as the city of St. Job.

=== Crusader/Ayyubid period ===
During the Crusades, the town was part of the Principality of Galilee. In 1129 the town was ceded by William I of Bures, Prince of Galilee, to the Abbey of St. Mary of the Valley of Jehoshaphat. This transfer was noted in the records of Baldwin II in 1130, and of Pope Anastasius IV in 1154. In June 1187, before the Battle of Hattin, Saladin chose to assemble his troops in the town before starting his campaigns.

The village was visited by Syrian geographer Yaqut al-Hamawi in the early 13th century, during Ayyubid rule. At the time, the village's name was Dair Ayyub ("the monastery of Job"). He noted that it was a village "of the Hauran, in the Damascus Province. This is where Job dwelt, and where Allah tried him. There is here a spring, where he struck with his feet the rock that was over it (and the water gushed out). Job's tomb also is here."

=== Ottoman period ===
The village was later known by the name of a more recent and local Muslim holy man, Shaykh Saad. The sheikh, according to tradition, was a native of Sudanese origins who brought many African slaves to work in the village. Shaykh Saad then established a Muslim "monastery" for his black slaves, and later granted them their freedom. A rivalry has since existed between the local fellahin who consider St. Job to be the patron of their village, and the descendants of the African slaves to whom Shaykh Saad was their saviour. The Africans also settled in Jalin.

Under the Ottomans, the village became the capital of Hauran Sanjak for some time, and the residence of the local governor, or Mutasarrıf. In 1596 al-Shaykh Saad appeared in the Ottoman tax registers as Sayh Sa'd, being in the nahiya of Jawlan Sarqi in the Qada of Hauran. It had a population of 3 households and 1 bachelor, all Muslim. The villagers paid a fixed tax rate of 25% on wheat, barley, summer crops and rice; a total of 2,100 akçe.

Gottlieb Schumacher surveyed the village in 1884, and recorded that it was "miserable looking place, containing about 60 huts built of stone and mud, many of them now fallen to ruin. It has a population of about 220 souls, all without exception negroes." In a bid to bring Hauran under further centralization, in 1892 the Ottoman government of Damascus pressed for the completion of land registration in al-Shaykh Sa'ad—still the regional capital—as well in other major towns in the area.

In 1918, towards the end of the Arab Revolt during World War I, ash-Shaykh Saad was captured by the Arab Army headed by T. E. Lawrence. The village served as their launching point for the subsequent battle in Tafas, where the Arabs defeated the Ottoman army.

== Association with St. Job ==
=== Home and tomb of Job ===
The village was associated with St. Job since at least the 4th-century CE. Karnein was mentioned in Eusebius' Onomasticon as a town of Bashan that was said to be the location of the house of St. Job. Egeria the pilgrim relates that a church was built over the place in March or February 384 CE, and that the place was known as the "town of Job", or "civitas Job." According to Egeria's account the body of St. Job was laid in a stone coffin below the altar.

=== "Job's Bath" ===
According to tradition, Hammam Ayyub is a fountain in the village where Job washed himself when he had leprosy, and is reputed to have healing powers.

=== "Rock of Job" ===
Another holy artifact in the village is the "Rock of Job," known in local folklore as the place where he sat when he was afflicted with the disease, and is housed inside a mosque dedicated to Nabi Ayyub. The rock has been identified as an Egyptian stele dedicated to Ramesses II (see above).

== Religious buildings ==
- Mosque
- Mosque
- Maqam Prophet Ayyub/Job

== Bibliography ==
- Hanauer, J.E.(1907): Folk-lore of the Holy Land. Moslem, Christian and Jewish
- Hütteroth, W.-D.; Abdulfattah, K. (1977). Historical Geography of Palestine, Transjordan and Southern Syria in the Late 16th Century. Erlanger Geographische Arbeiten, Sonderband 5. Erlangen, Germany: Vorstand der Fränkischen Geographischen Gesellschaft. ISBN 3-920405-41-2.
- van Kasteren, J. P. (1892). "Zur Geschichte von Schech Sa´d". Zeitschrift des Deutschen Palästina-Vereins. 15–16: 196–204.
- Le Strange, Guy (1890). Palestine Under the Moslems: A Description of Syria and the Holy Land from A.D. 650 to 1500. Committee of the Palestine Exploration Fund.
- Negev, Avraham; Gibson, S. (2005). Archaeological Encyclopedia of the Holy Land. Continuum International Publishing Group. ISBN 9780826485717.
- Pringle, D. (1998). The Churches of the Crusader Kingdom of Jerusalem: Volume II L-Z (excluding Tyre). Cambridge University Press. ISBN 0-521-39037-0.
- Rogan, E. (2002). Frontiers of the State in the Late Ottoman Empire: Transjordan, 1850-1921. Cambridge University Press. ISBN 0-521-89223-6.
- Röhricht, R. (1893). (RRH) Regesta regni Hierosolymitani (MXCVII-MCCXCI) (in Latin). Berlin: Libraria Academica Wageriana.
- Schneider, James J. (2011). Guerrilla Leader: T. E. Lawrence and the Arab Revolt. Random House Digital, Inc. ISBN 978-0553807646.
- Schumacher, G.; Oliphant, L.; Le Strange, G. (1886). Across the Jordan: being an exploration and survey of part of Hauran and Jaulan. Bentley.
- Schumacher, G. (2010). The Jaulân: Surveyed for the German Society for the Exploration of the Holy Land. Cambridge University Press. ISBN 9781108017565.
- Schumacher, G. (1890). "Der Hiobstein, Sachrat Eijub, im Hauran". Zeitschrift des Deutschen Palästina-Vereins. 13–14: 142–147.
- Hanauer, J.E. (1907). Folk-lore of the Holy Land. London, Duckworth & co.
