= Martyr Muhammad al-Deif Brigades =

Militant organization in Syria and Palestine

- كتائب الشهيد محمد الضيف
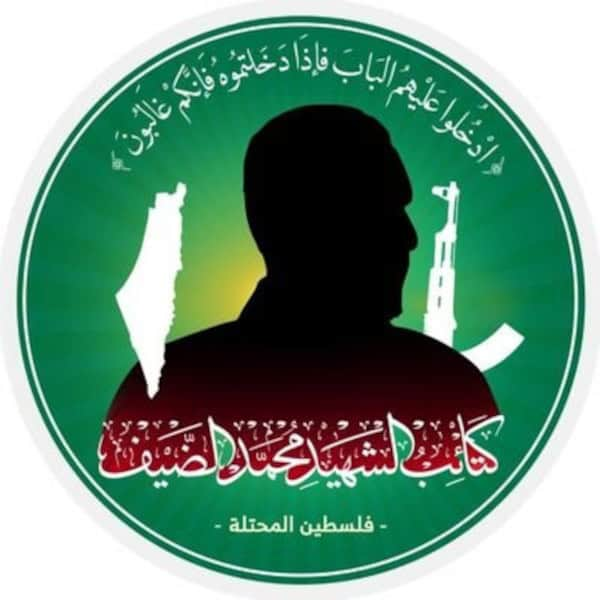
- Founded: 31 May 2025
- Dates active: 2025 – present
- Country: Syria; Palestine
- Headquarters: Tasil, Syria; Gaza
- Active regions: Daraa Governorate; Gaza Strip
- Ideology: Anti-Zionism
- Status: Active
- Wars: Syrian civil war; Israeli invasion of Syria (2024–present); Gaza War; Israeli invasion of the Gaza Strip
- Website: Telegram channel

Martyr Muhammad al-Deif Brigades (Arabic: كتائب الشهيد محمد الضيف, romanized: kataib al-shahid muhammad al-daif) is a militant organization in Syria.

== History ==
=== Foundation ===
The organization was formed on 31 May 2025, and issued a "founding declaration" in central Palestine, The unit is named after Mohammed Deif, the former military commander of Hamas's Izz al-Din al-Qassam Brigades, who was killed in an Israeli airstrike in July 2024 during the Gaza war.

=== Operations in Syria ===
On 3 June, a barrage of Grad rockets was fired at Israel from Tasil, setting off sirens in northern Israel and the Golan Heights. The rockets struck open areas near Ramat Magshimim, and the IDF responded with artillery fire. A second barrage was fired minutes later, but it is unclear if it came from Syria. Martyr Mohammed Al-Deif Brigade claimed responsibility for the attack.

Hamas denied any relationship with the Martyr Muhammed al-Deif Brigades, disavowing its composition and leadership.

=== Operations in the Gaza Strip ===
On June 8, they launched attacks on the Israeli army from the Gaza Strip. On July 1, 2025, an attack on the Israel Defense Forces was claimed by the group, from the Gaza Strip.
