= Al-Shajara, Syria =

Al-Shajara الشجرة
- Town
- Location within Syria
- Coordinates: 32°46′18″N 35°52′59″E
- PAL: 232/242
- Country: Syria
- Governorate: Daraa
- District: Daraa
- Subdistrict: Al-Shajara

Population (2004)
  - Total: 6,567
- Time zone: UTC+3 (AST)

Al-Shajara (Arabic: الشجرة, also spelled ash-Shajarah) is a town in southern Syria, administratively part of the Daraa Governorate, located west of Daraa, in between the Israel Golan Heights and Jordan. Nearby localities include Saham al-Jawlan to the east, Nafia to the north, Jamla to the northwest and Beit Ara to the southwest. The village center has an elevation of 410 meters (1,350 ft) above sea level.

According to the Syria Central Bureau of Statistics, al-Shajara had a population of 6,567 in the 2004 census. It is the administrative center of the al-Shajara nahiyah (subdistrict) which consisted of 17 localities with a combined population of 34,206 in 2004. Its population is predominantly Sunni Muslim.

== History ==
=== Ottoman period ===
In the Ottoman tax registers of 1596, it was located in the nahiya of Jawlan Sharqi, Qada of Hawran. It had a population of 5 households and 2 bachelors, all Muslims. They paid a fixed tax-rate of 25% on agricultural products, including wheat, barley, summer crops, goats and beehives, winter pasture/grass lands, in addition to occasional revenues; a total of 1,988 akçe.

In 1838 Eli Smith noted that the place was located west of the Hajj road, and that it was populated with Sunni Muslims. In the early or mid-19th century Shajara often suffered incursions from the regional Bedouin (nomadic or semi-nomadic) tribes. This state of affairs ended when Sheikh Abd Allah al-Midyab, a respected leader of one the western Hauran's strongest families and a former Bedouin, moved to the village from Nawa and assumed control. Bedouin raids ceased and Shajara developed considerably and prospered, though by the late 19th century most of the population were highly indebted to wealthy Damascene creditors.

In 1884 the archaeologist Gottlieb Schumacher noted that Shajara was a large village with a population of over 450 Muslims living in 138 houses. The village was divided into upper and lower quarters, the former home to the sheikh (village headman; Abd Allah al-Midyab), his family and other relatives and the latter home to the village's fellahin (farmers, peasants). Around the lower quarter was a poorer suburb mostly home to the newer arrivals to Shajara coming from neighboring villages or from among the local Bedouin. The upper quarter was "remarkable for its wide streets" and the homes were "nearly built of masonry". The homes in the lower quarter were characteristic of most villages in the Hauran, being built of stone and mud. The suburb's homes were "mean hovels". The inhabitants owned large flocks of sheep and cattle, which grazed in the village's considerable pasture grounds; the hilly area to its north contained numerous sheepfolds. Shajara lacked significant fertile lands but had vegetable and melon gardens fed by the Ayn al-Aliya perennial spring to its west. The village was also supplied by the Bir al-Shajara well.

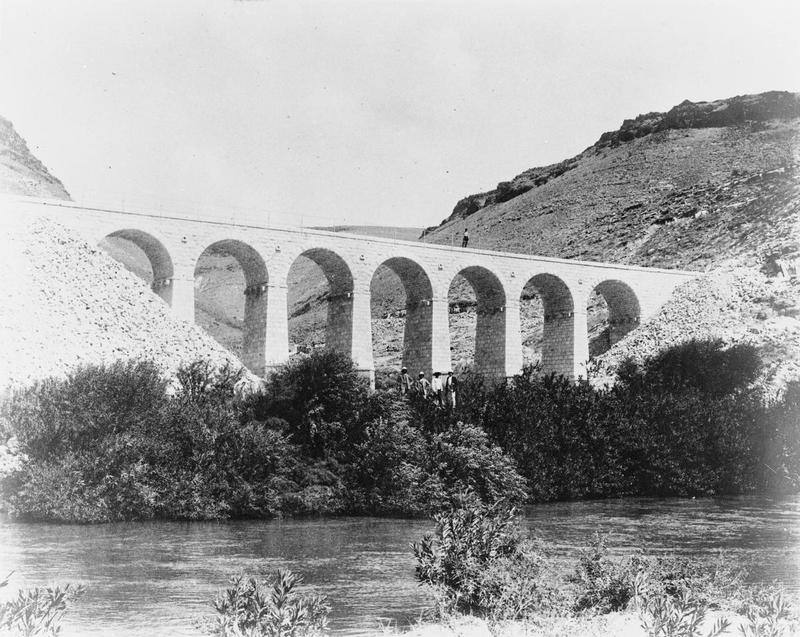
Railway bridge over the Yarmuk right east of ash-Shajara station, 1908

In 1908 the Daraa–Haifa railway line started operating and Shajara was connected with the Shajara train station far south of the city in the valley of the Yarmuk, in this section drowned in the waters of the al-Wehda Dam since 2007.

=== Civil war ===
By September 2016, during the Syrian civil war, al-Shajara was controlled by the Khalid ibn al-Walid Army branch of ISIL. In an offensive on ISIS' pocket in southern Syria, the Syrian Armed Forces took control of this former ISIS stronghold in July 2018.

== Bibliography ==
- Hütteroth, W.-D.; Abdulfattah, K. (1977). Historical Geography of Palestine, Transjordan and Southern Syria in the Late 16th Century. Erlanger Geographische Arbeiten, Sonderband 5. Erlangen, Germany: Vorstand der Fränkischen Geographischen Gesellschaft. ISBN 3-920405-41-2.
- Robinson, E.; Smith, E. (1841). Biblical Researches in Palestine, Mount Sinai and Arabia Petraea: A Journal of Travels in the year 1838. Vol. 3. Boston: Crocker & Brewster.
- Schumacher, Gottlieb (1886). Across the Jordan: Being an Exploration and Survey of part of Hauran and Jaulan. London: Richard Bentley and Son.
