= Adawan =

Adwan عدوان
- Village
- Location within Syria
- Coordinates: 32°49′18″N 35°59′42″E
- Grid position: 243/247 PAL
- Country: Syria
- Governorate: Daraa
- District: Izraa
- Nahiyah: Nawa

Population (2004 census)
  - Total: 2,487
- Time zone: UTC+2 (EET)
  - Summer (DST): UTC+3 (EEST)

Adawan (Arabic: عدوان) is a village in southern Syria, administratively part of Izraa District in the Daraa Governorate. Nearby localities include ash-Shaykh Saad to the east, Saham al-Jawlan to the southwest and Tasil to the west. According to the Syria Central Bureau of Statistics, Adawan had a population of 2,487 in the 2004 census. Its inhabitants are predominantly Sunni Muslims.

== History ==
In 1596, Adawan appeared in the Ottoman tax registers as "'Udwan" and was part of the nahiya of Jawlan Sarqi in the Qada of Hauran. It had an entirely Muslim population consisting of 21 households and 15 bachelors. The villagers paid a fixed tax-rate of 25% on wheat, barley, summer crops, goats and beehives; a total of 700 akçe.

In the late 19th-century, Adawan was a medium-sized village inhabited by the Bedouin Adawan tribe. Its buildings, which included around 40 huts and a few ancient ruins, were mostly built of stone and mud. The village had a population of about 140.

=== Civil war ===
On 9 August 2022, an Iraqi commander of the Islamic State by the name of 'Abu Salim al-Iraqi' blew himself up after he was besieged by Syrian military forces in the village.

== Religious buildings ==
- The Old Umari Mosque (also known as the Stone Mosque)
- Abu Bakr al-Siddiq Mosque

== Bibliography ==
- Hütteroth, W.-D.; Abdulfattah, K. (1977). Historical Geography of Palestine, Transjordan and Southern Syria in the Late 16th Century. Erlanger Geographische Arbeiten, Sonderband 5. Erlangen, Germany: Vorstand der Fränkischen Geographischen Gesellschaft. ISBN 3-920405-41-2.
- Schumacher, G.; Oliphant, L.; le Strange, G. (1889). Across the Jordan: being an exploration and survey of part of Hauran and Jaulan. Bentley.
