= Nahr al-Allan =

River in Syria

Coordinates: 32°43′20″N 35°53′55″E

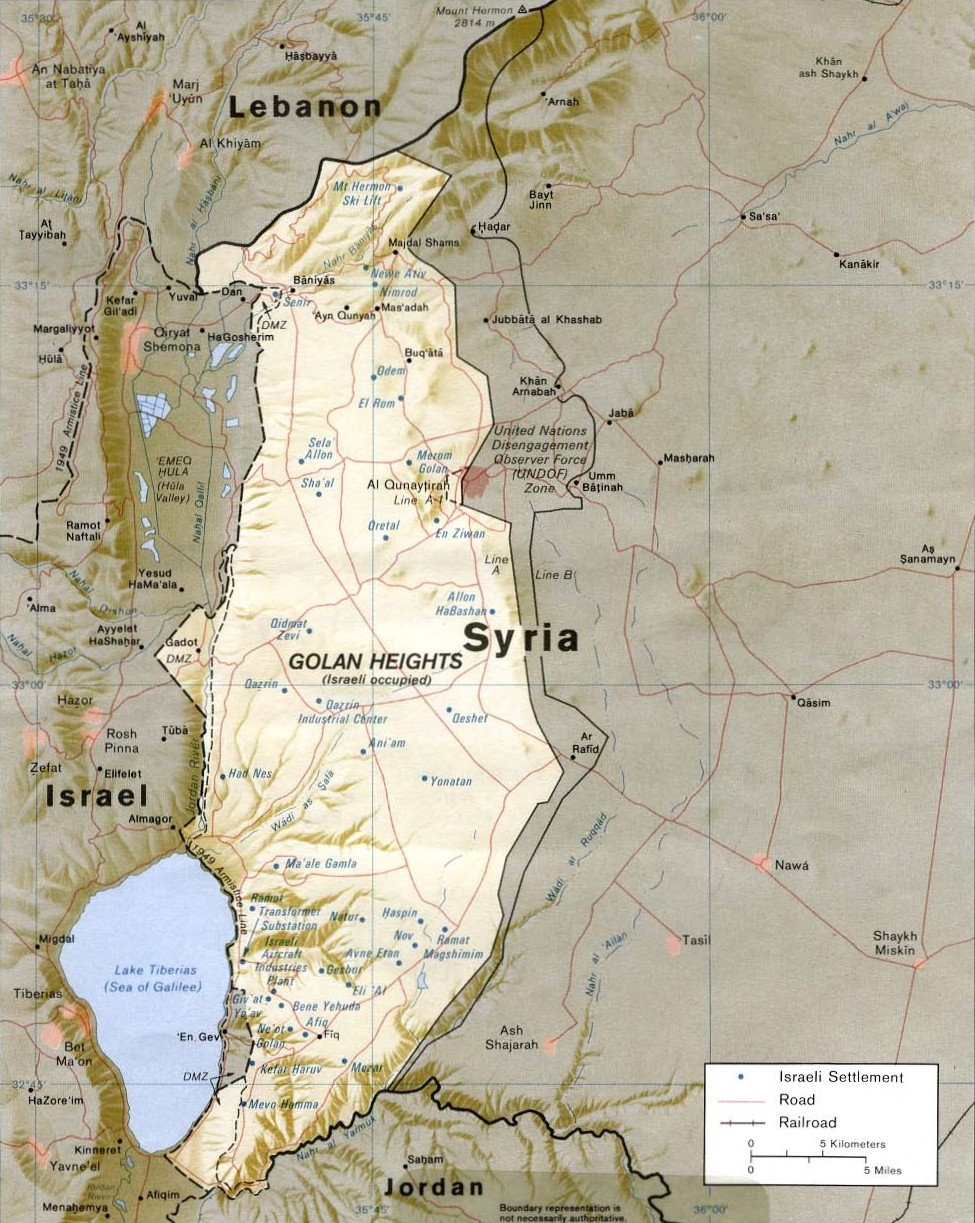
1994 CIA map of Golan Heights and vicinity, showing the Allan

Nahr al-'Allan (also Nahr 'Allan, Wadi 'Allan etc.) is a river in southern Syria which traditionally marks the natural boundary between the Hauran plain and the Golan Heights, though this boundary can alternatively be placed at Nahr al-Ruqqad instead. The Allan is one of the tributaries of the Yarmuk, which marks part of the border between Syria and Jordan.

== Course ==
The length of the Allan is about 19 kilometers (12 mi).

The river flows southward from the foot of Tell al-Hara, a volcanic cone representing the highest point in the Hauran plain, through the stony, volcanic cone-covered country where the river has an altitude of approximately 440 meters (1,440 ft) above sea level. Here it is slightly lower than the roughly parallel Ruqqad river, which flows 5.5 kilometers (3.4 mi) west of the Allan. The river's altitude declines to about 410 meters (1,350 ft) after it passes near the tell of Beit Akkar, considered by some scholars to be the site of the biblical city of Golan, then drops another 18 meters (59 ft) down a cliff. The river becomes narrow at this point and is joined by a ravine called the Wadi Beit Akkar. After about 0.8 kilometers (0.50 mi), the river again falls about 18 meters (59 ft) over a cliff. A little beyond this point it is joined by the stream historically known as Wadi Jabala. The 'Wadi Jabala' is an ancient toponym derived from the name of the Ghassanid phylarch Jabala ibn al-Harith, which no longer appears on modern maps. Around 2 miles (3.2 km) after the Allan passes Hayt it is joined by Nahr al-Harir (or Ehreir), and after a further 2 miles (3.2 km) the river flowss into the Yarmuk at an elevation of 55 meters (180 ft) above sea level.

== Bibliography ==
- Cordesman, Anthony H. (2008). Israel and Syria: The Military Balance and Prospects of War. Greenwood Publishing. ISBN 978-0-313-35520-2.
- Schumacher, Gottlieb (1886). Across the Jordan: Being an Exploration and Survey of Part of Hauran and Jaulan. London: Richard Bentley and Son.
- Shahid, Irfan (2002). Byzantium and the Arabs in the Sixth Century, Volume 2, Issue 1. Washington, D.C.: Dumbarton Oaks and Research Library.
