= Saham al-Jawlan =

Village in Syria

Saham al-Jawlan سحم الجولان
- Village
- Location within the Golan Heights Location within Syria
- Coordinates: 32°46′52″N 35°56′5″E
- Grid position: 237/243 PAL
- Country: Syria
- Governorate: Daraa
- District: Daraa
- Subdistrict: al-Shajara

Population (2004)
  - Total: 6,572
- Time zone: UTC+3 (AST)

Saham al-Jawlan, Sahem el-Jolan or Saham el-Golan (Arabic: سحم الجولان, romanized: Saḥam al-Jawlān) is a Syrian village in the Daraa Governorate, in the Hauran region. It had a population of 6,572 in 2004. Most residents work in the cultivation of cereals, olives and vegetables. It lays a few kilometres east of Wadi 'Allan, a stream sometimes referred to as the border between the Hauran plain and the Golan Heights, the other alternative being the Ruqqad, which flows further west.

== History ==
=== Antiquity ===
The village has remains dating back to the 4th century. It was suggested to be the biblical city of Golan. According to Yoel Elitsur, this is a wrong understanding of the name Sahem al-Jawlan witch should be understood to mean the Sahem of the Golan as opposed to Saham Al Kfara near Irbid.

=== Ottoman period ===
In 1596 Saham al-Jawlan appeared in the Ottoman tax registers as part of the nahiya of Jawlan Sharqi in the Qada of Hauran. It had a Muslim population consisting of 22 households and 15 bachelors. A fixed tax−rate of 25% were paid on wheat, barley, summer crops, goats and/or beehives; a total of 4,000 akçe.

In 1884 the American archaeologist Gottlieb Schumacher visited Saham al-Jawlan and described it as a large village of 280 people in the Hauran plain, though administratively attached to the Jawlan (Golan) nahiya centered in Quneitra rather than the Hauran nahiya centered in al-Shaykh Saad. The village was divided into three detached neighborhoods. He noted Saham al-Jawlan's houses were better built than other villages in the Jawlan and were constructed of stone reused from ancient Christian dwellings, rather than the mud houses prevalent in the area.

More than half of the village's dwellings had been abandoned and/or in disrepair by the time of Schumacher's visit. At least sixty or seventy were still inhabited. The streets of the village were wide and mostly straight. Most of the ancient or medieval dwellings and ruins were located in Saham al-Jawlan's northern quarter, including the home of the village sheikh, which had formerly been a Crusader church and remained well-preserved. It was rectangularly-shaped, built of hewn basalt, measured 24 by 10 meters (79 ft × 33 ft) and consisted of a single story with a flat roof. Many of the slabs and lintels from which the structure was built were decorated with crosses, crescents and vegetal motifs. The ancient buildings surrounding the sheikh's home were inhabited by his relatives. In the southeast corner of the village stood a 15 meters (49 ft)-high tower locally called the Jami' or the Madani; it appeared similar to the towers in the Hauran villages of Daraa, Tafas and Nawa.

Despite the village's healthy climate and productive soil, its population was in decline. The vegetable gardens and fruit trees planted along the Wadi al-Shafayl stream west of Saham al-Jawlan were also in a poor state. Schumacher attributed the village's decline to the inhabitants' heavy indebtnedness to creditors, to whom most of the village's farmlands and homes had been pledged as collateral.

==== Jewish Land Purchase ====
In 1891, the Agudat Ahim society headquartered in Yekatrinoslav, Russian Empire, acquired 100,000 dunams of land in Saham al-Jawlan for Jewish agricultural settlement. The village lands were purchased from Muhammad Sa'id Pasha Shamdin, a Damascene military official who owned considerable tracts in the Hauran. Muhammad Sa'id had purchased the village cheaply and turned a significant profit in its sale to the Jewish colonization company.

Due to the Ottoman ban on land purchase by Palestinian Jews, the permits were acquired by Baron Edmond de Rothschild. In the Palestine Exploration Fund's visit to the village in 1895, the expedition noted the residents of Saham al-Jawlan protested the sale of their village to the Jewish land company and refused to leave. In 1895, the village of Tiferet Binyamin was established on the land, but the Jews were forced to leave in July 1896, when the Ottomans evicted 17 non-Ottoman families and issued an order that led to the expulsion of all East European Jews from the Golan Heights. A later attempt to settle the site with Syrian Jews, who were Ottoman citizens, was not successful. In 1921–1930, during the French Mandate, the Palestine Jewish Colonization Association (PICA) obtained the deeds to the Rothschild estate in Saham al-Jawlan and continued to manage it, collecting rent from the Arab peasants living there.

=== Civil war ===
From March 2017 to July 2018 Saham al-Jawlan was under the control of the Islamic State of Iraq and the Levant (ISIL). On 26 July 2018, the Syrian Army's 4th Armored Division and Tiger Forces following an intense battle with the ISIL-affiliated Jaysh Khaled bin Walid forces regained control of the town Saham al-Jawlan.

== See also ==
- Yavne'el, a village in the Galilee settled in 1901 by Jewish families evicted from Saham al-Jawlan who first took refuge in Metula and Rosh Pinna

== Bibliography ==
- Fishbach, M. R. (2008). Jewish Property Claims Against Arab Countries. Columbia University Press.
- Gil-Har, Yitzhak (1981). Lee Levine, Yad Yitzhak Ben Zvi (ed.). Separation of Trans-Jordan from Palestine. Jerusalem: Wayne State University.
- Hütteroth, W.-D.; Abdulfattah, K. (1977). Historical Geography of Palestine, Transjordan and Southern Syria in the Late 16th Century. Erlanger Geographische Arbeiten, Sonderband 5. Erlangen, Germany: Vorstand der Fränkischen Geographischen Gesellschaft. ISBN 3-920405-41-2.
- Katz, Yosef (1994). The "Business" of Settlement: Private Entrepreneurship in the Jewish Settlement of Palestine, 1900–1914. Jerusalem: Magnes Press, Hebrew University. ISBN 965-223-863-5.
- Orni, Efraim; Efrat, Elisha (1971). Geography of Israel. Israel Universities Press.
- Palestine Exploration Fund (1895). Quarterly Statement for 1895. London: Society's Office and A. P. Watt and Son.
- Schumacher, G. (1886). Across the Jordan: Being an Exploration and Survey of part of Hauran and Jaulan. London: Richard Bentley and Son.
