= Islamic Muthanna Movement =

Militant group in Syria

- حركة المثنى الإسلامية; Harakat al-Muthanna al-Islamiya
- Flag of Harakat al-Muthanna al-Islamiya
- Dates active: 2012 – 21 May 2016
- Active regions: Daraa Governorate, Syria
- Ideology: Islamism; Salafi jihadism
- Part of: Islamic State (allegedly)
- Wars: the Syrian Civil War

The Islamic Muthanna Movement (Arabic: حركة المثنى الإسلامية, Harakat al-Muthanna al-Islamiya) was a Syrian Salafist rebel group based in Daraa that had been active during Syrian Civil War. After its formation in 2012 as the "Muthanna bin Haritha Vanquisher of the Persians Battalion" (كتيبة المثنى بن حارثة قاهر الفرس), it expanded to a sizable group. The group has been described by the As-Safir newspaper as "one of the most powerful armed factions in Daraa".

The group has joined multiple operations rooms. The movement worked with a unit of Ahrar ash-Sham called the Harmayn Brigade and the al-Nusra Front in July 2013. The group worked with another unit of Ahrar ash-Sham named Aknaf Bayt al-Muqadis as well as three other Islamist groups on 20 October 2013. The movement joined an operation room with other hardline Islamist groups in Daraa on 3 March 2015 which included the al-Nusra Front, Ahrar ash-Sham and Ansar Bayt al-Maqdis.

Although the group is considered close to al-Nusra, there were reports it declared its support for the Islamic State of Iraq and the Levant in March 2015. It subsequently came into conflict with the Free Syrian Army-aligned Liwa al-Mutaz Billah group. However, on 25 March 2015, it supported the FSA in taking the town of Bosra.

In January 2016, it came into conflict with the Southern Front and the Yarmouk Army after it was accused by them of "kidnappings, assassinations and intimidation" and harboring sympathies for the Islamic State of Iraq and the Levant (ISIL). In March 2016, Muthanna and the pro-ISIL Yarmouk Martyrs Brigade fought against fighters from al-Nusra Front and Ahrar ash-Sham over control of villages near the border with Jordan and the Golan Heights.

On 29 March 2016, dozens of their members splintered-off to form an FSA-aligned group called al-Murabitin Brigade. In April 2016, there were reports that Muthanna Movement had merged with the Yarmouk Martyrs Brigade, although the group denied these reports at the time, in May 2016 Muthanna, Jaysh al-Jihad and the Martyrs Brigade announced they had united together as the Khalid ibn al-Walid Army.

== See also ==
- List of armed groups in the Syrian Civil War
