= Yarmuk (river) =

River in Jordan, Syria and Israel

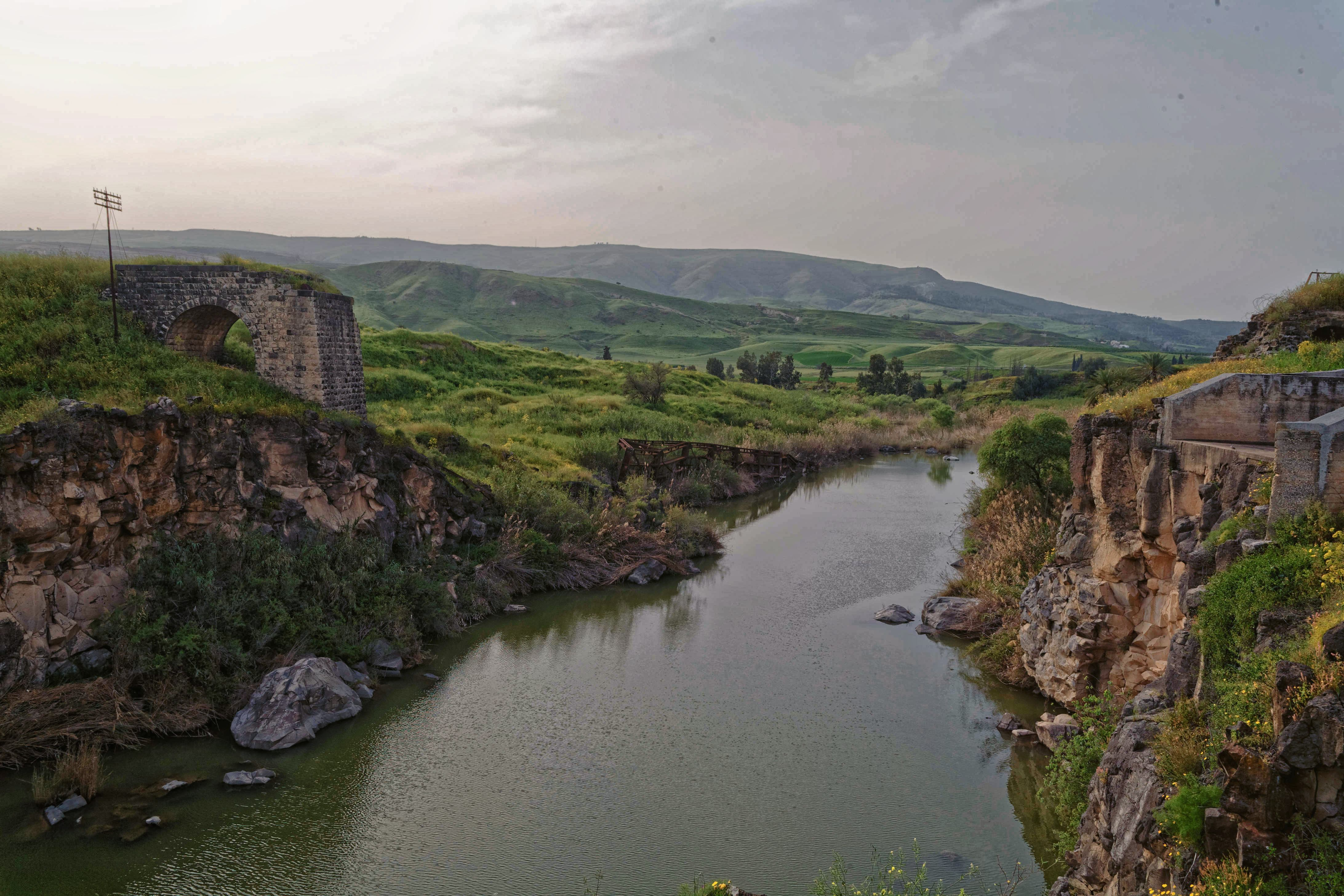
- Yarmuk River near the Naharayim/Baqura area
- Native name: نهر اليرموك (Arabic); נְהַר הַיַּרְמוּךְ (Hebrew)

Location
- Country: Syria, Jordan, Israel
- Region: West Asia, Eastern Mediterranean littoral

Physical characteristics
- Source
  - location: Hauran
- Mouth: Jordan River
  - location: Naharayim/Baqura Area Israel/Jordan
  - coordinates: 32°38′39″N 35°34′22″E
- Length: Approx. 70 km (43 mi)
- Basin size: Approx. 7,000 km^{2} (2,700 sq mi)
- Discharge
  - average: 14.5 m^{3}/s (510 cu ft/s)

Basin features
- Tributaries
  - left: Ruqqad, 'Allan
  - right: Ehreir, Zeizun

The Yarmuk River (Arabic: نهر اليرموك, romanized: Nahr al-Yarmūk, Hebrew: נְהַר הַיַּרְמוּךְ, romanized: Nəhar hayYarmūḵ; Greek: Ἱερομύκης, Hieromýkēs; Latin: Hieromyces or Heromicas; sometimes spelled Yarmouk) is the largest tributary of the Jordan River. It runs in Jordan, Syria and Israel, and drains much of the Hauran plateau. Its main tributaries are the wadis of 'Allan and Ruqqad from the north, Ehreir and Zeizun from the east. Although the Yarmuk is narrow and shallow throughout its course, at its mouth it is nearly as wide as the Jordan, measuring 30 ft (9.1 m) in breadth and 5 ft (1.5 m) in depth.

== History ==
Yarmuk forms a natural border between the plains to the north — Hauran, Bashan and Golan — and the Gilead mountains to the south. Thus it has often served as boundary line between political entities.

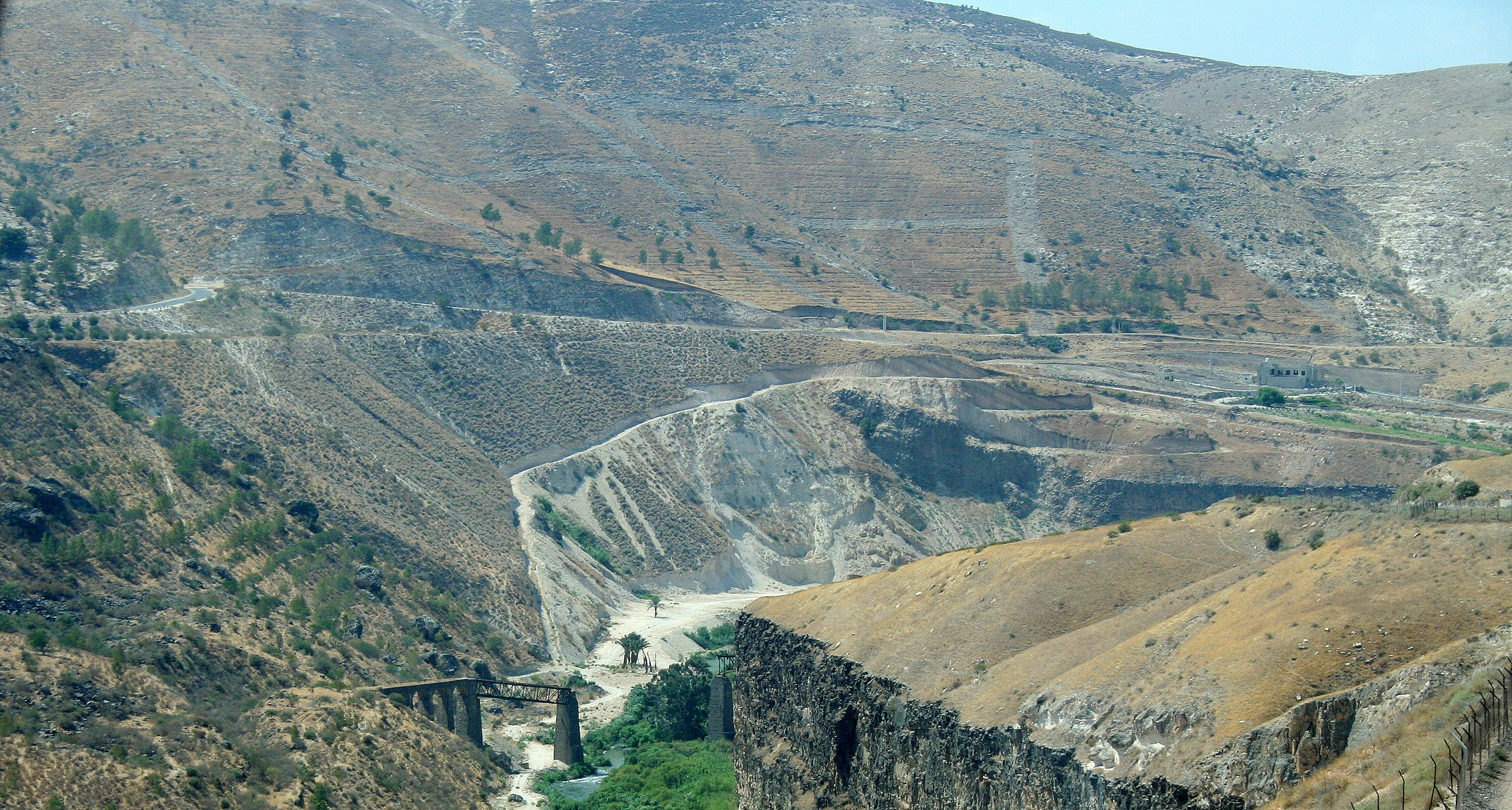
Yarmouk River

=== Neolithic ===
The Yarmukian is a Pottery Neolithic culture that inhabited parts of Israel and Jordan. Its type site is at Sha'ar HaGolan, on the river mouth.

=== Bronze Age ===
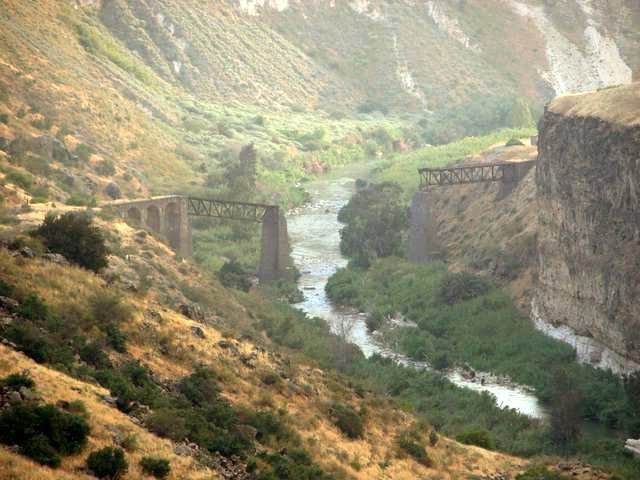
Railway bridge over the Yarmouk River, destroyed during the Night of the Bridges in June 1946

Early Bronze Age I is represented in the Golan only in the area of the river.

Abila (Tel Abil) is attested in the 14th-century BC Amarna Letters. This is possibly the case also for Geshur, assumed to have lain north of the river. Other historical cities on the course of the river are Dara'a, Hit, Jalin; and the archaeological sites of Tell Shihab and Khirbet ed-Duweir (See Lo-debar).

=== Iron Age ===
The Aramean kingdoms and the northern Kingdom of Israel, of the Hebrew Bible, might have set their boundary line along the Yarmouk occasionally. Under the Assyrian and Persian empires the province of Ashteroth Karnaim laid to the north, and that of Gal'azu (Gilead) to the south.

=== Hellenistic period ===
In Hellenistic times, the territory of Hippos was across from those of Gadara and Abila (Abel) on the south, while Dion sat on the eastern tributaries.

=== Roman period ===
When Pompey conquered the region in 64/63 BCE, he liberated the Hellenistic city of Gadara from Jewish Hasmonean rule (see also Decapolis). It seems that one way they celebrated the event was by damming the Yarmuk and organising a naumachia as part of games held in honour of Pompey, possibly at what is now Hammat Gader.

=== Byzantine period ===
The Battle of the Yarmuk, where Muslim forces defeated those of the Byzantine Empire and gained control of Syria, took place north of the river in CE 636.

=== 1905–1948 ===
A fork of the Hejaz Railway (connecting to the Jezreel Valley railway in Samakh) ran in the river valley from 1905 to 1946. It was deprecated after being bombed by the Jewish Haganah in the Night of the Bridges on 16 June 1946. The hydroplant of Naharayim, on the confluence with Jordan River, served Mandatory Palestine from 1932 to 1948.

=== After 1948 ===
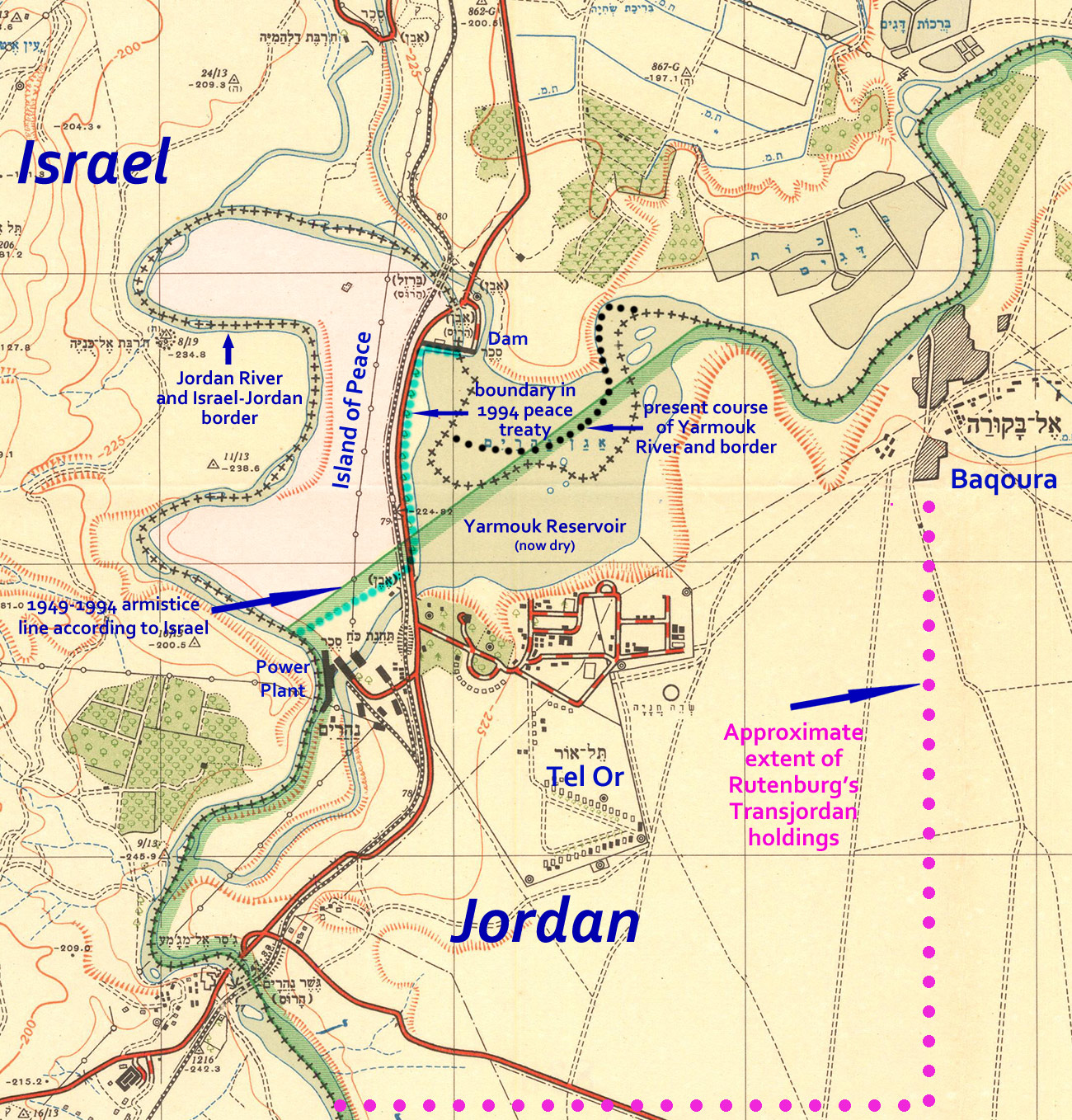
Israeli-Jordanian border at the confluence of the Jordan and Yarmuk rivers

Today, the lower part of the river, close to the Jordan Valley, forms part of the border between Israel and Jordan. Further upstream it forms part of the border between Syria and Jordan (a border largely inherited from the 1923 Franco-British Boundary Agreement). The area of Al-Hamma, or Hamat Gader in the valley is held by Israel but claimed by Syria.

The Al-Wehda Dam was constructed on the Jordan-Syria border in the 2000s. There are political agreements between Jordan and Syria (1953 and 1987) and between Jordan and Israel (1994), about the management and allocation of the shared waters of the Yarmouk.

On 8 July 2025, Jordan and Syria signed an agreement to share water from the Yarmouk River after talks at the Al-Wehda Dam. The two countries signed a deal to monitor water use together and fix problems like illegal wells. Jordan plans to try cloud seeding to increase rainfall, and Syria offered to give Jordan extra water over the summer of 2025. Both sides called the talks positive and a step toward better regional cooperation.
