= Ruqqad =

Wadi in the Golan Heights

Coordinates: 32.7790°N 35.7914°E

The Ruqqad, also known as Wadi Raqqad, is a wadi flowing in south-west Syria. It flows into the Yarmouk River, of which it is one of the main tributaries, and forms the topographical eastern boundary of the Golan Heights. It marks the south-west part of the ceasefire line between the Israel-occupied part of the Golan Heights and the Syrian-held part of the region. The Syrian controlled side was occupied by Israel in the 2024 Israeli invasion of Syria.

The Battle of Yarmuk between the Byzantines and Muslims in 636 took place in an area bordered by Wadi ar-Raqqad, close to its junction with the Yarmuk River.

== Name ==
The name is written as Wadi ar-Raqqad, al Raqqad, Ruqqad or Ruqqād, in different combinations. The word is derived from the root RQD and means more or less to sleep or lie down.
