= Khalid ibn al-Walid Army =

Jihadist organization active in the Syrian Civil War

- جيش خالد بن الوليد
- Logo of Khalid Ibn Walid Army.
- Leaders: Abu Hashim al-Hamawi; Abu Hashim al-Shami † (2016); Abu Muhammad al-Maqdisi † (2016–17); Mohammad al-Refai (2017–18)
- Dates active: 21 May 2016 – 31 July 2018 (As the Khalid ibn al-Walid Army); July 2018 – February 2020 (As Wilayat Hawran)
- Groups: Yarmouk Martyrs Brigade; Islamic Muthanna Movement; Jaysh al-Jihad
- Headquarters: Al-Shajara, Daraa Governorate, Syria
- Active regions: Daraa Governorate and Quneitra Governorate, Syria
- Ideology: Salafi jihadism
- Size: 1,900–2,400+ (in 2018)
- Part of: Islamic State

The Khalid ibn al-Walid Army (Arabic: جيش خالد بن الوليد Jaysh Khālid ibn al-Walīd) was an armed Salafi jihadist group active in southern Syria. It was formed by a merger of the Yarmouk Martyrs Brigade, the Islamic Muthanna Movement, and the Jaysh al-Jihad on 21 May 2016. The faction controlled a strip of territory southeast of the Golan Heights, and was in conflict with other forces of the Syrian rebels. The group was defeated and lost all of its territory to the Syrian Government on 31 July 2018, with many members surrendering. Many captured members of the Khalid ibn al-Walid Army were executed on the same day.

In July 2018 the group became the Islamic State – Hawran Province (Arabic: ولاية حَوْرَان).

== Name ==
The Khalid ibn al-Walid Army was named after a 7th-century Muslim commander named Khalid ibn al-Walid who led jihad on several regions in and around Arabia and also spearheaded the Muslim conquest of the Levant following the decisive Battle of Yarmouk.

== History ==
The date on the document declaring the establishment of the group was 14 Sha'aban 1437, corresponding to Saturday 21 May 2016 and was signed by Abu Hashim al-Shami (also known as Abu Hashim al-Hamawi), the emir of the group.

On 14 August 2016, the Khalid ibn al-Walid Army launched a major attack against the Army of Conquest-held town of Hawd al-Yarmouk; however, despite heavy fighting and losses on both sides, no progress was made.

In November 2016, the Khalid ibn al-Walid Army exchanged fire with an Israel Defence Force unit stationed in the Golan Heights and then allegedly asked for apologies, according to former Israeli defense minister Moshe Ya'alon. According to Aymenn Jawad Al-Tamimi, the reported apology "was deemed to be a misconception."

The group launched another offensive against the rebels in February 2017.

Logo of the Islamic State – Hawran Province

On 3 July 2018, the group became involved in the 2018 Southern Syria offensive, after launching an attack on pro-government forces in Western Daraa. They were the suspected perpetrators of a coordinated series of attacks near As-Suwayda on July 25 that killed more than 250 people and injured scores more.

In September 2019, the group released photos of a captured Syrian government intelligence officer in Daraa and later executed him.

== Territorial control and administration ==
The Khalid ibn al-Walid Army enforced the Islamic State’s form of Sharia. In the small pocket the group controlled, its fighters forced women to wear burqas and men to wear loose trousers and to grow long hair and beards. Since 2016, the group had executed more than 20 people, mostly in the town of Shajara, by beheading. The group had also locked smokers in cages and amputated people on allegations of theft.

== See also ==
- ISIL territorial claims
