= Tafas =

Tafas طفس
- Village
- Tafas dam

- Location within Syria
- Coordinates: 32°44′16″N 36°4′7.5″E
- Grid position: 250/238
- Country: Syria
- Governorate: Daraa Governorate
- District: Daraa District
- Nahiyah: Muzayrib

Population (2004 census)
  - Total: 32,236
- Time zone: UTC+3 (AST)

Tafas (Arabic: طفس, also spelled Tafs or Tuffas) is a town in southern Syria, administratively part of the Daraa Governorate, located north of Daraa. Nearby localities include al-Shaykh Saad and Nawa to the north, Da'el, Abtaa and al-Shaykh Maskin to the northeast, Saham al-Jawlan and Adwan to the northwest and Muzayrib to the southwest. According to the Syria Central Bureau of Statistics, Tafas had a population of 32,236 in the 2004 census. Its inhabitants are predominantly Sunni Muslim.

== History ==
Before the Hellenistic era, the goddess Isis Lactans was worshipped in Tafas, as evidenced by the discovery of statuette of her in the town. During the Roman era in Syria, a Jewish community existed in Tafas. Several funerary stelae, the earliest dating to 64 BCE, were found in Tafas. A bronze patera from the Roman era was also found, but it was later stolen from the Mohammedan Museum of Damascus.

=== Ottoman era ===
In 1596, Tafas appeared in Ottoman tax registers as being in the nahiya of Bani Malik al-Asraf in the Qada Hawran. It had a population of 73 households and 40 bachelors, all Muslim. The villagers paid a fixed tax rate of 40% on wheat (22,500 akçe), barley (2,700 akçe), summer crops (2,000 akçe), goats and beehives (400 akçe), in addition to occasional revenues (400 akçe).

In 1810, Tafas was "ruined" by Wahhabi tribesmen, according to Johann Ludwig Burckhardt. The modern village was founded amid its Byzantine-era ruins in 1838. The first elementary school in the village was built in 1865. In the 1880s, Tafas was described as a moderate-sized village of around 100 stone-built houses inhabited by around 250 Muslims. Some of the houses were in ruins and not inhabited. There was an active Friday mosque. A decade later, it was described as having 90 houses and 400 inhabitants.

Near the end of World War I the Tafas massacre occurred in the town. On 27 September 1918 the retreating Ottoman Army slaughtered many of the town's inhabitants, including women and children. T. E. Lawrence ordered the troops under his command to take no prisoners during the attack upon the retreating Turkish forces and all prisoners, including 250 German and Austrian soldiers were executed.

=== Civil war ===
During the Syrian Civil War, Tafas residents joined the demonstrations burning a police station and the local Ba'ath Party headquarters, three people were killed by security forces. In May 2011, the Syrian Army besieged the town, and arrested at least 250 people there. The town was held by rebel forces from 2012 until 2018, when it surrendered to the government during the 2018 Southern Syria offensive. Clashes between the government and insurgents occurred in January 2021.

== Archaeology ==
There was a square tower, known as a medany, with an elevation of 50 feet (15 m) and a width of 10 feet (3.0 m) with a square-shaped base. It consisted of two floors, each having a window. The tower was attached to a Friday mosque measuring 46 feet (14 m) by 41 feet (12 m). On its western side were terrace-like steps leading to the mosque's roof, which was supported by three rows of columns, each row consisting of four columns, the shafts of which had a height of 5 feet (1.5 m). The entire column stood at 9 feet 5 inches (2.87 m). In each row, the two center columns stood out independently while the first and last columns were built into the wall. Together with the arches the total height of the mosque's interior space was nearly 16 feet (4.9 m). The mosque was largely constructed sometime during the Islamic era, although there were some architectural elements dating to the Roman or Byzantine era.
