= Gottlieb Schumacher =

American-born archaeologist (1857–1925)

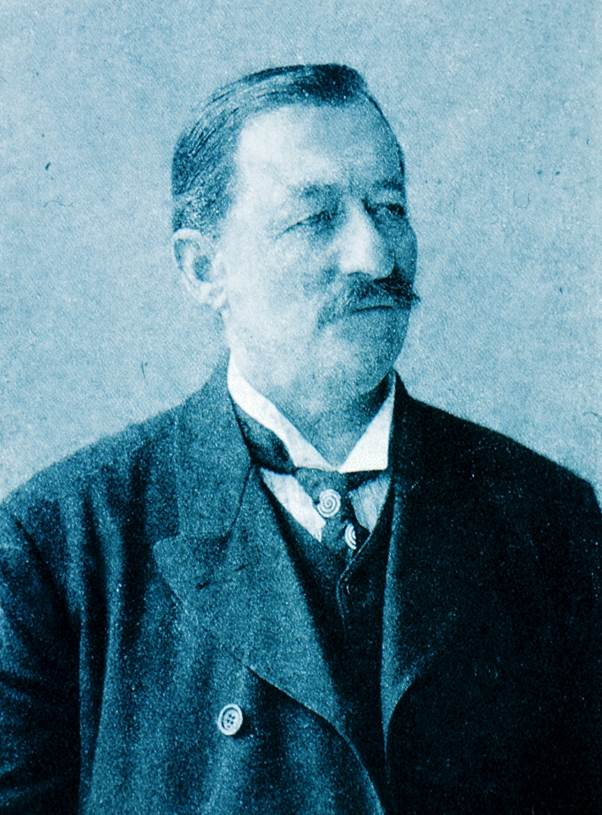
Gottlieb Schumacher

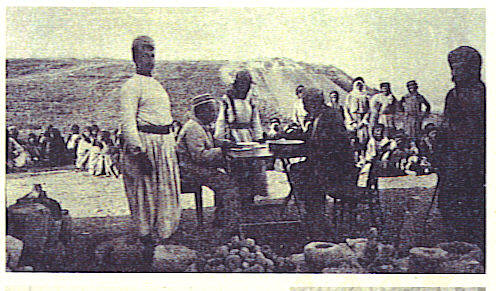
Gottlieb Schumacher at Tel Megiddo

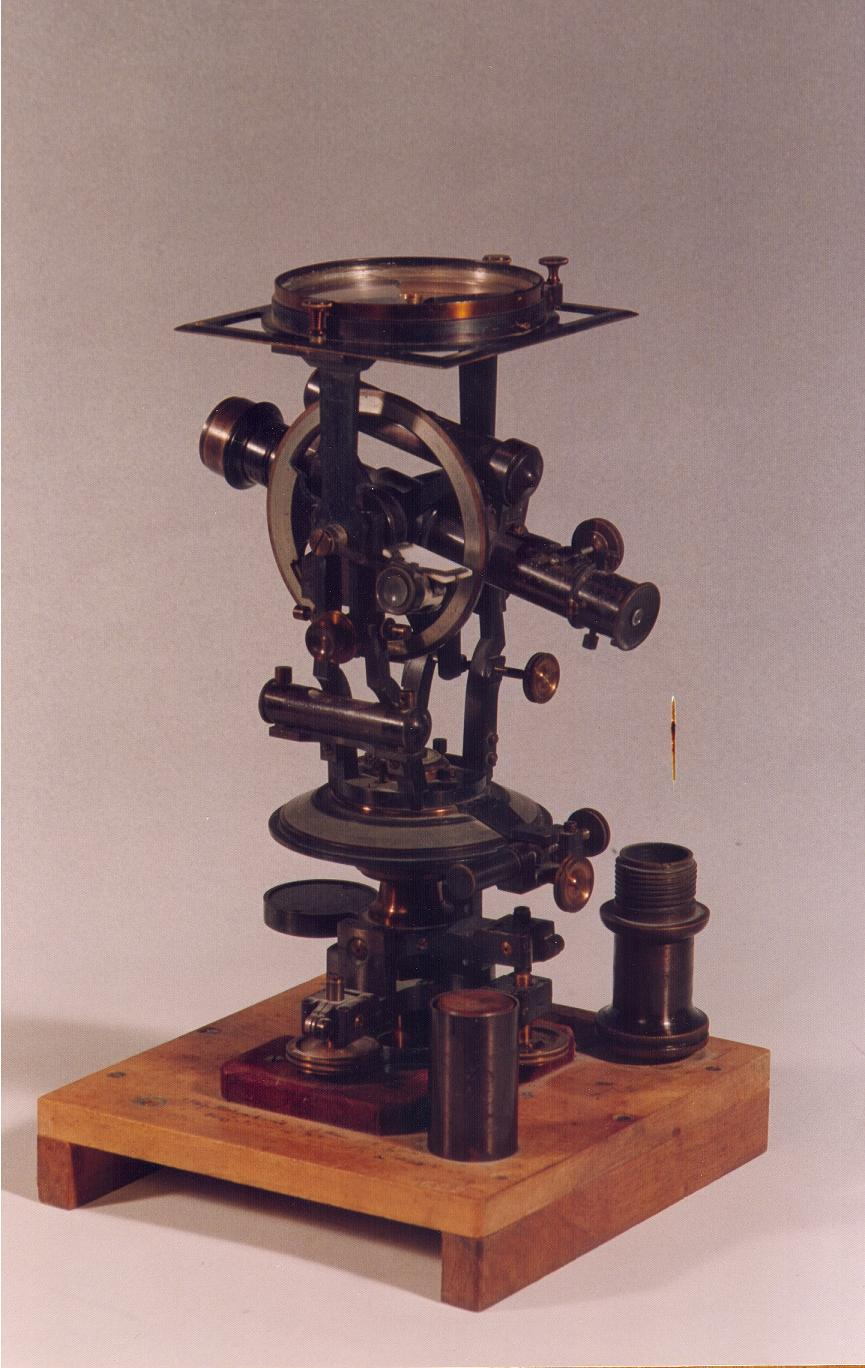
The theodolite used by Gottlieb Schumacher in the museum of the German Protestant Institute in Jerusalem

Gottlieb Schumacher (21 November 1857 – 26 November 1925) was an American-born civil engineer, architect and archaeologist of German descent, who was an important figure in the early archaeological exploration of Palestine.

== Early life ==
Schumacher was born in Zanesville, Ohio, where his parents had immigrated from Tübingen, Germany. His father, Jacob Schumacher, was a member of the Temple Society, a German Protestant sect which in the 1860s established the German Colony in Haifa, Palestine. In 1869, Jacob Schumacher settled with his family in the Templer colony, where he became the chief architect and builder.

== Career ==
=== Engineer, surveyor and architect ===
Gottlieb studied engineering in Germany, and then returned to Palestine in 1881.

He quickly became a leading figure in the construction of roads and houses. He was appointed Chief Engineer for the Province of Akko by the Ottoman government. Among his many works were the Scottish hostels in Safed and Tiberias, the Russian hostel in Nazareth, the cellars of the Rothschild winery at Rishon LeZion, and the bridge over the Kishon River.

One of his most important projects was the survey of the Golan, Hauran, and Ajlun districts, in preparation for the construction of the Damascus-Haifa railway, which branched off from the Hejaz railway at Deraa. As part of the same development he also extended the mole of the port of Haifa. In the course of this survey he produced the first accurate maps of these regions, along with detailed descriptions of the archaeological remains and the contemporary villages.

From 1886 he published articles reporting his discoveries in the Zeitschrift des Deutschen Palästina-Vereins. These articles were reprinted in translation by the Palestine Exploration Fund Quarterly Statement. He published a series of books, also reprinted in English by the Fund.

=== Archaeologist ===
==== Megiddo ====
From 1903 to 1905 Schumacher carried out excavations at Tell el-Mutesellim, the mound containing the ruins of the ancient city of Megiddo. The first volume of his report on Megiddo, covering the stratigraphy and the architecture, was published in 1908. The second volume, a study of the small finds, was published in 1929 by Carl Watzinger and contained the material which survived destruction during World War I.

Schumacher's approach to excavation was based more on architectural finds than on dissection of layers of earth. His reports were illustrated with many photographs and drawings.

His main excavated area at Megiddo was a trench 20–25 metres (66–82 ft) across, running north–south through the center of the mound, a method widely used in those days and influenced by Heinrich Schliemann's digs at Troy, but considered unfortunate by later archaeologist due to the very large amount of soil removed in a manner that offers little stratigraphic information to future researchers. The massive intervention in this relatively small tell led for instance to overlooking the potentially very important stele fragment of Pharaoh Sheshonk I, usually identified with biblical King Shishak, which was later found in the pile of dump created by Schumacher's trench, thus out of its original stratigraphic context and rendered almost useless for dating purposes. If found in situ, the stele would have provided chronological evidence about the city from the time of Sheshonk's campaign, related to the disputed historical existence of King Solomon (1 Kings 14:25; 2 Chronicles 12:1-12).

In the trench Schumacher identified eight strata, which he numbered from bottom to top. Most of them may be dated, by the pottery found in them, to the Middle Bronze Age II-Iron Age II periods. His work was the basis for later excavations by the Oriental Institute of the University of Chicago in 1925-1939.

Schumacher uncovered a number of important buildings at Megiddo.

- Part of the Early Bronze Age palace later fully uncovered in Stratum XII of the Chicago excavations.
- An Iron Age IIA palace on the south side of the tell (called building 1723 by the Chicago excavators), from which he recovered a seal with a beautifully depicted lion and the words "Shema servant of Jeroboam".
- Corbel vaulted tombs with no parallels in the southern Levant, in Stratum IV.

==== Khirbet ed-Dikke ====
Among his discoveries was the ancient synagogue at Khirbet Dikke.

== Last decades ==
With the outbreak of World War I, some members of the Templer community returned to Germany. Schumacher remained there until 1924, when he returned to his home on Mount Carmel near Haifa, where he died in 1925.

== Maps of Transjordan ==
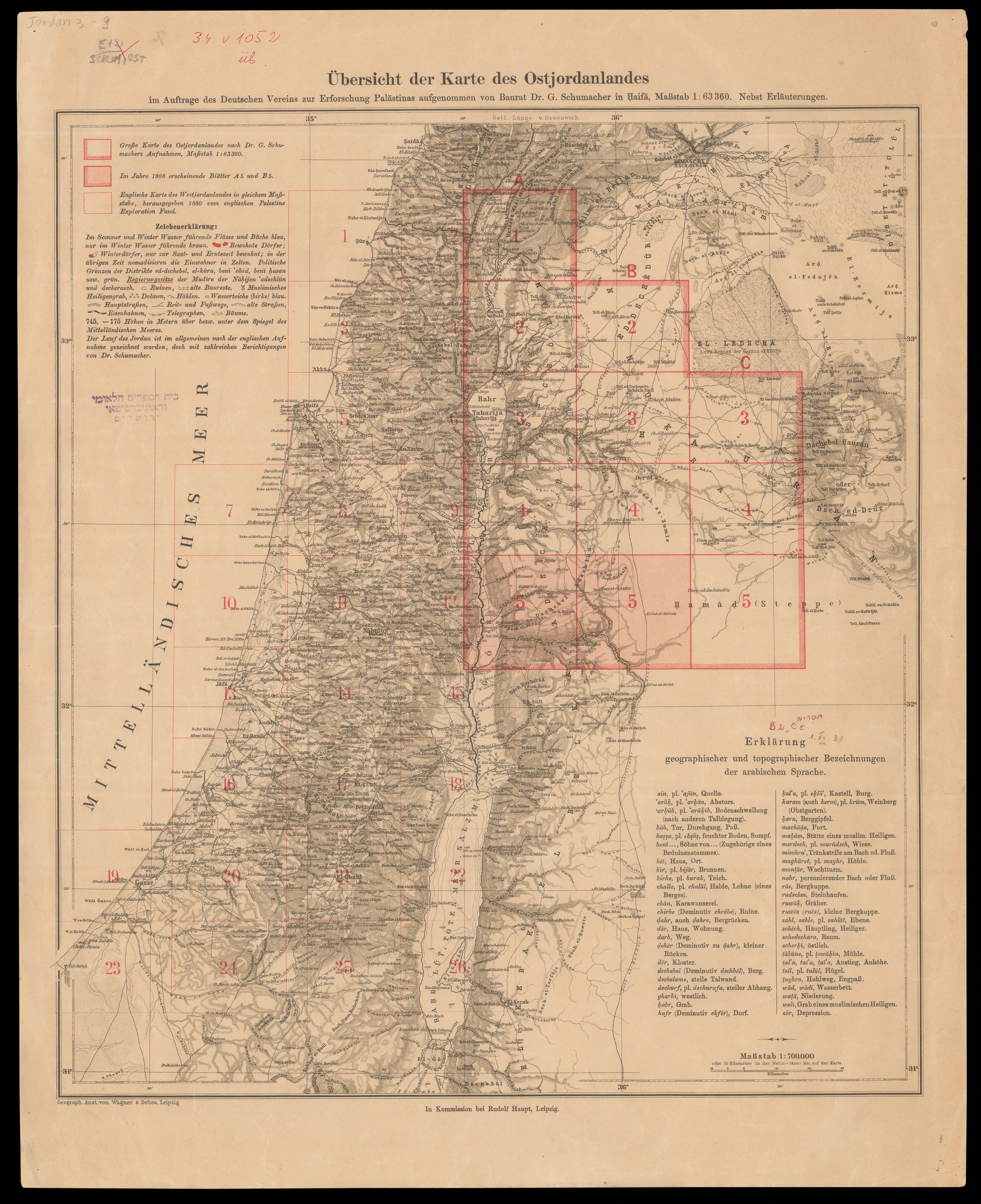
Key to Schumacher's maps of Transjordan and the Golan

Schumacher's maps of Transjordan and the Golan, prepared on behalf of the German Society for the Exploration of Palestine, were the first detailed maps of the area.

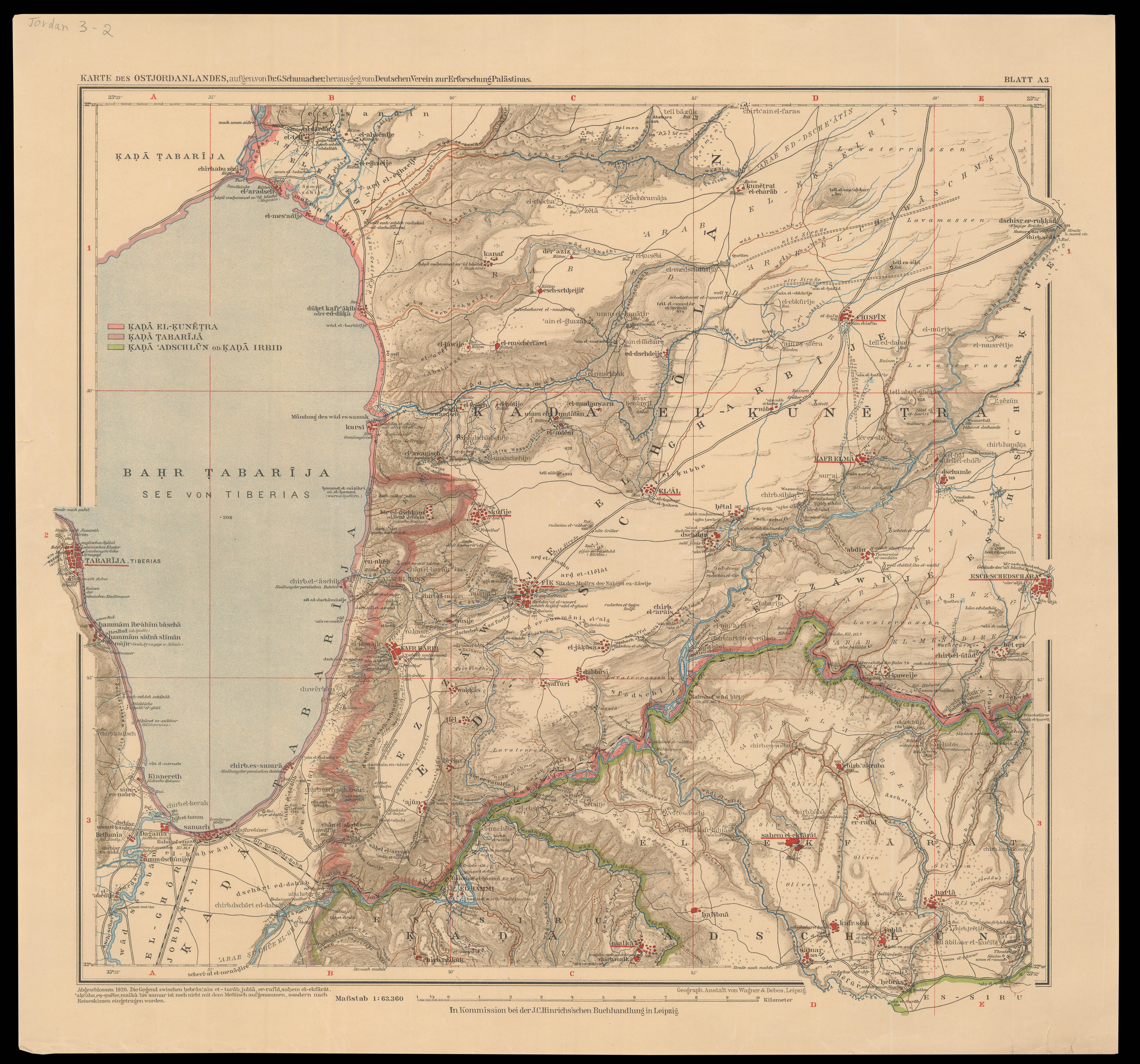
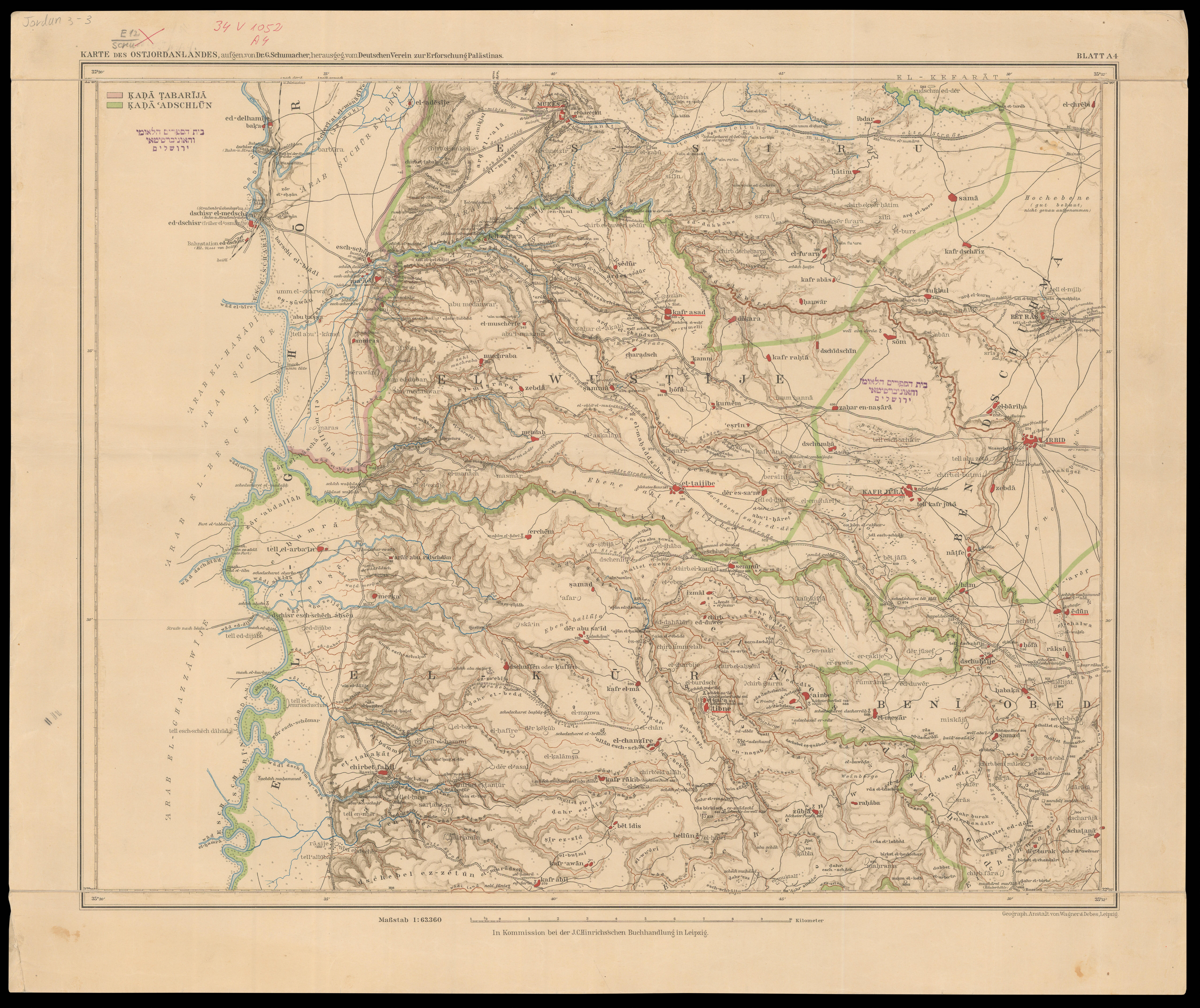
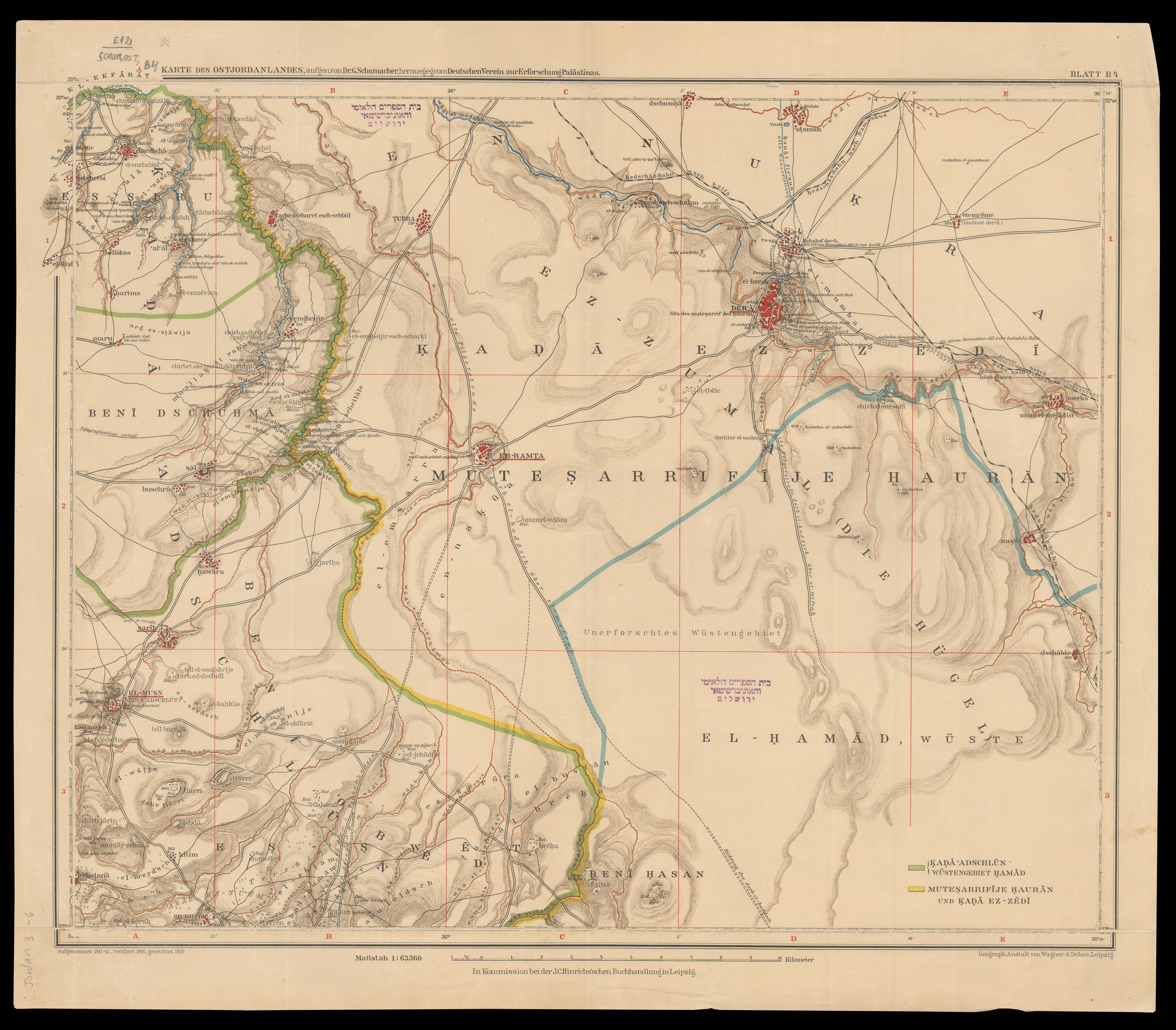
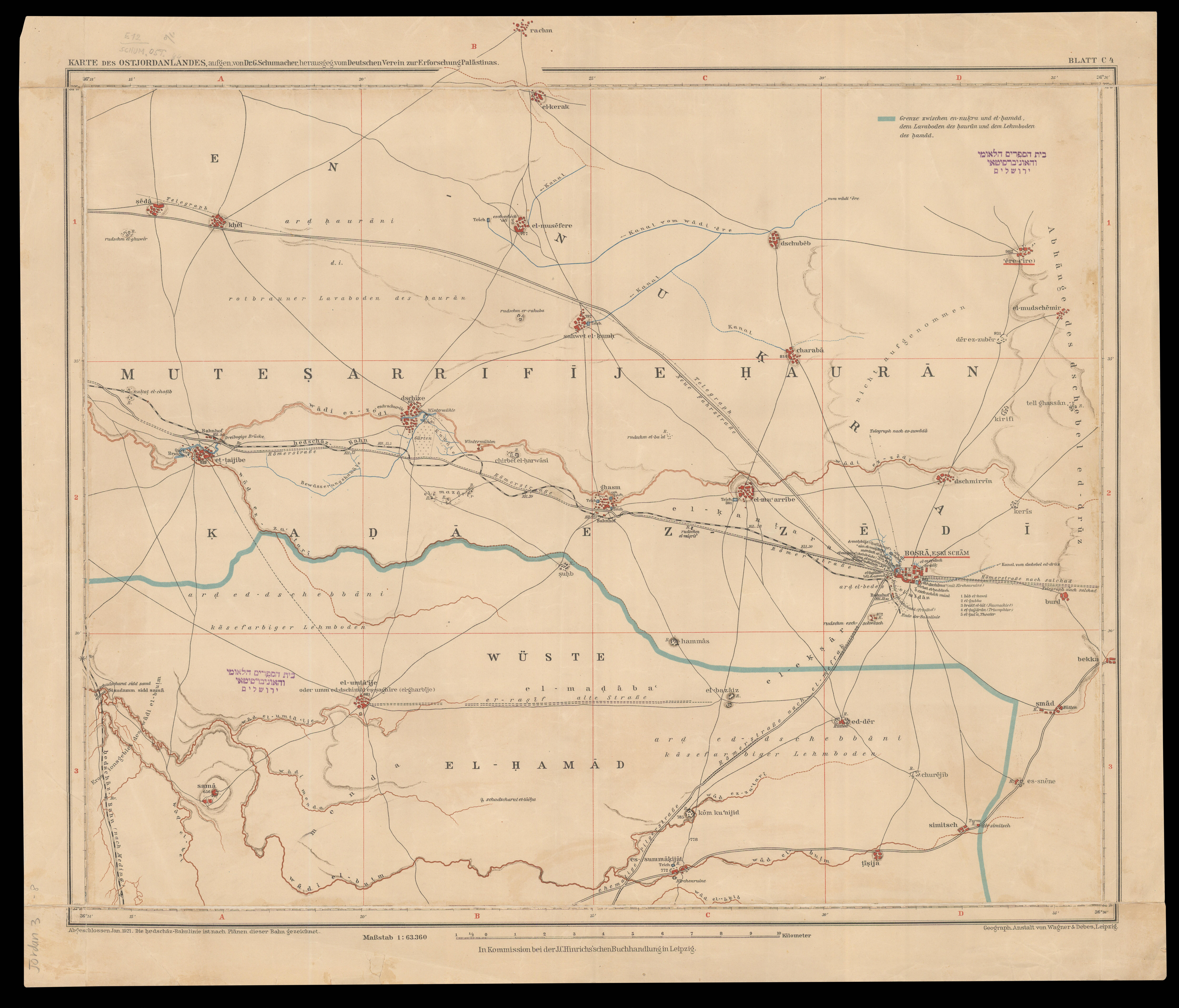
A	B	C
			1+2
			3
			4
			5
Each sheet is a separate clickable image.

== Legacy: the Gottlieb Schumacher Institute ==
The Gottlieb Schumacher Institute or Research of the Christian Presence in Palestine in the Modern Era (German: "Gottlieb-Schumacher-Institut zur Erforschung des christlichen Beitrags zum Wiederaufbau Palästinas im 19. Jahrhundert", lit. 'G.S.I. for the Research of the Christian Contribution to the Reconstruction of Palestine in the 19th Century'), is part of Haifa University and has its seat in the "Keller-Haus", once the home of F. Keller, a prominent member of the Templer community. It is located at 2, Keller Street in Haifa. The institute was established in 1987 by Alex Carmel. For more on the Keller House aka Beit Rachel ('Rachel House') see here.

== Bibliography ==
- Schumacher, G.; Oliphant, L.; Le Strange, G. (1886). Across the Jordan; being an exploration and survey of part of Hauran and Jaulan. New York: Scribner and Welford.
- Schumacher, G. (1888). "Population list of the Liwa of Akka". Quarterly Statement - Palestine Exploration Fund. 20: 169–191.
- Schumacher, Gottlieb (1888): The Jaulân: surveyed for the German Society for the Exploration of the Holy Land
- Schumacher, G.; Oliphant, L.; Le Strange, G. (1889). Across the Jordan; being an exploration and survey of part of Hauran and Jaulan. London: Watt.
- Schumacher; et al. (1897). "Der Südliche Basan". Zeitschrift des Deutschen Palästina-Vereins. 19–20: 65–227.
- Schumacher, Gottlieb (1897). "Notes from Jedur". Quarterly Statement - Palestine Exploration Fund. 29 (3): 190–195. doi:10.1179/peq.1897.29.3.190.
- Schumacher, G. (1899). "Reports from Galilee". Quarterly Statement - Palestine Exploration Fund. 31 (4): 339–343. doi:10.1179/peq.1899.31.4.339.
- Schumacher, G. (1900). "Reports from Galilee". Quarterly Statement - Palestine Exploration Fund. 32 (4): 355–360. doi:10.1179/peq.1900.32.4.355.
- Schumacher, Gottlieb (1908). Steuernagel, Carl (ed.). Tell el-Mutesellim; Bericht über die 1903 bis 1905 mit Unterstützung Sr. Majestät des deutschen Kaisers und der Deutschen Orient-Gesellschaft vom Deutschen Verein zur Erforschung Palästinas veranstalteten Ausgrabungen. Vol. 1. Leipzig: J. C. Hinrichs'sche Buchhandlung.
  - English translation, by Mario Martin
- Schumacher, Gottlieb (1929). Watzinger, Carl (ed.). Tell el-Mutesellim; Bericht über die 1903 bis 1905 mit Unterstützung Sr. Majestät des deutschen Kaisers und der Deutschen Orient-Gesellschaft vom Deutschen Verein zur Erforschung Palästinas veranstalteten Ausgrabungen. Vol. 2. Leipzig: Rudolf Haupt.
