= Dan Urman =

Israeli archaeologist and historian (1945–2004)

- דן אורמן
- Born: 1945; Haifa, Mandatory Palestine
- Died: 14 March 2004 (aged 58–59); Beersheba, Israel

Academic background
- Education: Hebrew University of Jerusalem; New York University

Academic work
- Discipline: Archaeology, Jewish history
- Sub-discipline: Late antiquity, ancient synagogues, archaeology of the Golan Heights and Negev
- Institutions: Ben-Gurion University of the Negev
- Notable works: The Golan: A Profile of a Region During the Roman and Byzantine Periods (1985)

Dan Urman (Hebrew: דן אורמן; 1945 – 14 March 2004) was an Israeli archaeologist and historian specializing in the Golan Heights, the Roman and Byzantine periods, ancient Jewish communities and ancient synagogues. He taught at Ben-Gurion University of the Negev from 1979 until his death, with the rank of Associate Professor and serving periodically as chair of its Department of Jewish History.

Urman's principal archaeological projects included surveys and excavations in the Golan Heights after their occupation in 1967, work at the Byzantine monastery at Kursi, and renewed excavations at Nessana in the Negev. His publications included regional studies of the Golan, a major collection of inscriptions from the region, and a two-volume collection on the archaeology and history of ancient synagogues in the Levant. His survey of the former Syrian village of Rafid was published posthumously in 2006.

== Early life and education ==
Urman was born in Haifa in 1945. After completing compulsory military service in the IDF from 1963 to 1965, he studied history and archaeology at the Hebrew University of Jerusalem, earning his bachelor's degree in 1974 and master's degree in 1976.

He pursued doctoral studies at New York University. His dissertation, completed in 1979, examined the Golan during the Roman and Byzantine periods and was later published as The Golan: A Profile of a Region During the Roman and Byzantine Periods in the British Archaeological Reports International Series in 1985.

In 1979 Urman joined the faculty of Ben-Gurion University of the Negev, where he held appointments in Jewish history and in Bible, archaeology and Ancient Near Eastern studies. He later became an associate professor and periodically chaired the Department of Jewish History.

== Archaeological work ==
=== Abandoned villages and the Golan Heights ===
Between 1965 and 1968, Urman participated in surveys of archaeological remains in Palestinian villages depopulated during the 1948 war. These surveys formed part of a wider program in which the Israel Archaeological Survey Society examined abandoned villages before the demolition of surviving buildings. Historian Aron Shai has argued that the archaeological survey organization becameinstitutionally involved in a state program for the clearance of deserted villages during the second half of the 1960s.

Following the Six-Day War of 1967, Urman was appointed the staff officer responsible for antiquities in the Israeli-controlled Golan Heights, where he surveyed archaeological sites and conducted salvage excavations. Shai, on the basis of contemporary administrative records, gives Urman's official title during this work as "Head of Surveying and Demolition Supervision for the Golan Heights". According to Shai, Urman submitted to his superiors a list of 127 abandoned Syrian villages proposed for demolition as archaeological surveying and demolition operations were expanded to the newly occupied Golan.

At the same time, Urman undertook extensive archaeological documentation of the region. His early field reports appeared in Hadashot Arkheologiyot, and he participated with Amihai Mazar, Amos Kloner, Zvi Ilan and Gabriel Barkay in research on archaeological remains in the northern Bashan.

Urman's doctoral research synthesized the results of this work into a regional study of settlement in the Golan during the Roman and Byzantine periods. The resulting monograph, published in 1985, was subsequently reviewed in the American Journal of Archaeology.

=== Kursi ===
In 1970 and 1971 Urman directed archaeological work at Kursi, on the eastern shore of the Sea of Galilee. He subsequently co-directed systematic excavations there with archaeologist Vassilios Tzaferis. The excavations exposed a large Byzantine Christian monastic complex associated by Christian tradition with the Miracle of the Swine.

=== Rafid ===
One of Urman's principal Golan projects was the survey of Rafid, a Syrian village containing extensive ancient architectural remains. Between 1968 and 1970, Urman and his team measured and photographed the village's buildings and produced a detailed plan recording houses, lanes, public spaces and water installations.

Urman regarded the architectural documentation at Rafid as an important component of the Golan survey because many of the village buildings incorporated decorated basalt architectural elements originating in ancient structures. He had not completed the final publication at the time of his death. His colleagues Shimon Dar, Moshe Hartal and Etan Ayalon subsequently prepared the manuscript for publication, and Rafid on the Golan: A Profile of a Late Roman and Byzantine Village appeared posthumously in 2006.

=== Nessana ===
From 1987 Urman directed renewed excavations at the Byzantine and early Islamic settlement of Nessana in the Negev, on behalf of Ben-Gurion University. J. Shereshevski co-directed the excavations between 1987 and 1991, and Dennis E. Groh participated in their direction in the early 1990s.

The expedition opened excavation areas in both the upper and lower parts of the settlement and investigated domestic buildings, public structures, churches and monastic remains. Among the structures documented in the renewed excavations were a monumental stairway leading toward the Byzantine fort and previously unknown ecclesiastical structures.

Urman edited the first volume of the excavation report, Nessana: Excavations and Studies, which appeared in 2004. Later archaeological research at Nessana has continued to use the results and material from Urman's expedition.

== Research on the Golan and ancient synagogues ==
A substantial part of Urman's scholarship concerned the population, religious communities and settlement archaeology of the Golan in late antiquity. His 1985 monograph The Golan surveyed archaeological evidence for the region during the Roman and Byzantine periods.

Urman later worked with Robert C. Gregg on the epigraphic evidence from the Golan. Their 1996 book, Jews, Pagans and Christians in the Golan Heights: Greek and Other Inscriptions of the Roman and Byzantine Eras, assembled and analyzed inscriptions from settlements across the region. Gregg later stated that the corpus consisted principally of 241 Greek inscriptions, alongside inscriptions in Hebrew, Aramaic and Latin, and that the material served as a basis for reconstructing Jewish, polytheist and Christian settlement patterns in the ancient Golan. The book was reviewed by classical historian Werner Eck in Scripta Classica Israelica.

Urman was also closely associated with research on ancient synagogues. With Paul V. M. Flesher he edited the two-volume Ancient Synagogues: Historical Analysis and Archaeological Discovery, published by Brill in 1995. The collection brought together archaeological, historical and inscription-related studies of ancient synagogues in Palestine and elsewhere in the ancient Jewish world. The work was reviewed by archaeologist James F. Strange in the Journal of Biblical Literature.

Urman's own contribution to the collection presented evidence for Jewish communities and public structures at dozens of sites in the Golan. His work on the region has continued to be cited in later studies of Jewish archaeology and religious communities in late antiquity.

== Scholarly reception and legacy ==
Urman died of leukemia in Beersheba on 14 March 2004. At the time of his death, several of his archaeological projects remained incompletely published. The first volume of the Nessana excavation reports appeared in 2004, while his study of Rafid was completed by colleagues and published posthumously in 2006.

Urman's publications received attention in specialist archaeological, historical and epigraphic scholarship. His 1985 monograph, The Golan: A Profile of a Region during the Roman and Byzantine Periods, was reviewed by archaeologist Claudine Dauphin in the American Journal of Archaeology. His work on ancient synagogues attracted reviews in several specialist journals. The two-volume Ancient Synagogues: Historical Analysis and Archaeological Discovery, which he edited with Paul V. M. Flesher, was reviewed by Jodi Magness in the Journal of the American Oriental Society, James F. Strange in the Journal of Biblical Literature, and Joseph Patrich in Qadmoniot.

The epigraphic corpus Jews, Pagans and Christians in the Golan Heights, co-authored with Robert C. Gregg, likewise received independent scholarly reviews. Byzantine epigrapher Denis Feissel reviewed the work in the Revue des études byzantines, while Roman historian Werner Eck devoted a separate review to it in Scripta Classica Israelica. The volume assembled Greek, Hebrew, Aramaic and Latin inscriptions as evidence for the religious and social history of the Golan during the Roman and Byzantine periods, and has continued to be used in subsequent studies of the region's Jewish, Christian and polytheist communities.

Urman's excavations at Nessana have also remained part of subsequent archaeological research at the site. Recent scholarship distinguishes two principal twentieth-century excavation campaigns at Nessana: the British expedition of 1935–1937 and the Ben-Gurion University expedition directed by Urman and J. Shereshevski from 1987 into the 1990s. The latter expanded investigation from the acropolis into the upper and lower town and uncovered private and public buildings, including a church and monastery. The renewed Nessana Archaeological Project, begun in 2022, has returned to material and questions raised by the earlier campaigns and cites Urman's 2004 excavation publication among the principal reports for the site. The later researchers have also noted a limitation of Urman's archaeological legacy: much of the material from the Ben-Gurion expedition remained unpublished after the deaths of its directors, requiring the finds and stratigraphic evidence to be reassessed alongside the results of renewed excavation.

== Selected publications ==
- Urman, Dan (1985). The Golan: A Profile of a Region During the Roman and Byzantine Periods. BAR International Series. Vol. 269. Oxford: British Archaeological Reports. ISBN 9780860543428.
- Urman, Dan; Flesher, Paul V. M., eds. (1995). Ancient Synagogues: Historical Analysis and Archaeological Discovery. Studia Post-Biblica. Vol. 47. Leiden: Brill.
- Gregg, Robert C.; Urman, Dan (1996). Jews, Pagans and Christians in the Golan Heights: Greek and Other Inscriptions of the Roman and Byzantine Eras. Atlanta: Scholars Press. ISBN 9780788503146.
- Urman, Dan, ed. (2004). Nessana: Excavations and Studies. Beer-Sheva. Vol. 17. Beersheba: Ben-Gurion University of the Negev Press.
- Urman, Dan (2006). Dar, Shimon; Hartal, Moshe; Ayalon, Etan (eds.). Rafid on the Golan: A Profile of a Late Roman and Byzantine Village. BAR International Series. Vol. 1555. Oxford: Archaeopress. ISBN 9781841719849.
