= Exorcism of the Gerasene demoniac =

Miracle performed by Jesus

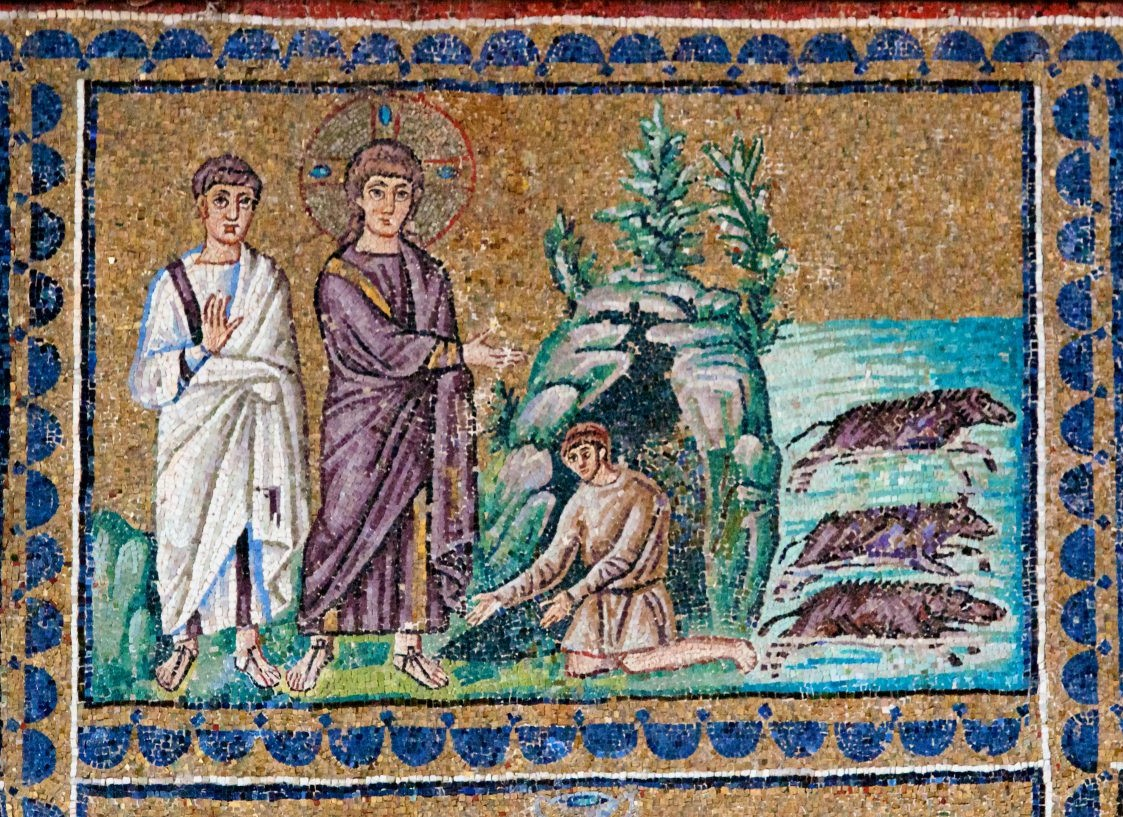
Mosaic of the exorcism of the Gerasene demoniac from the Basilica of Sant'Apollinare Nuovo in Ravenna, dating to the sixth century AD

The exorcism of the Gerasene demoniac (Matthew 8:28–34; Mark 5:1–20; Luke 8:26–39), frequently known as the miracle of the (Gadarene) swine and the exorcism of Legion, is one of the miracles performed by Jesus according to the New Testament. The story shows Jesus exorcising a demon or demons out of a man and into a herd of swine, causing the swine to run down a hill into a lake and drown themselves. The man whom Jesus heals is also specifically mentioned to be a Gentile in Mark's gospel, and he was commanded to proclaim the Gospel to the Gentile residents of the Decapolis following his exorcism. Many scholars and theologians thus count him as Jesus's first Apostle to the Gentiles.

The story appears in the three Synoptic Gospels, but not the Gospel of John. All accounts involve Jesus exorcising demons, identified collectively in Mark and Luke as "Legion".

The story was interpreted by Saints Augustine of Hippo and Thomas Aquinas to mean that Christians have no duties to animals. It has been a point of contention in discussions of Christianity and animal rights.

The exact location of the miracle is a matter of dispute, with the Gospels themselves only indicating a general area where the miracle took place. There are also multiple archaeological sites and state parks in both Israel and Jordan which claim to be the location of the miracle.

== Narratives ==
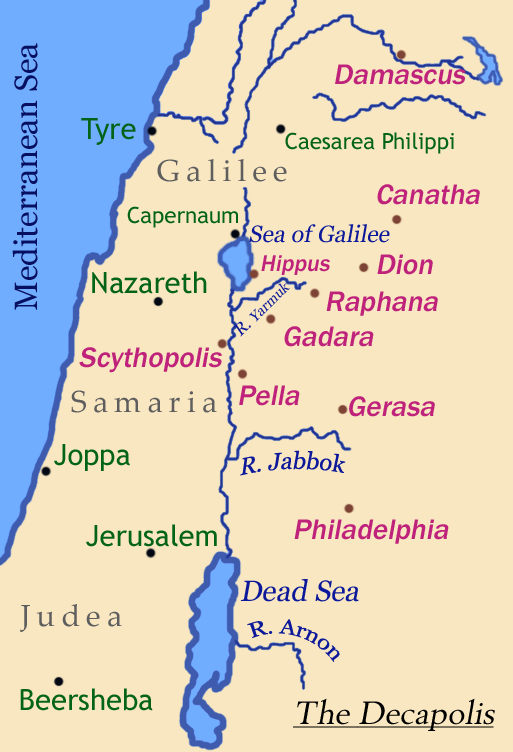
Map of Decapolis showing location of Gadara and Gerasa

=== Mark ===
The Gospel of Mark (Mark 5:1–20) provides the earliest accounts. Jesus goes across the sea into the "region of the Gerasenes". (Note: Other textual variations include "Gadarenes" and "Gergesenes".) There, a man "possessed by a demon" comes from the caves to meet him. People had tried to tie him down but he was too strong to be bound, even with chains, for he would always break out of them; night and day among the tombs and in the hills he would cry out and cut himself with stones. Jesus approaches and calls the demon to come out of the man, who replies "What do you want with me, Jesus, Son of the Most High God? I beg you in the name of God never to torment me!". Jesus asks the demon for his name and is told "My name is Legion, for we are many". The demons beg Jesus not to send them away, but instead to send them into the pigs on a nearby hillside, which he does. The herd, about two thousand in number, rush down the steep bank into the sea and are drowned. The man is now seen, dressed and restored to sanity: he asks to be included among the disciples who travel with Jesus, but he is refused and instructed to remain in the Decapolis region, to tell of "the great things the Lord has done ... and [how He] has had compassion on you". Theologian Tom Wright calls him "the first apostle to the gentiles".

=== Matthew ===
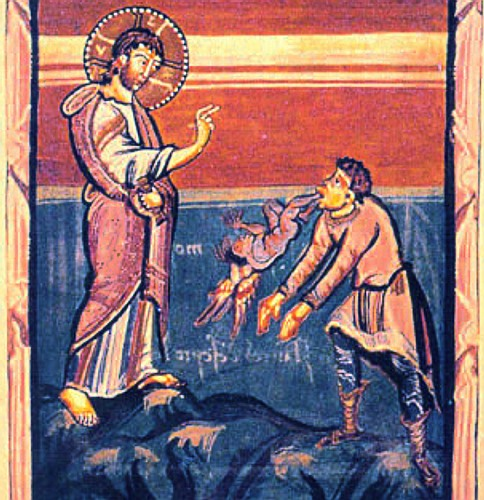
Jesus exorcising the Gerasene demoniac, from the Hitda Codex manuscript

Michael Licona observes that the Gospel of Matthew shortens the story dramatically (Matthew 8:28–34), as it frequently abbreviates stories from Mark, and writes of two men. The gospel treats its sources more conservatively than other ancient historians like Diodorus Siculus, though the variations in the Synoptics are typical of ancient historical biographies. The individual possessed by Legion is not the same individual as the second possessed man, who is possessed by a different demon. In this version, Jesus does not ask for the demon's name, which is considered an important element of traditional exorcism practice.

The location is also changed to the region of the "Gadarenes" (Gadara) as in most Bible translations. The King James Version in (Matthew 8:28) has the location as "Gergesenes" which corresponds to the modern Kursi, although this identification is disputed since Gergasa is not known to have existed prior to late antiquity nor does it appear in early manuscripts.

=== Luke ===
The Gospel of Luke's version (Luke 8:26–39) is shorter than Mark's, but agrees with most of its details. One detail that is unique to Luke's version is a reference to both the demoniac's nakedness and his subsequent clothing. At Luke 8:27, the gospel writer notes that the demoniac wore no clothes. Then he notes that he "was clothed and in his own mind" (Luke 8:35). Clothing is an important prop in the Lucan narrative (see Biblical clothing), which in this scene portrays the demoniac's development from his animal-like state to his restoration as a human being. Initially, the possessed man has been expelled from the human race—that is, he is no better off than an animal without clothing—but, after his exorcism, his humanity is fully restored and he rejoins the human race, "clothed and in his right mind" (Luke 8:35).

== Commentary ==
=== Gerasa, Gadara, or Gergesa? ===
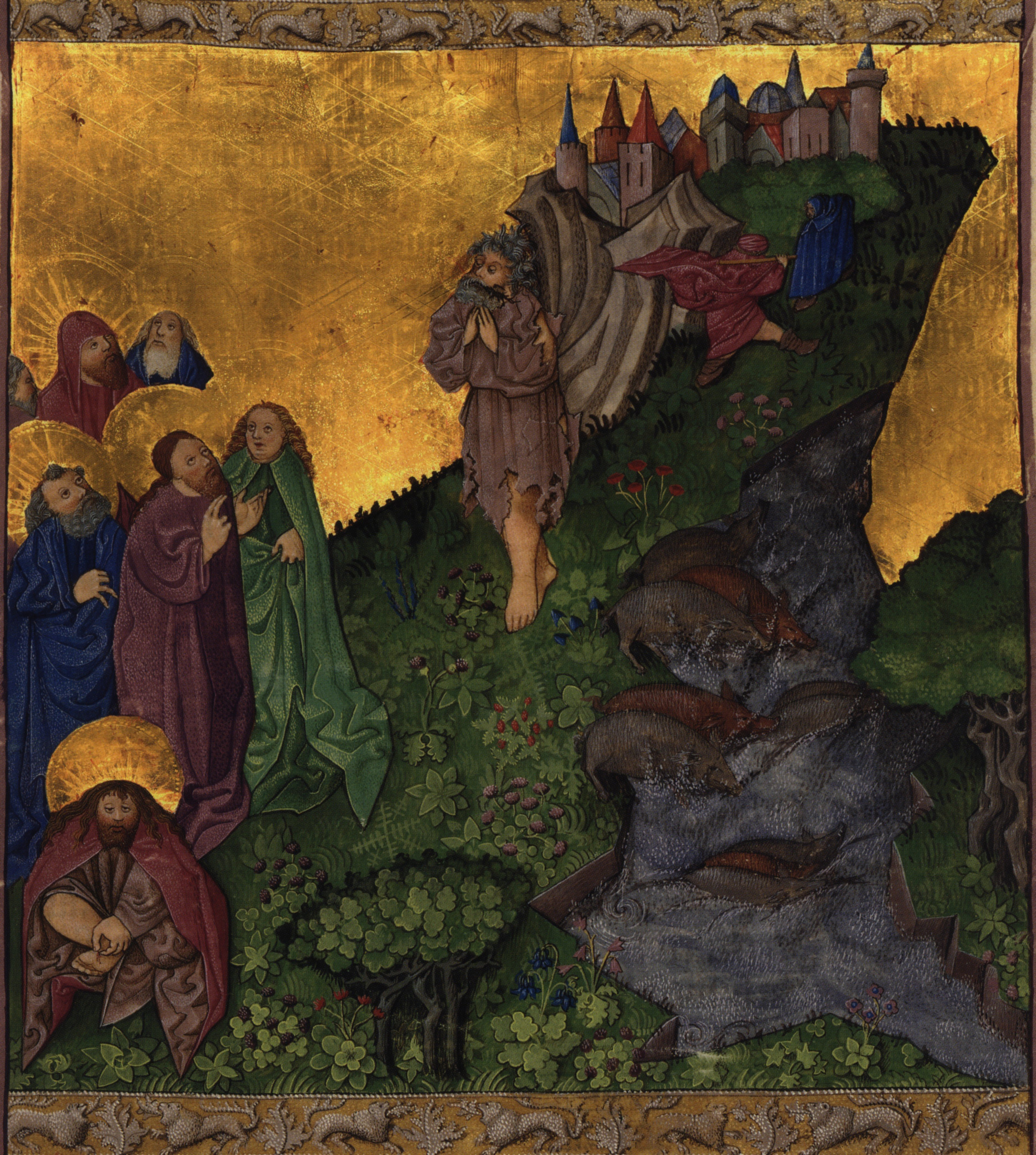
Medieval illumination of Jesus exorcizing the Gerasene demoniac from the Ottheinrich Folio

The story appears to be set close to the Sea of Galilee, since it takes place as soon as Jesus gets out of the boat, but neither Gadara nor Gerasa is on the shore itself. Both cities are southeast of the lake. Gadara is 10 kilometres (6.2 mi) away or a two-hour walking distance, and Gerasa well over twice as far. Origen cited a local tradition that there had been a town called "Gergasa" on the lake shore.

The differing geographical references to Gadara and Gerasa can be understood in light of the social, economic, and political influence each city exerted over the region. In this light, Matthew identified the exorcism with the local center of power, Gadara, located about 10 kilometres (6.2 mi) southeast of Sea of Galilee, whereas Mark identified the event with the regional center of power, Gerasa, located further inland. The city of Gerasa had been a major urban center since its founding, and during the Roman period it was the more widely known among the ten-city league known as the Decapolis. Both cities were part of the Decapolis.

Others contend that the miracle took place near the archaeological site and national park located in Kursi, also known as El-Koursi in Arabic, identifying the site with the alleged city of Gergesa mentioned by Origen. Kursi, which is located within the Golan Heights, houses both a 5th-century Byzantine monastery claiming to be the location of the event as well as a national park maintained by the State of Israel. There is also evidence of a later Jewish presence in the area, with remnants of a Byzantine era synagogue being discovered in 2015.

Of the possible locations, this location is one of two that falls within the modern political boundaries of Israel, although Israel's Annexation of the Golan Heights is not universally recognized. Historically, the cities of the Decapolis were outside of the territory of Roman province of Judaea and had a minimal Jewish presence during the time period of Jesus's ministry.

Most texts dating from before Origen refer to the area as the Land of the Gadarenes, leading many to believe that the location's identification with Gergasa in later texts and popular imagination to be a later corruption. The Land of the Gadarenes is also the terminology used in the Peshitta, which a minority of scholars as well as many Syriac churches claim to be the original Gospel that was later translated into Greek.

Some modern scholars have also speculated that Hippos (Golan Heights), located within Israel's pre-1967 borders could be a potential location for the exorcism due to its proximity to the coast of the Sea of Galilee.

The Biblical texts themselves do not mention a specific city in and of itself, only a general area, using terms such as "the region of" and "the land of". The rural scenery combined with the fact that tombs were generally located outside of a city due to superstitions regarding ritual impurity indicate that the most probable location was in a rural area that did not belong to any existing city proper. In any event, all of these possible locations are located within the territory of the Decapolis on the eastern side of the Sea of Galilee.

=== Naming, and use of singular and plural ===
The revealing of the demon's name has parallels with other examples in Jewish exorcism lore in the Second Temple period.

=== Allusions to the Book of Isaiah ===
There is a tenuous connection between the story and Isaiah 65:4:

"A people who ... sit among the graves, and spend the night in the tombs;
Who eat swine's flesh, and the broth of abominable things is in their vessel".

=== Animal rights ===
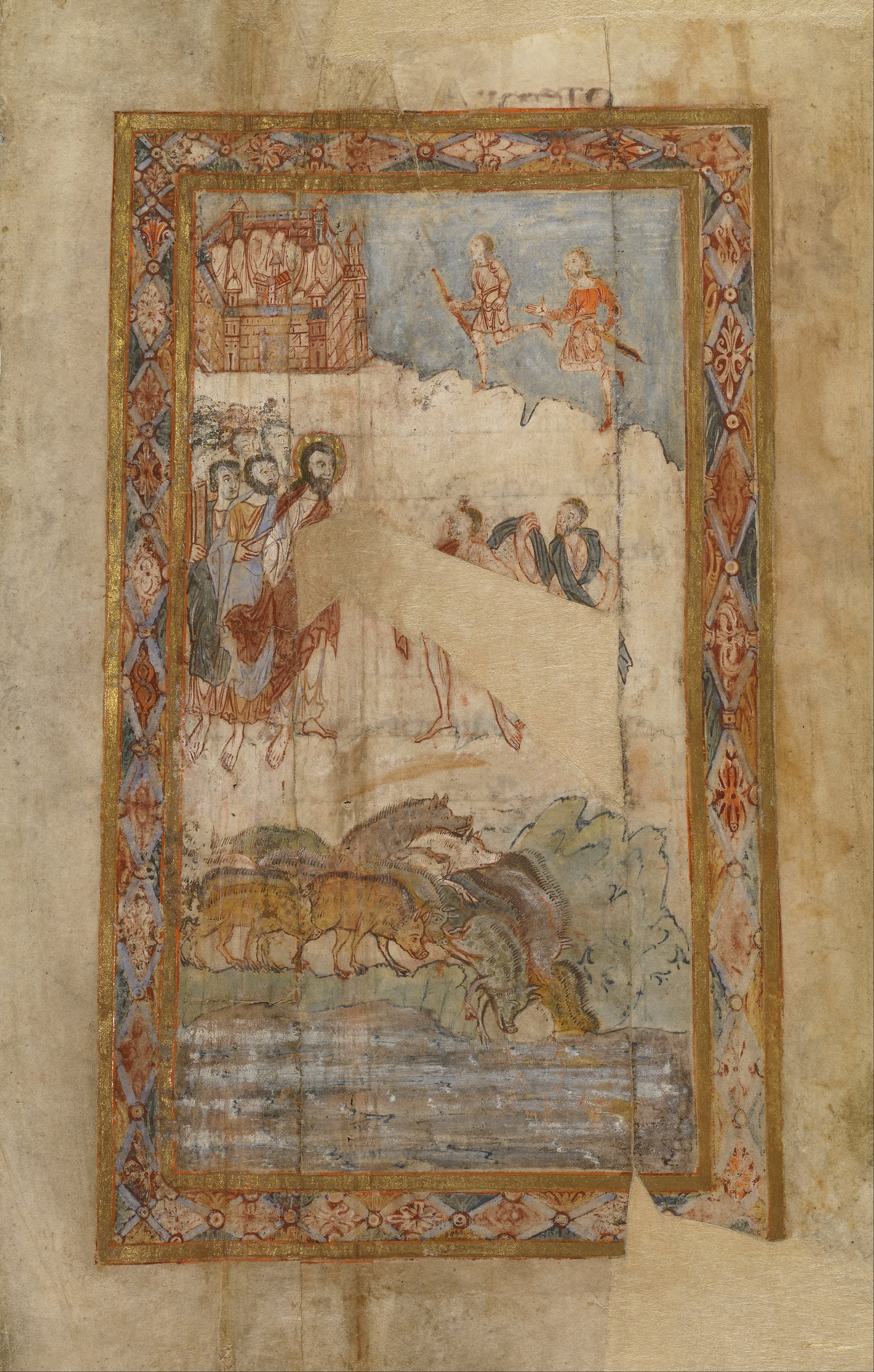
An illustration of the story from c. 1000, showing the swine drowning themselves

Classical theological commentary cited this story to argue that animals have no moral importance in Christianity. Saint Augustine of Hippo concluded from the story that Christians have no duties towards animals, writing:

Christ himself shows that to refrain from the killing of animals and the destroying of plants is the height of superstition, for judging that there are no common rights between us and the beasts and trees, he sent the devils into a herd of swine and with a curse withered the tree on which he found no fruit.

Similarly, Thomas Aquinas argued that Jesus allowed the demons to destroy the pigs in order to make the point that his purpose was primarily for the good of men's souls, not their bodies or property (including their animals). This interpretation has been shared by a long line of commentators up to the present day, including I. Howard Marshall and Mark Driscoll. However, other commentators have attempted to make the story consistent with a Jesus who shows "care and concern for animals", as John Austin Baker wrote. Such alternative readings include arguments that the swine were meant to represent the Roman army or "unclean and unfaithful" people because pigs were considered "unclean" for the Jews in this image, and the loss of these animals was not dangerous. And that Jesus did not actually "send" the devils into the pigs, He merely allowed the demons to go where they themselves chose to go.

=== René Girard's Scapegoat Theory ===
This episode plays a key role in the literary critic René Girard's theory of the Scapegoat. In his analysis, the opposition of the entire city to the one man possessed by demons is the typical template for a scapegoat. Girard notes that, in the demoniac's self-mutilation, he seems to imitate the stoning that the local villagers would likely have attempted to use against him to cast him out of their society, while the villagers themselves show by their reaction to Jesus that they are not primarily concerned with the good of the man possessed by demons:

Notice the mimetic character of this behavior. As if he is trying to avoid being expelled and stoned in reality, the possessed brings about his own expulsion and stoning; he provides a spectacular mime of all the stages of punishment that Middle Eastern societies inflict on criminals whom they consider completely defiled and irredeemable. First, the man is hunted, then stoned, and finally he is killed; this is why the possessed lived among the tombs. The Gerasenes must have had some understanding of why they are reproached or they would not respond as they do. Their mitigated violence is an ineffective protest. Their answer is: 'No, we do not want to stone you because we want to keep you near us. No ostracism hangs over you.' Unfortunately, like anyone who feels wrongfully yet feasibly accused, the Gerasenes protest violently, they protest their good faith with violence, thereby reinforcing the terror of the possessed. Proof of their awareness of their own contradiction lies in the fact that the chains are never strong enough to convince their victim of their good intentions toward him."

On Girard's account, then, the uneasy truce that the Gaderenes and the demoniac had worked out was that the evil power in him was contained and thereby neutralized. Jesus's arrival on the scene introduced a spiritual power stronger than Legion, which upset the social balance by removing the scapegoat. This reversal of the scapegoat mechanism by Jesus is central to Girard's entire reading of Christianity, and this reversal is on display in this story as well. Contrasting the self-destruction of the herd of pigs with the typical motif of an individual evil-doer being pushed over a cliff by an undifferentiated mob (cf. Luke 4:29), Girard comments:

But in these cases, it is not the scapegoat who goes over the cliff, neither is it a single victim nor a small number of victims, but a whole crowd of demons, two thousand swine possessed by demons. Normal relationships are reversed. The crowd should remain on top of the cliff and the victim fall over; instead, in this case, the crowd plunges and the victim is saved. The miracle of Gerasa reverses the universal schema of violence fundamental to all societies of the world.

=== Roman sexual conquest ===
According to Warren Carter, the story contains "military language" that alludes to Roman imperialist practices, which were often sexual in nature. For example, when the demonic Legion requests to "enter" the pigs, they are actually requesting to rape them, which is a possible reading according to Koine Greek. Pigs were symbolic of either women or soldiers of the Tenth Fretensis legion, who had boars on their emblems. Thus, Jesus becomes the "manly" military commander that emasculates Romans when he accepts their request. But Jesus allows the Legion and their pig victims to drown to prove that Romans were inherently self-destructive like Egyptians, who drowned when they chased the Israelites during the Exodus narrative.

=== Dostoevsky, Demons ===
The story inspired the title of, and is used as the second epigraph to, Fyodor Dostoevsky's 1871–72 novel Demons.

== Archaeological sites and museums ==
There are a number of archaeological sites, state parks and museums associated with the event.

Historically, the areas associated the miracle were all located outside of Judaea in the Gentile lands of the Decapolis, a Hellenized region that was home to a mixed Greek, Roman, Arab and Nabataean population.

The Gospel of Mark specifically mentions that both the demoniac and villagers were Gentiles. Likewise, there is no evidence of an organized Jewish presence in the area in antiquity, with the few Jews living in the area consisting of a handful of highly assimilated Jewish apostates. By the Byzantine era, however, there is evidence of Jewish synagogues and other organized Jewish activity in addition to Christian heritage sites.

In modern times, the majority of sites are located within the political boundaries of Jordan. Kursi is located within the portion of the Golan Heights that was annexed by Israel and is currently home to both a state park and a museum operated by the Israeli government. Another site, Hippos, is located within Israel's pre-1967 borders.

=== Jerash ===
Jerash is the location of Gerasa of the Decapolis. Another city known as Gerasa (Judaea) existed in antiquity, but was not associated with the Decapolis. Jerash is often known as the "Pompeii of the Middle East" and is one of the largest and best-preserved ancient cities in the world. The city also hosts the Jerash Festival, which is one of the largest festivals in the world. The Jerash Visitor Center and Jerash Archaeological Museum both house large amounts of ancient artifacts from the time of the exorcism.

=== Umm Qais ===
Umm Qais (Arabic: أم قيس, lit. 'Mother of Qais'), also known as Qays, is a town in northern Jordan. It is home to the ruins of the ancient Gadara. The site is divided into three main areas: the archaeological site (Gadara), the traditional village (Umm Qais), and the modern town of Umm Qais.

The city is home to numerous tourist sites and archaeological sites. In the modern era, there have been a number of archaeological digs conducted by international teams of archaeologists, and work continues to this day preserving the sites.

The Umm Qais Museum is located in at the site of the historic Acropolis of Gadara.

=== Kursi ===
The State of Israel operates a national park at the location of the archaeological site at Kursi (El-Koursi in Arabic). There has been a claim since late antiquity and the early medieval era that this is the location of the exorcism given that some manuscripts place the miracle as happening at a location known as Gergasa.

Kursi is speculated by some to be the city of Gergasa that is alleged to have existed by Origen. Although the site is located close to both Gerasa and Gedara, there is no evidence that either Kursi or a city known as Gerasa existed prior to the Byzantine era, nor was any such city a part of the Decapolis. Likewise, manuscripts referencing the exorcism's location at Gergasa do not appear until after the time of Origen. This has led some scholars to question the veracity of the site's claims, both historic and modern, and whether such a city even existed during the time of Jesus.

The ruins of a Byzantine monastery as well as many other Christian and Jewish artifacts from the Byzantine era have been found at the site, which is home to a large national park and tourist sites.

=== Golan Archaeological Museum ===
The Golan Archaeological Museum located within the portion of the Golan Heights under control of the State Of Israel houses a number of artifacts associated with both the monastery at Kursi as well as other Christian sites in the area. The museum is operated by the Israeli government.

=== Hippos ===
Some have connected the archaeological site at Hippos, located within the State of Israel's pre-1967 borders, with a number of incidents related to the ministry of Jesus, including the exorcism of the Gedaran demoniac.

Hippos was also a member of the league of 10 cities known as the Decapolis.

Unlike the other possible sites, Hippos was abandoned due to an earthquake in late antiquity. As such, it is not home to a significant modern population. However, it has been declared a protected area and does host a national park, with the University of Haifa overseeingmuch of its preservation efforts.

Most of the archaeological finds associated with Hippos are of non-Christian pagan origin, and the city did not begin to practice Christianity until almost the time of its abandonment.

== Proverbial use ==
The story is the origin of the English proverbial adjective Gadarene, meaning "involving or engaged in a headlong or potentially disastrous rush to do something".

== See also ==
- Collective consciousness
- Demons (Dostoevsky novel)
- Hive Mind – The conscious functions of Legion. This is a characterization of a single mind and consciousness shared by living multitudes, with each individual lacking a will of their own and serving as extensions of the single mind.
- Life of Jesus in the New Testament
- Miracles of Jesus
- Superorganism – A natural process similar to a collective consciousness in which multiple creatures of the same species act as one.
