= Kursi, Sea of Galilee =

Archaeological site on the Golan Heights

Kursi
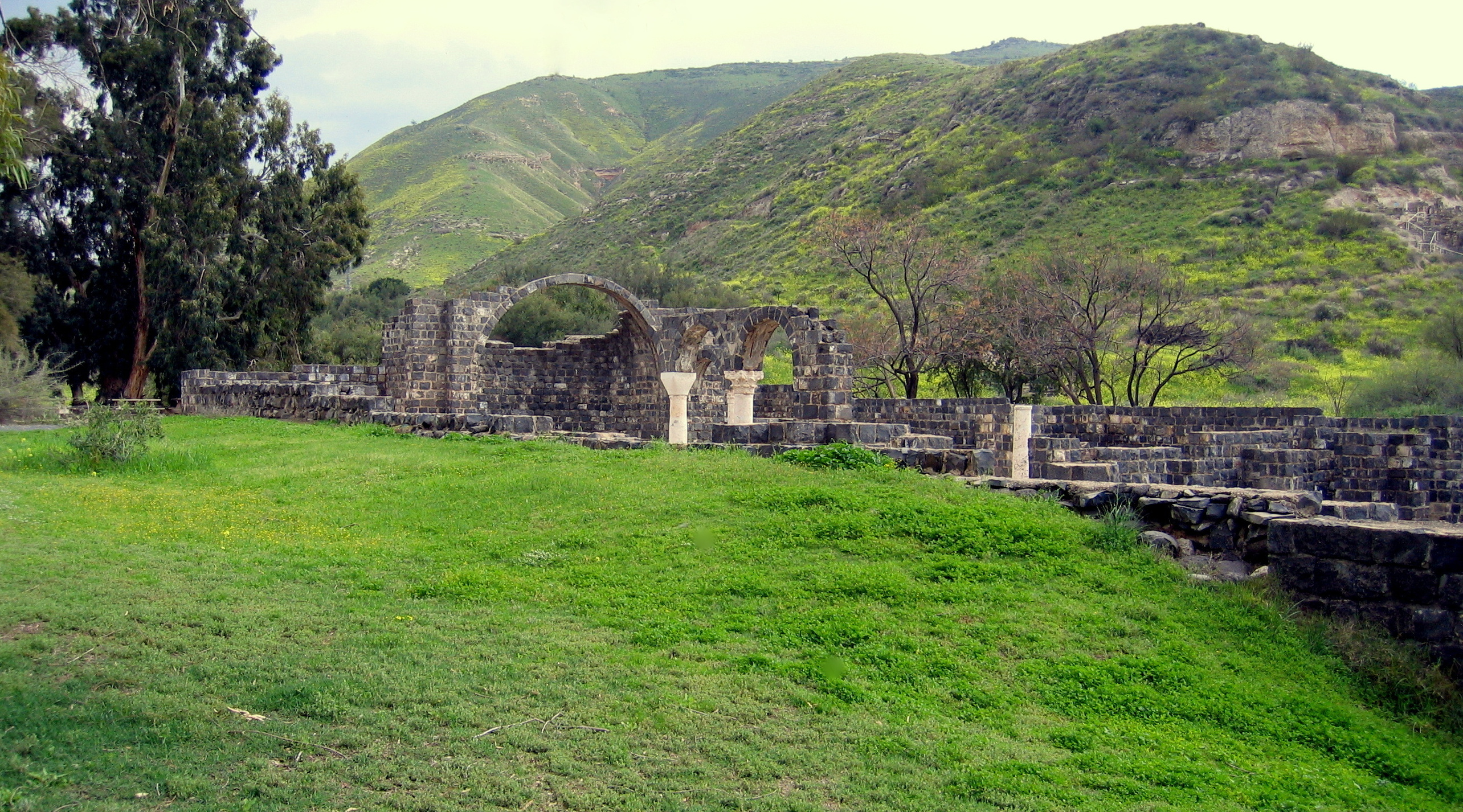

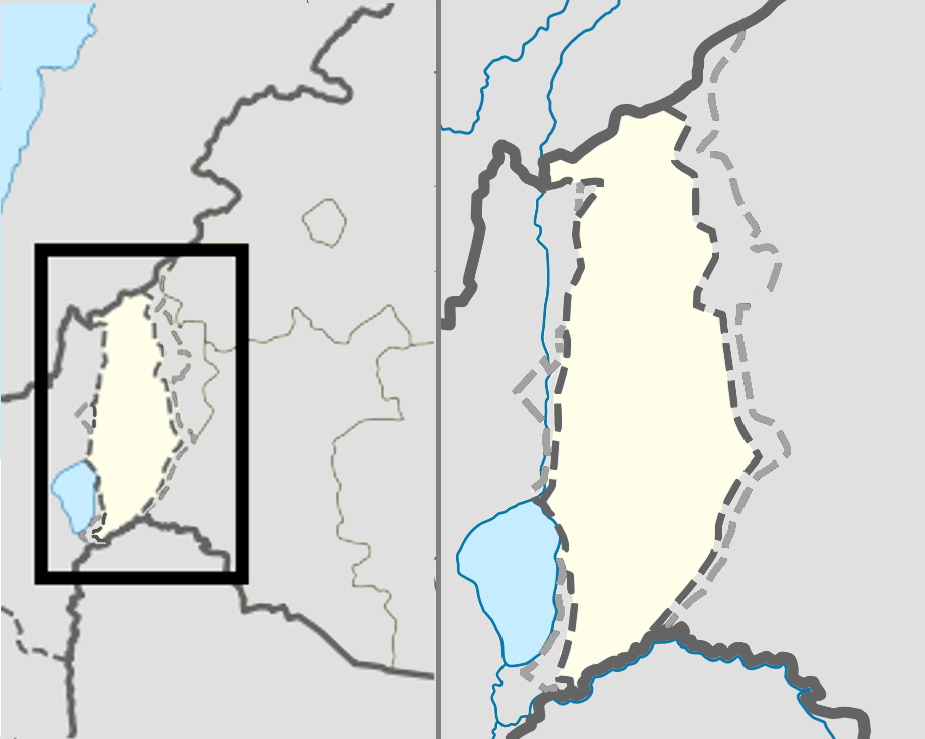
- Location within the Golan Heights
- 32°49′33.91″N 35°39′1.36″E
- Type: Settlement
- Region: Golan Heights

Kursi (Medieval Greek: Κυρσοί, Arabic: الكرسي, romanized: al-Kursī, Hebrew: כורסי) is an archaeological site in the Israeli-occupied Golan Heights of Syria. The site contains the remains of a Byzantine monastery and is traditionally identified as the location of Jesus' "Miracle of the Swine". Part of the archaeological site is now an Israeli national park. Kursi takes its name from the Talmudic site. A marble slab with Aramaic text discovered in December 2015 seems to indicate that the settlement had, as of c. 500 CE, a Jewish or Judeo-Christian population.

== Location ==
The site is located near the eastern shore of the Sea of Galilee on the bank of a wadi, Nahal Samakh, descending from the Golan Heights.

== Christian significance ==
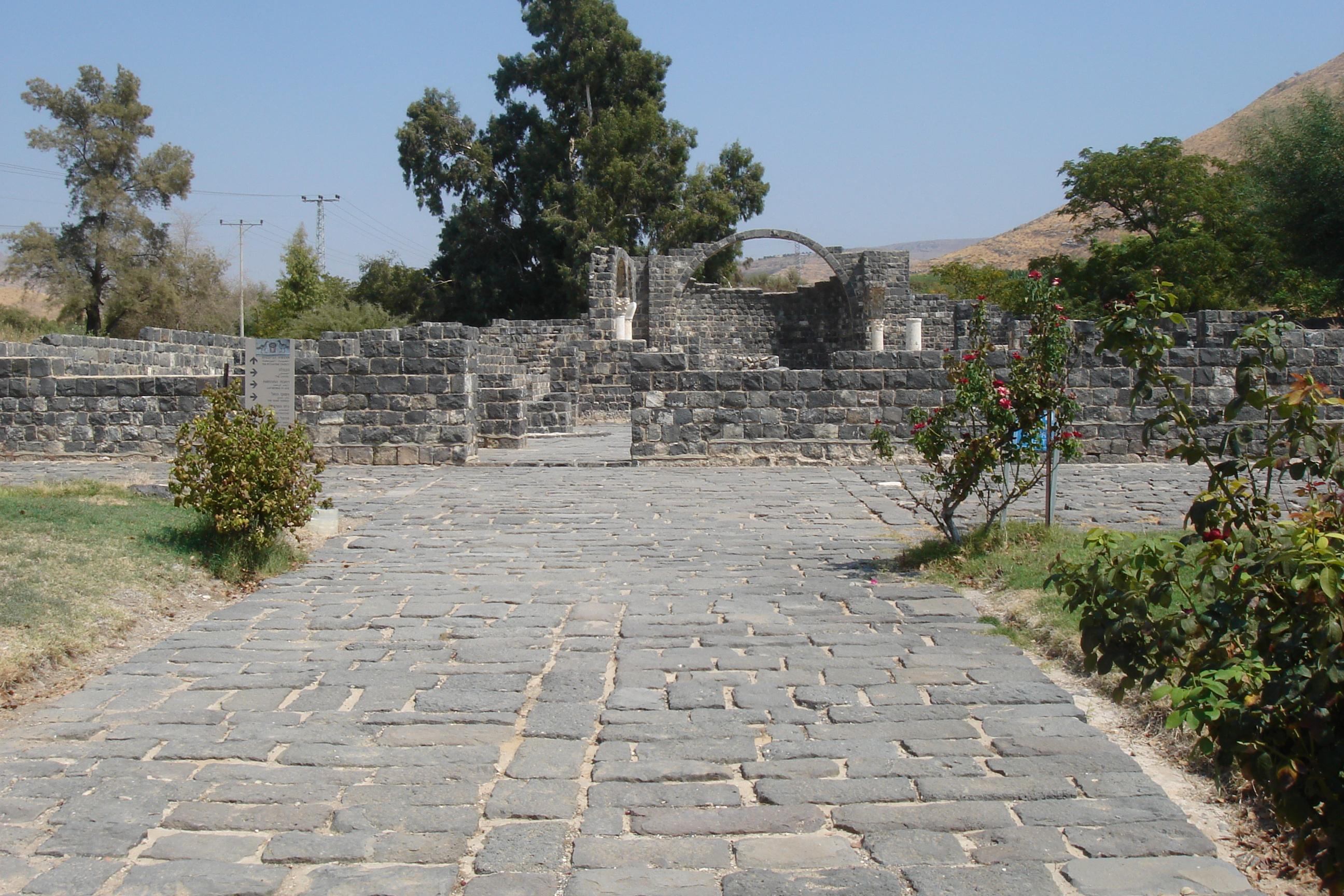
The church seen from the paved street leading up to it.

Kursi has been identified by tradition as the site of the "Miracle of the Swine", where Jesus healed a man possessed by demons by driving the demons into a herd of pigs. The pigs then ran into the lake and were drowned (Mark 5:1–20, Matthew 8:28–34, Luke 8:26–39). The details differ somewhat in the three Synoptic Gospels dealing with the episode, and again some more in various ancient manuscripts of those same gospels. The events take place in the land of either the Gerasenes, Gadarenes or Gergesenes (Mark 5:1, Matthew 8:28, Luke 8:26). Exorcised was either one man as per Mark and Luke, or two as per Matthew.

== Ancient monastery ==
=== History ===
The monastery and its church were built in the 5th century, remaining in use throughout the Byzantine period. This being a major pilgrimage site, a number of buildings were built for the accommodation of pilgrims as well as the local monastic community, all surrounded by walls and other fortifications. In 614 the Sassanian (Persian) armies invaded Israel laying waste most of its churches and monasteries, including the one at Kursi. The church was later rebuilt, but part of the destroyed settlement was left in its ruined state. The church continued functioning under Muslim rule after the conquest of Palestine in 638–641 until being totally devastated by the 749 earthquake. Arab squatters used the ruins as dwellings and for storage in the 9th century, marking the end of Kursi's use as a Christian pilgrimage site.

=== Description ===
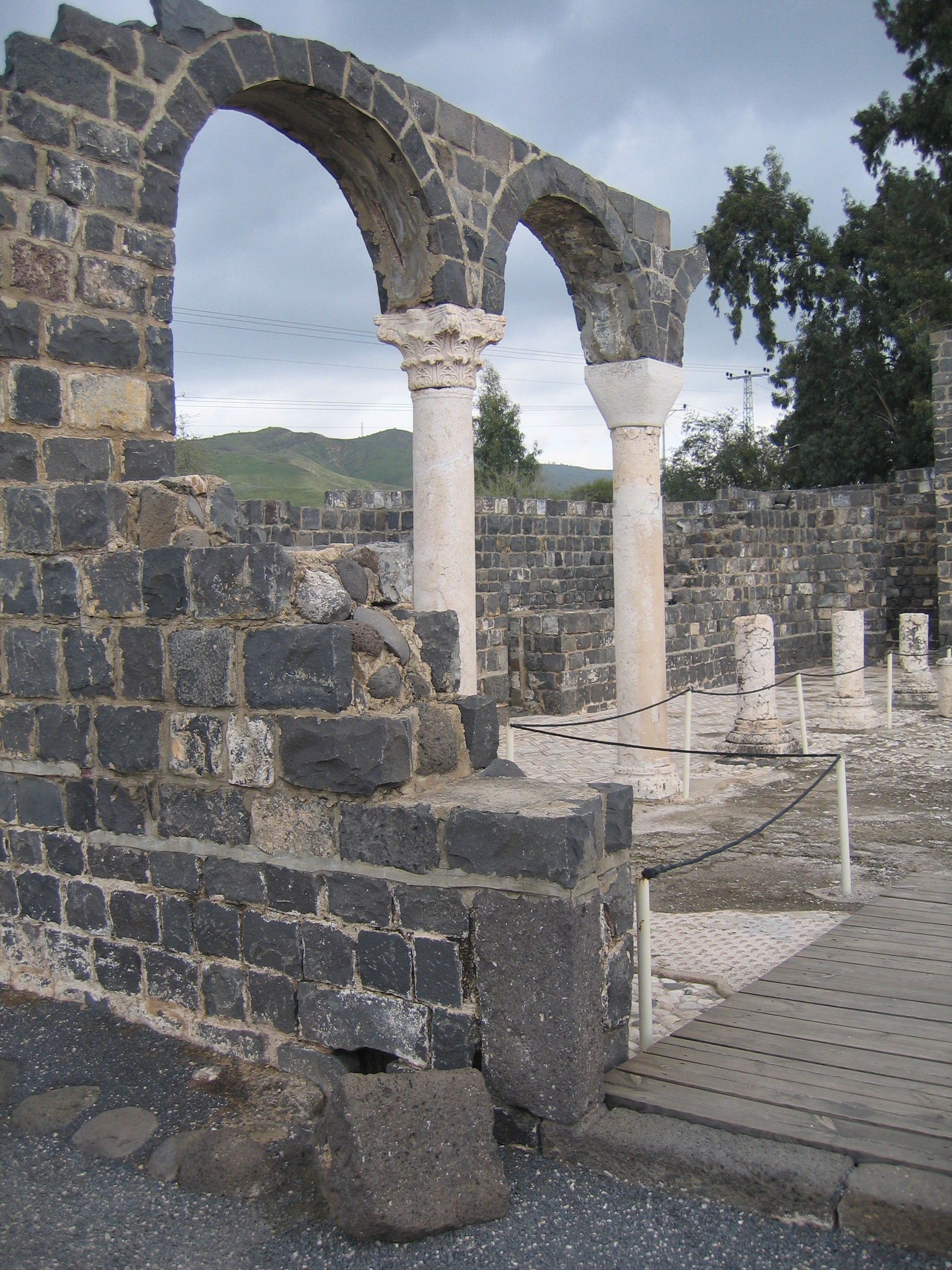
At the church entrance looking toward the northern aisle with its re-erected columns.

The monastery is surrounded by a rectangular stone wall measuring 145 x 123 meters. The entrance facing the Sea of Galilee was guarded by a watchtower, and a paved road led down to a harbor, where pilgrim boats could berth. Once inside the wall, the pilgrims had the choice of going first to a luxurious bathhouse (excavated area to the left/north of the entrance), or going straight to the centrally placed church. The church is 24 x 45 sq. metres in area, and was entered through a forecourt opening onto an atrium or inner courtyard, followed by the church proper which was flanked on both sides by chapels and auxiliary rooms. The church is of the basilical type, with two rows of columns separating it into a nave and two aisles.

The mosaic floor of the nave consists of geometrical designs, while the lateral aisles once contained medallions with depictions of the local flora and fauna; most of these were destroyed, but some are still visible, such as geese, doves, cormorants and fish, citrons, dates, pomegranates, and grapes. The baptistery chapel on the southern side of the central apse has a small baptismal font, and the mosaic floor includes an inscription indicating that it was laid in the year 585. A staircase (not accessible to visitors) leads from the southern end of the narthex to a crypt used for burials, where archaeologists have found several intact skeletons. Among the rooms on the northern side is one containing an olive press. The atrium is largely built over a large cistern, as one can see from the two well heads; a ladder leading down to the cistern is not accessible to visitors.

A small Byzantine chapel stood outside the main compound, on the hill to the south. Here a large boulder was probably considered to be the exact site of the miracle. Remains were discovered of what might have been a tower built around the boulder and of a chapel squeezed in between the hillside and the boulder. Three distinct layers of mosaic floor and an apse were excavated here.

== Archaeology ==
=== Monastic complex ===
The ruins of the monastery were first unearthed by road construction crews in 1970. Kursi lay unknown for many centuries until pieces of Byzantine pottery turned up at the site. Major excavation took place between 1971 and 1974 headed by Israeli archaeologist Dan Urman and his Greek colleague Vassilios Tzaferis for the Israel Antiquities Authority. Together they excavated the largest Byzantine monastic complex found in Israel. Further excavations have since been taking place, the marble-lined bath-house being one of the more recent discoveries.

The church has been reconstructed to a degree which allows the visitor to understand its three-dimensional shape and size.

Christian artifacts from Kursi can be viewed at the Golan Archaeological Museum.

=== Possible synagogue ===
A building that may have been a synagogue was unearthed in 2015. Large parts of a marble slab shattered into pieces and inscribed in Aramaic was found inside this building, and two words were deciphered shortly after the discovery: "amen" and "marmaria"; the latter, literally 'marble', has been interpreted by some scholars as perhaps linked with the cult of the Virgin Mary, possibly meaning 'Maria's [great] rabbi', since 'mar' means rabbi.

The scholars who excavated the fragments assume that the marble tablet initially measured some 120 by 60 centimetres. They describe the inscription as being in Hebrew, at least 1,600 years old, and consisting of eight lines commemorating a man (or several) from Tiberias who has (or have) made a donation for the building that included marble. The tablet was set into the floor and was surrounded by a simple opus sectile. It is the only such marble tablet ever found (as of 2015) in an ancient synagogue in Israel or the Golan Heights. The inscription is the first to indicate that the settlement at Kursi was Jewish or Judaeo-Christian.

== See also ==
- Golan Archaeological Museum
