= Golan Archaeological Museum =

Museum in the Golan Heights

Coordinates: 32.995369°N 35.688325°E

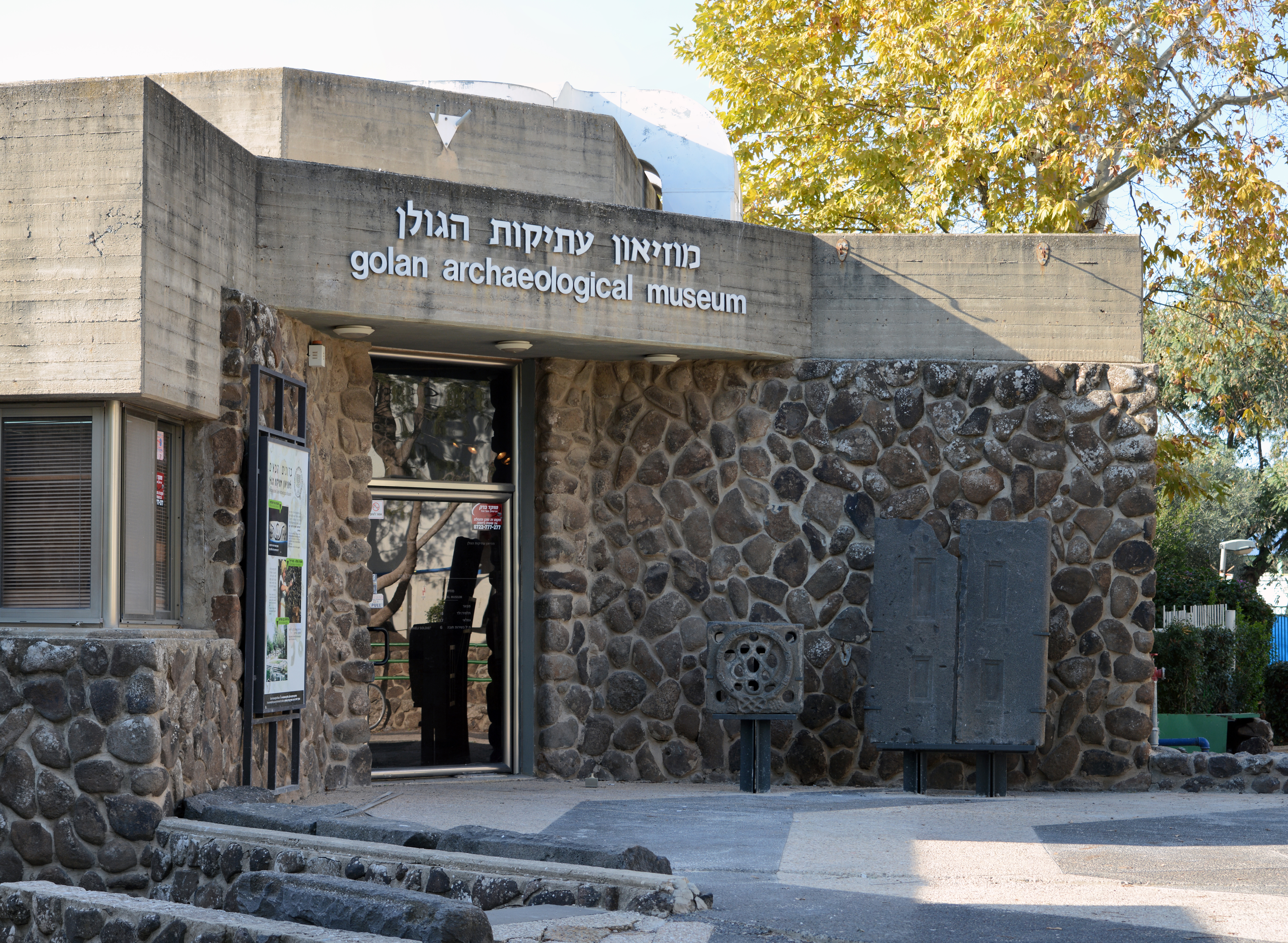
Golan Archaeological Museum

The Golan Archaeological Museum is a museum of the archaeological finds of the Golan Heights, located in Katzrin.

The museum features artifacts from all historical periods. Among these are artifacts and decorated architectural fragments from a number of Byzantine-period Christian churches and villages, including finds from Kursi, on the eastern shore of the Sea of Galilee, which is identified with Gergasa, the New Testament site of the "Miracle of the Gadarene swine" (Luke 8:22-39).

A room in the museum is dedicated to the story of Gamla, the Jewish town besieged and razed by the Romans during the First Jewish–Roman War. A scale model and film are used to describe the conquest and destruction of the town and all of its inhabitants by Vespasian in 67 CE. On display are finds from the site, including arrowheads, ballista stones, clay oil lamps, and coins minted in the town during the siege.

Other artifacts of note in the museum are many columns, lintels and other architectural parts recovered from the ruins of ancient synagogues throughout the Golan Heights. These are elaborately carved with dedicatory inscriptions and with Jewish symbols.
