= Hippos (ancient site) =

Archaeological site

- סוסיתא (Hebrew)
- Sussita/Sūsiya/Qal'at el-Ḥuṣn
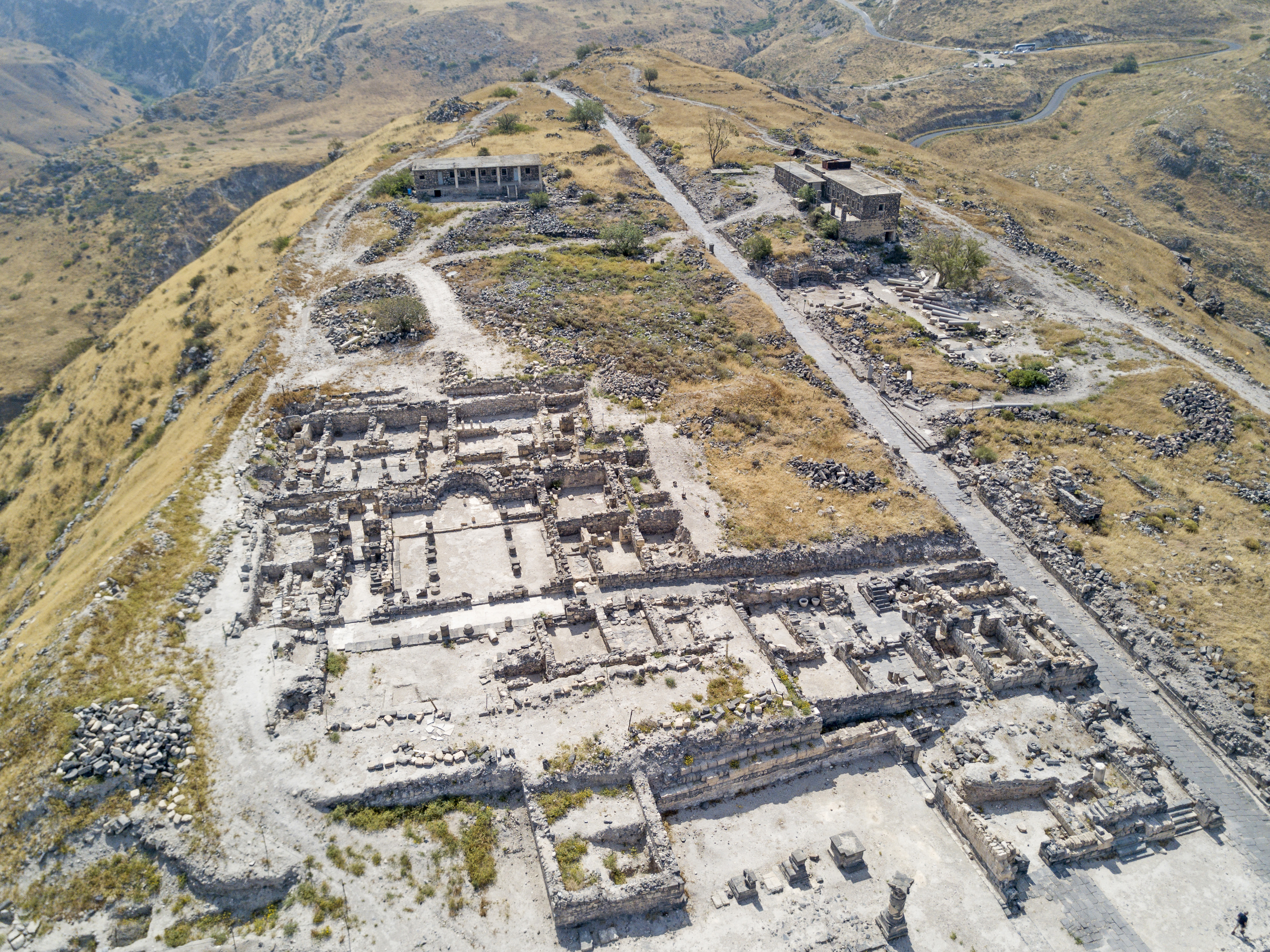
- Aerial view of Hippos (2017)
- Interactive map of Hippos
- 32.779°N 35.660°E
- Type: Ancient city
- Periods: Chalcolithic, Hellenistic, Roman, Byzantine and Umayyad
- Location: Jordan Valley
- Part of: Decapolis

History
- Built: First half of the second century BCE
- Abandoned: 749

Site notes
- Material: Basalt and nari
- Height: 140 m
- Length: 550 m
- Width: 200 m
- Excavation dates: Hippos Excavations Project
- Archaeologists: Arthur Segal, Michael Eisenberg, Arleta Kowalewska
- Condition: In ruins, partly reconstructed
- Owner: National Park
- Management: INPA
- Public access: yes
- Website: www.dighippos.com

Hippos (Ancient Greek: Ἵππος, lit. 'Horse') or Sussita (Aramaic, Hebrew: סוסיתא) is an ancient city and archaeological site located on a hill 2 km east of the Sea of Galilee, attached by a topographical saddle to the western slopes of the Golan Heights, within the Jordan Valley Regional Council.

Hippos was a Hellenistic city in the northern Jordan Valley, and a long-time member of the Decapolis, a group of ten cities more closely tied to the Greco-Roman culture than to the local Semitic-speaking population. Later, Hippos became a predominantly Christian city, which declined towards the end of the Byzantine period and throughout the Early Muslim period, and was abandoned after the 749 earthquake.

== Geography ==
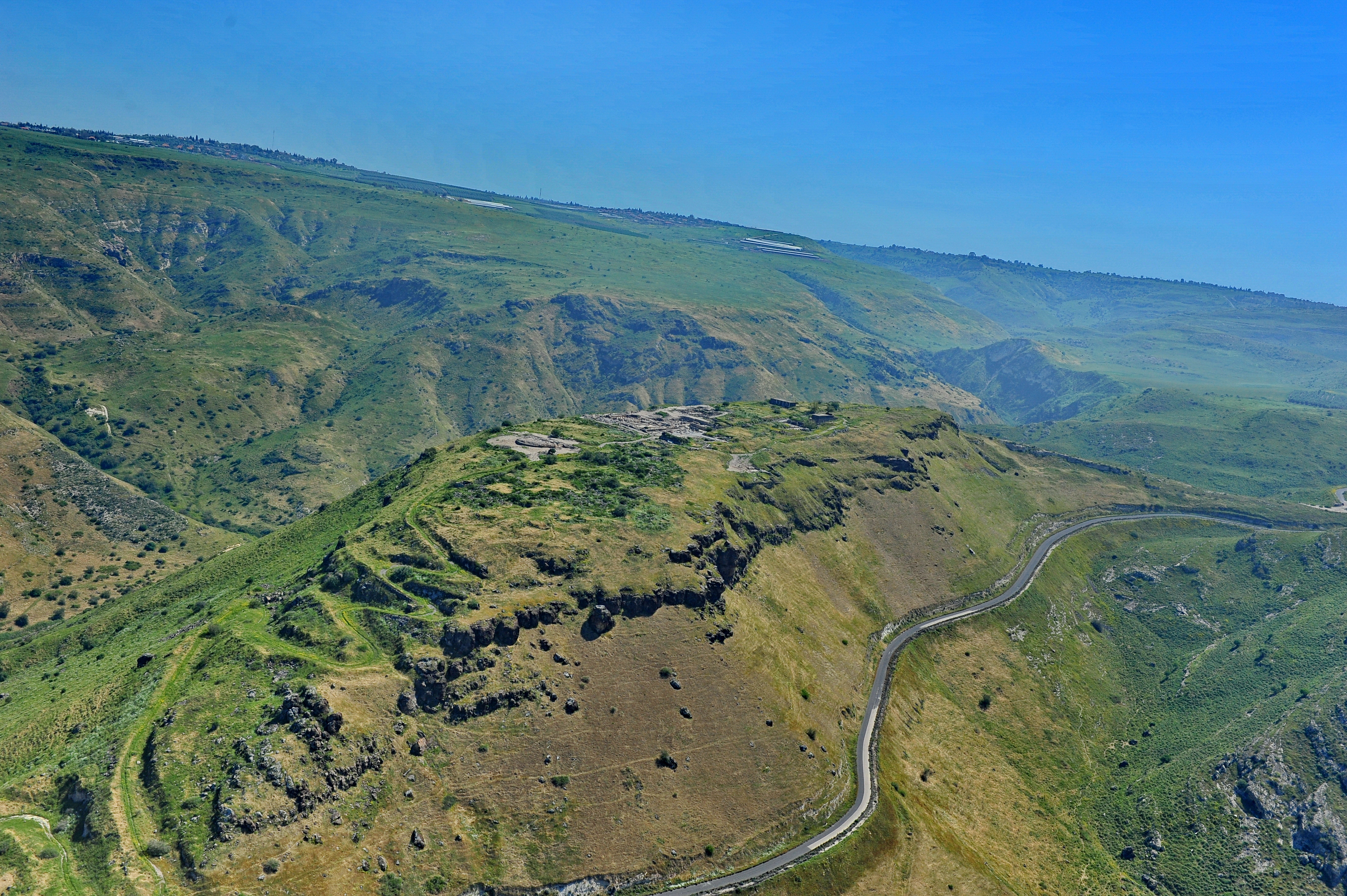
Aerial view of Hippos

Hippos was built on a flat-topped foothill 2 kilometres (1.2 mi) east of and 350 metres (1,150 ft) above the Sea of Galilee, 144 metres (472 ft) above sea level, near Ein Gev.

Besides the fortified city itself, Hippos had a harbor on the Sea of Galilee and a large area of the surrounding hinterland (Hippos' Territorium).

== Etymology ==
The city was founded in the mid-second century BCE as Antioch of Hippos (Ἀντιόχεια τοῦ Ἵππου) Hippos is Greek for horse and a common name among Seleucid monarchs. In the 5th-7th century Mosaic of Rehob, the site is identified by its Aramaic name, Sussita (Hebrew: סוסיתא) also meaning "horse". In Arabic it is Qal'at al-Ḥiṣn or Qal'at al-Ḥuṣn (قلعة الحصن) meaning "Fortress of the Horse/Stallion". Alternate spellings include Hippus, a Latinized version of the Greek name. Rabbi Joshua ben Levi identified the Land of Tob mentioned in Judges 11 as identical with Hippos.

== History ==
Archaeological evidence shows habitation at Hippos from the Early/Middle Chalcolithic period.

=== Hellenistic period ===
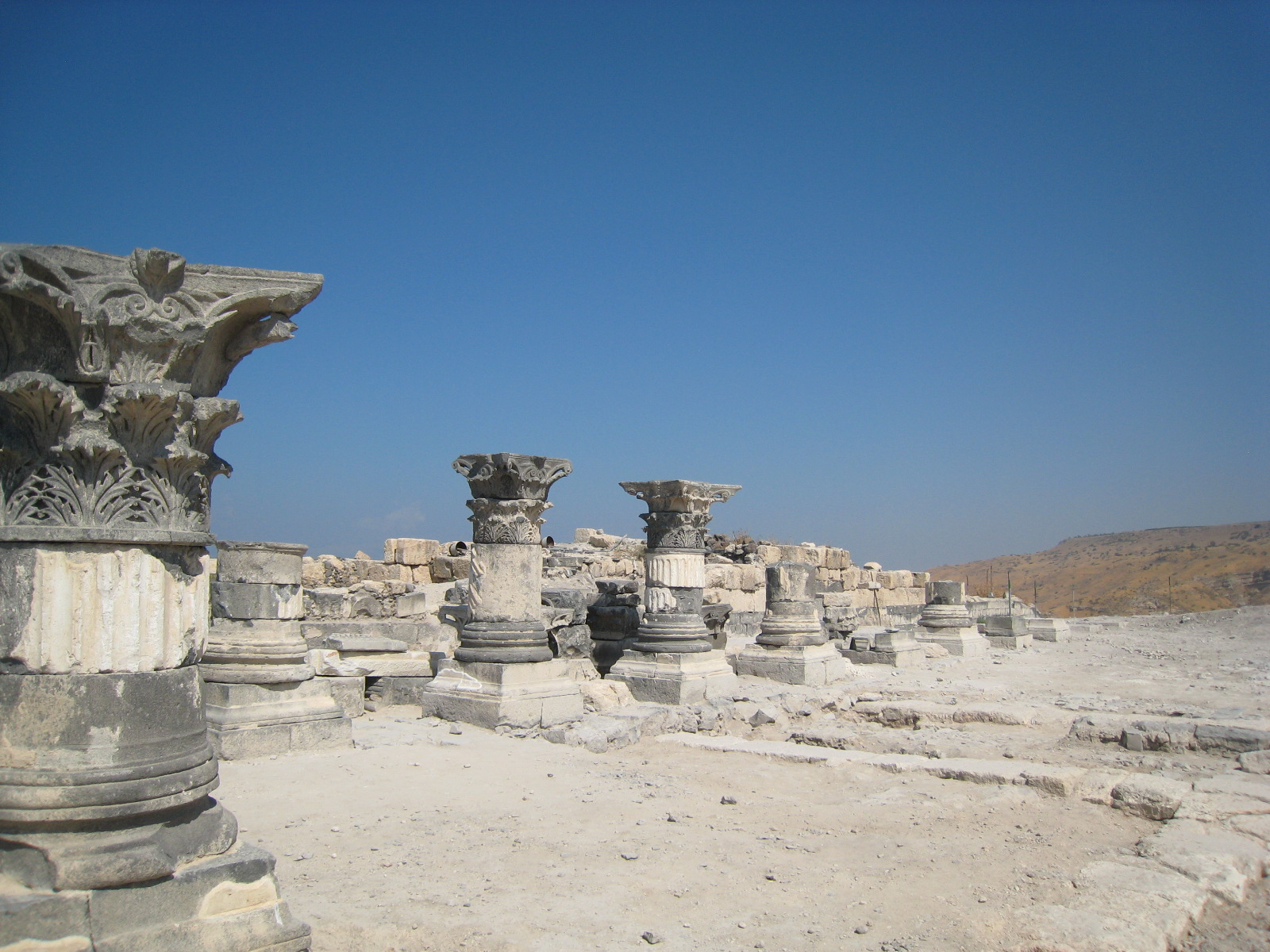
Columns in Hippos

The site was re-inhabited in the third century BCE by the Ptolemies, though whether it was an urban settlement or a military outpost is still unknown. During this time, Coele-Syria served as the battleground between two dynasties descending from captains of Alexander the Great, the Ptolemies and the Seleucids. It is likely that Hippos, on a very defensible site along the border lines of the 3rd century BCE, was founded as a border fortress for the Ptolemies. The city of Hippos itself was established by Seleucid colonists, most likely in the middle of the second century BCE. Its full name, Antiochia Hippos (Latin: Antiocheia ad Hippum), reflects a Seleucid founding.

As the Seleucids took possession of all of Coele-Syria, Hippos grew into a full-fledged polis, a city-state with control over the surrounding countryside. Antiochia Hippos was improved with all the makings of a Greek polis: a temple, a central market area, and other public structures. The availability of water limited the size of Hellenistic Hippos. The citizens relied on rain-collecting cisterns for all their water; this kept the city from supporting a very large population.

In the first century BCE, the Hasmonean ruler Alexander Yanai conquered the city.

=== Roman period ===
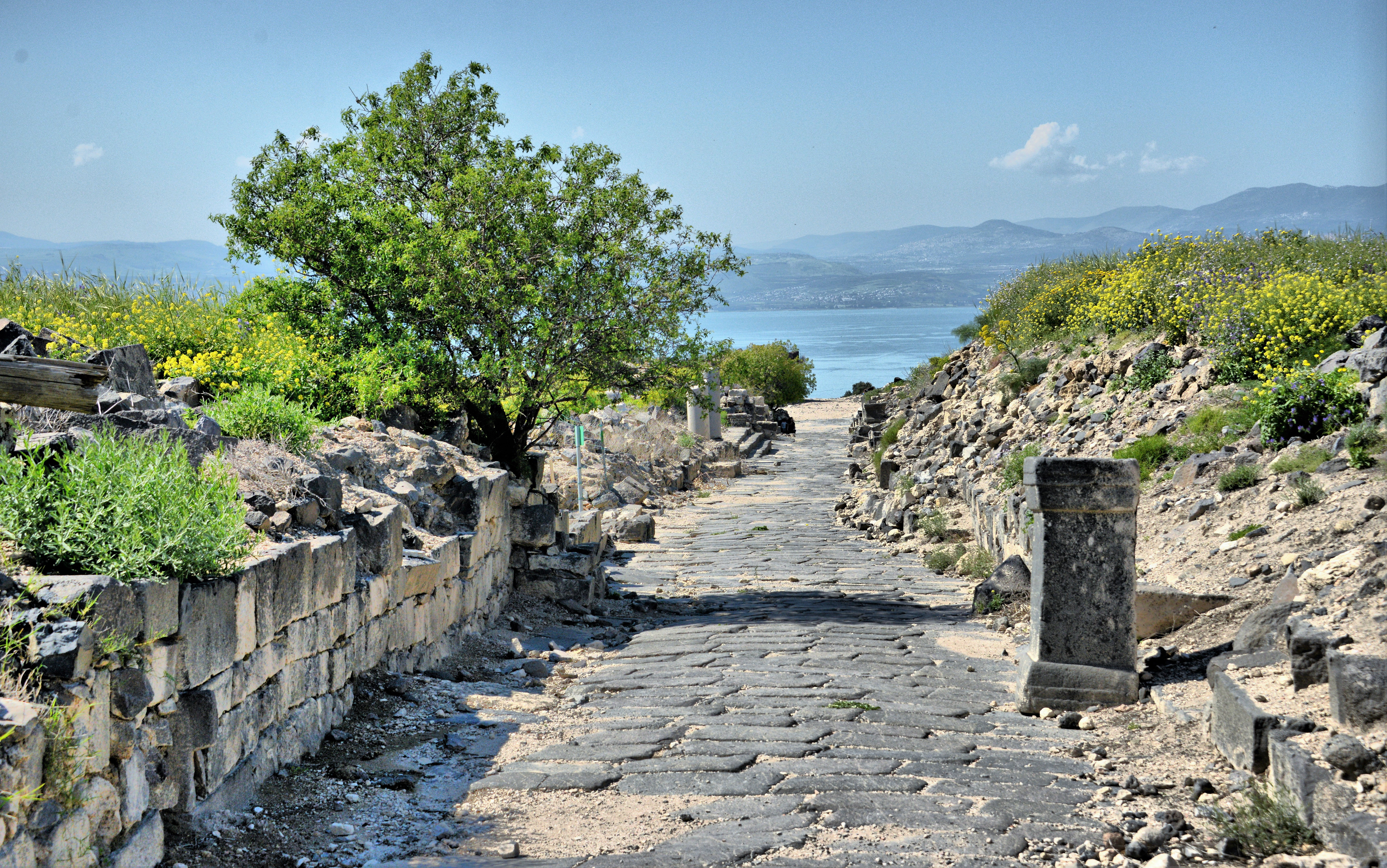
Decumanus maximus in Hippos

In 63 BCE the Roman general Pompey conquered Coele-Syria, including Judea, and ended Hasmonean independence. Hippos was known as one of the Decapolis and was incorporated into the Roman Provincia Syria. Under Roman rule, Hippos was granted a certain degree of autonomy. The city minted its own coins, stamped with the image of a horse in honor of the city's name.

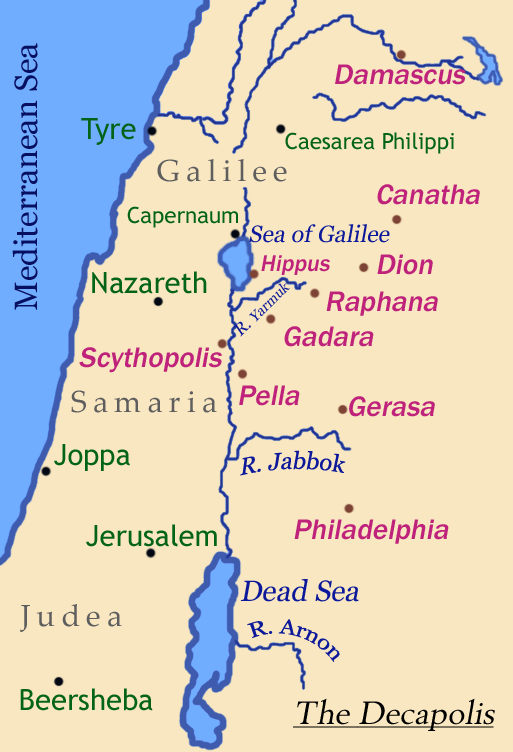
The Decapolis, showing the location of Hippos ("Hippus")

Hippos was given to Herod the Great in 27 BCE, and returned to the Province of Syria at his death in 4 BCE. According to Josephus, during this time Hippos, a pagan city, was the "sworn enemy" of the new Jewish city across the lake, Tiberias. Josephus recounts that during the First Jewish–Roman War of AD 66–70, following the destruction of the Jews in Scythopolis, the Jews of Hippos suffered a massacre. Other Jews from Hippos joined the revolt in Tarichaea.

After the Romans put down the Bar Kokhba's revolt, they created the province of Syria Palaestina in 135, of which Hippos was a part. In the early 2nd century CE Hippos reached its peak of prosperity and growth. The city was built along a grid pattern, centered around a colonnaded decumanus maximus running east–west through the city as early as the mid-1st century CE. Other monuments included a Kalybe (a shrine to the Emperor), a theatre, an odeon, a basilica, and new city walls. The most important improvement, however, was the aqueduct, which led water into Hippos from the El-Al stream in the Golan Heights, 24 km long each aqueduct. The water, collected in a large, vaulted cistern, allowed a large population to live in the city.

During the Late Roman period, the imperial restructuring under Diocletian placed Hippos in the province of Palaestina Secunda, encompassing Galilee and the Golan Heights.

=== Byzantine period ===
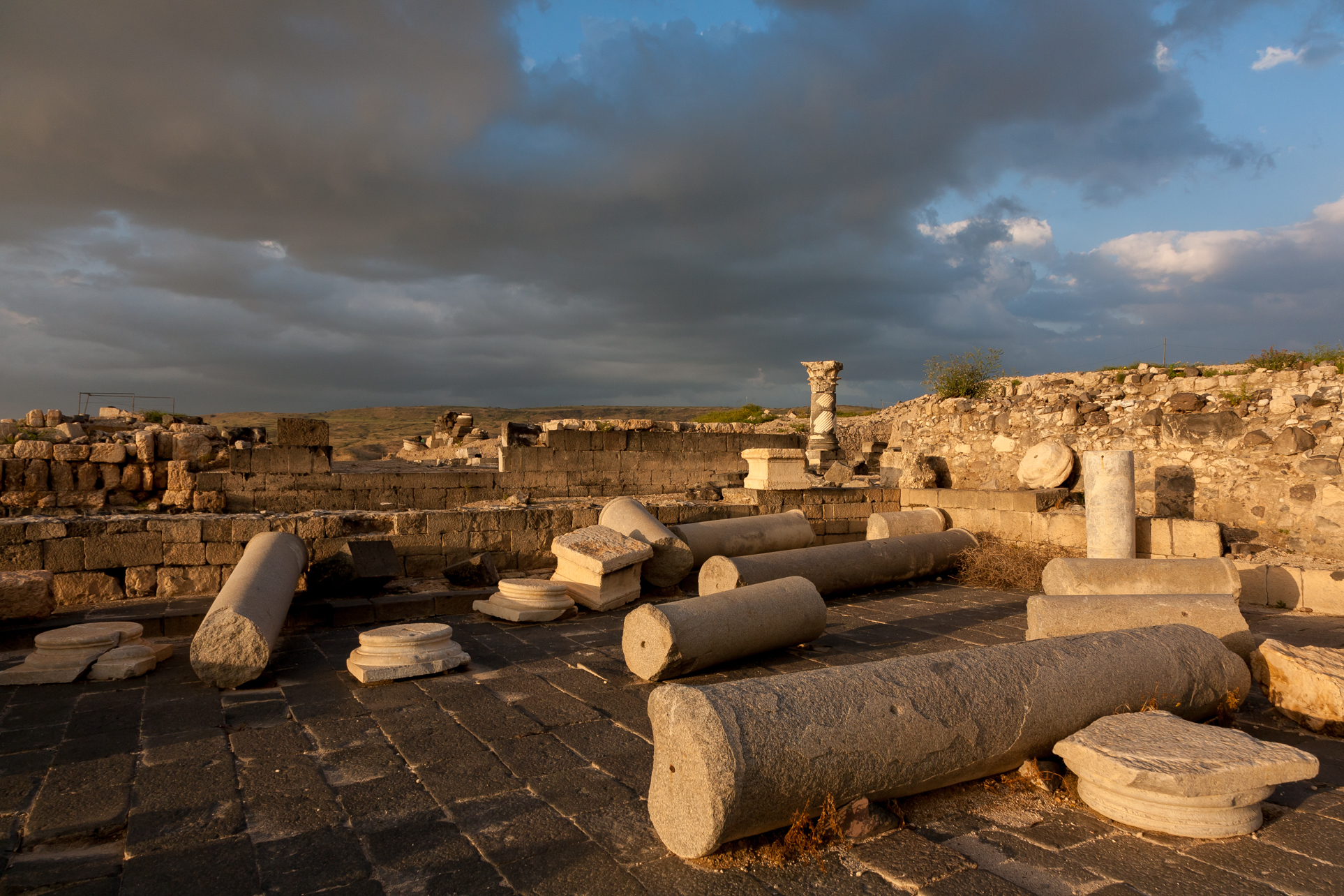
Hippos forum

When Christianity became officially tolerated in the Roman Empire, giving rise to what is called by historians the Byzantine period, Palestine became the target of imperial subsidies for churches and monasteries, and Christian pilgrims brought additional revenue.

Christianity came slowly to Hippos. There is no evidence of any Christian presence before the 4th century. Gradually, the city was Christianized, becoming the seat of a bishop by at least 359. One Bishop Peter of Hippos is listed in surviving records of church councils in 359 and 362. Dedication inscriptions by two deaconess, one in Greek and one in Christian Palestinian Aramaic from nearby ‘Uyūn Umm el-‘Azam stand for Christian presence and their active worship by female clerics who officiated in these churches.

=== Rashidun and Umayyad periods ===
The Muslim armies of the Rashidun period invaded Byzantine province Palestina Secunda in the 7th century, completing their conquest by 641. Hippos' new Arab rulers allowed the citizens to continue practicing Christianity, a policy then continued by the Umayyad Caliphate. According to archaeologists, the Islamic regime did not pull down the churches but Christian imagery engraved on Byzantine brass bread stamps and chancel screens was covered over with a paste of tin and lead.

Hippos was abandoned after the 749 Galilee earthquake.

== Archaeology ==
=== 1880s surveys ===
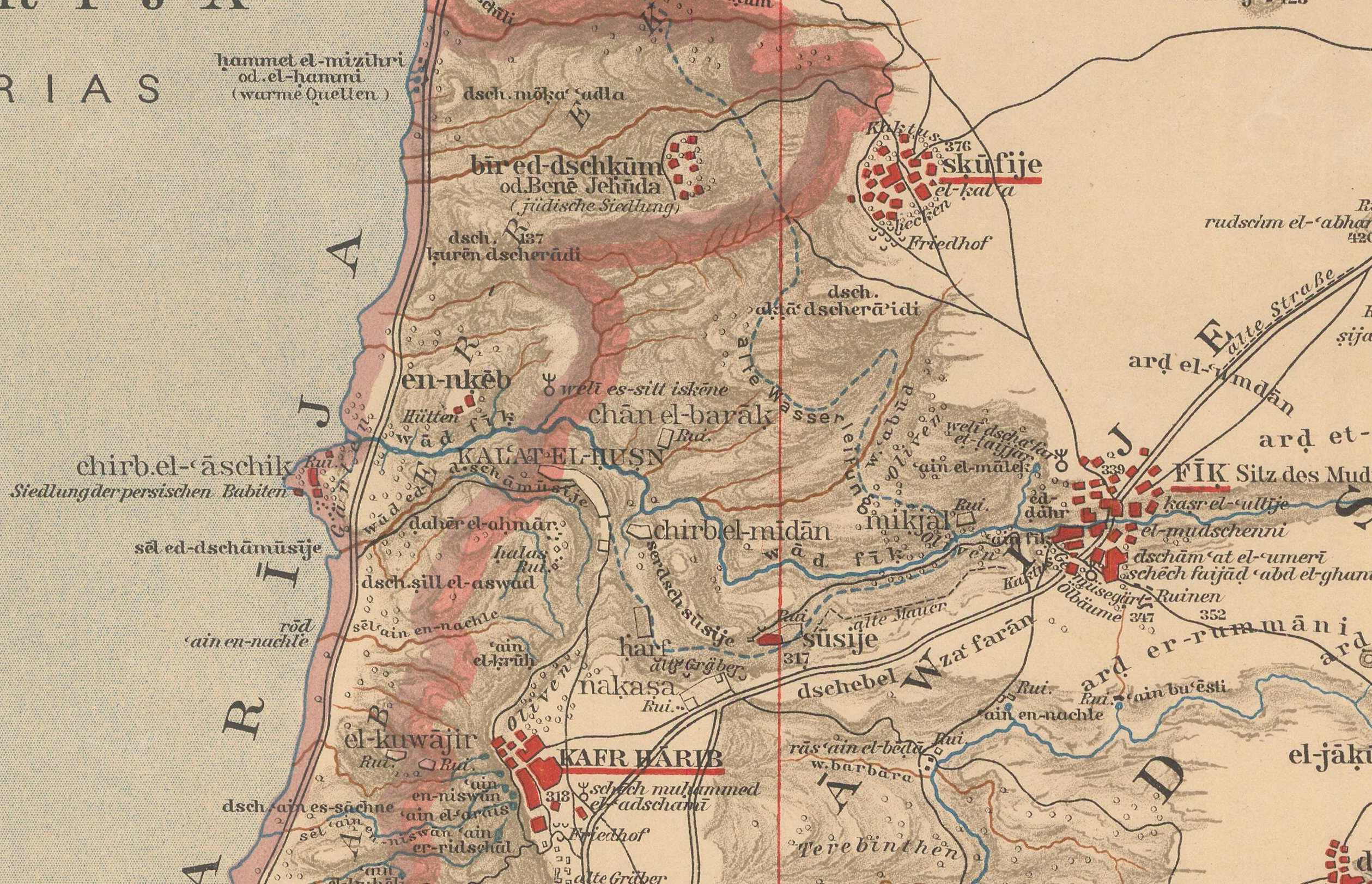
Hippos (Kalat al Husn) in the Schumacher Ostjordanlandes map, surrounded by the villages of Fiq, Kafr Harib and Skufije.

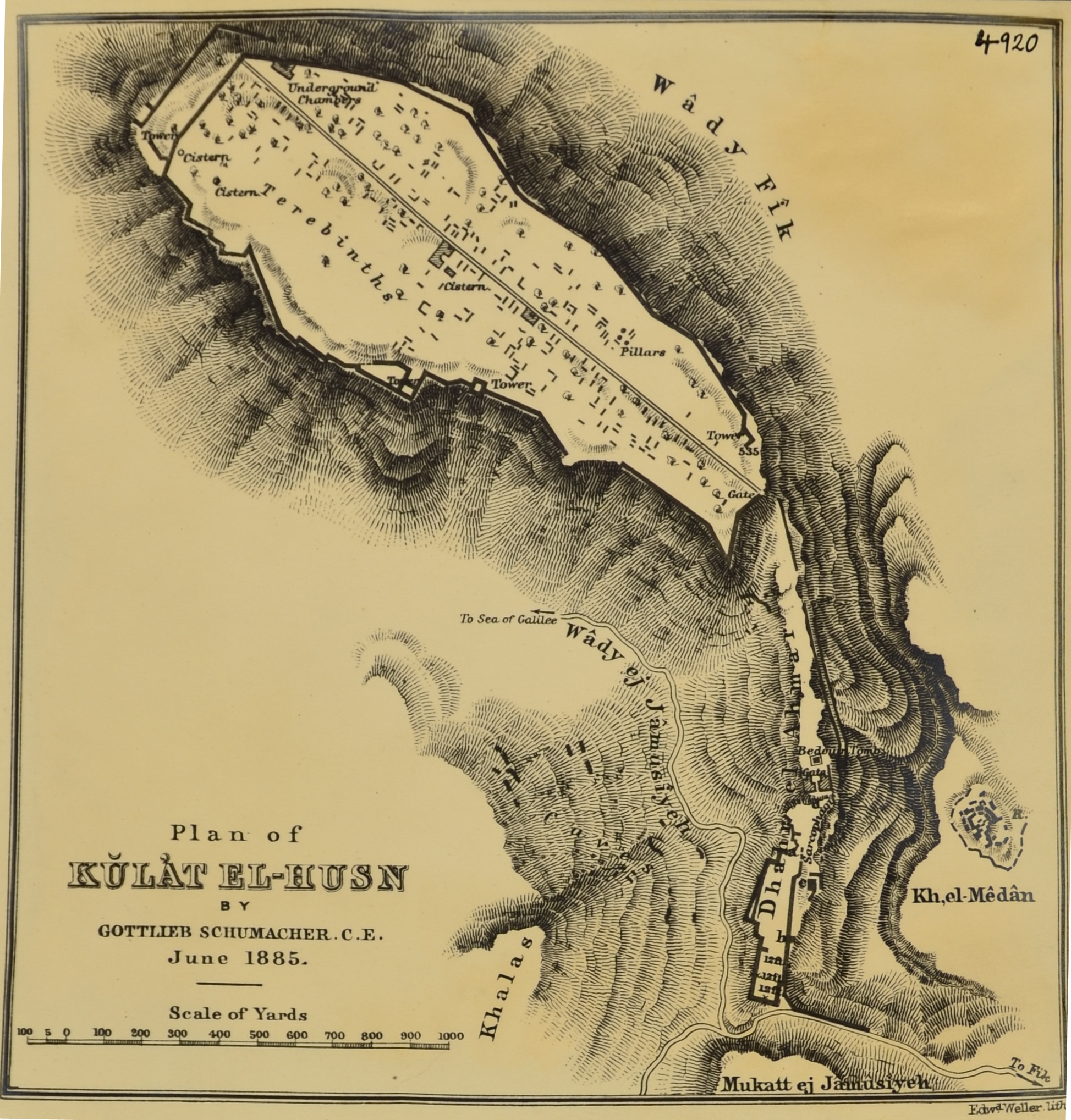
Plan of Hippos by Gottlieb Schumacher 1885

G. Schumacher visited the ruin in 1883–1885, giving a protracted account of Hippos (Kŭlat el Husn) in his work, The Jaulân, although he had incorrectly surmised that the site may have been the ancient Gamala described by Josephus.

=== 1950s excavations ===
The first excavations were carried out by Israeli archaeologists Emmanuel Anati, Claire Epstein, Michael Avi-Yonah and others from 1951 to 1955. They unearthed some domestic buildings, the main city gate at the east and a large Byzantine church that had probably been the seat of Hippos' bishop. After the excavations, the Israel Defense Forces used Mount Sussita for the same purpose as the ancient Greeks—as a fortress. It was used as a border defense against Syria until much of the Golan Heights were captured by Israel in the 1967 Six-Day War.

In 1964 Hippos was declared a national park and in 2004 the area around it, including the site itself, were declared a national reserve.

=== From 1999 ===
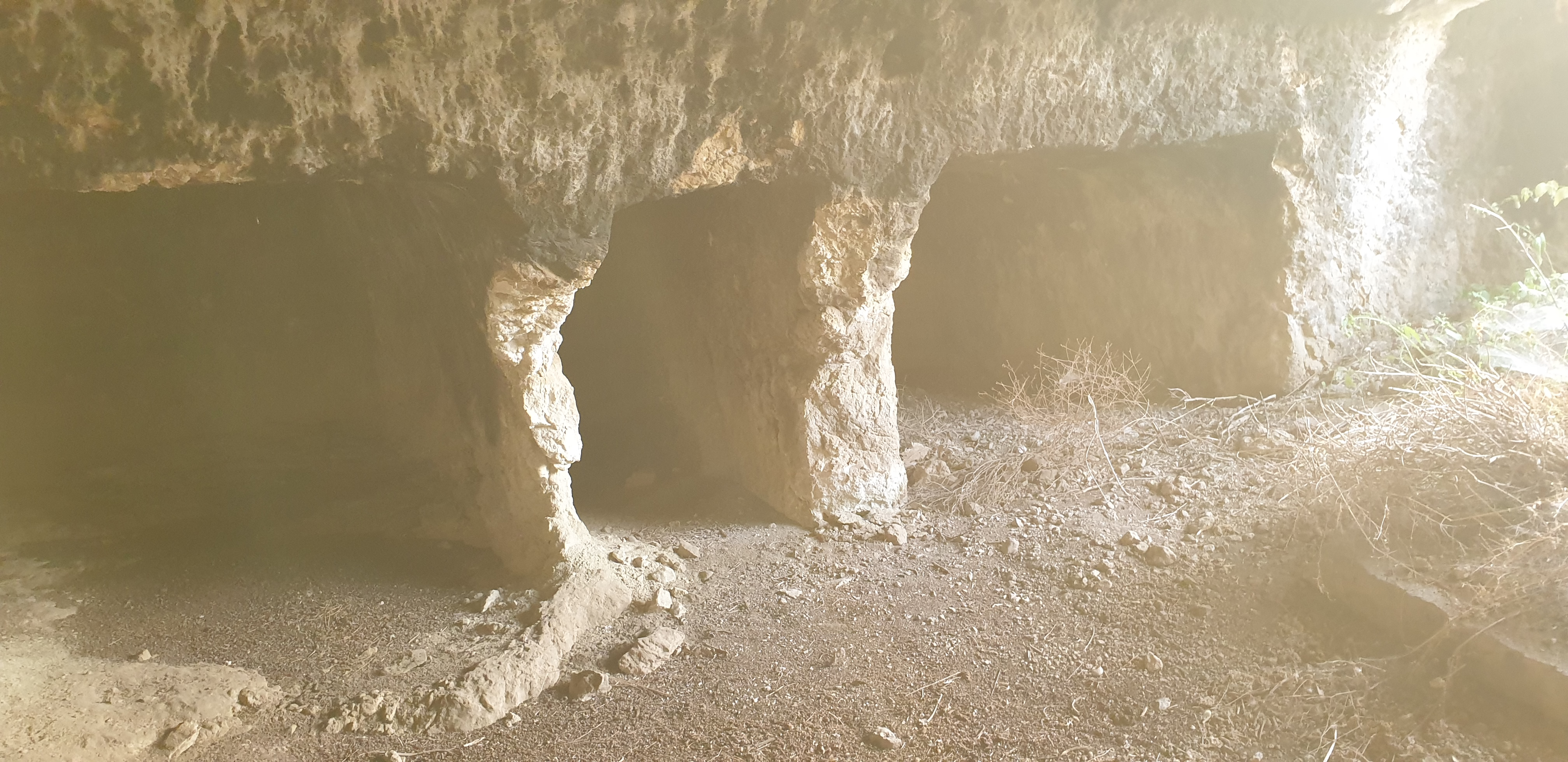
Hippos necropolis on the hillside, detail

Following an archaeological survey conducted in 1999, the site has been excavated annually. The research undertaken at Hippos-Sussita is an international project. The first eleven seasons (2000–2010) were an Israeli–Polish–American collaboration co-directed by Arthur Segal and Michael Eisenberg from the Zinman Institute of Archaeology, University of Haifa; Jolanta Młynarczyk from the Research Centre for Mediterranean Archaeology, Polish Academy of Sciences; Mariusz Burdajewicz of the National Museum, Warsaw; and Mark Schuler from Concordia University, St. Paul, Minnesota, USA. The main areas of excavation were the odeon, the Roman basilica, the North-West Church, the North-East Church and its surrounding insulae, domestic quarters, the southern bathhouse, the eastern defensive ditch and fortifications next to it and the necropoleis (burial grounds). From 2012 the excavations were directed by Eisenberg, focusing on the Roman basilica, the Roman-Byzantine southern bathhouse, the north-east insula, the living quarters and the Roman bastion. From 2016, Arleta Kowalewska joined the directorship and the team focuses on the street network, saddle compound and saddle necropolis.

In 2010, the objective was to excavate the streets, public buildings and domestic quarters, as well as the two necropolis located to the south and the southeast of the city. The relationship between the city and the surrounding countryside would be the focus of subsequent digs, especially the area stretching between the city and the lake. A detailed survey of the lake shore to establish the exact location of Hippos' port was also planned.

=== 2015 findings ===
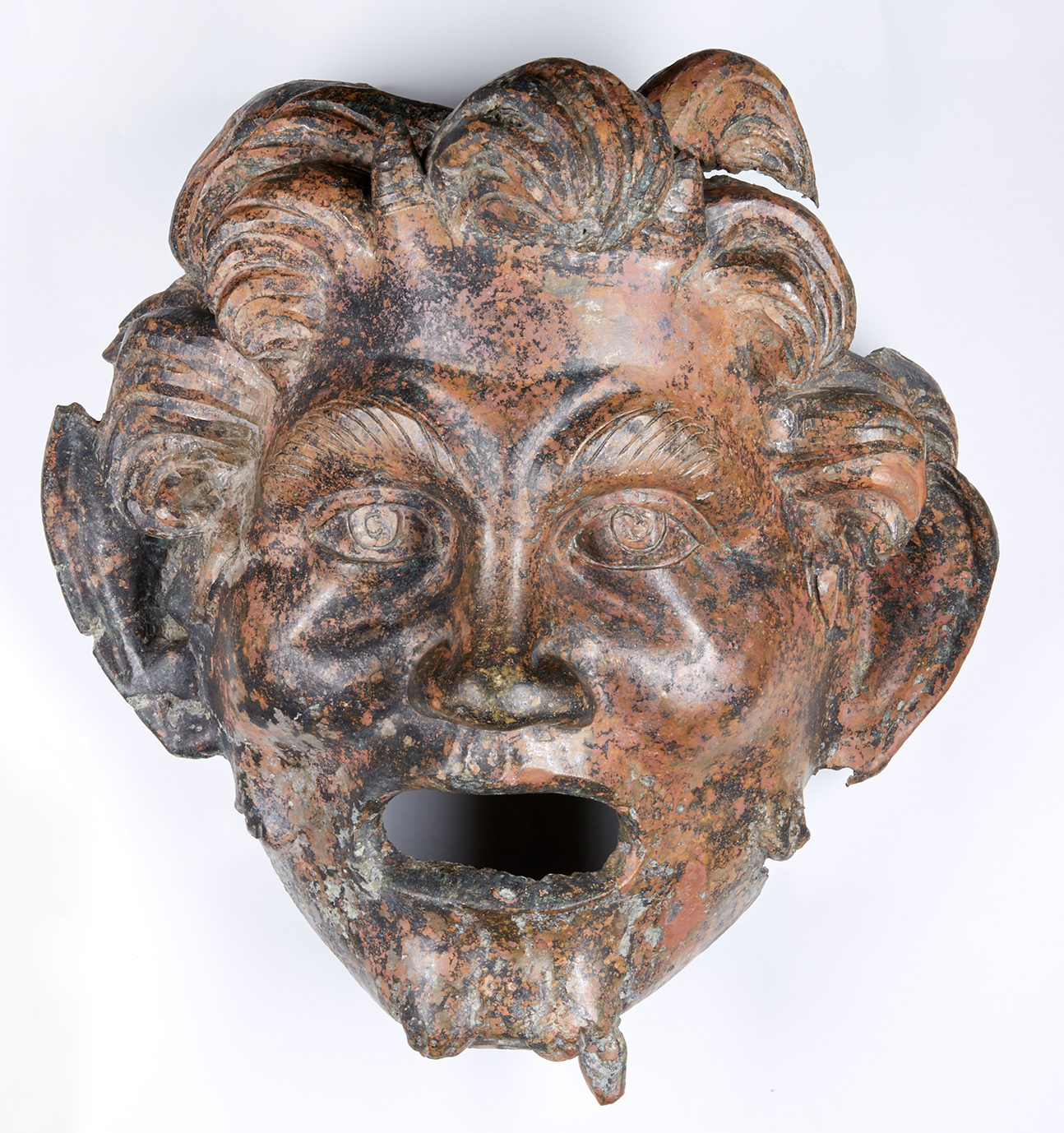
Over life size mask of the Greek god Pan, unearthed in the site in 2015

In 2015 a large bronze mask, almost without equal for its dimensions and dated between the 1st century BCE and the 2nd century CE, depicting the Greek god Pan was retrieved by archaeologists from the site.

== Christian tradition ==
In the New Testament, when Jesus mentions a "city set upon a hill" that "cannot be hidden" (one of the metaphors of Salt and Light in the Sermon on the Mount), he may have been referring to Hippos, although there have been speculations that he referred to Safed. In addition, a miracle of Jesus recounted in Mark 5 and Luke 8 may also be related to Hippos (Mark 5, Luke 8). See Gergesa for a discussion of the location of this miracle.

Catholic mystic Maria Valtorta in her vision-based work "Poem of the Man God" asserted that Jesus Christ visited and preached in Hippos.
