= Gergesa =

Historical place in Israel

- Interactive map of Gergesa
- 32.8°N 35.7°E
- Periods: Herodian Period (37 BCE - 70 CE)
- Cultures: Byzantine

Site notes
- Management: Israel Nature and Parks Authority
- Website: Kursi National Park

Map of Roman Israel showing Gadara and Gerasa

Gergesa, also Gergasa (Γέργεσα in Byzantine greek) or the Country of the Gergesenes, is a place on the eastern (Golan Heights) side of the Sea of Galilee located at some distance to the ancient Decapolis cities of Gadara and Gerasa. Today, it is identified with El-Koursi or Kursi. It is mentioned in some ancient manuscripts of the Gospel of Matthew as the place where the Miracle of the Swine took place, a miracle performed by Jesus who drove demons out of a possessed man into a herd of pigs. All three Synoptic Gospels mention this miracle, Matthew writes about two possessed men instead of just one, and only some manuscripts of his Gospel name the location as Gergesa, while the other copies, as well as all versions of Luke and Mark, mention either Gadara or Gerasa (see Mark 5:1-20, Luke 8:26-39, Matthew 8:28-34). The "Gerasa" reading is problematic, because Gerasa is neither near a sea nor does it border Galilee.

Some are of the opinion that Gergesa was the country of the ancient Girgashites; but it is more probable that 'Gergesenes' was introduced by Origen upon mere conjecture; as before him most copies seem to have read 'Gadarenes', agreeable to the parallel passages and the ancient Syriac version. In any event, the "country of the Gergesenes/Gadarenes/Gerasenes" in the New Testament Gospels refers to some location on the eastern shore of the Sea of Galilee. The name is derived from either a lakeside village, Gergesa, the next larger city, Gadara, or the best-known city in the region, Gerasa. It is likely that the "Gerasa" reading is erroneous and a copyist error for "Gergesa," since only the latter place is bordering a lake while Gerasa is very far away from a lake.

== Interpretations ==
Gergesenes means "those who come from pilgrimage or fight."

Many New Testament manuscripts refer to the "Country of the Gadarenes" or "Gerasenes" rather than the Gergesenes. Both Gerasa and Gadara were cities to the east of the Sea of Galilee and the River Jordan. They were both Gentile cities filled with citizens who were culturally more Greek than Semitic; this would account for the pigs in the biblical account. Gerasa and Gadara are accounted for in historical accounts (by writers such as Pliny the Elder and Josephus) and by archaeological research. Today they are the modern towns of Jerash and Umm Qais.

A third city, Hippos, was similar in character to Gadara and Gerasa, and it may fit the biblical account even better. It was located on the shore of the Sea of Galilee, whereas Gerasa and Gadara were several kilometers south-east of it. Hippos, Gerasa, and Gadara were all counted in the Decapolis, an informal grouping of Greco-Roman cities just south of the ancient city of Caesarea Philippi.

== Identification with Kursi ==
Byzantine monks venerated a site a few kilometres north of Hippos on the lakeshore as the miracle's location. It is the only place fitting Matthew's description, since it contains the only "steep bank" in the area descending to the shore of the lake. The site became known since at least the Early Muslim period as Kursya, the Aramaic word for "chair", and later as Kursi, a word with the same meaning in Arabic, The monks built a walled monastic complex there and made it a destination for Christian pilgrims. That monastery was destroyed by the Sasanian military in 614, partially rebuilt, and finally levelled by the 749 Galilee earthquake. The remains of the monastery can be visited in the Kursi National Park. Christian artifacts from Kursi can be viewed at the Golan Archaeological Museum.
