= Vassilios Tzaferis =

Greek–Israeli biblical archaeologist and Orthodox monk

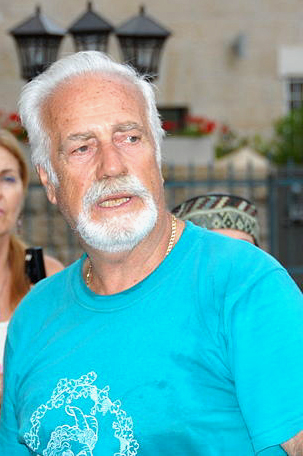
Tzaferis in 2007

Vassilios Tzaferis (Greek: Βασίλης Τζαφέρης; Hebrew: וסיליוס צפֵיריס; 1 April 1936 – 1 January 2015) was a Greek–Israeli biblical archaeologist and Orthodox monk, best known for his discovery of the remains of a crucified man at Givat HaMivtar. He was the director of surveys and excavations at the Israel Antiquities Authority (1999–2001) and the curator of the Patriarchal Museum in Jerusalem (1984–2004).

== Early life and ecclesiastic career ==
Tzaferis was born on 1 April 1936 on the Greek island of Samos. He began studying theology at the Greek Orthodox Patriarchate of Jerusalem in 1950. He took monastic vows and was ordained a deacon in 1956 and a priest in 1958. Considering leaving the priesthood to study in Athens, he instead obtained permission from Benedict I of Jerusalem to study history and archaeology at the Hebrew University of Jerusalem whilst retaining his monastic habit.

Tzaferis left the church in 1964, in order to marry. Now required to perform mandatory military service in Greece, he also renounced his Greek citizenship in order to remain in Israel. He continued his studies at the Hebrew University and began working as a field archaeologist for the Israel Department of Antiquities (now known as the Israel Antiquities Authority).

== Archaeological career ==
Tzaferis went on to obtain an MA and PhD in classical archaeology from the Hebrew University. He was awarded his PhD in 1971, with a dissertation on the "development of the cross as a Christian symbol". He continued working at the Department of Antiquities for the rest of his career, being appointed first deputy director (1971) and then director (1999) of its Division for Surveys and Excavations, and retiring in 2001. He also served as the curator of the Patriarchal Museum in Jerusalem from 1984 to 2002 and was a member of the Supreme Archaeological Council of Israel.

Tzaferis excavated at various sites in Jerusalem, as well as at Ashkelon, Beth She'an, Caesarea Philippi, Capernaum, Kursi, and Tel Dan. He made his best known discovery in 1968 at Givat HaMivtar: the remains of a crucified man named Yehohanan bar Hagkol, the only certain physical evidence of Roman crucifixion known until the discovery of the Fenstanton victim. He also published research on Byzantine monasticism.

Tzaferis died on 1 January 2015.
