= 749 Galilee earthquake =

Earthquake in the Levant

The 749 earthquake
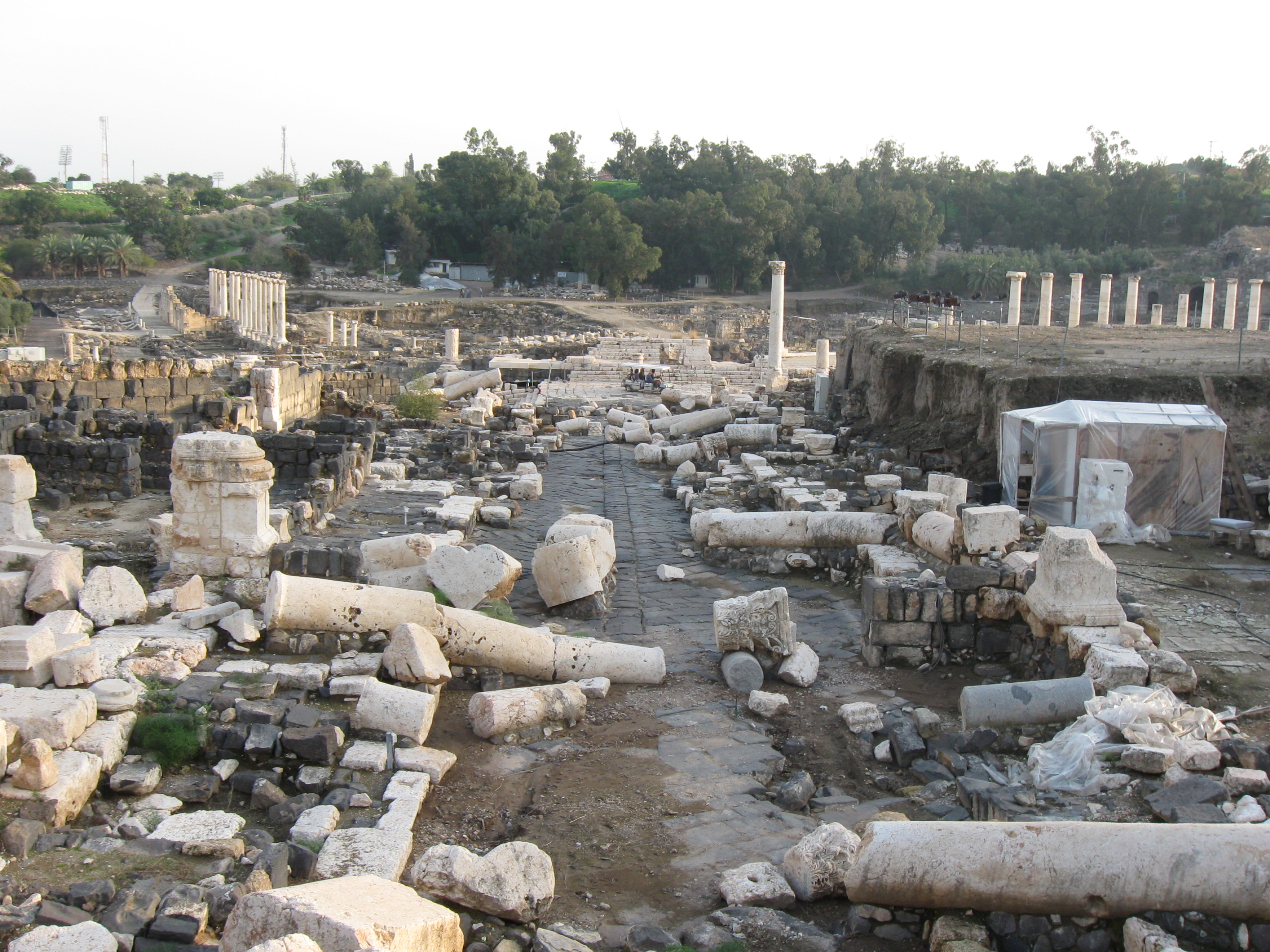
- Scythopolis (Beit She'an) was one of the cities destroyed in the earthquake of 749.

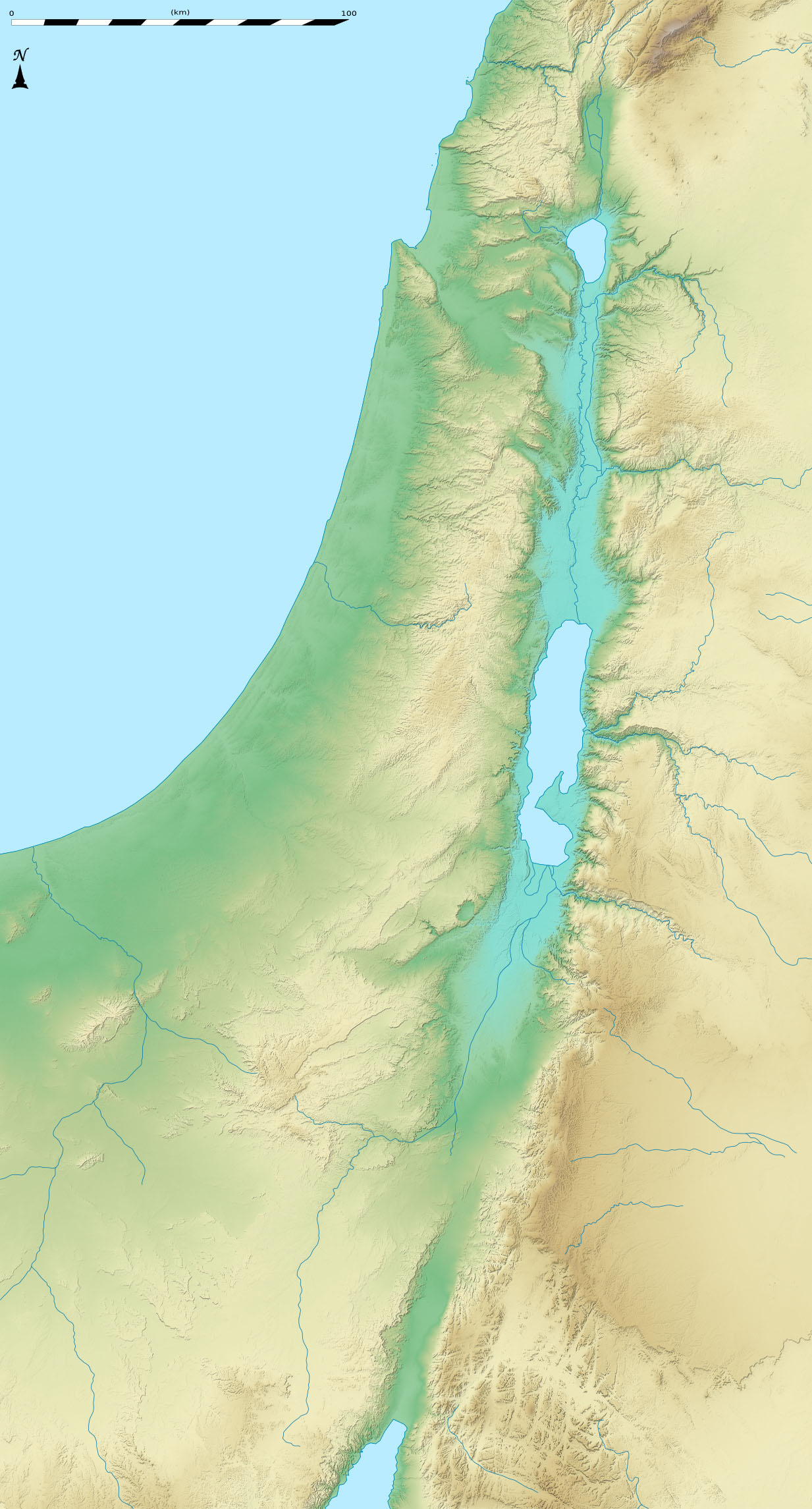
- Local date: January 18, 749
- Magnitude: 7.0
- Epicenter: 32°N 35.5°E
- Fault: Dead Sea Transform
- Areas affected: Bilad al-Sham province, Umayyad Caliphate (modern-day Israel, Syria, Palestine (West Bank), Jordan and Lebanon)
- Max. intensity: MMI XI (Extreme)
- Casualties: unknown, may have exceeded 100,000

A devastating earthquake known in scientific literature as the Earthquake of 749 struck on January 18, 749, in areas of the Umayyad Caliphate, with the epicenter in Galilee. The most severely affected areas were west and east of the Jordan River. The cities of Tiberias, Beit She'an, Pella, Gadara, and Hippos were largely destroyed, while many other cities across the Levant were heavily damaged. The casualties numbered in the tens of thousands.

There are firm reasons to believe that there were either two, or a series of, earthquakes between 747 and 749, later conflated for different reasons into one, not least due to the use of different calendars in different sources. It seems probable that the second quake, centered more to the north, which created massive damage mainly in modern-day northern Israel and Jordan, did so not so much due to its catastrophic magnitude, but rather as a result of buildings being weakened by the previous, more southerly earthquake.

== Damage and casualties ==
According to historical sources, supported by archaeological findings, Scythopolis (Beit She'an), Tiberias, Capernaum, Hippos (Sussita), Jerash and Pella suffered widespread damage. A Coptic priest from Alexandria reported that support beams had shifted in houses in Egypt and a Syrian priest wrote that a village near Mount Tabor had "moved a distance of four miles." Other sources reported a tsunami in the Mediterranean Sea, several days of aftershocks in Damascus, and towns swallowed up in the earth. The town of Umm el-Qanatir and its ancient synagogue were destroyed.

Historical sources describe how the death toll in Jerusalem numbered in the thousands. Many buildings, among them the Al-Aqsa Mosque, were severely damaged. However, some caveats are required. The view of the severity of the damage caused by the 749 quake is contested by new research. Earlier claims that the large Umayyad administrative buildings south of the Al-Aqsa Mosque were so badly damaged that they were abandoned and used as stone quarries and sources of lime, lime kilns being found at the site, are reportedly wrong, the buildings staying in use until the 1033 earthquake. Similarly, the new Arab capital city at Ramla shows only minimal signs of damage.

Agapius of Hierapolis claimed the number of casualties exceeded 100,000, while in the Chronicle of 1234, there were 800 casualties in the fortress of Beit Cubaya, Damascus. In the cities of Judea, Samaria and Galilee, nearly 600 villages altogether were severely affected. A tsunami-like event was reported in the Dead Sea and probable inundation occurred in its southern basin.

== Religious significance ==
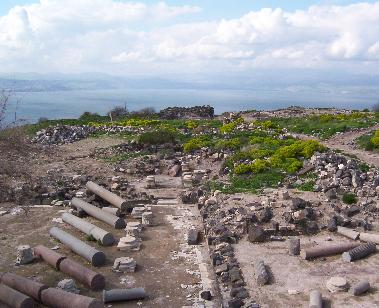
Ruins of Hippos/Sussita

"Ra'ash shvi'it" is mentioned in piyyutim (Jewish liturgical poems). Some rabbis believe the earthquake struck in a Sabbatical year, in which case the translation of the term would be "earthquake of the seventh year."

== Dating issues and primary sources ==
All local and regional earthquake catalogues list one or more earthquakes that affected the Middle East in the mid-8th century, with reported damage in Egypt, Iraq, Jordan, Palestine, and Syria. The primary sources offer multiple year dates for the seismic events, but seismic catalogues of the 1980s and 1990s agreed in attributing all descriptions to an earthquake occurring on 18 January, 749. This reduction was based on two Hebrew texts concerning an earthquake on this date and a commemorative fast.

A different view is that the primary sources describe at least two different seismic events, set apart by up to three years in time and hundreds of kilometers in distance. This is based on comparison of available primary sources on this period.

The first earthquake may have weakened a number of structures, while the second earthquake completed the process and was the immediate cause of their collapse.

=== Byzantine sources ===
The historian Theophanes the Confessor (9th century) is one of the major sources for the 8th century. He lists two earthquakes that affected Palestine and the Levant in the mid-8th century. The first earthquake is dated to 18 January of the year 6238 of the Byzantine calendar (the year 747 in Anno Domini era). Theophanes reports that the earthquake affected Palestine by the Jordan River, and all of Syria. Churches and monasteries reportedly collapsed in the desert of the Holy City (Jerusalem).

Theophanes reports that a second earthquake took place in the year 6241 (749/750 in the Anno Domini system). He does not give an exact date for the event, but the earthquake narrative immediately follows Theophanes' entry on the birth of Leo IV the Khazar. Leo IV was a son of Constantine V and his birth is safely dated to 25 January, 750.

This second earthquake destroyed some cities in Syria, and damaged others. A number of cities reportedly slid down from mountainous positions to "low laying plains". The moving cities reportedly stopped at a distance of about 6 mi (9.7 km) from their original positions. Eyewitness accounts from Mesopotamia reported that the ground was split at a distance of 2 mi (3.2 km). From this new chasm emerged a different type of soil, "very white and sandy". The reports also spoke of a mule-like animal emerging from the chasm and speaking in a human voice.

The distances in Theophanes' account are scaled up. Otherwise this is a credible account of the earthquake causing landslides, surface rupture, and sand boils in a semi-arid area. Such events would be more common during the year's wet season. The only clearly fantastical element of the narrative is the talking animal.

Theophanes is thought to have used as his source a Melkite chronicle written c. 780 in Palestine, and later transported by monks who fled religious persecution in Palestine. Theophanes' information on Iraq and North Syria may have been based on local sources using the Seleucid era, but which had started their counting from the Spring of 311 BC, rather than the Fall of 312 BC. A resulting transcription error may explain why Theophanes dates his second earthquake to 750 rather than 749.

Nikephoros I of Constantinople (9th century) gives a nearly identical description of the 750 earthquake. The 747 earthquake is not described in the currently extant text of Theophanes, though this may be due to a lacuna in the relevant section of the manuscript.

The 747 earthquake is described in the Great Chronographer and the Minor Chronicles, while events connected to the 750 earthquake are depicted there among a series of "wondrous events" which followed the birth of Leo IV. Accounts of both earthquakes appear in other chronicles, such as those written by Paul the Deacon (8th century), Anastasius Bibliothecarius (9th century), and George Kedrenos (12th century).

Both earthquakes are absent in the chronicles of Eutychius of Alexandria (10th century), Michael Glykas (12th century), and Leo Grammaticus (13th century). George Hamartolos (9th century) repeated verbatim Theophanes' account of the 749/750 earthquake, and only commented on the oracle-like mule. Joannes Zonaras (14th century) dates the earthquake as having followed the fall of Germanikeia (modern Kahramanmaraş) at the hands of Constantine V. This siege event is dated to 745/746 by Theophanes.

=== Muslim sources ===
Al-Suyuti reports on two distinct earthquakes events which damaged Jerusalem and Damascus. The first event can be dated to Hijri year 130 (747/748 Anno Domini), and the second to Hijri year 131 (748/749). Al-Suyuti uses as a primary source the narrative of historian Abdalla al-Katir (8th–9th century), as transmitted by al-Wadai (14th century).

This narrative reports that Damascus was affected by an earthquake in Hijri year 130, which led the inhabitants of the city to abandon it. The poultry market of Damascus collapsed under fallen rocks. In Hijri year 131, a second earthquake split the roof of the mosque. The open sky was visible from the interior of the mosque. A subsequent earthquake closed the crack in the roof of the mosque.

The historian Sibt ibn al-Jawzi (13th century) gives a hesitant and possibly confused account of this earthquake. Ibn Taghribirdi (15th century) reports that multiple strong earthquakes affected Syria in Hijri year 130. Jerusalem was reportedly heavily damaged, while Damascus was abandoned for a period of 40 days. The population of Damascus fled to desolate areas.

Mukadassi (10th century) reported that an earthquake in the days of the Abbasid Caliphate (750–1258) threw down the sanctuary, with the exception of the part surrounding the mihrab. His narrative has been connected to the 750 earthquake event. In 750, Marwan II of the Umayyad Caliphate died and the Abbasid dynasty succeeded him. The Commemoratium de Casis Dei (c. 808), compiled by agents of Charlemagne, mentions that the Church of Maria Nea was still in ruins following its destruction in an earthquake. This may be the 750 earthquake or a subsequent earthquake of the early Abbasid era.

Arab reports of one or two earthquakes appear in two 11th-century compilations of traditional accounts of the Abd el Rahman family of Jerusalem. The compilers were the cousins al-Wasiti and Ibn al-Murajja. Based on their accounts, the earthquakes damaged the eastern and western parts of the Al-Aqsa Compound in Jerusalem. Repairs were ordered by Al-Mansur (reigned 754–775) when he visited Jerusalem in Hijri year 141 (757/758 Anno Domini). The Al-Aqsa Mosque was repaired by 757, but then damaged by a new earthquake. It was repaired again by order of Al-Mahdi (reigned 775–785), following his visit in Jerusalem at Hijri year 163.

One of the traditions preserved by Ibn al-Murajja reports that the first earthquake took place during the Ramadan of Hijri year 130 (in May), during a cold and rainy night. A crack appeared in the mosque, but supposedly closed immediately by order of Heaven. Muslim literature often associated earthquake narratives with the holy month of Ramadan, so the offered date may have been chosen to make the story seem more reliable.

Another traditional account from Jerusalem appeared in several later chronicles. It reported that there was earthquake damage across Syria (Bilad al-Sham), but places its emphasis on destruction in Jerusalem itself. It also reported injuries to the descendants of Shadad ibn Aus, one of the companions of the Islamic prophet Muhammad.

=== Eastern Christian sources ===
There are four major Syriac chronicles which mention damage from earthquakes, though they may not all be describing the same events. The first chronicle was the Zuqnin Chronicle, mistakenly attributed to Dionysius I Telmaharoyo (9th century), but currently thought to have been written by an anonymous 9th-century monk of the Zuqnin Monastery. The second was the chronicle of Elijah of Nisibis (11th century), the third was the chronicle of Michael the Syrian (12th century), and the fourth and last was the Chronicle of 1234 (13th century).

There is some dating confusion. The chronicles all follow the Seleucid era calendar, but use two different reckonings of the era (the Babylonian and Macedonian versions). They all cover the second earthquake described by Theophanes. The only one who provides a specific chronology for the event was Elijah of Nisibis, who reports that the earthquake actually started in year 1059 of the Seleucid era and ended in year 1060 of the same era (Spring 748 and Spring 749). He counted spring as the start of the year.

The Chronicle of 1234 dates the earthquake to year 1060 of the Seleucid era. Michael the Syrian offers no clear date, though a 19th-century translator noted in a footnote that the event could be dated to 6241 Anno Mundi, year 1060 of the Seleucid era, and year 749/750 Anno Domini. The dating was reportedly off by a year, since Michael's chronicle includes many chronological errors. It is unclear whether Michael himself was responsible for the errors, or whether they were introduced by copyists of the chronicle. The Zuqnin Chronicle dated the earthquake to year 1059 of the Seleucid era.

None of the four Chronicles dates the event to 18 January. The date would nearly coincide with the Feast of Mary for the Seeds (blessing of the crops), one of the principal feasts of Mary, mother of Jesus in the Syrian tradition. It was celebrated on 15 January. In 749, the feast occurred on a Sunday, and so it would be celebrated a day or two following the actual date.

The Zuqnin Chronicle mentions only one locality damaged by the earthquake, Maboug (modern Manbij). It also mentions vaguely damage in the Western region. In the Syriac Orthodox Church, the western region referred to the ecclesiastic province centered in Antioch, as opposed to the eastern region which was the ecclesiastic province centered in Tikrit. There was no strictly geographic definition of the ecclesiastic provinces.

The other three chronicles list many localities in Syria which suffered from the earthquake. In the Palestine region, these chronicles mention that the earthquake damaged Tiberias, Mount Tabor, and Jericho. In contrast to the Arab chronicles, they do not mention earthquake damage in Jerusalem. Elijah mentions that a village near Mount Tabor was displaced by the earthquake, but does not mention either damage to the area or human casualties. He also mentions damage in the church of Maboug (Manbij), which was located about 500 km (310 mi) away from Mount Tabor.

Michael the Syrian and the Chronicle of 1234 describe earthquake damage in Northern Syria and the Moab. They list among other damaged localities Ghautah, Dareiya (Darayya), Bosra, Nawa, Derat, Baalbek, Damascus, and Beit Qoubaye. Beit Qoubaye has been identified with Koubaiyat (or Al-Qoubaiyat), which was located at the foot of Jebel Akkar, about 45 km (28 mi) southwest of Homs and 25 km (16 mi) south of the Krak des Chevaliers. Their narratives mention no earthquake damage to the coastal cities of the Mediterranean Sea, though they do mention stormy seas and the submersion of a Yemenite coastal fortress. They mention destruction in Tiberias and "lateral displacement of springs" near Jericho.

Based on their descriptions, it is likely that there was a localized tsunami-like storm wave in the Dead Sea. It was caused either by a nearby fault, a massive local slide, or by a temporary halt in the flow of the Jordan River. A change in the flow of the Jordan River may have caused a dam-breaking wave at the inflow of the river to the Dead Sea.

Beyond these chronicles, Agapius of Mendidj (10th century) mentioned both earthquake-induced flooding and inundation along the Syrian coast and destruction in Tiberias. He dates the event to the month of January, but offers no year date for this earthquake. He dates the event to having followed Constantine V incursion into Syria and the conquest of Germanikeia (modern Kahramanmaraş) and to have preceded Abu Muslim's leadership in the Abbasid Revolution (in May 747, or the Ramadan of Hijri year 129). The dating indicates that Agapius was describing the earliest of Theophanes' two earthquakes.

Severus ibn al-Muqaffa (10th century) reports earthquake damage along the Mediterranean coast. The earthquake was felt strongly in Egypt, but reportedly the only Egyptian city which was damaged was Damietta. He otherwise reports the destruction of 600 towns and villages between Gaza and the farthest extremity of Persia (Iran). He names none of the damaged localities, He claims that the earthquake harmed no Orthodox churches or monasteries. Severus also reports that many ships were lost at sea due to the earthquake.

Severus gives the date of the earthquake as 21 Tuba (17 January), on the day of the Dormition of the Mother of God. In the tradition of the Coptic Orthodox Church of Alexandria, the Dormition was celebrated between 16 and 18 January, unlike the tradition of the Byzantine church which celebrated the Dormition on 15 August.

Severus gives no exact year for the earthquake, but in his narrative the earthquake is connected to the imprisonment and release of Pope Michael I of Alexandria, and a Nubian incursion into Egypt. These events were dated by Severus to Hijri year 130 (747/748 in Anno Domini). The date may be off by a year, as his description of events before and after the earthquake contains chronological errors.

George Elmacin (13th century) and the Chronicon orientale attributed to Ibn al-Rāhib (13th century) both report widespread destruction of cities by the earthquake, and loss of life either in the ruins or due to flooding in the coasts. But they do not mention specific localities. They date the event to Hijri year 120 or to the year 460 of the Diocletian era. The dates are incompatible as the Hijri year corresponds to year 737/738 Anno Domini and the Diocletian year corresponds to year 744/745 Anno Domini. They both connect the earthquake's dates to the year of ascension of Pope Michael I. They give the year of Michael's ascent in the throne as 737 Anno Domini, while it has been dated to 743 Anno Domini by other sources. Both texts contain other errors in the chronology of the Patriarchs of Alexandria.

The chronicle of Mekhitar of Ayrivank (13th century) mentions an earthquake taking place in 751 Anno Domini, during the reign of Constantine V. He does not connect this earthquake to 18 January, the date in which the Armenians of the Holy Land celebrate Christmas.

=== Samaritan sources ===
There are earthquake reports in two sources from a community of Samaritans, located near Nablus. They do not mention any earthquake damage in Jerusalem, which was located about 50 km (31 mi) from Nablus. Samaritans reject the sanctity of Jerusalem, and their holy place is Mount Gerizim, located near Nablus. The lack of information on Jerusalem in Samaritan sources may reflect the community's lack of interest in the city or even their disdain for it.

An earthquake narrative appears in the Chronicle Adler, which is a compilation of older reports. The earthquake narrative also appears in some expanded versions of the chronicle of Abu'l-Fath al-Samiri (14th century). The original version of the chronicle ended with the rise in power of Muhammad, but was then expanded to bring it up to date.

Abu'l-Fath wrote his chronicle in 1355, following a discussion he had with a High Priest over the absence of texts on the history of the Samaritans. He used as sources currently extinct Samaritan texts, and also historical materials he gathered from Damascus and Gaza City.

His chronicle places a great earthquake during the reign of Marwan II (reigned 744–750), which was supposedly felt everywhere. Houses collapsed and buried their inhabitants in ruins. Numerous people perished due to the earthquake. It was reportedly unpreceded in scale. The earth continued to shake for many days, and the survivors of the earthquake stayed out in the open until the tremors stopped.

Abu'l-Fath dated this earthquake in Hijri year 131 (748/749 in Anno Domini). The chronicle however contains a chronological error in placing the revolt of Abu Muslim as an event immediately following the earthquake. The revolt is known from other sources to have started in the Ramadan of 747.

=== Jewish sources ===
An account of the earthquake appeared in "Seventh earthquake", a piyyut (liturgical poem) used in synagogues. Liturgical poems such as this were used in place of fixed prayers on special religious occasions. The piyyut literary form was widespread in Palestine since the time of Talmud. The literary structure and style of a piyyut did not change much over the centuries. The date of composition of "Seventh earthquake" can not be deduced by use of either its literary form or its language.

A second Jewish narrative of the earthquake appears in a book of prayers compiled in the 10th or 11th century. It was found in the Cairo Geniza.

The piyyut poem in question is a lament for an earthquake which caused widespread destruction and extensive casualties in Tiberias. It speaks of "fear" and "dark chaos" in Tiberias. The poem also reports that the Sharon plain was flooded due to the same earthquake.

In modern history, the Sharon plain is the name exclusively used for the central section of the Israeli coastal plain. An older geographic sense is reported by Eusebius (4th century), who used the term for a section of the Jordan Valley and the Yizrael Valley. This section covered the area between Mount Tabor and Tiberias.

The narrative poem reports that disaster befell "the city", with both the old and the young perishing. From the context it is unclear whether the poem is still speaking of Tiberias, or whether it instead reported earthquake damage in Jerusalem as well. In language, the poem evokes a section of the Book of Habakkuk. The section in the ancient book describes an earthquake as "wrath" which marches through the land in indignation.

The poem repeatedly mentions a commemorative fast about the earthquake. It dates the fast to the 23rd day of the month Shevat. It is unclear whether the "seventh" in the title refers to the seventh shock of a singular earthquake or the seventh earthquake in a wider series of events. If may reflect a traditional narrative with no other surviving texts.

The poem has been tentatively dated as composed between the 10th and the 12th century. In this period Tiberias was damaged by two other earthquakes, one taking place in 1033/1034 and the other in 1202. By the end of the 11th century, Tiberias' Jewish population was very small. Damage to the city at that time is considered unlikely to have triggered a nationwide day of fasting. It has been suggested that the poem depicts the 1033/1034 earthquake. However the fast was supposedly mentioned in passing by Pinneas the Poet, who was considered an "ancient" writer in a text dating to the 10th century. This led to a theory that the earthquake of the poem took place between the 7th and the 9th century, following the Muslim conquest of the Levant.

Due to an assumption that the narrative poem alludes to a sabbatical year (the seventh year), the earthquake must have taken place in a sabbatical year. The only known earthquakes to fit this theory are the earthquakes of 712/713 and 747/748. There are little surviving details about the earlier of the two earthquakes, leading theorists to reject it as unimportant. The theory suggested that the earthquake of the poem took place on 23 Shevat (28 January) of 748 AD. This seems to be identical to the earthquake dated to Hijri year 130 (747/748 Anno Domini) in other sources.

The Cairo depository source reports that the earthquake affected the Land of Israel, with many cities falling into ruins. Among the dead people in the ruins were reportedly sages, and the pious, and the just. The Cairo source specifically claims that Jerusalem was damaged by this earthquake.

The Jewish text is thought to include an alphanumeric code in the style of gematria. An early attempt to decode it resulted in an implied date for the earthquake suggested in the text. It supposedly took place in the 679th year following the Siege of Jerusalem (70 Anno Domini) and the destruction of the Second Temple. This translates to year 749 Anno Domini, with the 23 Shevat taking place on 17 January. This can be identified with the first of the two earthquakes mentioned by Theophanes. However 749 was not a sabbatical year.

A mint condition coin dated to Hijri year 131 (748/749 Anno Domini) was found underneath seismic ruins in Beit She'an. This archaeological find was used to estimate that an earthquake took place at about that year. The last hoard of coins found in Capernaum dates to 744 and was found underneath collapse rubble. Lending further support to the idea of an earthquake. Alternatively however, the cities may have been damaged by order of Marwan II who is thought to have demolished fortifications in Jerusalem, Damascus, and Baalbek in a punitive campaign. These cities were supportive of his enemies. The demolition of the fortications could have weakened nearby buildings.

It is unclear whether the piyyut was actually referring to a specific historical earthquake. There are other liturgical poems which use earthquakes as part of allegorical narratives. The poem could actually predate the 7th century and speak of a different earthquake. The decoding of the gematria is also questionable, since there are actually several different conversion codes. The figure of 679 years only reflects the method originally used, and can be altered if using a different conversion method.

== See also ==
- List of earthquakes in the Levant
- List of historical earthquakes
- 1033 Jordan Rift Valley earthquake – A similar-sized earthquake affecting the same region

== Bibliography ==
- Karcz, Iaakov (2004), "Implications of some early Jewish sources for estimates of earthquake hazard in the Holy Land", Annals of Geophysics, 47: 759–792
