= Deir Qeruh =

Ruins of Byzantine-period village

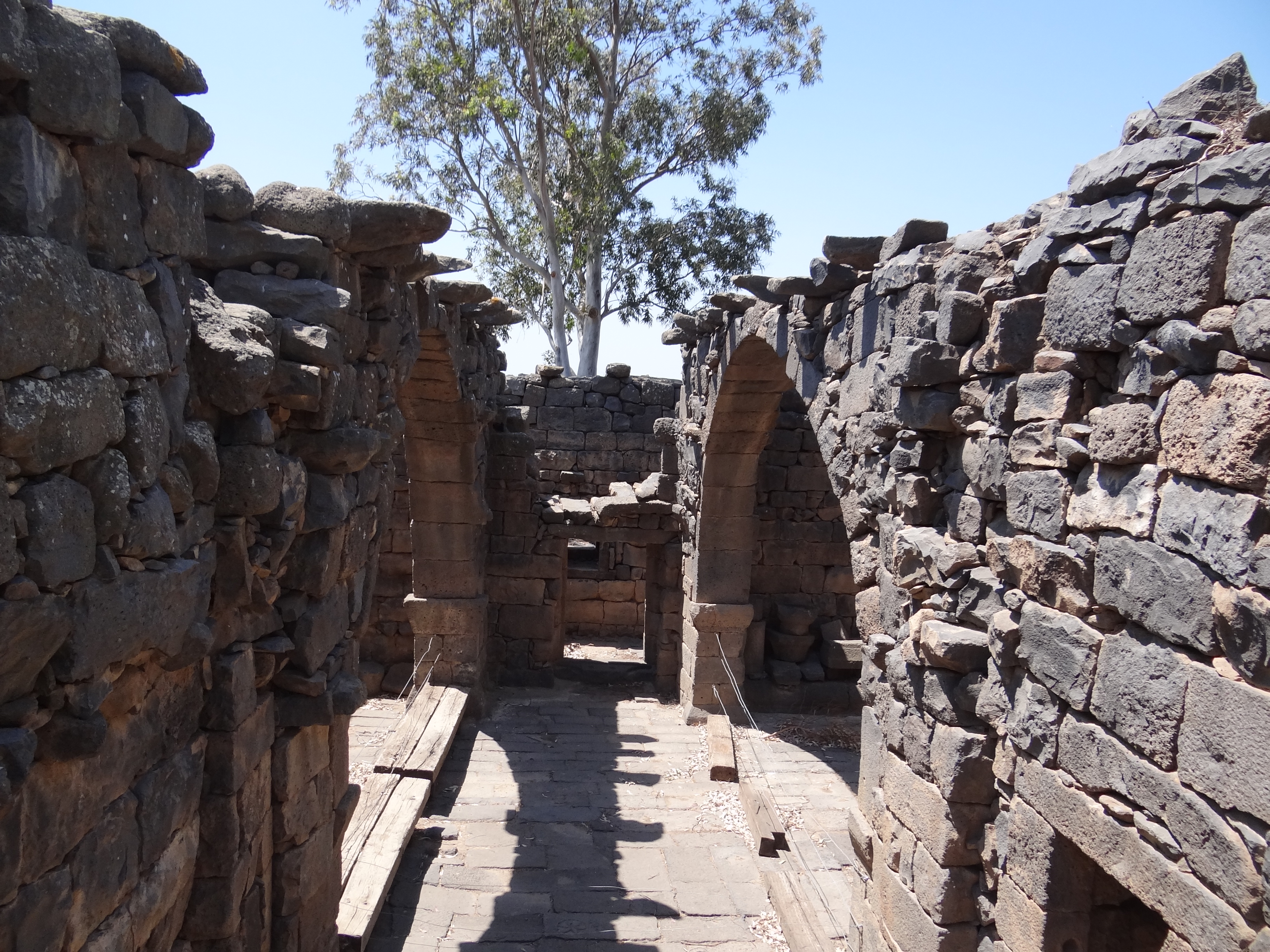
Deir Qeruh church: the nave with the door at its western end

Deir Qeruh (Arabic: دير قروح, 'Monastery of Qeruḥ'; Hebrew: דיר קרוח) is a ruined Byzantine-period village in the Golan Heights, located within an Israeli national park, the Gamla nature reserve.

The village was located near Gamla, a much older fortified town. Deir Qeruh was founded in the 4th century CE, and a church and monastery were built there in the 6th century. The village was abandoned in the mid-7th century following the Arab conquest, and inhabited again during the 13th and 14th centuries, in the Mamluk period. A modern Syrian village rose at the site in the 20th century, and was again abandoned after the 1967 Six-Day War, when it came under Israeli control.

== Monastery and Church of Saint George ==
The north-eastern part of the village is the best preserved, and includes a monastery centered around a church, founded in the 6th century and dedicated to Saint George, who is mentioned on the lintel at the church entrance. The church has a square apse — a feature known from ancient Syria and Jordan, but not present in churches west of the Jordan River. After the abandonment of Deir Qeruh in the seventh century and the later resettlement of the site, the monastic complex was used for other purposes.

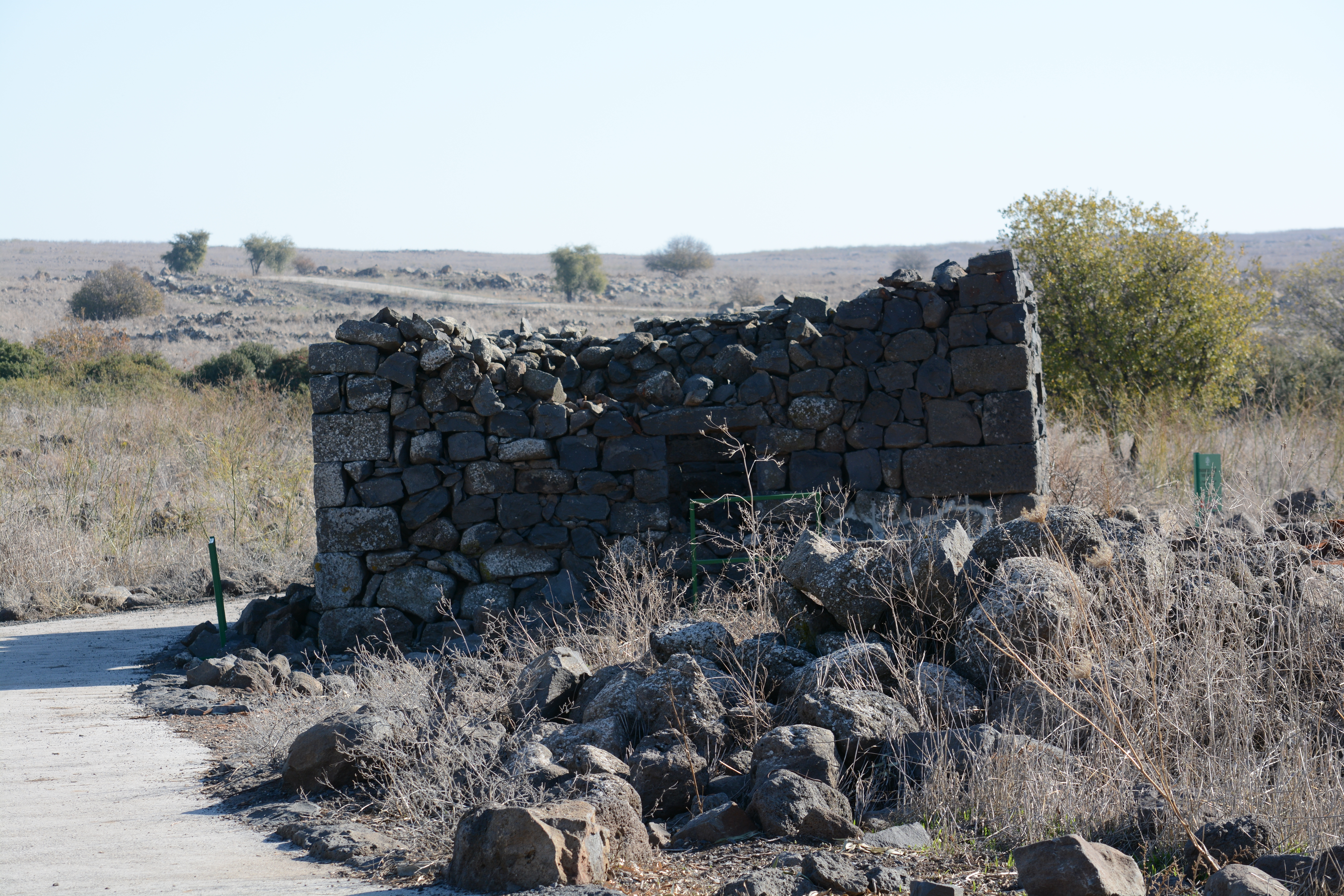
Deir Qeruh, remains of a house

== Bibliography ==
- Ma'oz, Zvi Uri: Deir Qeruh, 1983, in "Hadashot Arkheologiyot - Excavations and Surveys in Israel" 2: 23–25, Israel Antiquities Authority.
- Ma'oz, Zvi Uri: Deir Qeruh, 1993, pp. 348–49 in "The New Encyclopedia of Archaeological Excavations in the Holy Land", 4 volumes, Ephraim Stern (ed.), New York: Simon & Schuster; Jerusalem: Israel Exploration Society & Carta.
