= Gamla Synagogue =

Ancient synagogue in Gamla, Golan Heights

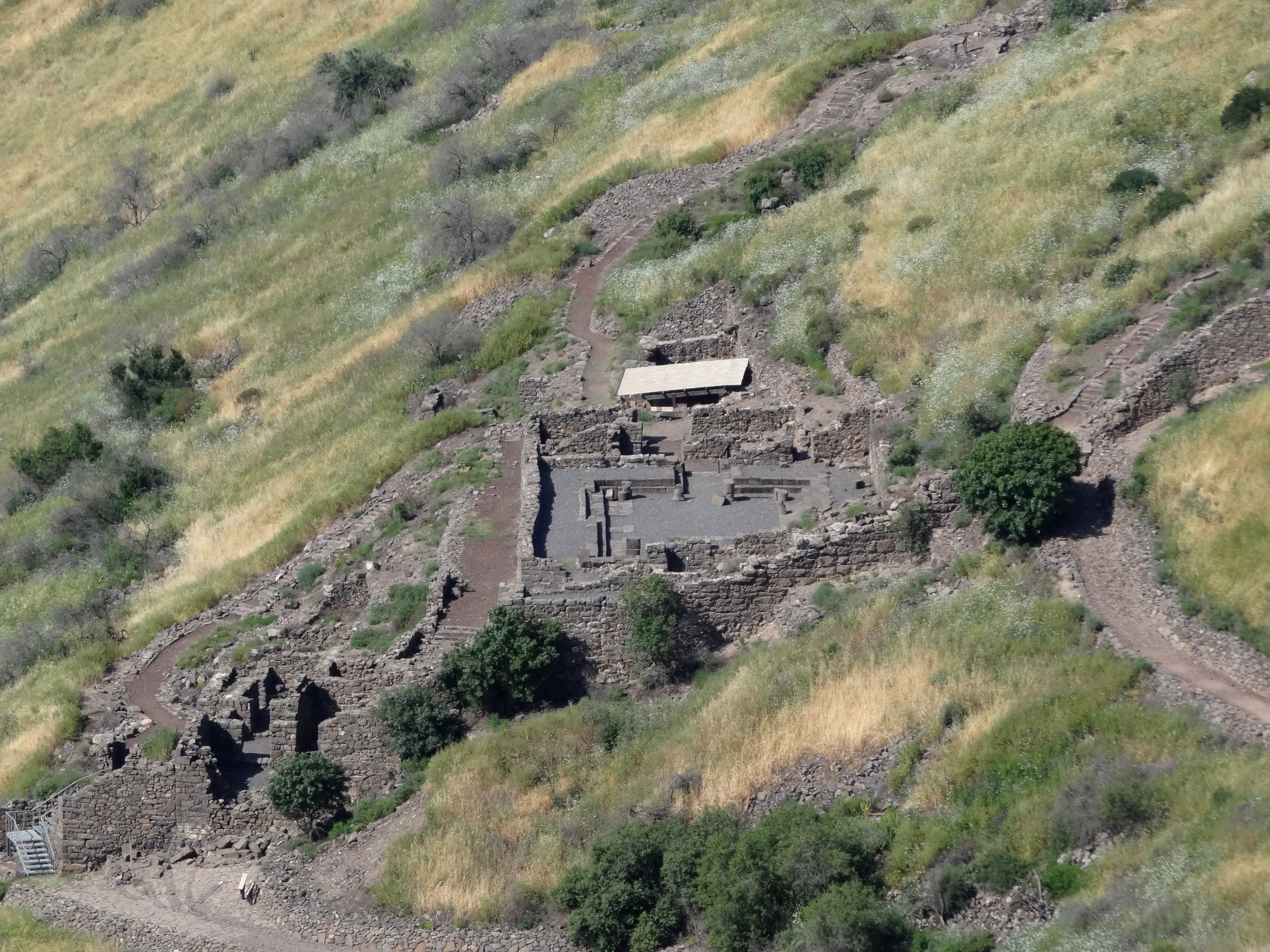
- The surviving remains of the former synagogue

- Location of the ancient former synagogue in the Golan Heights

Religion
- Affiliation: Judaism (former)
- Ecclesiastical or organizational status: Ancient synagogue; Archaeological site
- Status: Ruins

Location
- Location: Gamla, Golan Heights
- Country: Golan Heights
- Interactive map of Gamla Synagogue
- Coordinates: 32°54′10″N 35°44′26″E

Architecture
- Completed: c. 1st century BCE
- Destroyed: 67 CE

Specifications
- Direction of façade: Southeast (Note: Another source claims it is oriented towards the southwest.)
- Length: 25.5 m (84 ft)
- Width: 17 m (56 ft)
- Materials: Dressed stone

Site notes
- Excavation dates: 1976–1978
- Archaeologists: Shmarya Guttman

The Gamla synagogue is an ancient former Jewish synagogue, located in the ancient Jewish city of Gamla on the western slope of the Golan Heights, approximately 18 km (11 mi) northeast of Lake Kinneret, in Israel. The synagogue was built between the 1st century BCE and the 1st century CE.

It is the oldest synagogue discovered to date. It was found by archaeologist Shmarya Guttman in 1976.

== History ==
The synagogue was discovered during archaeological excavations from 1976 to 1978 in the eastern part of the city of Gamla. It adjoined the outer fortress wall.

The synagogue was built of dressed stone and had a rectangular plan of 25.5 by 17 m (84 by 56 ft). It is characterized by columned passages and a surrounding Doric colonnade with heart-shaped corner columns. The entrance to the synagogue was through double doors located on the southwest side.

There were four rows of stone benches along the walls. Pillars in the center of the hall supported the roof. This layout of the hall is typical of synagogues in Galilee. In the courtyard, wide steps led down to the mikveh. Although most synagogues were built with their doors facing Jerusalem, the Gamla synagogue had its door facing southeast, probably due to the difficult terrain.

The synagogue was destroyed by the Romans (67 CE) and the site was not inhabited after that.

The synagogue, which was in use until the destruction of the Second Temple (70 CE), is an important piece of historical debate about the earliest date of synagogue construction. It was previously thought to have been built in the 1st century BCE. It is the oldest synagogue in Israel. Steven Fine believes that it was built after 40 BCE. In 2012, Uri Zvi Maoz challenged these dates, believing that the synagogue was built around 50 CE. The mikvah, in his opinion, was made only in 67, and was a water cistern earlier.

As part of the reconstruction, scientists created a three-dimensional model of the Gamla synagogue.

== See also ==
- Ancient synagogues in Israel
- Oldest synagogues in the world
