= Gamla nature reserve =

Nature reserve and archaeological site in the center of the Golan Heights

Coordinates: 32°54′22.71″N 35°44′45.65″E

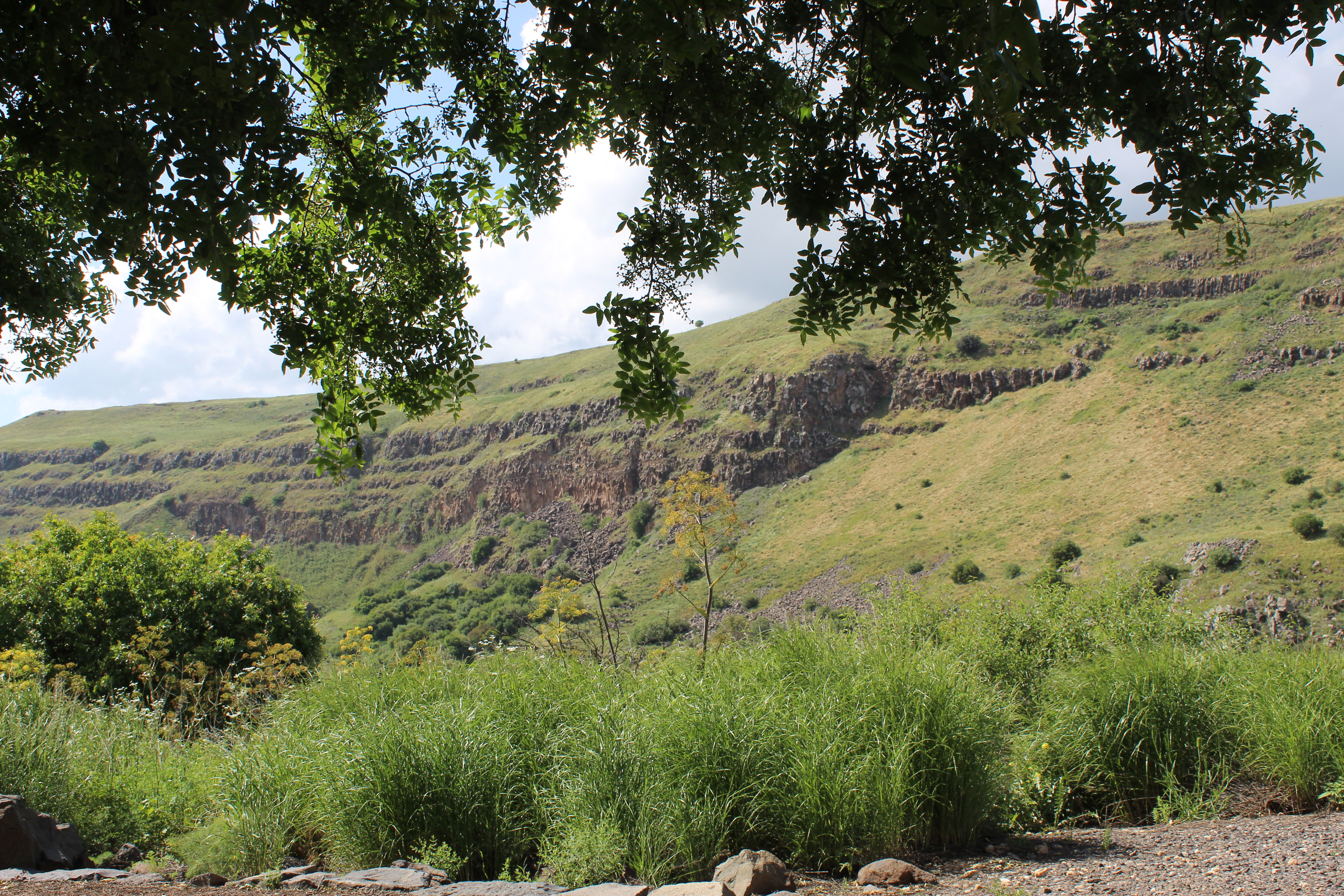
Mountainous terrain near Gamla

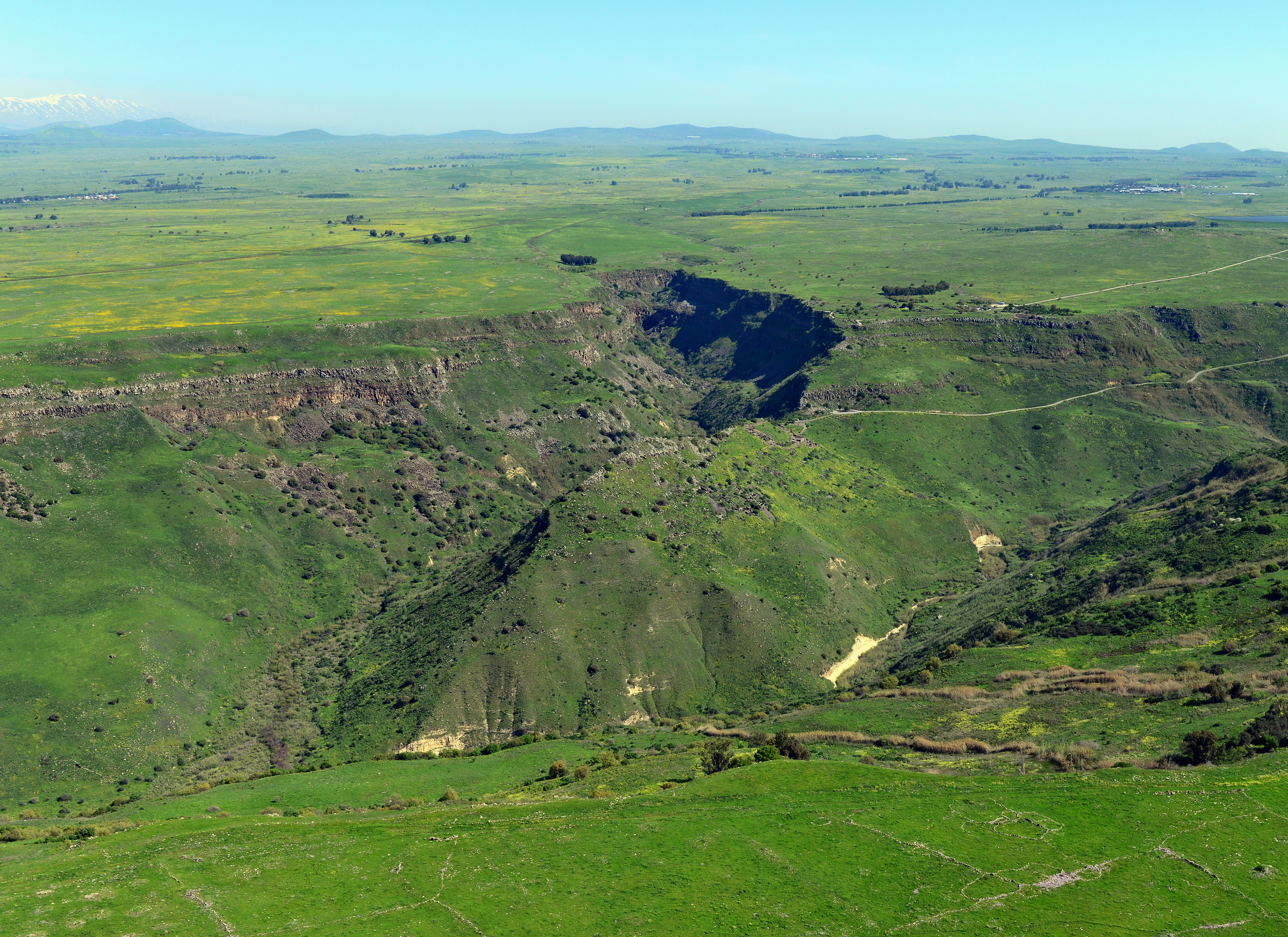
Aerial view

Gamla nature reserve (Arabic: محمية غاملا الطبيعية, romanized: Maḥmiyyat Ghāmlā al-Ṭabīʿiyya) is a nature reserve and archaeological site located in the center of the Golan Heights, about 20 km south to the Israeli settlement of Katzrin. It adjoins the Yehudiya Forest Nature Reserve.

== The nature reserve ==
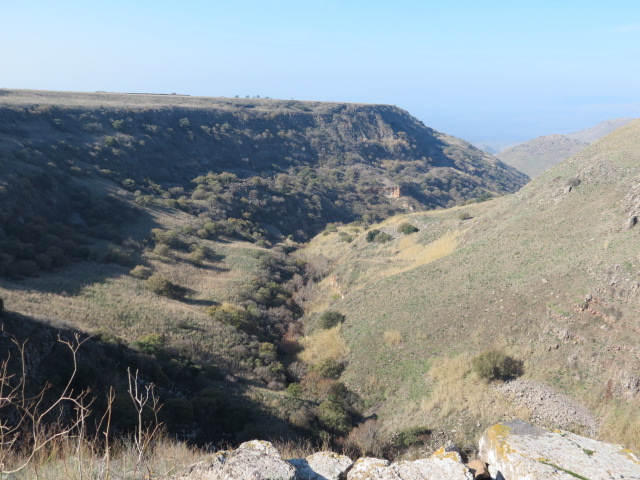
Gamla

The nature reserve stretches along two streams, Gamla and the Daliot, and includes natural and archaeological attractions. Among the former are the largest nesting colony of griffon vultures in Israel, various other birds of prey, among a variety of wildlife and wild plants. Among the latter are the ancient city of Gamla and a Bronze Age dolmen field containing 716 dolmens. At the head of the Gamla stream there is a 51-meter high waterfall, the highest in Israel and the Israeli occupied territories, which dries up during summer and autumn.

The reserve also contains several other sites, such as a memorial monument and the ruins of a Byzantine-period village. The memorial is dedicated to the Jewish Golan Heights settlers who were killed during the Israeli wars and as a result of attacks; the remains of the Christian village from the 4th–7th century CE, known by the Arabic name of Deir Qeruh, include a well-preserved monastery centered around a church with a square apse - a feature known from ancient Syria and Jordan, but not present in churches west of the Jordan River.

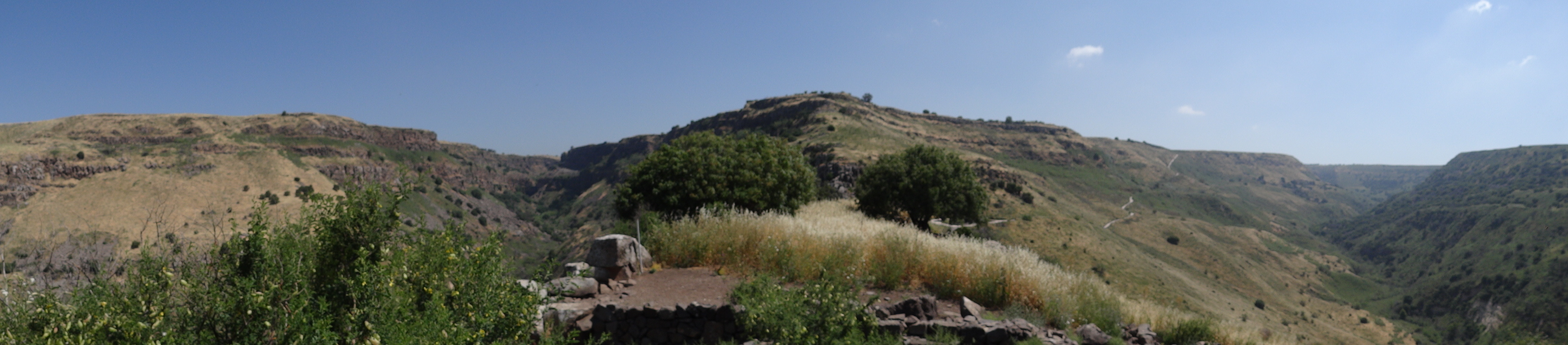

== Vultures population ==
In 2007, vultures perching on the cliffs were poisoned. After the event, 7 younglings were taken to the Carmel until they were healed, after which they were taken to a restorative location. In 2008 a plan was undertaken to restore the vulture population. The vultures eggs are then taken to the Biblical zoo for incubation.

== See also ==
- Gamla
