= Gamla =

Ancient Jewish town in the Golan Heights

- גמלא (Imperial Aramaic)
- Al-Sunâm ("Camel's Hump")
- Location within the Golan Heights
- 32°54′10″N 35°44′26″E
- Type: Ancient fortification and town
- Periods: Hellenistic to Roman Empire
- Location: Golan Heights (Note: Internationally recognized as Syrian territory, occupied by Israel.)

History
- Built: 3rd century BCE
- Abandoned: 67 CE

Site notes
- Material: Basalt
- Excavation dates: 1978–2000
- Archaeologists: Shmarya Guttman, Itzhaki Gal, Zvi Yavor, Danny Syon
- Management: INPA
- Public access: yes
- Website: en.parks.org.il/reserve-park/gamla-nature-reserve

Gamla (Imperial Aramaic: גמלא, lit. 'the camel'), also Gamala, was an ancient Jewish town on the Golan Heights. Believed to have been founded as a Seleucid fort during the Syrian Wars, it transitioned into a predominantly Jewish settlement that came under Hasmonean rule in 81 BCE. The town's name reflects its location on a high, elongated ridge with steep slopes resembling a camel's hump.

Gamla served as a key rebel stronghold during the Great Jewish Revolt against Rome. In the summer of 67 CE, after an extended siege and battle, Roman forces under Vespasian ultimately captured the town and massacred its inhabitants. The Jewish historian Josephus, who accompanied the Roman army, provides detailed accounts of these events in his work, The Jewish War.

The remains of Gamla were discovered in the 1968 survey of the Golan, with geographical features matching Josephus' descriptions. Located approximately 10 kilometers inland from the Sea of Galilee, the town was built on the southeastern slope of Mount Gamla. Archaeological excavations, starting in 1970 and continuing periodically, have unearthed city walls enclosing an area of about 180 dunams, a water conduit system, ritual baths, Herodian lamps, stone vessels, and thousands of Hasmonean coins. One of the earliest synagogues in the Land of Israel, believed to date back to the late 1st century BCE, was discovered near the town wall in 1976.

Due to its historical significance during the revolt, Gamla is a symbol for the modern state of Israel and an important archaeological site. It is located within the Gamla Nature Reserve and is home to various wildlife, including rock hyraxes, wild boars, and numerous species of raptors.

== Etymology ==
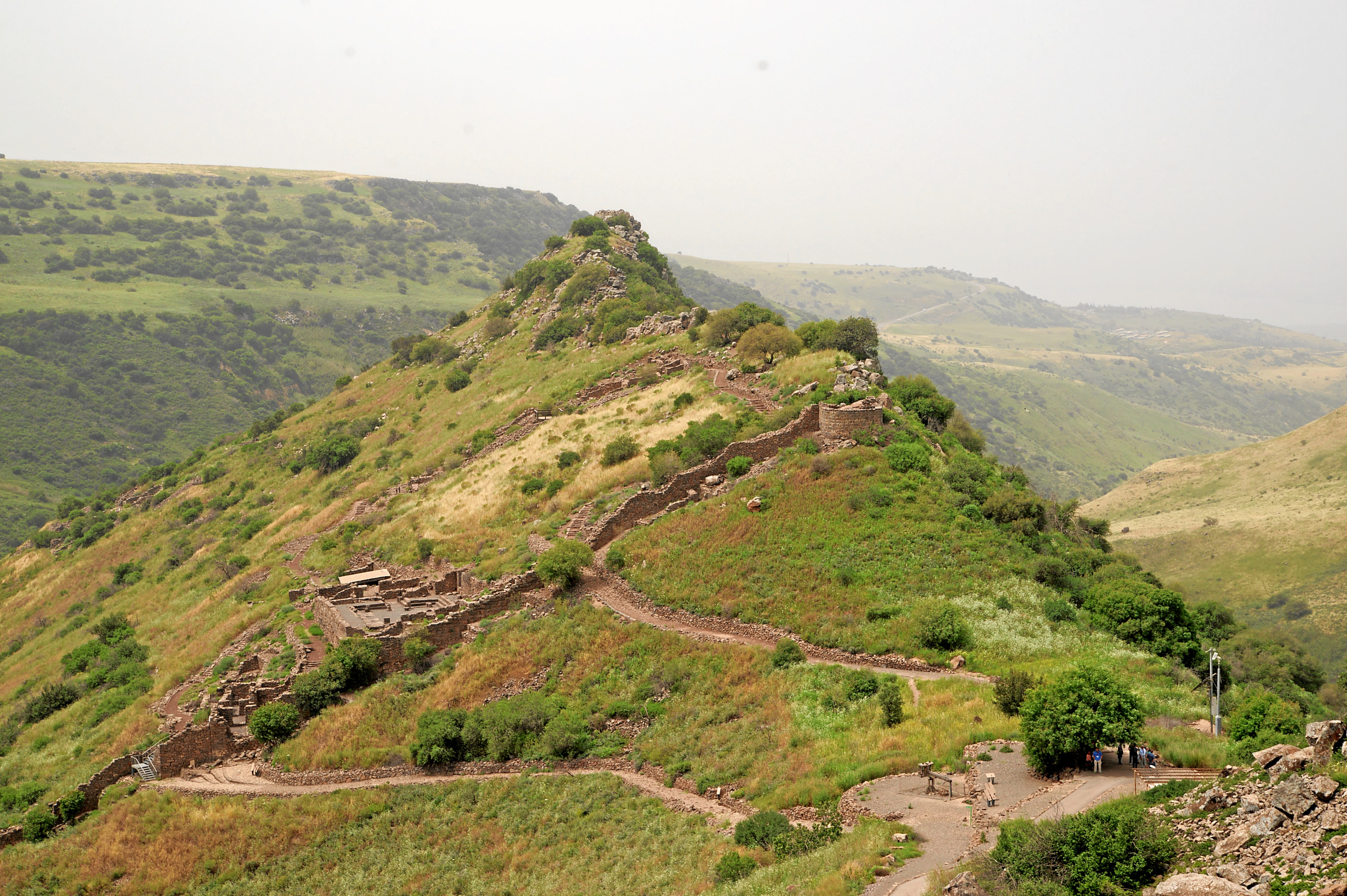
The hill, which resembles a camel in shape, is what gave Gamla its name

Situated at the southern part of the Golan Heights, overlooking the Sea of Galilee, Gamla (meaning 'the camel' in Aramaic) was built on a steep hill shaped like a camel's hump, from which it derives its name.

== History ==
=== Early history ===
Archaeological excavations have shown that in the place of Gamla there was already a settlement in the Early Bronze Age. The settlement was probably agricultural, as archaeologists have found evidence of long-term use of flint sickles. Some of the findings even go back to the Copper Age.

The hill of Gamla remained largely uninhabited from the end of the Early Bronze Age II until the Hellenistic period.

In Rabbinic literature, Gamla is listed among the "walled towns from the time of Joshua." This inclusion could have been influenced by the remains of the Early Bronze Age wall, which were still visible during the Second Temple period.

=== Hellenistic and Hasmonean periods ===
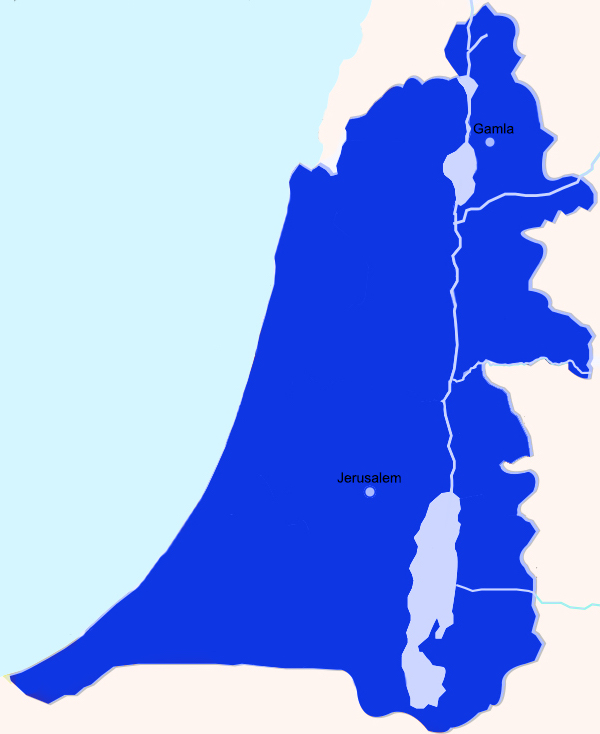
Gamla under the Hasmonean Kingdom

The site became host to a Seleucid fort during the Syrian Wars (3rd century BCE), before later developing into a civilian settlement from the last quarter of the 2nd century BCE. In 81 BCE, it became a part of the Hasmonean state, according to Josephus, in The Jewish War after Alexander Jannaeus captured it from the Seleucid ruler Demetrius Eucaerus.

Scholarly consensus places Jewish settlement in the Golan region, including Gamla, as a consequence of Jannaeus' conquests. The town's name, "Gamla" (Hebrew: גמלא), with a final aleph, may suggest Aramaic-speaking Jewish inhabitants, possibly post-exilic returnees from Babylonian captivity. However, an alternative spelling used in the Jerusalem Talmud (Hebrew: גמלה) with a final he, may contradict this.

Syon suggests textual and archaeological evidence indicate a Jewish presence in Gamla antedating Jannaeus. This Jewish-majority civilian population likely emerged during the last quarter of the second century BCE, under John Hyrcanus, gradually settling at Gamla alongside a possibly remaining garrison.

=== Roman period ===
The city became famous for producing high-quality olive oil. It was actively developed during the reign of Herod the Great, and later was a disputed area between Herod Antipas and Nabatean King Aretas IV Philopatris.

The Lucilii Gamalae, a prominent family of the elite of Ostia Antica, have been suggested, following Theodor Mommsen, to have originated from Gamla, based on the rare cognomen Gamala. One proposed explanation is that the ancestor of the family was a slave from Gamla who was brought to Italy and took the name of his place of origin; his descendants later rose to prominence in Ostia's civic administration. This migration has been tentatively dated as early as Pompey's conquest of Judaea in 63 BCE.

=== Great Jewish revolt ===
Gamla gained historical significance during the Great Jewish Revolt against Rome as a major rebel stronghold. Initially loyal to the Romans, Gamla turned rebellious under the influence of refugees from other locations, after Philip, son of Yakim, one of Agrippa II's generals, left the town. A man named Joseph, son of the midwife, persuaded the town's elders to revolt. The town grew as it became a haven for refugees fleeing the Roman advance in Galilee. Archaeological evidence, such as hearths and storage jars, confirms the presence of a large population. During the revolt, the town minted its own coins, likely more as propaganda than currency. These coins, bearing the inscription "For the redemption of Jerusalem the H(oly)" in a mixture of paleo-Hebrew (biblical) and Aramaic, have been found in only six instances.

According to Flavius Josephus, who served as the commander of Galilee during the early phases of the revolt, he fortified Gamla by building a city wall. Josephus gives a very detailed topographical description of the city, which he also referred to as Gamala, and the steep ravines which precluded the need to build a wall around it. Only along the northern saddle, at the town's eastern extremity, was a 350 meter-long wall built. It was constructed by blocking gaps between existing houses and destroying houses that lay in its way. It was one of only five cities in the Galilee and Golan that stood against Vespasian's legions, reflecting the cooperation between the local population and the rebels.

The city sustained the first seven-month siege, which was organized in 66 CE by Herod Agrippa II. On October 12, 67 CE a total of about 60 thousand soldiers under the command of Vespasian began a second siege. The inhabitants of the city, including armed rebels, were, according to Josephus, only 9,000 people. Kenneth Atkinson calls this number clearly exaggerated. Nevertheless, Danny Syon writes that before the siege Gamla became a refuge city to which both insurgents from all over the Galilee and residents of the surrounding villages flocked. There were not enough places in the city, and even the Gamla Synagogue was adapted to accommodate refugees.

The seizure of the city was of fundamental importance to Vespasian. According to the existing strategy, it was necessary to seize and suppress all the centers of resistance along the route, however small. In addition, the Jews expected, albeit unreasonably, the possible assistance of Jews from Babylonia and the military intervention of Parthia. Although Josephus, who led the consolidation of the defense of Gamla, describes it as a fortress, archaeological findings show that in fact the walls were constructed in fragments, filling in the gaps between buildings to create a continuous line of fortifications.

Josephus also provides a detailed description of the Roman siege and conquest of Gamla in 67 CE by components of legions X Fretensis, XV Apollinaris and V Macedonica. The Romans first attempted to take the city by means of a siege ramp, but were repulsed by the defenders. Only on the second attempt did the Romans succeed in breaching the walls at three different locations and invading the city. They then engaged the Jewish defenders in hand-to-hand combat up the steep hill. Fighting in the cramped streets from an inferior position, the Roman soldiers attempted to defend themselves from the roofs. These collapsed under the heavy weight, killing many soldiers and forcing a Roman retreat. The legionnaires re-entered the town a few days later, overcoming Jewish resistance and completing the capture of Gamla.

Gamla is often compared with the more famous story of the fortress of Masada, where the defenders, not wanting to surrender to the Romans, committed suicide. Sometimes Gamla is even called the "Northern Masada" or "Masada Golan." However, Danny Syon emphasizes that Masada was a fortress, originally built as a fortification facility, where several hundred families of rebels were hiding and where there was no battle as such. Gamla, in contrast, was a city where fortification was carried out in connection with military operations and where heavy fighting took place before its capture and destruction. According to Josephus, some 4,000 inhabitants were slaughtered, while 5,000, trying to escape down the steep northern slope, either were trampled to death, fell or perhaps threw themselves down a ravine. These numbers appear to be exaggerated and the number of inhabitants on the eve of the revolt has been estimated at 3,000–4,000.

== Identification ==
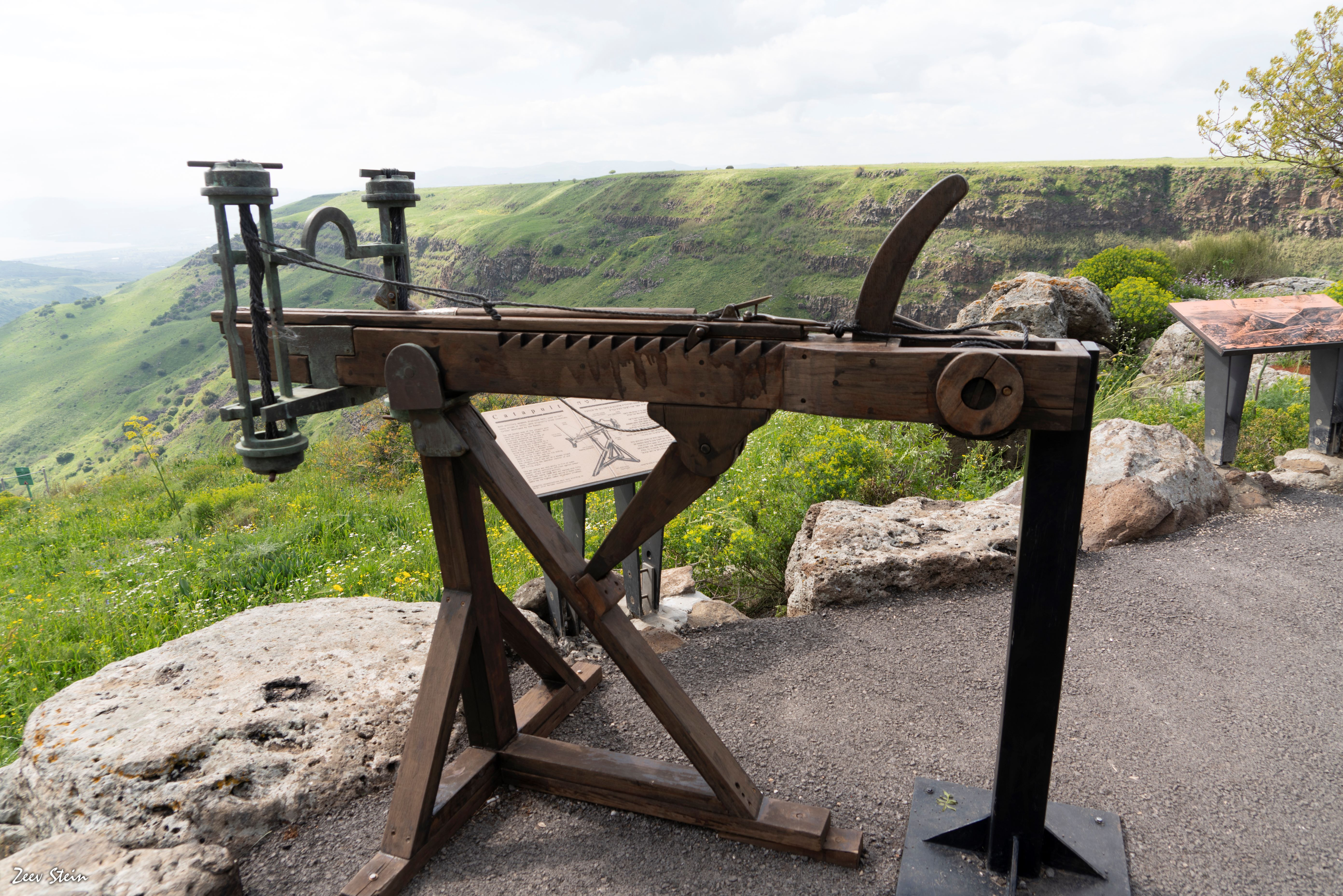
Reconstruction of the Roman ballista in Gamla

The Israel Antiquities Authority (IAA) has, of 1968, taken the position of archaeologist Itzhaki Gal that the ancient site of Gamla is to be identified with the site known as Tell es Salām (shown on map) which, itself, is a corruption of the Arabic word, es-Sanām (the hump). In previous years, the site had been identified with Tell ed-Drāʿ, a place ca. 20 kilometers (12 mi) east of the Sea of Galilee in the Ruqqad river-bed, based on Konrad Furrer's identification of the site in 1889. It was only properly identified in 1968 by Itzhaki Gal, after the Israeli conquest of the Golan Heights during the Six-Day War. The site Tell es Salām was excavated by Shmarya Guttman and Danny Syon on behalf of the Israel Antiquities Authority between 1977 and 2000. The excavations have uncovered 7.5 dunnams, about 5% of the site, revealing a typical Jewish city featuring ritual baths, Herodian lamps, limestone cups and thousands of Hasmonean coins. Additional excavations were carried out on the site in 2008 and 2010, by Haim Ben David and David Adan-Bayewitz on behalf of Bar-Ilan University's Land of Israel Studies Department, and by Danny Syon on behalf of the Israel Antiquities Authority.

With the destruction of the town by the Roman army, Gamla was abandoned, never to be rebuilt. Archaeological excavations there have revealed widespread evidence for the battle that took place at the site. About 100 catapult bolts have been uncovered, as well as 1,600 arrowheads and 2,000 ballista stones, the latter all made from local basalt. This is a quantity unsurpassed anywhere in the Roman Empire. Most were collected along and in close proximity to the wall, placing the heavy fighting in the vicinity and the Roman siegecraft to the north east of the town. Next to a heavy concentration of the stones, the excavators have identified a man-made breach in the wall, probably made by a battering ram.

== Archaeology ==
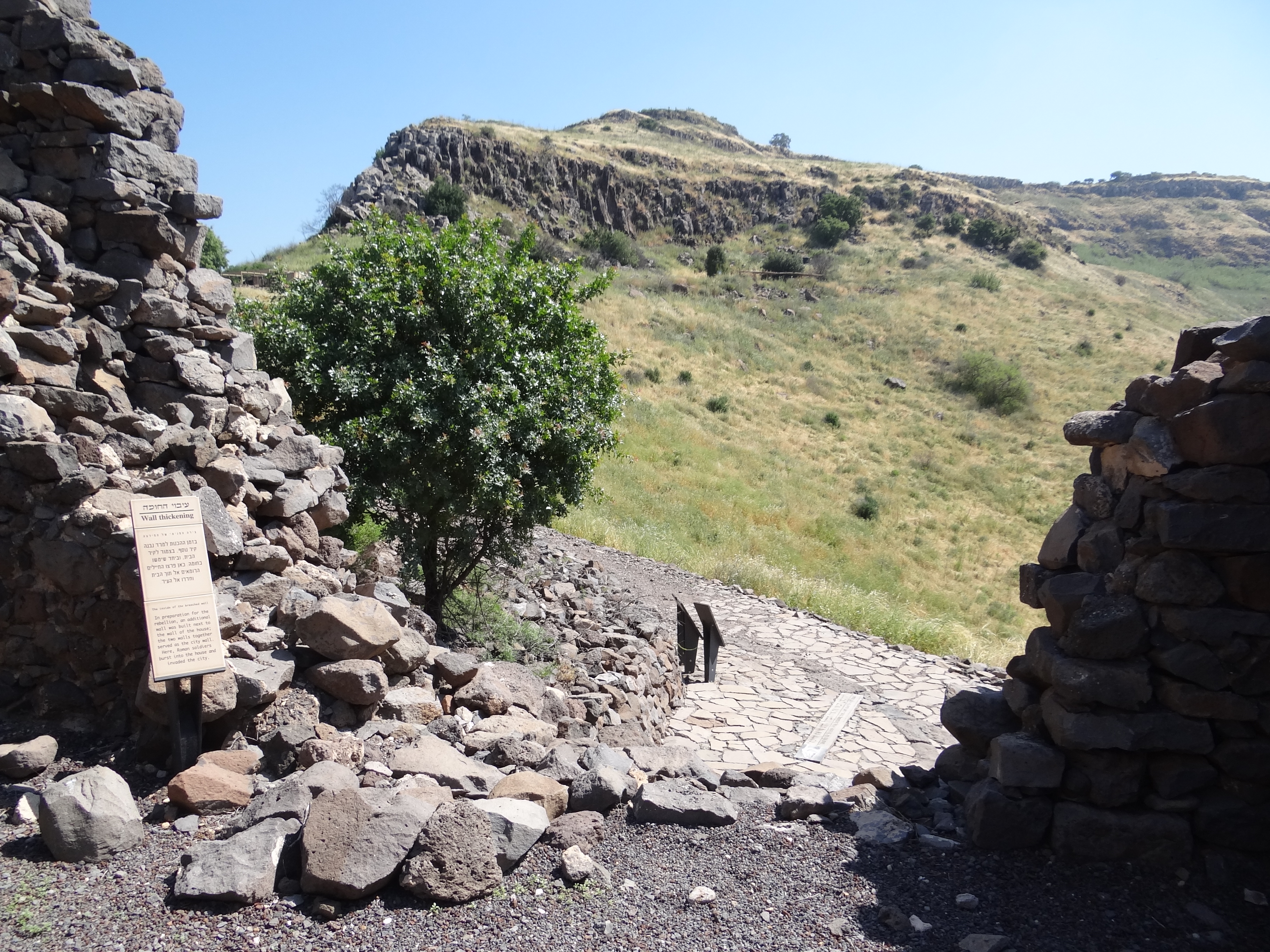
Break in the fortress wall in Gamla

Archaeological finds in Gamla provided historians with a unique opportunity to study Jewish life at the end of the Second Temple period. In particular, studies prove that, although the active development of the Golan began under Alexander Jannaeus, the Jews began to settle here much earlier - at least in the second century BCE. This is shown by the large number of coins of the period of the reign of John Hyrcanus. In addition to coins, a large number of weapons were found in Gamla, a synagogue of the Second Temple period, various ritual objects, many different household items and jewelry.

About 200 artifacts excavated at Gamla have been identified as the remains of Roman army equipment. These include parts of Roman lorica segmentata, an officer's helmet visor and cheek-guard, bronze scales of another type of armor, as well as Roman identification tags.

A Roman siege-hook, used both for stabbing and hooking onto the wall, was found in the breach. Only one human jawbone was identified during the exploration of Gamla, raising questions regarding the absence of human remains despite the widespread evidence of a battle. A tentative answer is discussed by archaeologist Danny Syon, who suggests that the dead would have been buried at nearby mass graves that are yet to be found. One such mass grave has been found at Yodfat, which had suffered the same fate as Gamla at the hands of Vespasian's legions.

Artifacts from Gamla are on the display at the Golan Archaeological Museum in Katzrin, including arrowheads, ballista stones, clay oil lamps and coins minted in the town during the siege. A scale model and film are used to describe the conquest and destruction of the Jewish town and all of its inhabitants.

=== Weapons ===
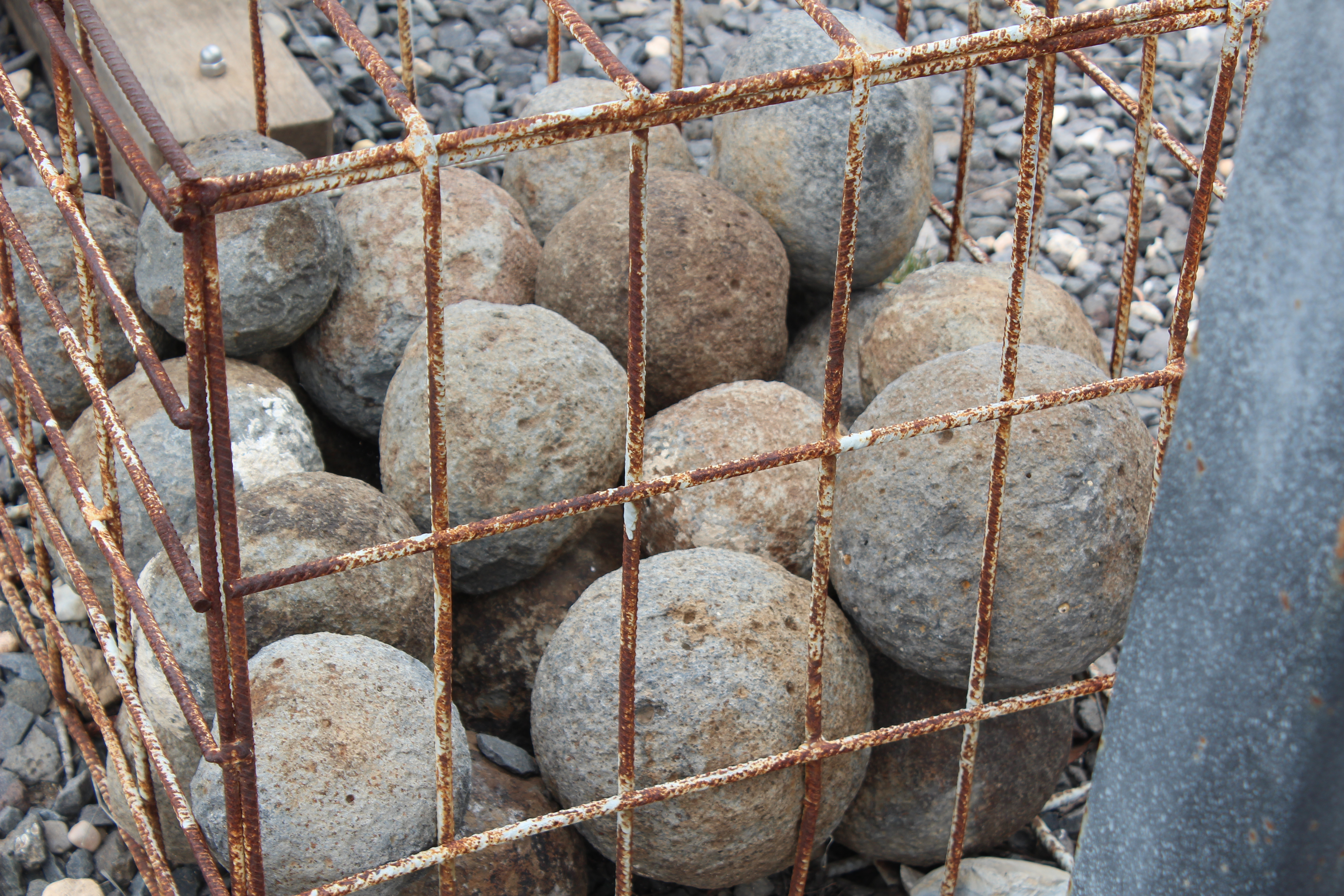
Round shots from Roman ballista collected at Gamla

One of the important successes of archaeologists was the discovery of a huge number of ancient weapons. The number of stone nuclei found in Gamla and arrowheads is a record for finds throughout the Roman Empire. In particular, about 2000 nuclei from basalt, 1600 metal arrowheads, parts of Roman helmets, armor, shields and many other weapons and military supplies were collected.

=== Coins ===
6,314 ancient coins were also found in Gamla, including unique coins of its own coinage. Most of them (6,164) were found during 14 seasons of excavation under the guidance of Guttman (1976–1989), 24 during conservation and restoration work in 1990–1991, and the remaining 126 during the four seasons of excavations conducted by Danny Syon and Zvi Yavor in the years 1997–2000. Another 153 coins from Gamla were subsequently found in the collection by the kibbutz Sasa. Among the found coins:

Period	Amount	Percent
Hasmonean	3,964	62.8%
Phoenician cities	928	14.7%
Seleucid	610	9.7%
Unidentified	419	6.6%
Herodian	304	4.8%
Other	89	1.4%

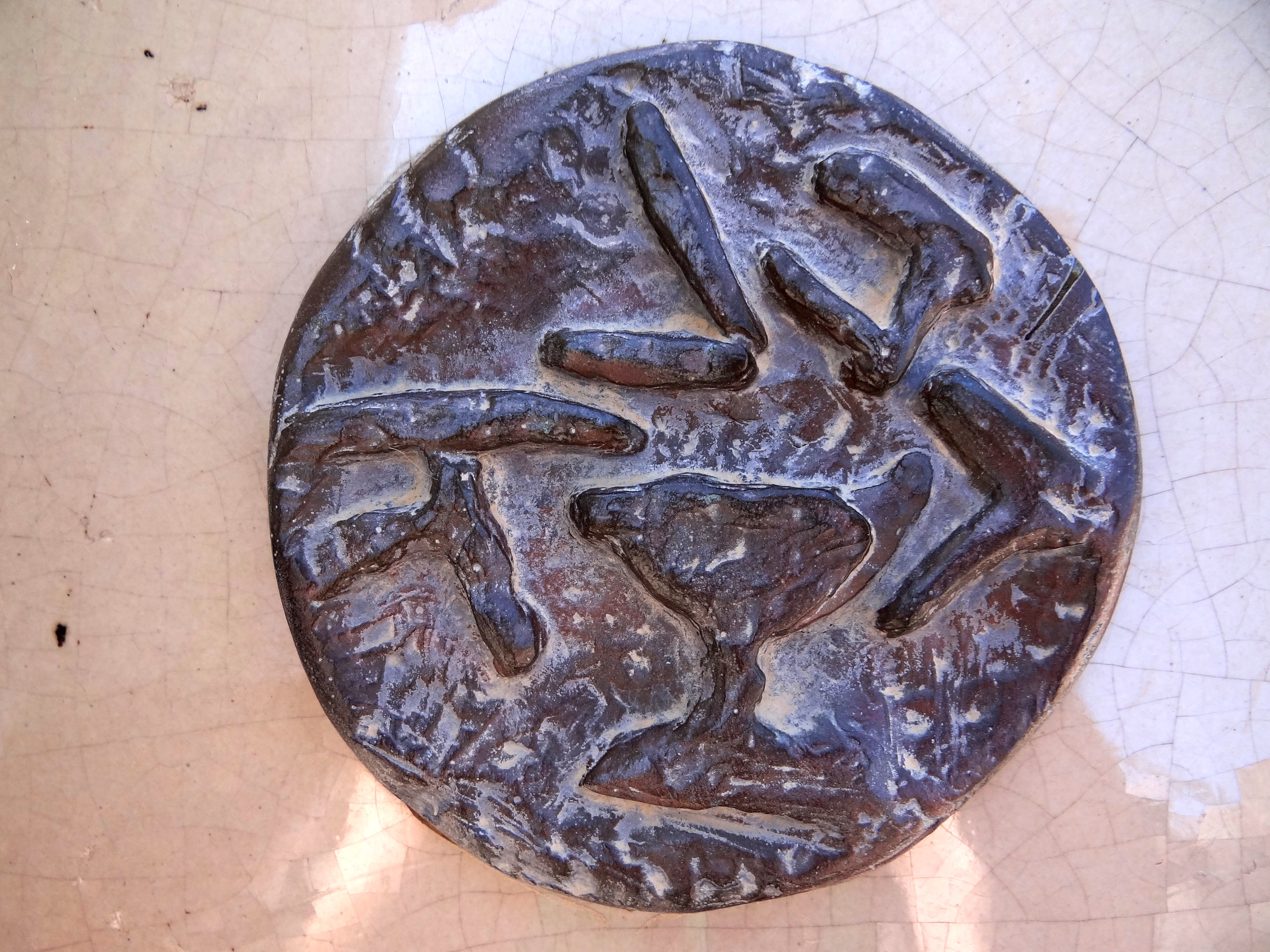
Ancient Gamla coin

In total, 9 Gamla coins from the times of the uprising were found. Of these, 7 were found directly at Gamla, one in Alexandrium, and one from collectors (presumably stolen from Gamla). The Gamla coin, found in Alexandrium, testifies to contacts with the rebels in Galilee. Historians, in particular Dani Zion, Ya'akov Meshorer and David Eidlin, actively discussed the minting of insurgent coins outside of Jerusalem. As Eugene Wallenberg writes, this fact "opens the widest horizons for the historian in studying the social and economic history of the uprising, the study of the Zealots party as an independent and as a self-sufficient political formation." Researchers note the inscriptions on coins were made by craftsmen with low qualification, synthesizing Paleo-Hebrew and Aramaic letters: on one side is the inscription "Deliverance," on the other side, "Holy Jerusalem."

Shmarya Guttman wrote:

I did not understand what moved the defenders of the fortress, until we found a coin minted in the besieged city, on which it was written: "Deliverance to Holy Jerusalem." The defenders of the city believed that by stopping the enemy on the Golan, they would save the Eternal City ... Having conquered Gamla, the Romans went to Jerusalem, and after three years of siege the Eternal City fell.

=== Synagogue ===
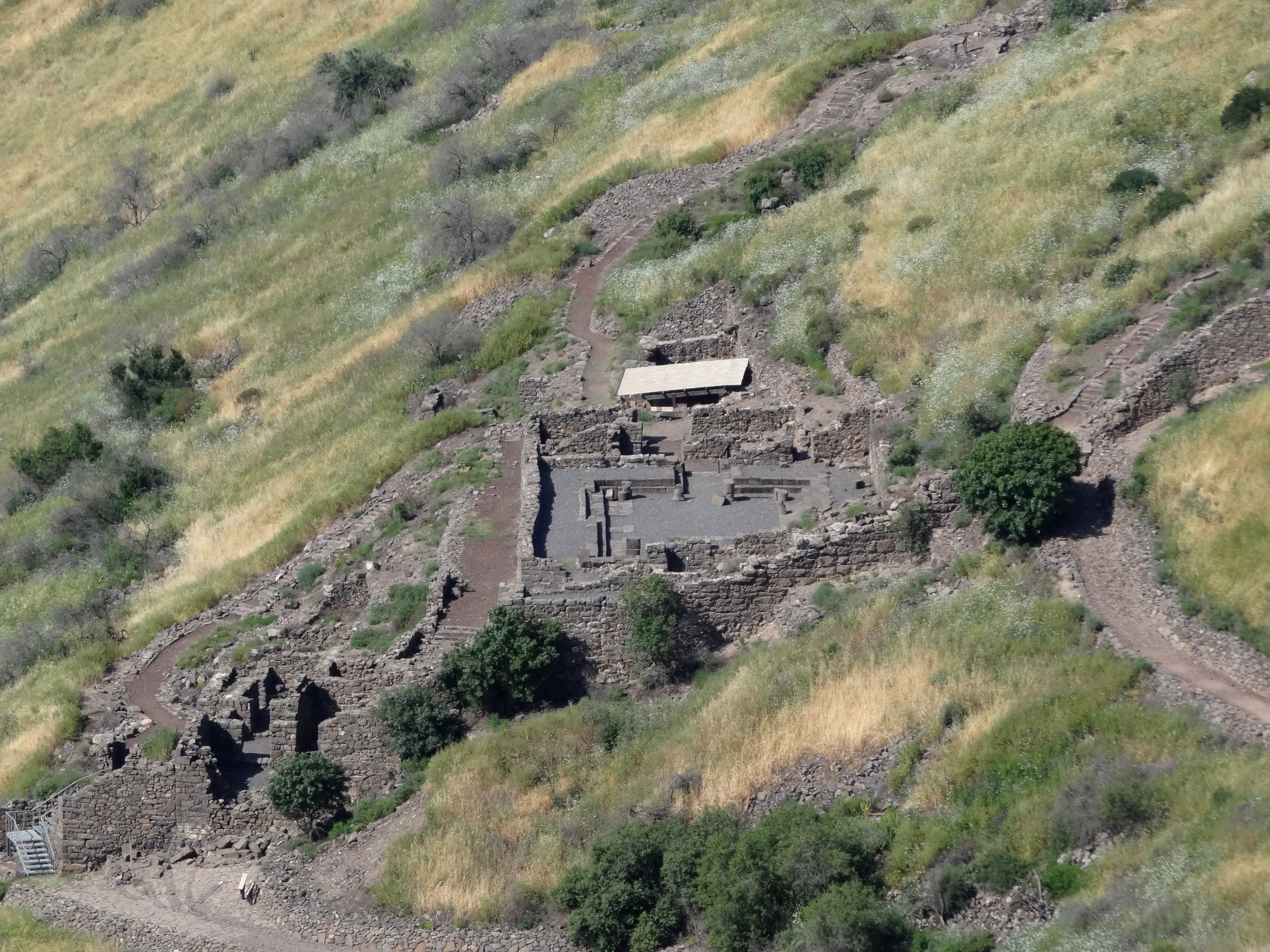
Gamla Synagogue

One of the world's earliest known synagogues was discovered in Gamla, and is believed to date back to the late 1st century BCE. It is possibly the oldest synagogue found in the Roman province of Judaea. Situated within the city's walls, this synagogue, constructed from dressed stone, features a main hall measuring 22 by 17 meters. It is characterized by pillared aisles and a surrounding Doric colonnade, with heart-shaped corner columns. Entry to the synagogue was through twin doors located on the southwest side. A ritual bath was unearthed next to it.

On the eve of Gamla's destruction, the synagogue appears to have been converted to a dwelling for refugees, as testified by a number of meager fireplaces and large quantities of cookpots and storage jars found along its northern wall. Situated next to the city wall, 157 ballista stones were collected from the synagogue's hall alone and 120 arrowheads from its vicinity.

The chronology of the synagogue was challenged by Ma'oz in 2012. His interpretation is that it was built about 50 CE and a mikveh was added in 67 CE. The earlier mikveh was, in Ma'oz understanding, a water cistern.

== Present-day Gamla ==
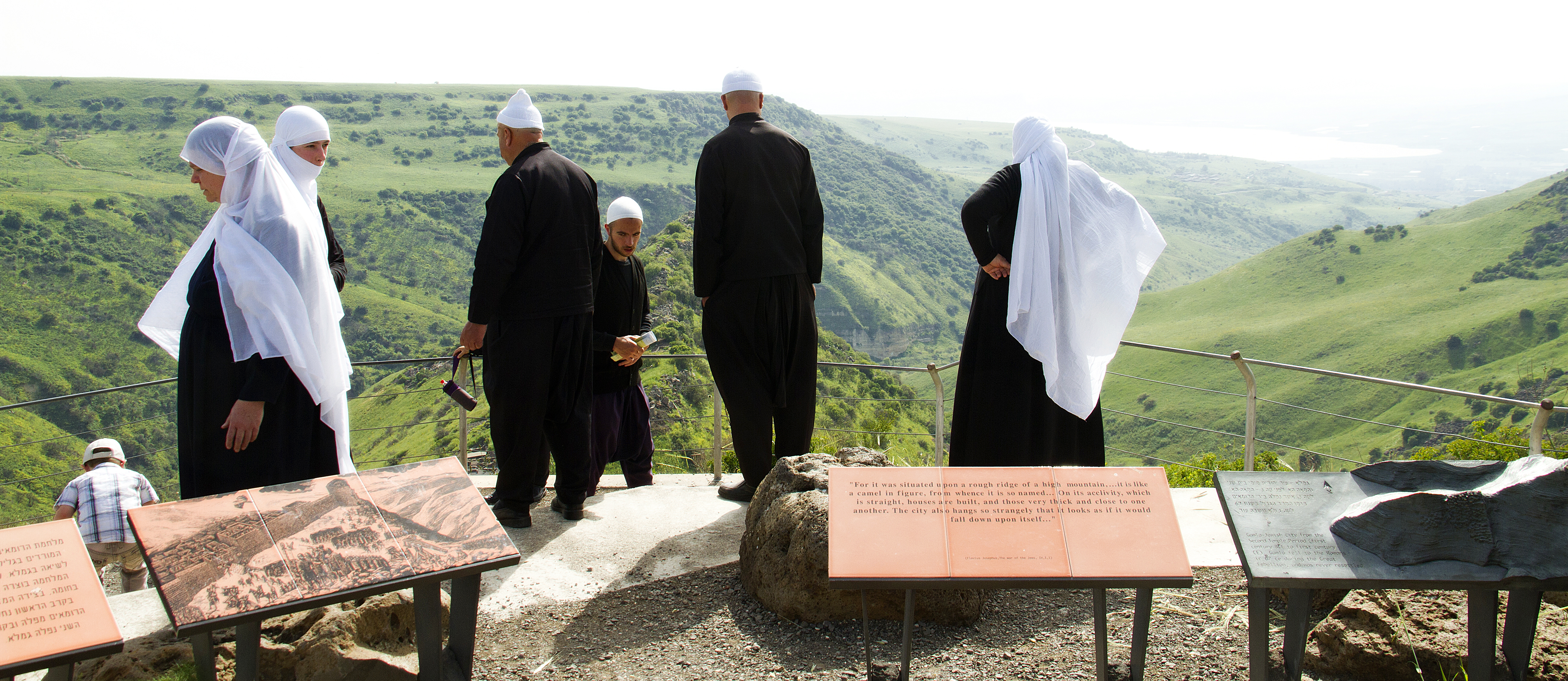
Israeli Druze visiting Gamla

In Israel there is a phrase "Gamla will not fall again," meaning that control of the Golan Heights is strategically important for Israel's security. Benjamin Netanyahu, leader of the Likud party and the Israeli Prime Minister, said in 2009 that the Golan cannot return to Syria for this reason.

== Gallery ==
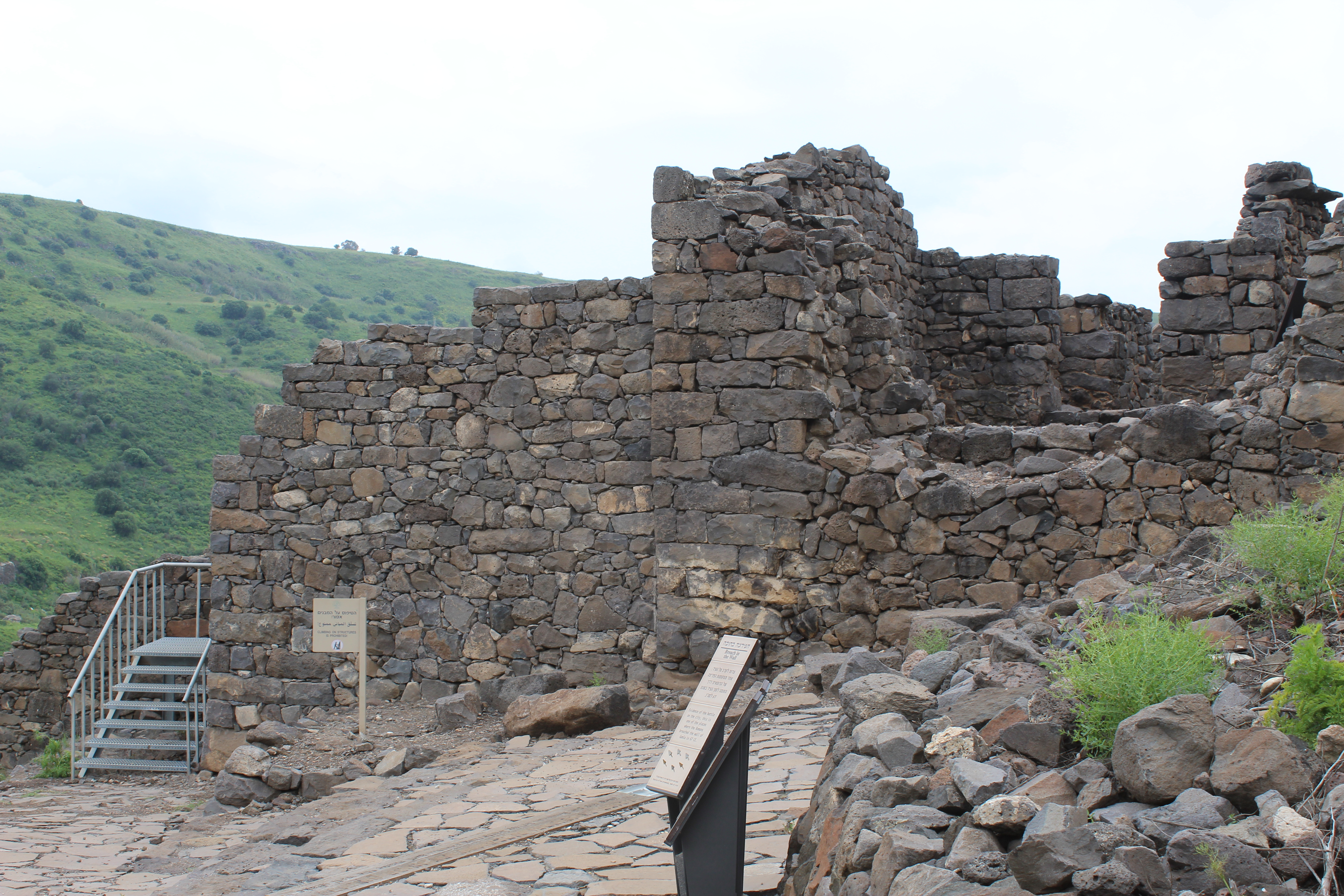
The breach in the wall of Gamla

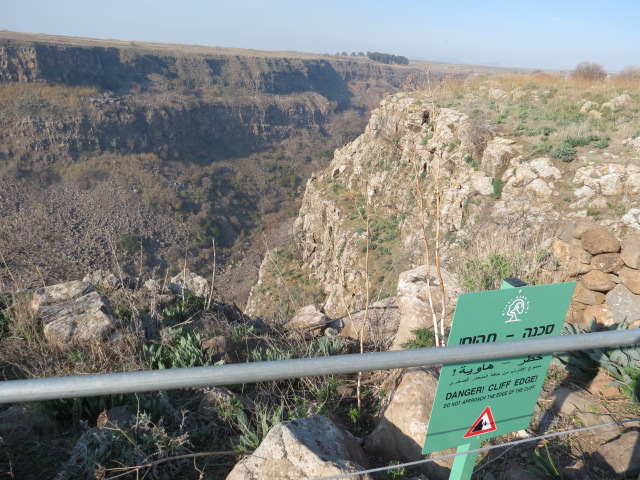
The Gamla vulture look-out

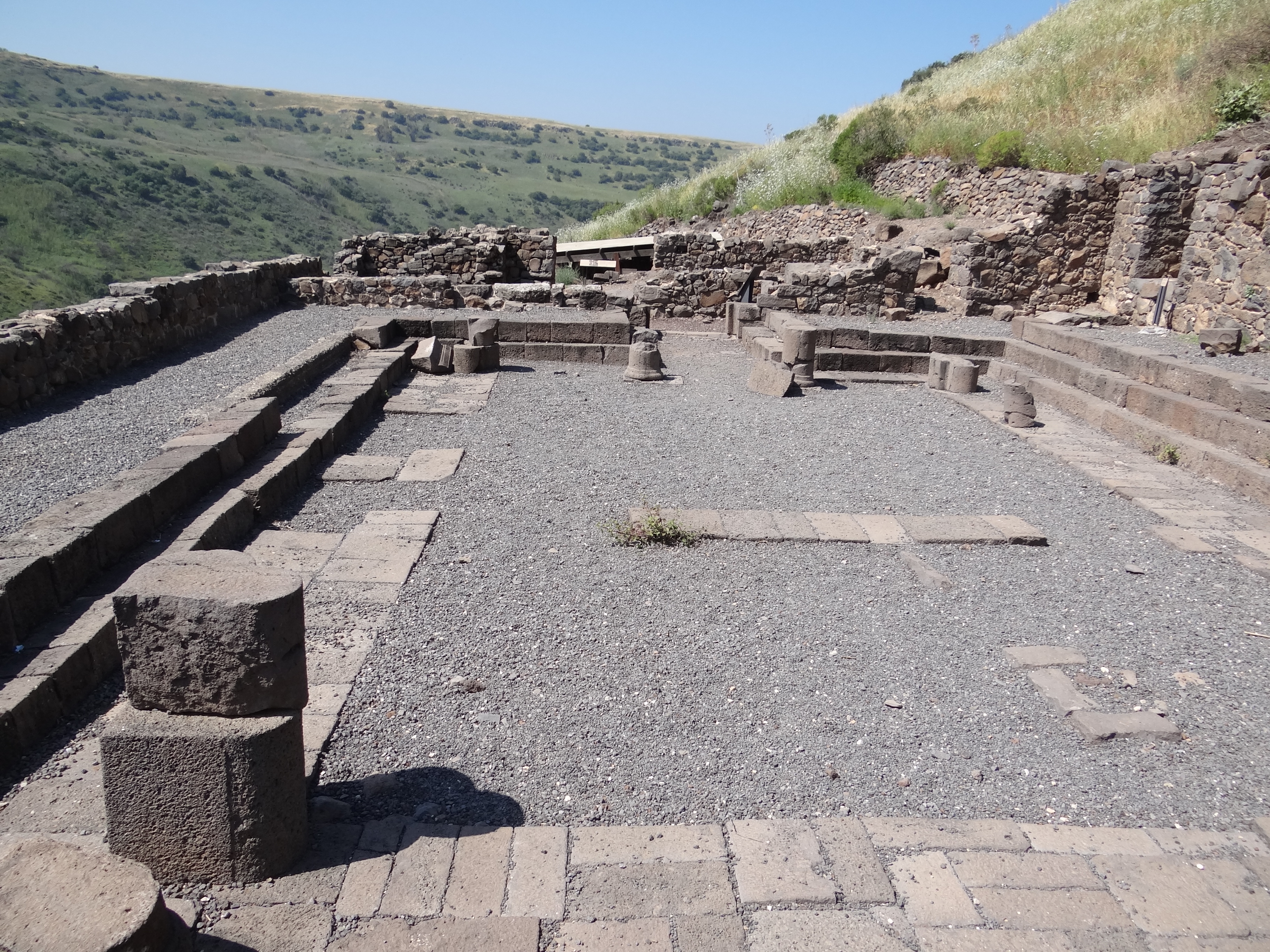
Ancient Gamla synagogue

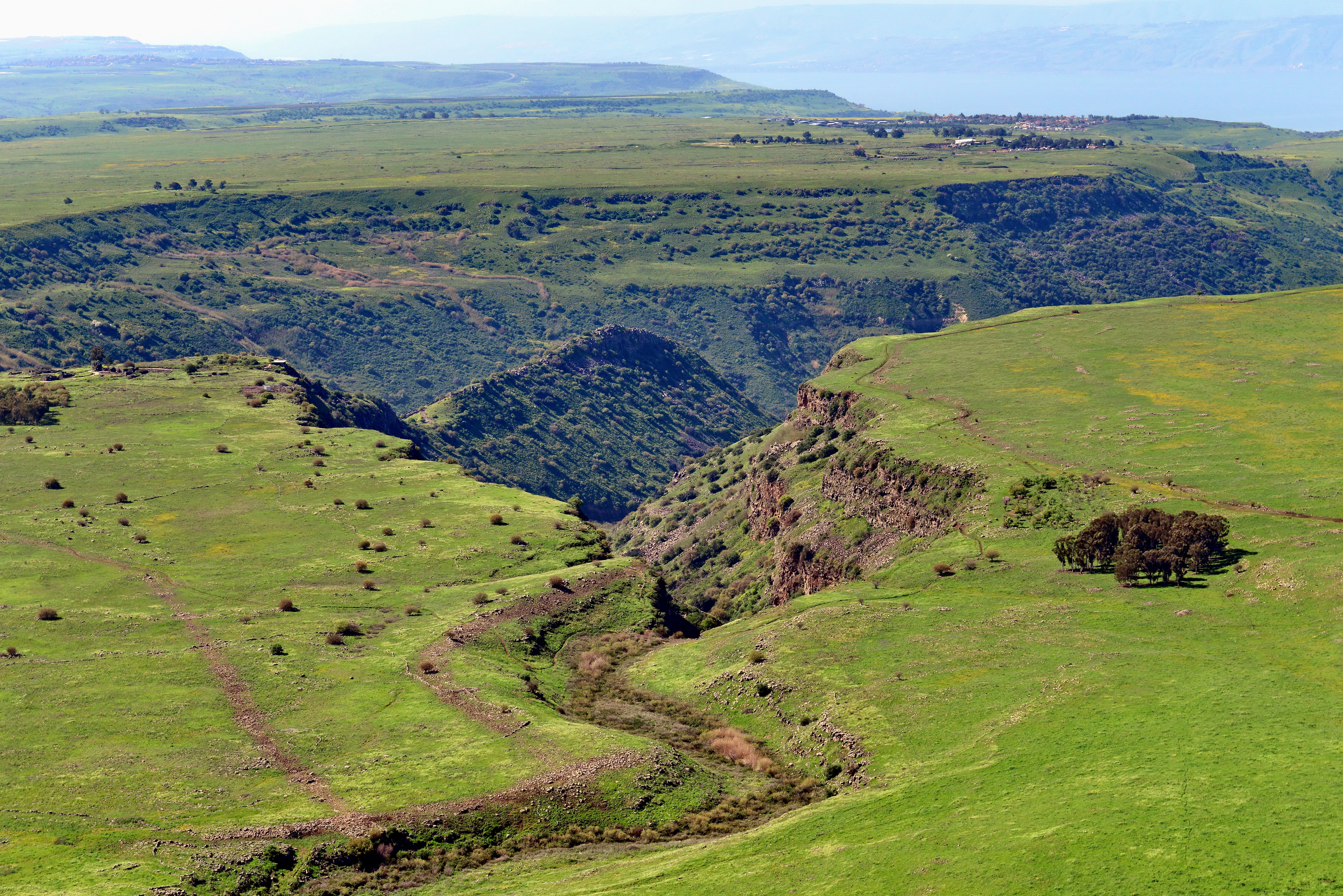
Gamla in springtime

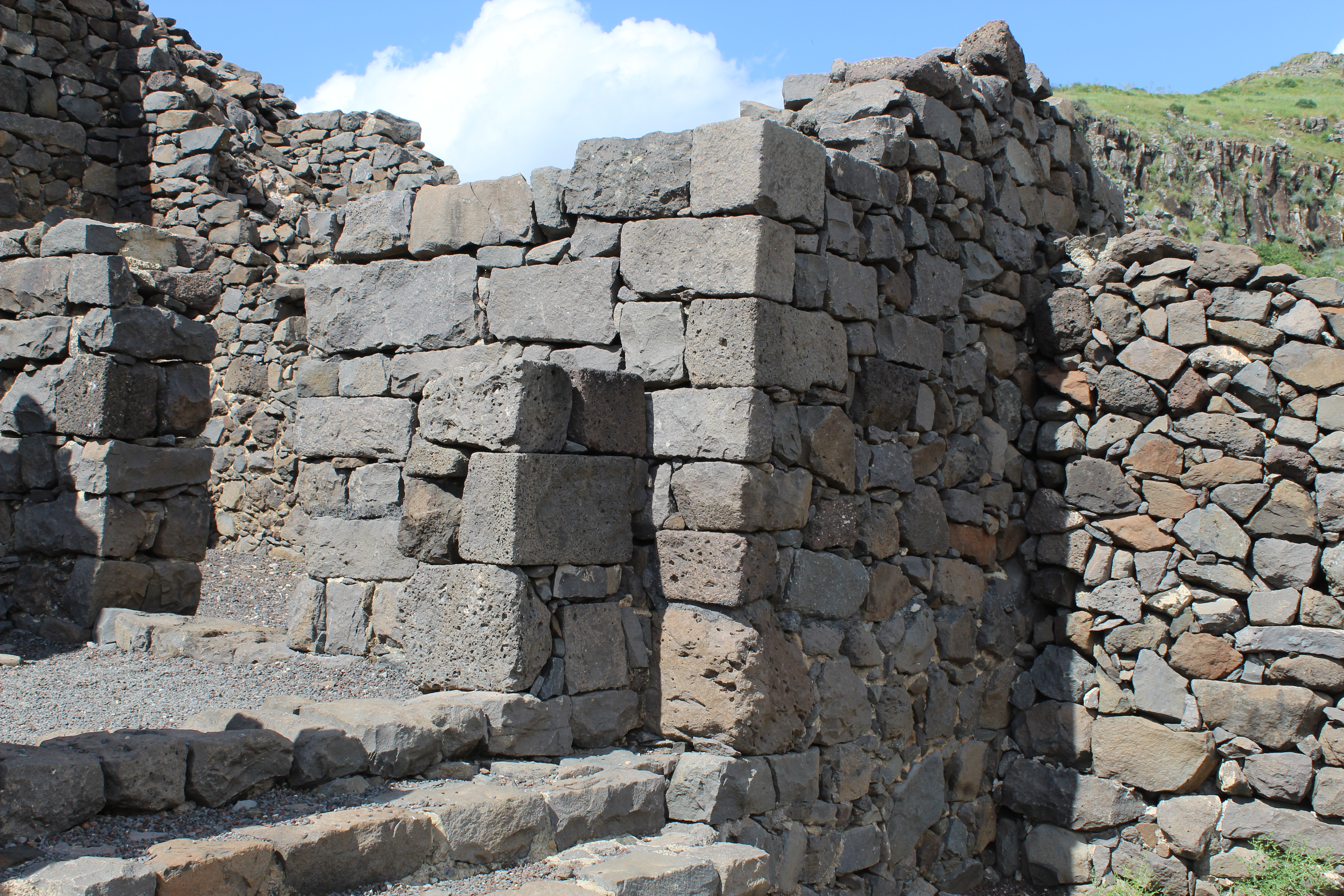
House made of basalt stones in Gamla

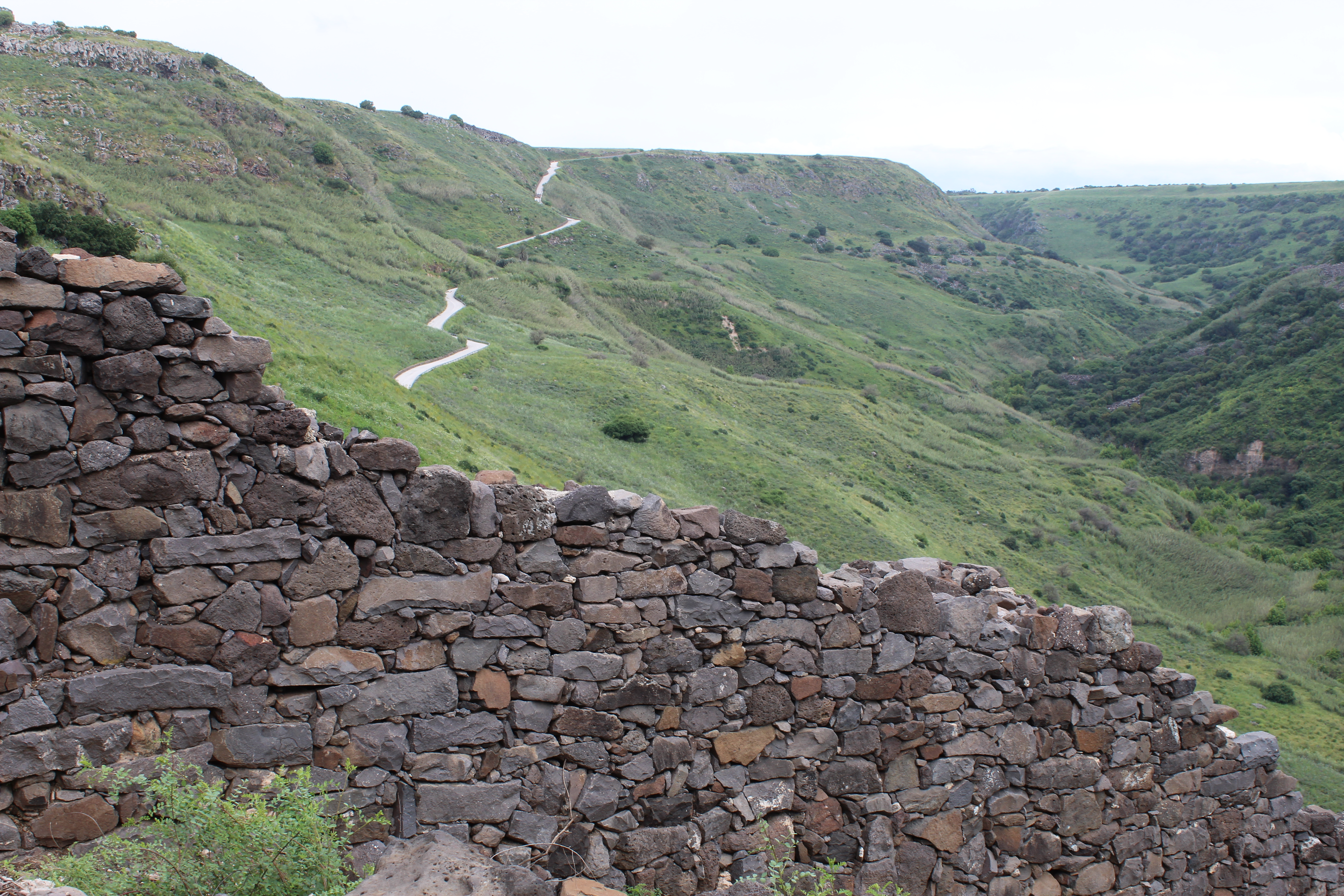
Defensive wall in Gamla

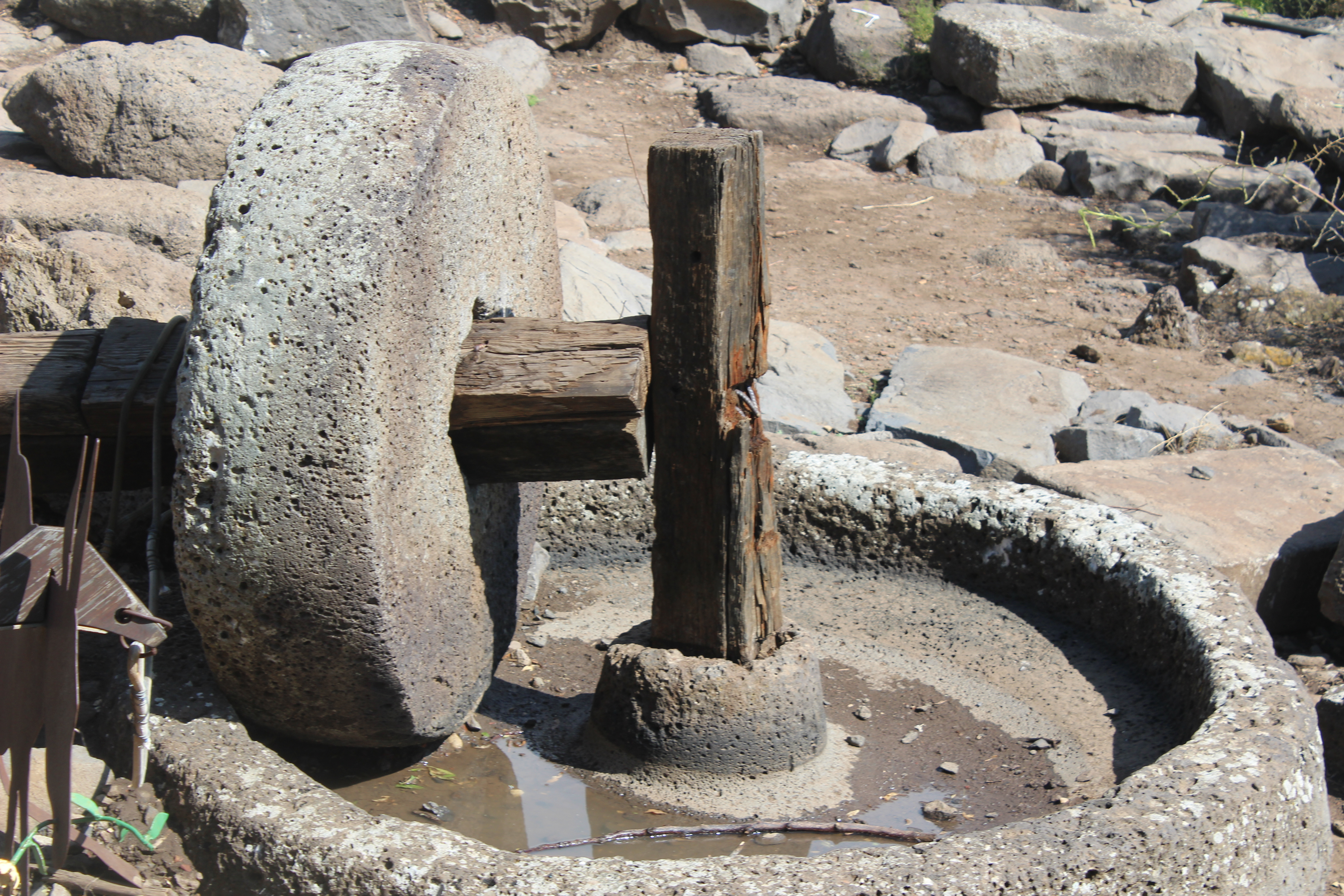
Olive-oil press from Byzantine era at Gamla

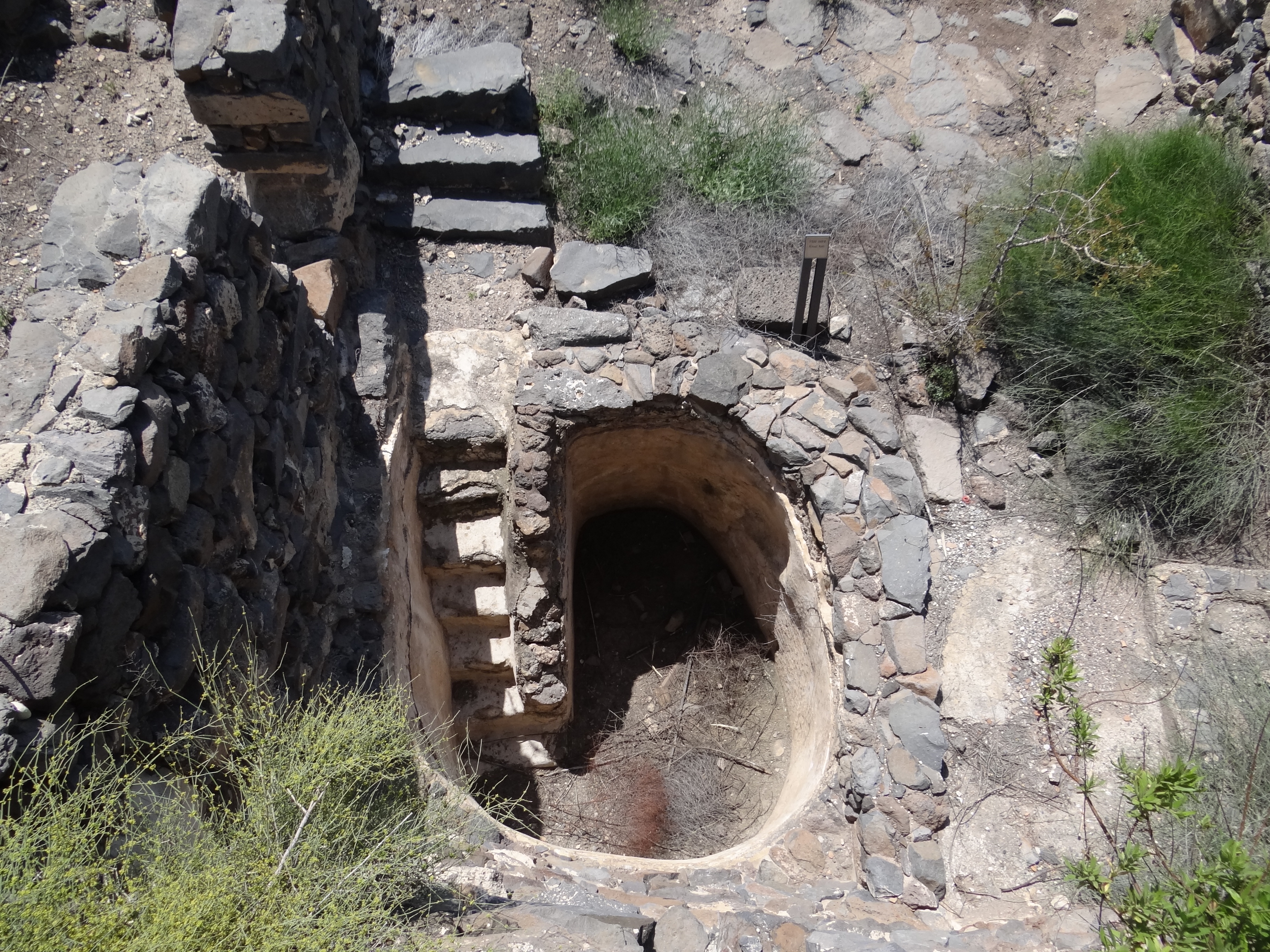
Mikveh remnant in the Hasmonean quarter of Gamla
