= Shmarya Guttman =

Israeli archaeologist (1909–1996)

- שמריה גוטמן
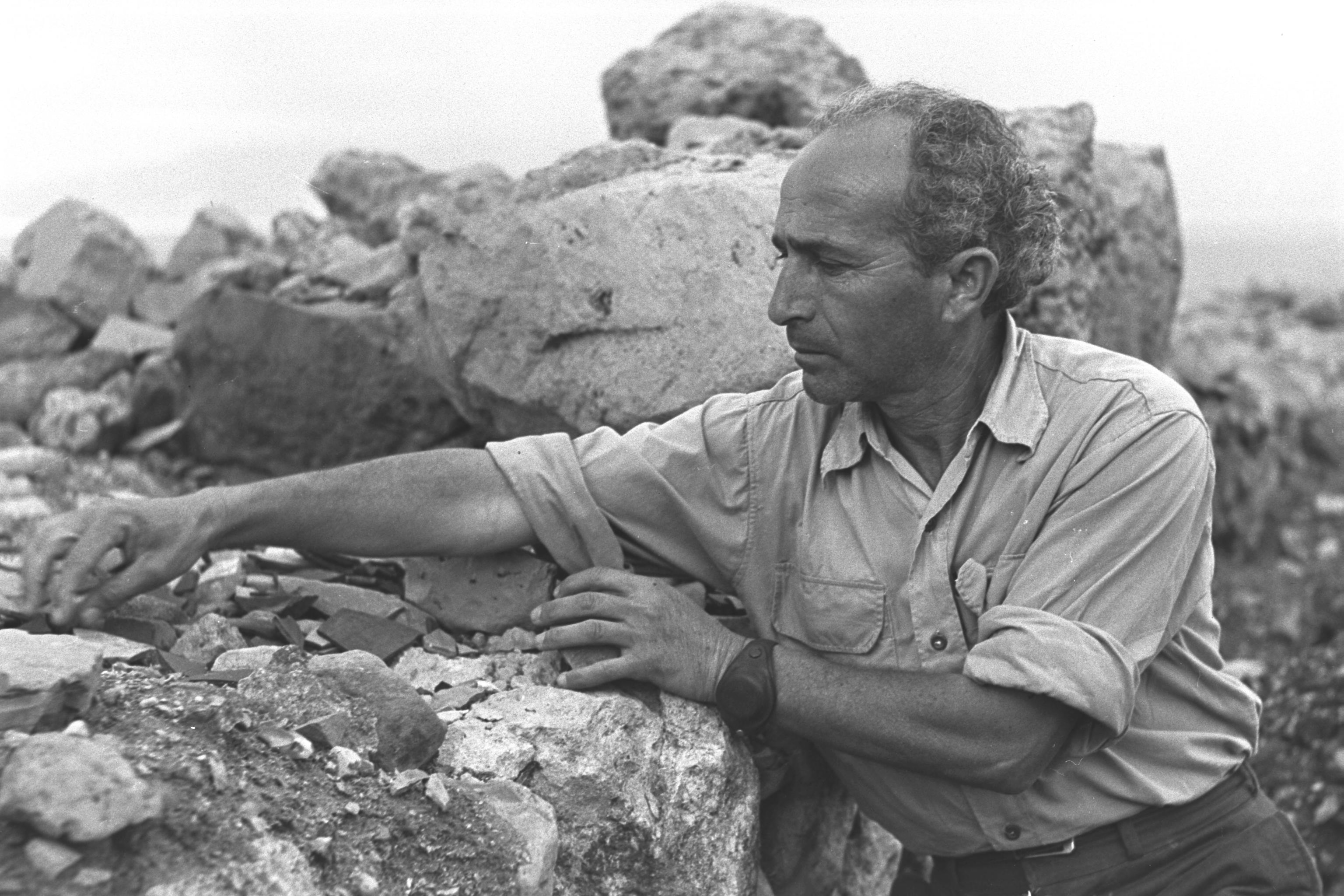
- Born: January 15, 1909; Glasgow, Scotland, United Kingdom
- Died: October 22, 1996 (aged 87)
- Occupation: Archaeologist

Shmarya Guttman (Hebrew: שמריה גוטמן; 1909–1996) was an Israeli archaeologist.

== Early years ==
Shmarya Guttman was born in Glasgow, Scotland. His parents were Russian immigrants. The family immigrated to Palestine when he was three. At the age of 17, he moved to Kibbutz Na'an, where he worked as a farmer.

== Career ==
In the 1930s, he served as an emissary to Jewish communities in Eastern Europe. Before the establishment of the State of Israel in 1948, he headed an intelligence unit of the Haganah. Later he was involved in diplomatic negotiations and took part in operations to bring Iraqi Jews to Israel.

== Archaeology career ==
In the 1960s and 1970s, Guttman was on the team that excavated Masada, which he had climbed with two friends in 1932.

Guttman initiated and directed the excavations at Gamla.
