= Beit Saber =

Beit Saber بيت سابر Beit Sabir
- Village
- Location within Syria
- Coordinates: 33°19′38″N 36°0′0″E
- Country: Syria
- Governorate: Rif Dimashq Governorate
- District: Qatana District
- Nahiya: Sa'sa'

Population (2004)
  - Total: 3,021
- Time zone: UTC+3 (EET)
  - Summer (DST): UTC+2 (EEST)

Beit Saber (Arabic: بيت سابر; also spelled Beit Sabir) is a village in southern Syria, administratively part of the Qatana District of the Rif Dimashq Governorate, located just southwest of Damascus. Nearby localities include Khan al-Shih to the northeast, Kafr Hawr and Beitima to the north, Beit Jinn to the west, Harfa to the southwest and Sa'sa' to the south. According to the Syria Central Bureau of Statistics, Beit Saber had a population of 3,021 at the 2004 census. Its inhabitants are predominantly Sunni Muslims.

Beit Saber is located on the banks of one of the lower tributaries of the Awaj River which originates from Mount Hermon. The name of the tributary is Sabirany, which derives from the name of the village "Saber."

== History ==
Medieval Muslim historian Abu'l Fida mentioned Beit Saber in the late 14th century, during Mamluk rule in Syria.

In 1838, Eli Smith noted that Beit Saber's population was Sunni Muslim.

During the 1973 Arab-Israeli War, Beit Saber was shelled by Israeli artillery, resulting in the destruction of two houses. The attack prompted an inquiry by the United Nations.

== Bibliography ==
- Le Strange, G. (1890). Palestine Under the Moslems: A Description of Syria and the Holy Land from A.D. 650 to 1500. Committee of the Palestine Exploration Fund.
- Porter, J.L. (1858). A Handbook for Travellers in Syria and Palestine. Vol. 1. Murray.
- Robinson, E.; Smith, E. (1841). Biblical Researches in Palestine, Mount Sinai and Arabia Petraea: A Journal of Travels in the year 1838. Vol. 3. Boston: Crocker & Brewster.
