= Mazraat Beit Jinn =

Mazraat Beit Jinn مزرعة بيت جن Mazraat Beit Jenn
- Village
- Location in Syria
- Coordinates: 33°20′N 35°55′E
- Country: Syria
- Governorate: Rif Dimashq Governorate
- District: Qatana District
- Nahiyah: Beit Jen

Population (2004 census)
  - Total: 5,073
- Time zone: UTC+2 (EET)
  - Summer (DST): UTC+3 (EEST)

Mazraat Beit Jinn (Arabic: مزرعة بيت جن), also known as Mazraat Beit Jenn or Mazraat Bayt Jinn, is a Syrian village in the Qatana District of the Rif Dimashq Governorate. According to the Syria Central Bureau of Statistics, Mazraat Beit Jen had a population of 5,073 at the 2004 census. Its inhabitants are predominantly Sunni Muslims. It was the site of a fierce battle in the Yom Kippur War.

Nearby localities include Beit Jinn to the west, Arnah to the northwest, Darbal to the north, Hinah to the north-northeast, Maghar al-Mir to the east, Harfa to the south, and Hader to the southwest.
