= Beit Jinn offensive =

Military operation

- Part of the Rif Dimashq Governorate campaign of the Syrian Civil War
- Situation in Beit Jinn as of 22 December Syrian Government control Free Syrian Army and Tahrir al-Sham control
Date	28 November 2017 – 2 January 2018 (1 month and 5 days)
Location	Syria: Beit Jinn/Mazraat Beit Jinn/Maghar al-Mir, Rif Dimashq Governorate
Result	Syrian government victory
Territorial changes	Syrian military captures Tal Bardiyah, rebel forces surrender Beit Jinn and leave to Idlib.; Syrian Army forces regain control of Beit Jinn and the whole Western Ghouta area.

Belligerents
(Syria) Syrian Government; Allied militias: Hezbollah al-Imam al-Hussein Brigade (Iraqi Shia militia)	Itihad Quwat Jabal al-Sheikh (Union of Mount Hermon Forces) (surrendered); (Syrian opposition) Free Syrian Army (surrendered); Ahrar al-Sham (surrendered); Ajnad al-Sham Islamic Union (surrendered); Hay'at Tahrir al-Sham (surrendered)

Commanders and leaders
Adnan Badur † (7th Division head of artillery); Hayder al-Juburi (Quwat Dir' al-Watan); Mohammed al-Hajj (National Shield); Basim Ahmad al-Khatib †; Abu Mahdi †	Ayman Sami al-Taani †; Abu Saad Al-Maldifi †

Units involved
Syrian Armed Forces; Syrian Army; 4th Armoured Division; 42nd Armoured Brigade; Embedded al-Imam al-Hussein Brigade forces, including the "Death Battalion"; 7th Mechanized Division; National Defence Forces and other local militias; Hermon Regiment; Quwat Dir' al-Watan; Druze militias; National Shield of the Patriotic Forces; Golan Regiment's Fist Battalion; Quneitra Hawks Brigade forces from Khan Arnabah	(Syrian opposition) Free Syrian Army; (Syrian opposition) Omar bin al-Khattab Brigade; (Syrian opposition) Khalid ibn al-Walid Brigade; (Syrian opposition) Al-Ezz Brigade

Casualties and losses
95-117 killed	Unknown

The Beit Jinn offensive was a military operation by the Syrian Arab Army against opposition groups in the Western Ghouta area, starting on 28 November 2017.

== Background ==
After successes of the Syrian Army in capturing Khan al-Shih and Wadi Barada valley pockets, and reconciliation agreements in Madaya and Zabadani, Beit Jinn remained the last holdout of opposition forces in Western Ghouta. The area is to the north of a de-escalation zone in southern Syria agreed in July between Russia and the United States.

== The offensive ==
=== Capture of Tal Bardiyah ===
On 28 November, government forces claimed to have captured the eastern side of the strategic Bardiyah mountain chain in the besieged Beit Jinn pocket, southwest of Damascus and near the Golan Heights, which is controlled by rebel fighters. Subsequently, there were competing claims between pro-government and pro-opposition sources on whether the rebels recaptured most of the positions they had lost or not. The mountain was fully captured by the Army two days later.

Helicopter strikes were halted in the area until the end of the offensive.

=== Battle for the hills ===
In the morning of 11 December, at 9:30 am, the Syrian army began operations in Western Ghouta to ensure fire control over Beit Jinn. Members of the 42nd Armoured Brigade of the 4th Armoured Division, the Syrian Arab Army, launched fierce artillery attacks on rebel positions. Heavy fighting began in Maghar Al-Mir, triggering attacks from several shots of shelling with IRAM missiles. During the fighting, the military captured two hills near Tal Bardiyah. The next day, the Syrian army begun the process of isolating rebel-held Maghar Al-Mir and managed to capture two more hilltops.

On 14 December, led by the 42nd Armoured Brigade, the Syrian Arab Army launched a major offensive against rebels on the tallest hilltop in the area, Tal Al-Bayda. They managed to successfully capture the area, after rebels pulled back to the west. The Syrian Army's next goal was to divide the rebel pocket in half.

The following day, the Syrian Army continued its main offensive, managing to impose total control over Tal al-Ahmar, after losing the hilltop two days earlier during a rebel counter-attack. By taking over positions around Tal al-Ahmara, the Syrian Army asserted fire-control over the roadway that connects the towns of Beit Saber and Maghar al-Mir. By 16 December, the pocket was nearly cut in half after more government advances through the hills.

As of 17 December, the Army was within 500 meters of Maghar al-Mir on its eastern side. Between 18 and 19 December, after capturing parts of a new hill, the rebel pocket was divided by artillery fire. By 21 December, Beit Jinn was completely isolated.

=== Rebel surrender ===
On 22 December, the Army captured a farm area south of Mazaraat Beit Jinn. Two days later, pro-government forces started the third phase of their offensive. SAA, Hezbollah and Iranian-backed Shia and Druze militias encircled Maghar Al-Mir and advanced towards Beit Jinn, assisted by heavy aerial strikes.

On 25 December, after pro-government forces captured more areas, negotiations started for the rebels to surrender. The next day, pro-government forces gave an ultimatum to the rebels – either surrender or face military defeat. The rebels were given 72 hours to surrender and either go to the rebel-held Idlib province or stay and reach a settlement. The evacuation began on 29 December, with rebels leaving for rebel-held Idlib province and rebel-held parts of Daraa province. The first buses arrived at their destination the next day with around 230 fighters and family members.

As the rebels retreated from the Beit Jinn area, the Army started taking over their former positions. Thus, on 2 January 2018, the military took control of the so-called 'Red Hills' following the rebel's withdrawal. The rebels used the hilltop chain to shell and conduct raids against a nearby government-held town. In early January, the Syrian army and its allies made advances in 3 villages of Beit Jinn. By the end of the day, the military took full control of the Beit Jinn area and their offensive concluded.

On 20 March 2018, it was reported that the last of the rebels left the Beit Jinn area the previous week, leaving the Syrian Arab Army in full control of the area, including the hilltops overlooking the town.
