= Kanaker, Syria =

Kanaker كناكر
- town
- Location within Syria
- Coordinates: 33°16′2″N 36°5′49″E
- Country: Syria
- Governorate: Rif Dimashq Governorate
- District: Qatana District
- Nahiyah: Sa'sa'

Population (2004 census)
  - Total: 13,950
- Time zone: UTC+2 (EET)
  - Summer (DST): UTC+3 (EEST)
- Area code: 11

Kanaker (Arabic: كناكر) is a town in southern Syria, administratively part of the Rif Dimashq Governorate, located southwest of Damascus. Nearby localities include Sa'sa' to the west, Beit Saber to the northwest, Khan al-Shih to the north, Zakiyah, al-Taybah, Khan Dannun and al-Kiswah to the northeast, Deir Ali and Jubb al-Safa to the east, Ghabaghib to the southeast, Kafr Nasej and Deir al-Adas to the south and Jabah to the southwest. According to the Syria Central Bureau of Statistics, Kanaker had a population of 13,950 at the 2004 census, making it the largest locality in the nahiyah ("subdistrict") of Sa'sa'. Kanaker marks the western boundary of the Marj al-Suffar plain, south of the right bank of the al-A'waj river. Its inhabitants are predominantly Sunni Muslims.

== History ==
In 1838, Eli Smith noted Kanaker's population as being Sunni Muslims.

Kanaker was settled by Druze from Mount Lebanon in 1862 and by 1867, the Abu Ras family, a prominent Druze clan and ally of the al-Atrash family, had gained control of the village. When the chief of the al-Atrash, Ismail Pasha, stayed a night at Kanaker, he massacred its Christian inhabitants before launching an attack on the Christian forces of the Shihab dynasty at Rashaya in Lebanon. Kanaker continued to be inhabited by Druze through 1883 and a certain time beyond.

During the Syrian civil war, on 27 July 2011, the Syrian human rights groups reported that eight or eleven people were killed during a Syrian Army raid in Kanaker and about 250 people were arrested. Four tanks and a bulldozer reportedly entered the village while another 14 tanks surrounded the place. The rebels surrendered the village in December 2016 and turned themselves in to the Syrian Army. In exchange, they had their status legalized.

== Kanakri family ==
Some Jordanians from 3 villages in the north of the country, Irbid province (Kharja, Saham and Al nu'aimah) have the surname Kanakri. This relates them to Kanaker. These families migrated from Kanaker-Syria down south to Jordan in the 19th century before the two countries had been issuing their independence and new borders. Of note, some of the families that migrated to present-day Jordan, are from Damascus proper.

== Bibliography ==
- Elisséeff, N. "Mard̲j̲al-Ṣuffar". Encyclopaedia of Islam. Vol. 6 (Second ed.). pp. 546–548.
- Firro, Kais (1992). A History of the Druzes. Vol. 1. BRILL. ISBN 9004094377.
- Robinson, E.; Smith, E. (1841). Biblical Researches in Palestine, Mount Sinai and Arabia Petraea: A Journal of Travels in the year 1838. Vol. 3. Boston: Crocker & Brewster.
