= Jdeidat Artouz =

Jdeidat Artouz جديدة عرطوز Jdeideh
- Town
- Location within Syria
- Coordinates: 33.43°N 36.16°E
- Country: Syria
- Governorate: Rif Dimashq
- District: Qatana
- Subdistrict: Qatana

Population (2004 census)
  - Total: 45,000
- Time zone: UTC+2 (EET)
  - Summer (DST): UTC+3 (EEST)

Jdeidat Artouz (Arabic: جديدة عرطوز, also spelled Jdeidet Artouz) is a town in southern Syria, administratively part of the Rif Dimashq Governorate, located southwest of Damascus. Nearby localities include Qatana to the west, Artouz to the south, Khan al-Shih to the southeast, and Darayya to the northeast. According to the Syria Central Bureau of Statistics, Jdeidat Artouz had a population of 45,000 in the 2004 census.

The presence of Druze around Mount Hermon is documented since the founding of the Druze religion in the beginning of the 11th century.

However, the town has a mixed population of Sunni Muslims, Greek Orthodox Christians, Greek Catholics, Druze and Alawites. Christians and Druze primarily live in the southern district of Jdeidat Artouz al-Balad, while Sunnis primarily live in the northern district of Jdeidat al-Fadel and also in Jdeidat Artouz al-Balad.

== History ==
In 1838, Eli Smith noted el-Judeideh as being located in the Wady el-'Ajam, and being populated by Sunni Muslims and Antiochian Greek Christians.

== Climate ==
In Jdeidat Artouz, there is a local steppe climate. Rainfall is higher in winter than in summer. The Köppen-Geiger climate classification is BSk. The average annual temperature in Jdeidat Artouz is 16.8 °C (62.2 °F). About 242 mm (9.53 in) of precipitation falls annually. The driest month is June, with 0 mm of rain. In January, the precipitation reaches its peak, with an average of 56 mm. August is the warmest month of the year. The temperature in August averages 26.0 °C. At 7.0 °C on average, January is the coldest month of the year.

Climate data for Jdeidat Artouz
Month	Jan	Feb	Mar	Apr	May	Jun	Jul	Aug	Sep	Oct	Nov	Dec	Year
Mean daily maximum °C (°F)	11.8 (53.2)	13.6 (56.5)	17.2 (63.0)	22.2 (72.0)	27.9 (82.2)	32.6 (90.7)	34.6 (94.3)	35 (95)	31.4 (88.5)	26.7 (80.1)	19.7 (67.5)	14.1 (57.4)	23.9 (75.0)
Mean daily minimum °C (°F)	2.3 (36.1)	3 (37)	5.2 (41.4)	8.4 (47.1)	12.1 (53.8)	15.3 (59.5)	16.8 (62.2)	17.1 (62.8)	14.6 (58.3)	11.6 (52.9)	7.3 (45.1)	4.1 (39.4)	9.8 (49.6)
Average precipitation mm (inches)	56 (2.2)	44 (1.7)	29 (1.1)	14 (0.6)	9 (0.4)	0 (0)	0 (0)	0 (0)	0 (0)	9 (0.4)	30 (1.2)	50 (2.0)	242 (9.5)
Source: Climate-Data.org, Climate data

== Religious buildings ==
There are eleven mosques and three churches distributed throughout the town:

Jdeidat al-Balad:

- Al-Omari Mosque (old town)
- Omar Mosque (Al-Jalaa Street)
- Abu Dharr Mosque (behind the municipality building)
- Al-Raja Mosque (Quneitra highway)
- Khadija Mosque (at the end of Corniche Street)
- Al-Rahman Mosque (at the beginning of Corniche Street)
- St. George of the Greek Orthodox Church (Old Town)
- St. George of the Melkite Greek Catholic Church (Church Street)
- Jesus The Light of the World National Evangelical Church (1st Residence)

Near the town and 3 km away is the St. Paul Vision Abbey at Tell Koukab, which was established in the place where Christians believe that Jesus appeared to St. Paul while heading to Damascus. The monastery was built in the 1950s on the ruins of the archeological monastery.

Jdeidat al-Fadel:

- Fadel ibn Abbas Mosque
- Al-Ahmad Mosque
- Al-Mustafa Mosque
- Salah ad-Din Mosque

Dahiyat Yusuf al-Azma:

- Al-Ghaleb Mosque

== See also ==
- Christianity in Syria
- Druze in Syria
- Alawites in Syria
