= Marj al-Saffar =

Syrian plain

Coordinates: 33°17′2″N 36°15′17″E

Marj al-Saffar or Marj al-Suffar (Arabic: مرج الصفر Marj aṣ-Ṣafar) is a large plain to the south of Damascus. Marj al-Saffar is bounded to the north by the right bank of the al-A'waj river, which flows from Mount Hermon to the Sabkhat al-Hijana. In the south the plain is bounded by the lava field of the Lajat (the largest, geologically recent lava-field in the south of Syria, roughly situated between Umm al-Qusur and Ghabaghib mountain). In the south-east, it is disputed whether it is the volcanic area of the al-Safa or the village of Jubb al-Safa that marks the boundary of the plain. Marj al-Saffar is bounded to the west by the village of Kanakir and in the north-west by the lava flow of Zakiyah. The railway line from Damascus to Daraa bounds Marj al-Saffar to the east.

== Military history ==
Because of its good water supply and excellent grazing, Marj al-Saffar was a staging area for armies and an area where many battles were fought. For the list of battles fought here, see Battle of Marj al-Saffar.

== Bibliography ==
- Elisséeff, N. (1991). "Mard̲j̲al-Ṣuffar". In Bosworth, C. E.; van Donzel, E. & Pellat, Ch. (eds.). The Encyclopaedia of Islam, Second Edition. Volume VI: Mahk–Mid. Leiden: E. J. Brill. pp. 546–548. ISBN 978-90-04-08112-3.
