= Artouz =

Town in Syria

Artouz عرطوز
- Town
- Location in Syria
- Coordinates: 33°25′17″N 36°8′39″E
- Country: Syria
- Governorate: Rif Dimashq Governorate
- District: Qatana District
- Nahiyah: Qatana

Population (2004 census)
  - Total: 16,199
- Time zone: UTC+3 (EET)
  - Summer (DST): UTC+2 (EEST)

Artouz (Arabic: عَرْطُوْز, romanized: ʻArṭūz, [ʕar'tˤuːz]; Syriac: ܥܰܪܛܽܘܙ; Hebrew: עַרטוּז) is a town situated 15 km (9.3 mi) to the southwest of Damascus, Syria. According to the Syria Central Bureau of Statistics, the town had a population of 16,199 in the 2004 census. Its inhabitants are predominantly Sunni Muslims.

== Etymology ==
The name of the town is of uncertain etymology.

The prevalent presumption traces the meaning of ʻArṭūz back to Syriac (ܥܰܪܛܽܘܙ), loosely translating into being aside or the one out of the way, which is a reference to the town's original, secluded location on a nearby mountain away from the usual routes back then. Furthermore, the two, Arabic quadriliteral roots of ʻ-r-ṭ-z and ʻ-r-ṭ-s both mean to evade, which supports the presumption that the town was named after its remote position.

A less popular translation assumes that ʻArṭūz means the scent of apple, and that the nearby mountain it was once situated on was called the mountain of apples.

== History ==
Evidence of the town's history is scarce. Throughout time, the region that cradles modern-day Artouz has been under the rule of a plethora of peoples, e.g., ancient Middle Eastern civilisations, the Neo-Assyrian Empire, the Byzantine Empire, the Umayyad Caliphate, the Abbasid Caliphate, the Mamluk Sultanate, the Ottoman Empire, and more.

There are historical references to a town in approximately the same location as Artouz during the Neo-Assyrian Empire.

A system of canals constructed at the time of the Roman reign is still in use to this day to irrigate the fields in the northwestern part of Artouz.

Artouz is believed to be the location of the New Testament event known as the Conversion of Saint Paul the Apostle. On his road to Damascus in pursuit of persecuting early Christians, Saul (later christened Paul) was interrupted by the ascended Jesus in the whereabouts of today's Artouz, a place called Tal Kokab (Levantine Arabic: تَل كوكَب, /'tal koː'kab/). The location where Jesus Christ appeared is now commemorated by an abbey named the Vision of Saint Paul the Apostle Patriarchal Monastery, which was visited by Pope John Paul II during his pilgrimage to Syria in May, 2001.

Originally, and during the Ottoman Empire's rule, Artouz was located on a nearby mountain 2000 metres to the northwest of its present place. However, the destructive Near East earthquakes of 1759 reduced the little town to ruins. The inhabitants who survived and chose not to migrate elsewhere became displaced, and later descended from the mountains and occupied the region that is known today as Artouz. The region was an ideal choice because the people depended on water for their agriculture, and the Awaj river ran there after the earthquakes had altered its course.

In 1838, Eli Smith noted Artuz as being located in the Wady el-'Ajam, and being populated by Sunni Muslims.

Artouz al-Kharaab (Levantine Arabic: عَرْطُوْز الخَرَاب, romanized: ʻArṭūz al-ḵarāb, /ʕar'tˤuːz elxa'raːb/) is a term used by the present inhabitants to refer to the remaining shambles of the old Artouz that used to exist on the nearby mountain. It means Artouz the Ruins, and the remnants still stand to this day.

Most of the farms were owned by few rich families from Damascus during the Ottoman and French periods, then the land was redistributed during the presidency of Gamal Abdel Nasser.

== Geography ==
Artouz is 15 km (9.3 mi) south west of Damascus, 6 km (3.7 mi) east of Qatana. It lies on the main road between Damascus and the Golan Heights. The Awaj river passes through the town and splits into three branches.

Artouze has a twin town only 2 km (1.2 mi) north called Jdeidat Artouz. Expansion of the two towns has erased the green spaces between them.

Artouz has great military importance, with many army detachments nearby.

== Economy ==
Until the 1980s, the economy of Artouz depended largely on agriculture. Olives, wheat and garlic were the main agricultural products. However, with the expansion of Damascus, Artouz developed a fast-growing construction and service economy, which is now the main source of employment for its population.

Artouz has no industrial region. Light industry located in and near the town is mainly limited to some dairy and poultry facilities.

Trade is a source of income of many people, with the town serving as a commerce centre for several surrounding small villages.

== Health care ==
There is only a small health centre, for day cases. The centre is not officially working as many of the public health centres in Syria. The nearest hospital is 3 km (1.9 mi) from the town centre: a private hospital in the nearby town of Jdeidat Artouz (Al kamal). Most patients go to Damascus for hospital care.

Artouz has a central water and sewage system. However, the water shortage is a serious problem affecting the whole region. There is no recycling centre.

== Transport ==
Artouz is well connected by roads to all neighbouring villages. A highway connecting Damascus to Al Quneitra (Golan) passes through the town.

There is also a train station servicing a rail line built by the French between Damascus and the city of Qatana. However, the train has stopped running decades ago.

Public transport is now limited to buses and mini buses, which serve to connect Artouz to Damascus. Residents also use the small mini cabs as taxis for short trips within the town.

== Demographics ==
The main historical ethnic group are Arabs, and the town is predominantly Sunni Muslims. However, the nearby town of Jdeidat Artouz hosts a mix of Sunni Muslims, Greek Orthodox, Melkite Greek Catholics, Druze and Alawites.

There have been no sectarian issues in Artouz, but since 1967 many refugees (mainly Bedouin) have come to live in Artouz, and the newcomers (called nazheen (نازحين)) have clashed with the long-term residents. Some of these clashes have resulted in casualties. Also, a few Iraqis have moved to Artouz following the American invasion of Iraq.

Artouz has several mosques. Churches of other faiths are located only in nearby Jdeidat Artouz.

Secularism flourished in the town in the 1970s, but the last two decades have witnessed growing religious fervour among the population.

== Education ==
Schools are mixed in the town, with boys and girls attending the same schools.

There are two secondary schools, one of which has been set up to serve the refugee community exclusively.

Artouz has good percentage of educated people in its population. English is the second language for most of the educated people, but the knowledge of it is also limited and not enough to communicate efficiently. French is also understood with limitation, especially between old educated Artouzians.

== Bibliography ==
- Robinson, E.; Smith, E. (1841). Biblical Researches in Palestine, Mount Sinai and Arabia Petraea: A Journal of Travels in the year 1838. Vol. 3. Boston: Crocker & Brewster.
