= Soufiane El Khalidy =

Moroccan actor, filmmaker and writer

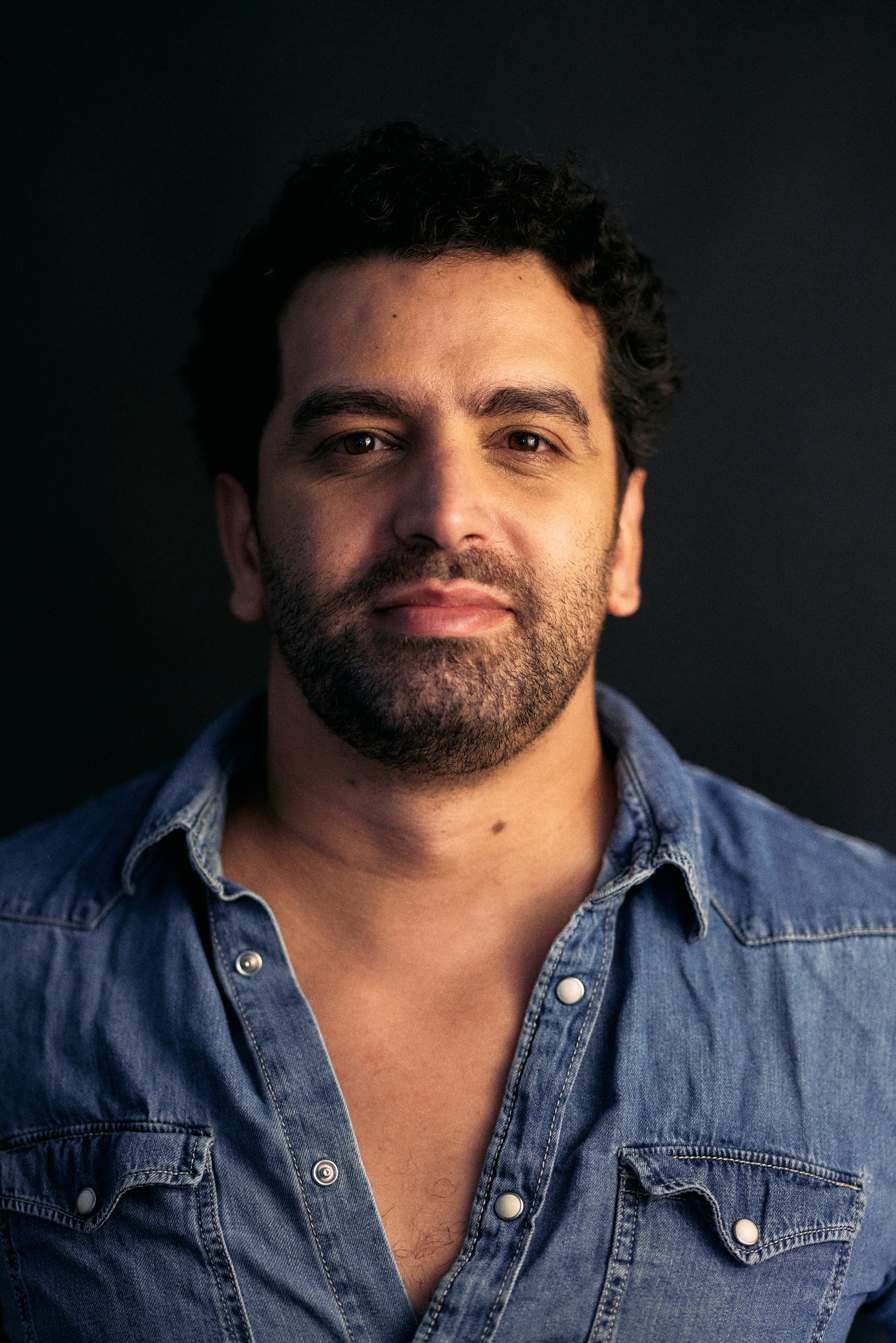
- Born: July 22, 1987 (age 39); Agadir, Morocco
- Education: Full Sail University (MFA)
- Occupations: Actor; writer; filmmaker
- Years active: 2014-present
- Notable work: Full list
- Spouse: Nadia Benzakour (m. 2022)
- Awards: Full list

Soufiane El Khalidy (born July 22, 1987) is a French-Moroccan actor, filmmaker, and writer. Born in Agadir, Morocco, he has acted in films and television series such as Ghosts of Beirut (2023), NCIS: Los Angeles (2017), Shockwave: Countdown to Disaster (2017), and the upcoming Netflix biopic Mary. He also played the role of Ridwan in the film Riley Parra (2017) and its sequel Riley Parra: Better Angels (2019).

Furthermore, Soufiane El Khalidy has starred alongside Lambert Wilson in the German film, Klandestin (2024) directed by Angelina Maccarone and the five times César Awards winner, Benoît Magimel in the upcoming big budget French diptych, De Gaulle, directed by Antonin Baudry. He starred as The Father in the commercial Heroic Girl (2017) directed by Aaron Weldon, the head of Layout at Blur Studios and the second unit director for David Fincher on the third season of Love, Death and Robots (2022). He played the character Youssef in the Shahid action series The Eight.

Soufiane El Khalidy is also a writer and filmmaker. He wrote the book Les Riffs d'un Moroccan Rebel (2022), and has received accolades for his short film Flags and Masks Down (2014) and his screenplays, Just Like You Imagined and Jukebox Zero.

== Early life and education ==
El Khalidy was born in Agadir, Morocco to the general practitioner and former lieutenant in the Royal Moroccan Army, Larbi El Khalidy and nurse Malika El Kaddouri. As a child, he was involved in amateur theatre at his primary school, Al Hanane. El Khalidy is a 2005 French College in Agadir graduate in mathematics, and later attended Bordeaux Segalen University in France, where he majored in medical education.In 2008, he abruptly stopped his medical studies, as he decided to come back to Morocco, where he studied business and later earned his bachelor degree in Marketing from Al Akhawayn University. According to the newspaper Libération, El Khalidy was during his studies at Al Akhawayn, the reporter for the Moroccan web magazine Fashion Maroc and its partner Elite Model Look for three consecutive years.

Soon after his graduation, El Khalidy moved to the United States thanks to a "Global Achievement Scholarship" offered by Full Sail University in Winterpark,Florida, where he'd graduate with a Master of Fine Arts in film production.

== Acting career ==
In 2016, El Khalidy started his movie career in Los Angeles after a recommendation from his professor at Full Sail University, Bill W. Benton. In 2017, The Actors Studio in New York invited Soufiane El Khalidy for its preliminary auditions in order to become a lifetime member.

El Khalidy has been described by Medi 1 as "the new face of Moroccan cinema". Like Youssef Kerkour and Said Taghmaoui, El Khalidy is one of the few Moroccan actors who have succeeded in international film productions and Hollywood.

During his career, El Khalidy appeared in various music videos by rock bands like Train, One Ok Rock and BRMC. In 2024, he is the lead in the music video Tatooine/ Maintenance by the French rapper, JXSH.

He is slated to play the lead alongside Sveva Alviti in the Italian movie Le Chemin du Retour by Fabio Zito.

== Personal life ==
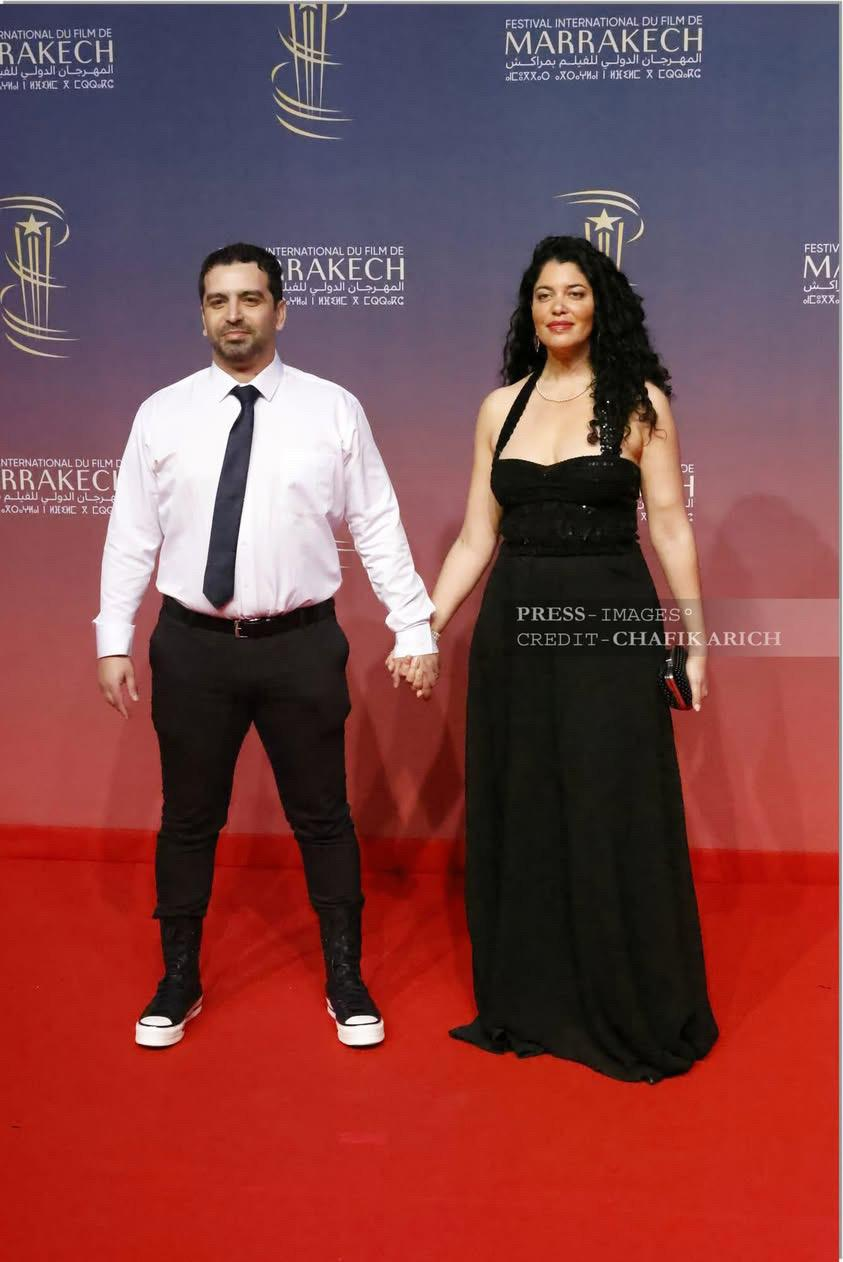
Soufiane El Khalidy and Nadia Benzakour at the 2024 Marrakech International Film Festival.

On 15 October 2022, El Khalidy married the Moroccan-French actress Nadia Benzakour ( Seneca: On The Creation of Earthquakes, Zodi & Tehu: Princes of The Desert, Killing Jesus, Deep State) in Tangier. The couple is often referred by the media as the Moroccan Brangelina.

Soufiane El Khalidy identifies himself as a liberal in a political and spiritual sense.

== Artistry ==
=== Selective filmography ===
==== As an actor ====
- 2017: NCIS: Los Angeles (TV series), as Sayid Lajani
- 2017: Shockwave: Countdown To Disaster (Film), as the Young Militant
- 2017: Riley Parra (TV series), as Ridwan
- 2017: Gulag Magadan(Movie), as Commissar Yagoda
- 2017: Heroic Girl (TV commercial), as The Father
- 2019: Riley Parra: Better Angels (Movie), as Ridwan
- 2022: The Eight(TV series), as Youssef
- 2022: Colosseum (TV series), as Centurion
- 2023: Ghosts of Beirut(TV series), as Kerem
- 2024: Klandestin (Movie), as the Coast Guard
- 2024: JXSH-Tatooine/Maintenance (Music video), as Alfred
- 2025: Mary (Movie), as Frustrated Pilgrim
- 2025: De Gaulle: Part 1 (Movie), as Koenig Soldier

==== As a director /writer ====
- 2014: Flags and Masks Down(Short Movie)
- 2015: Colonized Mind (Short Movie)

=== Bibliography ===
Soufiane El Khalidy has authored one book: Les Riffs d'un Moroccan Rebel (Editions Amalthée. ISBN 978-2310050425). Its preserved at the National Library of France in Paris and at the King Abdul Aziz Foundation for Human Sciences and Islamic Studies in Casablanca.

Les Riffs d'un Moroccan Rebel includes modern poems with both personal and political themes. His poetry depicts his childhood in Agadir, his life as a student in Al Akhawayn, in the United States, France and Spain, filming in Hollywood as an actor, racism in the film industry, his view of Moroccan and American societies as well as the rest of the world, as well as personal details.

== Awards and nominations ==
Year	Award	Category	Nominated work	Result
2015	Los Angeles Cinefest	Best Short Film	Flags and Masks Down	Nominated
2015	Mac Horror Film Festival	Best Student Film	Flags and Masks Down	Nominated
2015	Miami Independent Film Festival	Best Student Film	Flags and Masks Down	Nominated
2015	InterShort Online Film Awards	Best Short Narrative	Flags and Masks Down	Nominated
2015	All Seas Film Festival	Best First Time Filmmaker	Flags and Masks Down	Nominated
2015	Visionaria	International Competition - Short Film with Theme "Borders"	Flags and Masks Down	Nominated
2015	Black Bird Film Festival	Non- Competitive	Flags and Masks Down	Selected
2015	Broken Knuckle Film Festival	Slamin Short	Flags an Masks Down	Nominated
2015	The Monthly Film Festival	Best Trailer	Flags and Masks Down	Nominated
2015	Barcelona Planet Film Festival	Best Trailer/Teaser	Flags and Masks Down	Nominated
2015	Wiper Film Festival	All Categories are Welcomed	Flags and Masks Down	Nominated
2015	Westscape Film Festival	Best Comedy Short Film	Flags and Masks Down	Nominated
2015	Rock 'n' Roll Film Festival, Kenya	Rock 'n' roll themed short film or screenplay	Flags and Masks Down	Nominated
2016	Grand IndieWise Convention	Best Short Narrative Films	Flags and Masks Down	Finalist
2016	International Open Film Festival	Best Screenplay (Short Film)	JukeBox Zero	Semi-Finalist
2016	International Open Film Festival	Best Short Film	Flags and Masks Down	Semi-Finalist
2016	Eppfilms Indie Theater	Best Short Film	Flags and Masks Down	Nominated
2016	Golden Sun Short Film Festival	Best Short Film	Flags and Masks Down	Nominated
2016	Ozark Shorts	Best Short Film	Flags and Masks Down	Nominated
2016	Los Angeles Cinefest	Best Screenplay	JukeBox Zero	Nominated
2016	NewLife Film Festival & Screenplay Contest	Best Student Film	Flags and Masks Down	Nominated
2016	StarBest Film Festival	No competition New Film Makers	JukeBox Zero	Selected
2016	STEPS International Film Festival	Best Script	JukeBox Zero	Nominated
2017	Los Angeles Cinefest	Best Short Screenplay	Just Like You Imagined	Semi-Finalist
2017	Los Angeles Cinefest	Best Film/Video Poster	Flags and Masks Down	Semi-Finalist
2017	Cyprus International Film Festival "Golden Aphrodite Awards"	Photo/Still contest - Poster Contest	Flags and Masks Down	Nominated
2017	US Hollywood Int'l Golden Film Award	Best Screenplay	JukeBox Zero	Nominated
2018	Chicago Horror Film Festival	Best Screenplay	Juke Box Zero	Semi-Finalist
2024	WideScreen Film & Music Video Festival	Best Short Screenplay	Just Like You Imagined	Nominated
