= Al-Maqrousa =

Al-Maqrousa المقروصة
- Village
- Location in Syria
- Coordinates: 33°17′3″N 35°58′40″E
- Country: Syria
- Governorate: Rif Dimashq Governorate
- District: Qatana District
- Nahiyah: Beit Jen

Population (2004 census)
  - Total: 443
- Time zone: UTC+2 (EET)
  - Summer (DST): UTC+3 (EEST)

Al-Maqrousa (Arabic: المقروصة) is a Syrian village in the Qatana District of the Rif Dimashq Governorate. According to the Syria Central Bureau of Statistics, Al-Maqrousa had a population of 443 at the 2004 census. Its inhabitants are predominantly from the Druze community.

== See also ==
- Druze in Syria
