= Khan al-Shih =

Khan al-Shih خان الشيح
- Towns
- Location within Syria
- Coordinates: 33°21′30″N 36°6′26″E
- Country: Syria
- Governorate: Rif Dimashq
- District: Qatana
- Subdistrict: Qatana

Population (2004 census)
  - Total: 12,148
- Time zone: UTC+2 (EET)
  - Summer (DST): UTC+3 (EEST)

Khan al-Shih (Arabic: خان الشيح; also spelled Khan ash-Sheih, Khan Eshieh or Khan al-Shieh) is a town in southern Syria, administratively part of the Rif Dimashq Governorate, located southwest of Damascus. It also contains a refugee camp by the same name. Nearby localities include Kafr Hawr to the west, Kanaker to the south, Qatana and Artouz to the north, and Darayya to the northeast. According to the Syria Central Bureau of Statistics, Khan al-Shih had a population of 12,148 in the 2004 census. Its inhabitants are predominantly Sunni Muslims.

Khan al-Shih is named after a caravanserai (khan) that existed in the town during the Ottoman era. Al-Shih was the Arabic name for a wooded plant that grew in the desert. In the mid-19th century, the khan was described as having "high walls and a low door" by traveler Josias Leslie Porter. It served as a place of residence for a handful of families of local peasants and shepherds. The area surrounding Khan al-Shih, which was situated between a canal and the Awaj River (ancient Pharpar), was agriculturally rich.

Following the 1948 Arab-Israeli War, a camp for Palestinian refugees from the northern areas of Palestine was established in Khan al-Shih on an area consisting of 0.69 kilometers in 1949. It is known as Khan al-Shih camp.The inhabitants worked mostly as civil servants, teachers, farmers on Syrian-owned agricultural lands and manual laborers at workshops in the vicinity. Prior to the Syrian Civil War, much of the camp's population were middle class.

In October 2016 it was the scene of the Khan al-Shih offensive. On November 28, 2016, Jabhat Fatah al-Sham and their allies officially handed over the town to the Syrian Army, along with their heavy weapons, in exchange for their transfer to Idlib Governorate.
