= Konstantin Flemig =

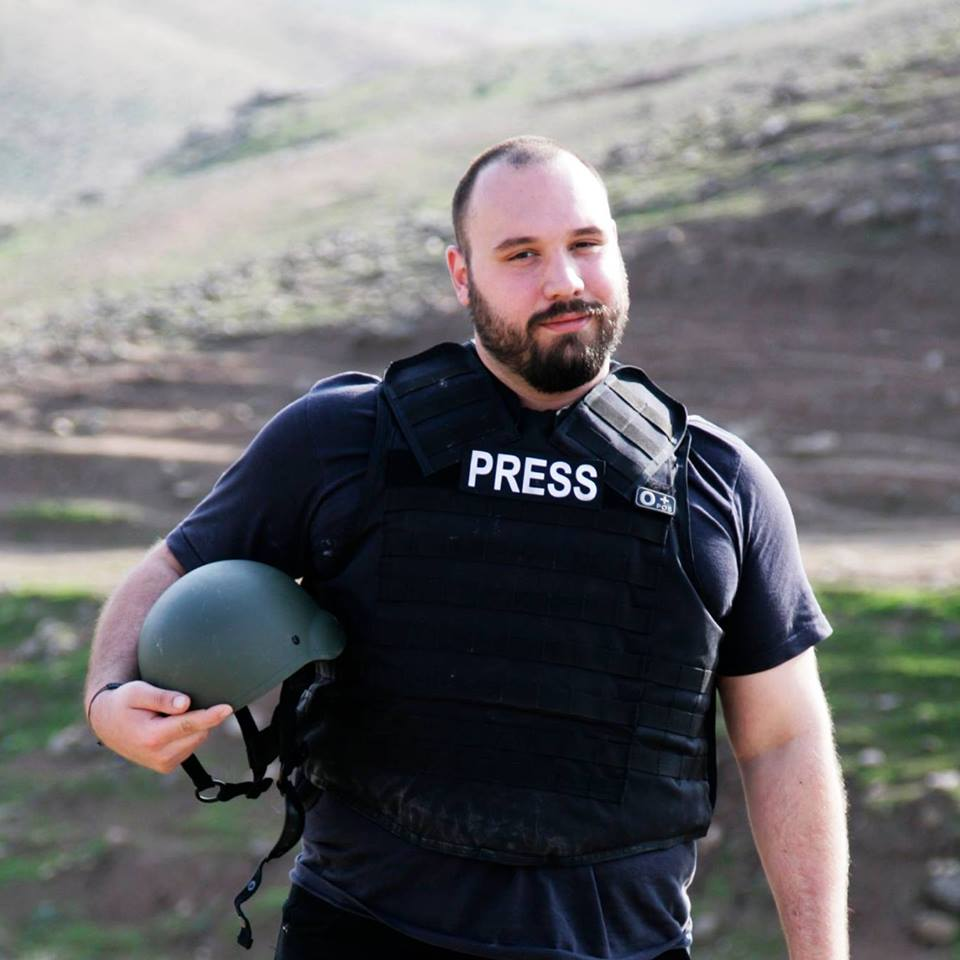
- Flemig in Northern Iraq
- Born: Konstantin Friedrich Flemig; 21 September 1988 (age 37); Stuttgart, Germany
- Citizenship: German
- Occupation: Film director
- Website: www.konstantinflemig.com

Konstantin Friedrich Flemig (born 1988) is a German director of documentary films.

== Biography ==
Flemig was born near Stuttgart, Germany. He started filmmaking as a teenager, creating stunt videos and mockumenatries in the style of MTV Jackass. For his application for film school, he travelled to Congo to make a film about a luxury restaurant.

He attended the German School of Journalism before studying documentary filmmaking and screenwriting at the renowned Film Academy Baden-Württemberg. For his film BilderKrieg - Picturing War he won the Hollywood International Independent Documentary Award as well as the Special Mention Award at the International Open Film Festival. The documentary about a young German war photographer was produced by German television SWR and was screened at multiple international film festivals.

For his short documentary Exit Exit Exit, he took a course offered by the German Army for war correspondents. He is one of Werner Herzog's rogues, a group of young filmmakers who attended his Rogue Film School seminar. The curriculum consists of topics like " the art of lockpicking", "the creation of your own shooting permits" and "Guerrilla tactics".

After publicly criticizing the Turkish invasion of Syrian Afrin in 2018, Flemig received several death threats.

Since the summer of 2022, Flemig has been on camera for the German YouTube channel CRISIS - Hinter der Front operated by Funk as a war reporter from the crisis areas of Ukraine, South Ossetia, Syria and Afghanistan, among others.

== Filmography ==
Documentaries

- Kinshasa à la carte (2010) (short film)
- Exit, Exit, Exit - War reporters in training (2012)
- Irtidad (2013)
- Picturing War (2016)

== Awards ==
- Hollywood International Independent Documentary Award for Picturing War
- Special Mention Award of the International Open Film Festival for Picturing War
- Jury Prize of the Baghdad International Film Festival for Picturing War
