= Khirbet al-Sawda =

Khirbet al-Sawda could refer to the following:

- Khirbet al-Sawda, Homs, a Syrian village in Homs Governorate
- Khirbet al-Sawda, Rif Dimashq, a Syrian village in the countryside of Damascus
