= Hamrit =

Hamrit حمريت
- Village
- Location in Syria
- Coordinates: 33°11′06″N 36°00′25″E
- Country: Syria
- Governorate: Rif Dimashq
- District: Qatana
- Subdistrict: Sa'sa'

Population (2004 census)
  - Total: 737
- Time zone: UTC+2 (EET)
  - Summer (DST): UTC+3 (EEST)

Hamrit (Arabic: حمريت; also transliterated Hamriyat) is a village in southern Syria, administratively part of the Qatana District of the Rif Dimashq Governorate. According to the Syria Central Bureau of Statistics (CBS), Hamrit had a population of 737 in the 2004 census. Hamrit's inhabitants traditionally belong to the Nu'aym tribe, which is spread across Syria but mainly concentrated around the Golan Heights and the Hauran. Its inhabitants are predominantly Sunni Muslims.
