= Maas, Syria =

Coordinates: 33°12′N 35°59′E

Maas ماعص
- Village
- Location in Syria
- Country: Syria
- Governorate: Rif Dimashq Governorate
- District: Qatana District
- Nahiyah: Sa'sa'

Population (2004 census)
  - Total: 719
- Time zone: UTC+2 (EET)
  - Summer (DST): UTC+3 (EEST)

Maas (Arabic: ماعص) is a Syrian village in the Qatana District of the Rif Dimashq Governorate. According to the Syria Central Bureau of Statistics, Maas had a population of 719 at the 2004 census. Its inhabitants are predominantly Sunni Muslims.
