= NCIS: Los Angeles season 8 =

NCIS: Los Angeles
- Season 8
- Season 8 U.S. DVD cover
- Starring: Chris O'Donnell; Daniela Ruah; Eric Christian Olsen; Barrett Foa; Renée Felice Smith; Miguel Ferrer; Linda Hunt; LL Cool J
- No. of episodes: 24

Release
- Original network: CBS
- Original release: September 25, 2016 – May 14, 2017

Season chronology
- ← Previous; Season 7 Next → Season 9

The eighth season of NCIS: Los Angeles, premiered on CBS on Sunday, September 25, 2016 with a two-episode premiere and concluded on May 14, 2017. The season contained 24 episodes. For the 2016-17 U.S. television season, the eighth season of NCIS: Los Angeles ranked #11 with an average of 12.51 million viewers and in the 18–49 demographic ranked 43rd with a 1.8/6 Rating/Share.

== Cast and characters ==
=== Main ===
- Chris O'Donnell as Grisha "G." Callen, NCIS Supervisory Special Agent (SSA) of the Office of Special Projects (OSP) in Los Angeles
- Daniela Ruah as Kensi Blye, NCIS Junior Special Agent
- Eric Christian Olsen as Marty Deeks, LAPD Detective and Liaison to NCIS
- Barrett Foa as Eric Beale, NCIS Technical Operator
- Renée Felice Smith as Nell Jones, NCIS Special Agent and Intelligence Analyst
- Miguel Ferrer as Owen Granger, NCIS Assistant Director (episodes 1–16)
- Linda Hunt as Henrietta Lange, NCIS Supervisory Special Agent and Operations Manager
- LL Cool J as Sam Hanna, NCIS Senior Agent, Second in Command

=== Recurring ===
- Vyto Ruginis as Arkady Kolcheck, Anna's father
- Peter Cambor as Nate Getz, NCIS Special Agent
- Erik Palladino as CIA Officer Vostanik Sabatino
- Aunjanue Ellis as Michelle Hanna, "Quinn", Sam's wife
- Jeronimo Spinx as NCIS Agent Thompson
- Elizabeth Bogush as Joelle Taylor, CIA Agent
- Bar Paly as Anastasia "Anna" Kolcheck, Arkady's daughter
- India de Beaufort as Alexandra Reynolds
- Jackson Hurst as Undersecretary of Defense Corbin Duggan
- Lisa Maley as Shu Chen
- Anslem Richardson as Tahir Khaled
- Kurt Yaeger as Sullivan / CIA Officer Ferris
- Adam Bartley as Carl Brown
- Tom Winter as Nassir, NCIS Special Agent
- Salvator Xuereb as Randall Sharov
- Sammy Sheik as Ahmed Han Asakeem
- John M. Jackson as Rear Admiral A. J. Chegwidden, JAGC, USN (Ret.)
- Pamela Reed as Roberta Deeks, Deeks' mother
- Karina Logue as LAPD Detective Ellen Whiting

=== Notable guest stars ===
- Alyssa Diaz as Jasmine Garcia
- Laura Harring as Julia Feldman
- Byron Mann as Zhang Kiu
- TJ Ramini as John Martin / Tobin Shaked
- Soufiane El Khalidy as Sayid Lajani
- Daniel J. Travanti as Nikita Aleksandr Reznikov / Garrison, Callen's father
- Eddie George as Byron Brown
- Marsha Thomason as Secret Service Special Agent Nicole DeChamps
- Martin Mull as Eddie O'Boyle
- Debra Jo Rupp as Ginger O'Boyle
- Azie Tesfai as King
- Bruce Thomas as LA District Attorney Frank Gibson
- Lester Speight as Max "Champ" Champion
- Scott Grimes as Digital Forensics Specialist Dave Flynn
- David Fumero as Air Marshal Miguel Salazar
- James Remar as Admiral Sterling Bridges
- Carl Lumbly as Charles Langston

== Episodes ==
No. overall	No. in season	Title	Directed by	Written by	Original release date	Prod. code	U.S. viewers (millions)
169	1	"High-Value Target"	Tawnia McKiernan	R. Scott Gemmill	September 25, 2016	802	10.34
170	2	"Belly of the Beast"	Terrence O'Hara	R. Scott Gemmill	September 25, 2016	801	10.34
Part I: Assaulting an intern, Elias Keating steals a blood irradiation machine for its cesium-137 choride. Meanwhile, Marty meets Moshe to buy a wedding ring. At LAX, Homeland Security Captain Kane finds radioactive saline amongst donations from The Foundation for Emigrant Relief, that were bound for Syria via Cyprus. Hunting the mole, Defense Undersecretary Corbin Duggan, with his assistant Chen, replaces OSP staff, while Nell furtively transfers data to a thumbdrive. Deeks poses as a Foundation volunteer to question Hope. Wondering how NEST sensors were defeated, allowing the cesium to be moved, Nell finds Antiqam Industries, which sells lead-lined products; Sam recognizes "antiqam" as Arabic for "vengeance." Raiding their warehouse, they capture Keating and unlock his phone, finding messages from Ahmed Han Asakeem, a former U.S. Naval Intelligence officer who defected to Jabhat Fatah al-Sham, making him "the high-value target in Syria." The OSP receives a dirty-bomb threat to release Keating, but it is only a ploy by wealthy Jihadi-wannabe Bassel Rizvi, who shoots Keating dead. At his estate, Rizvi's pool-side "honey" directs Callen and Hanna, who capture Rizvi. They convince Granger to leave for Amman and use the saline as bait to capture Asakeem. Part II: In Syria, wearing a burqa, Kensi takes out an insurgent gunman and grabs his cell phone, which leads the team to Beit Jinn, where they apprehend Asakeem. An ISIS fighter with a rocket launcher shoots down their helicopter, trapping Kensi underneath. Deeks, Callen and Hanna struggle to extricate Kensi, who falls unconscious after blood loss from a broken leg. Hetty packs her belongings and Granger rebuffs barfly Heather's advances, before joining Eric and Nell at the boathouse to find the missing team. Deeks, Callen and Hanna Jerry-rig a block and tackle to lift the helicopter, freeing Kensi, and improvise a gurney for her. Callen recaptures Asakeem who escaped, as ISIS fighters initiate a firefight. After retaking Ops, Eric launches drone missiles against ISIS using Duggan's credentials. An Osprey rescues the team to an aircraft carrier where Navy Doctor Smith treats Kensi, who has fallen into a coma. Nell, Eric and Granger leave Ops via secret tunnel, avoiding arrest by Duggan and Chen, as Hetty texts them "1D4D52C4" which Granger recognizes as "The Queen's Gambit... sacrificing a pawn to gain an advantage." Duggan arrests Hetty, who claims that she is the mole.
171	3	"The Queen's Gambit"	Dennis Smith	R. Scott Gemmill	October 2, 2016	803	11.39
In the aftermath of Hetty's arrest by Undersecretary Duggan, the NCIS OSP team find themselves tracking a former marine who kidnapped a rug store owner with potential ties to terrorism to uncovering a trafficking ring via casting agencies. With Kensi still in a coma, Granger enlists the services of Nell Jones to partner with Deeks. Meanwhile, Undersecretary Duggan continues his interrogation of Hetty with rather minimal results. After meeting with the Secretary of Defense, Hetty offers her resignation 90 days hence should the real mole remains at large, to the dismay of Duggan
172	4	"Black Market"	James Hanlon	Jordana Lewis Jaffee	October 16, 2016	804	10.89
After the mysterious death of an Immigration Service Agent, NCIS unravels a mystery surrounding the Triads and the arrival of their crime boss, whom they believed to be long dead. Meanwhile, Deeks' faith in Kensi recovering becomes testing as he continues to partner with Nell. Behind the scenes, Hetty prepares to hunt the illusive mole.
173	5	"Ghost Gun"	Benny Boom	Kyle Harimoto	October 23, 2016	805	11.40
NCIS is called to investigate the death of an air force private who's division includes top clearance and specializes in newly designed drone programs. While Deeks is away to the hospital, Hetty calls in Anna Kolchek to assist on the case. Meanwhile, Sam is sent to a black site to interrogate Carl Brown, a former employee of NCIS who admitted to being the original mole.
174	6	"Home Is Where the Heart Is"	Eric A. Pot	Joseph C. Wilson	October 30, 2016	806	9.74
While investigating a failed break-in, the team discovers that the man responsible for stopping the break-in is more than he seems - and that he is a former Mossad agent targeted by a rogue comrade. While Anna partners with Nell on the case, Deeks tries to help Kensi deal with the extensive therapy required for her recovery.
175	7	"Crazy Train"	Diana C. Valentine	Frank Military	November 6, 2016	807	10.26
After an NSA analyst is found eaten by a shark, the team's investigation leads them to a cartel's money-laundering scheme and sends Callen into a mental asylum to find a key witness; Kensi struggles with her therapy.
176	8	"Parallel Resistors"	Eric Laneuville	Joe Sachs	November 13, 2016	808	12.11
The team's investigation into the electrocution of a college student working on a classified Navy project leads them to his inquisitive daughter, who may be the key to accessing his work.
177	9	"Glasnost"	John Peter Kousakis	Andrew Bartels	November 20, 2016	809	10.43
After a woman is poisoned with polonium-210, the team's investigation into her past leads them to Callen's father - and his dark secrets.
178	10	"Sirens"	Jonathan Frakes	Erin Broadhurst	November 27, 2016	810	11.39
After two fake sheriff's deputies are killed outside of Callen's house, the investigation leads them deeper into the mole problem, and Nell interrogates Carl Brown for more information.
179	11	"Tidings We Bring"	James Hanlon	Chad Mazero	December 18, 2016	811	10.37
The team goes on the chase for a Navy analyst being held hostage, only to discover things aren't as simple as they seem.
180	12	"Kulinda"	Tawnia McKiernan	Kyle Harimoto	January 8, 2017	812	10.41
After a city councilman's bodyguard is killed, Sam goes undercover inside the bodyguard's employer to figure out what got him killed.
181	13	"Hot Water"	Dennis Smith	Anastasia Kousakis	January 15, 2017	813	8.58
On the day Undersecretary Duggan comes for Hetty's resignation, the team finds itself short-handed as Granger, Deeks, Sam, and Callen are arrested for planted evidence. While in custody, Granger is stabbed by an unknown assailant.
182	14	"Under Siege"	Ruba Nadda	R. Scott Gemmill	January 29, 2017	814	11.29
While Hetty goes rogue on her own agenda to identify the mole, the team must regroup, but things go awry when Kensi is kidnapped by a man she thought she could trust.
183	15	"Payback"	Terrence O'Hara	Jordana Lewis Jaffe	February 19, 2017	815	8.61
As the team races to save Kensi from Ferris/Sullivan, they find themselves questioning who they can trust when old faces resurface. Cast: This is the final appearance of Owen Granger due to Miguel Ferrer's death.
184	16	"Old Tricks"	Terence Nightingall	Andrew Bartels	March 5, 2017	816	9.46
When a Navy lieutenant and his grandfather are kidnapped from a retirement home, the team's investigation leads them to a con artist couple and the hunt for a rare coin; Callen meanwhile has to deal with his father's actions when he kidnaps the father of his grandson (and Callen's nephew). Cast: Owen Granger is written out of the show in this episode due to the death of Miguel Ferrer. Granger is said to have left the hospital and the team to "tend to some old business" and an in memoriam slide for Ferrer is displayed before the closing credits.
185	17	"Queen Pin"	Eric Laneuville	Joseph C. Wilson	March 12, 2017	817	9.26
Sam resumes an old alias to bring down a major criminal kingpin; Callen and Anna's romantic night is interrupted when they are tasked with escorting a high-value prisoner to Los Angeles for questioning.
186	18	"Getaway"	Tony Wharmby	Erin Broadhurst	March 19, 2017	818	9.10
After the U.S. Treasury Department is hacked, Nell and Eric go undercover inside a couple's retreat to track a tech-savvy husband and wife linked to the crime. Also, Digital Forensics Specialist Dave Flynn arrives from the NCIS cyber office in San Diego to run ops while Eric and Nell are on assignment.
187	19	"767"	Benny Boom	Kyle Harimoto	March 26, 2017	819	11.17
After a design engineer for a new Navy stealth vessel is killed, Callen and Sam board a flight to Tokyo to follow his colleague, who may have the stolen plans on him.
188	20	"From Havana with Love"	Dennis Smith	Joe Sachs	April 9, 2017	820	9.51
The team investigates when a man claims his wife, a Navy contractor is selling state secrets, leading them to a Cuban club where Kensi and Deeks go undercover.
189	21	"Battle Scars"	James Whitmore Jr.	Jordana Lewis Jaffe & Andrew Bartels	April 23, 2017	821	9.44
When a veteran kidnaps a corrupt VA administrator, the team must work with old friends of Hetty's, one of which being A.J. Chegwidden to find him and figure out what's going on.
190	22	"Golden Days"	Ruba Nadda	Joseph C. Wilson & Lee A. Carlisle	April 30, 2017	822	9.08
The team works with Hetty's former Vietnam War colleagues to recover $40 million in stolen gold, though things get complicated when other parties invest themselves into the search. Deeks receives some surprising news from Detective Whiting about his IA case.
191	23	"Uncaged"	Frank Military	Frank Military	May 7, 2017	824	9.06
The team races to rescue Michelle when she is kidnapped, with the kidnappers demanding the release of Sam's nemesis Tahir Khaled.
192	24	"Unleashed"	John Peter Kousakis	R. Scott Gemmill	May 14, 2017	823	9.40
After Michelle's death, Sam goes off on his own to avenge her death and end Tahir Khaled once and for all.

== Ratings ==
No.	Episode	Air date	18-49 rating	Viewers (millions)
1	"High-Value Target"	September 25, 2016	1.5/5	10.34
2	"Belly of the Beast"	September 25, 2016	1.5/5	10.34
3	"The Queen's Gambit"	October 2, 2016	1.5/5	11.39
4	"Black Market"	October 16, 2016	1.4/5	10.89
5	"Ghost Gun"	October 23, 2016	1.7/5	11.40
6	"Home Is Where the Heart Is"	October 30, 2016	1.2/4	9.74
7	"Crazy Train"	November 6, 2016	1.4/5	10.26
8	"Parallel Resistors"	November 13, 2016	1.6/5	12.11
9	"Glasnost"	November 20, 2016	1.5/4	10.43
10	"Sirens"	November 27, 2016	1.5/5	11.39
11	"Tidings We Bring"	December 18, 2016	1.4/5	10.37
12	"Kulinda"	January 8, 2017	1.3/4	10.41
13	"Hot Water"	January 15, 2017	1.0/3	8.58
14	"Under Siege"	January 29, 2017	1.4/5	11.29
15	"Payback"	February 19, 2017	1.1/4	8.61
16	"Old Tricks"	March 5, 2017	1.3/4	9.46
17	"Queen Pin"	March 12, 2017	1.1/4	9.26
18	"Getaway"	March 19, 2017	1.1/4	9.10
19	"767"	March 26, 2017	1.6/6	11.17
20	"From Havana with Love"	April 9, 2017	1.1/4	9.51
21	"Battle Scars"	April 23, 2017	1.0/4	9.44
22	"Golden Days"	April 30, 2017	1.0/4	9.08
23	"Uncaged"	May 7, 2017	1.0/4	9.06
24	"Unleashed"	May 14, 2017	1.2/5	9.40

== Home video release ==
NCIS: Los Angeles: The Eighth Season
Set details	Special features	
Media Format: AC-3, Box set, Color, Dolby, Widescreen, NTSC		
DVD release dates
Region 1	Region 2	Region 4
August 22, 2017	September 18, 2017	August 30, 2017
