= Qalaat al-Jandal =

Qalaat al-Jandal قلعة الجندل
- Village
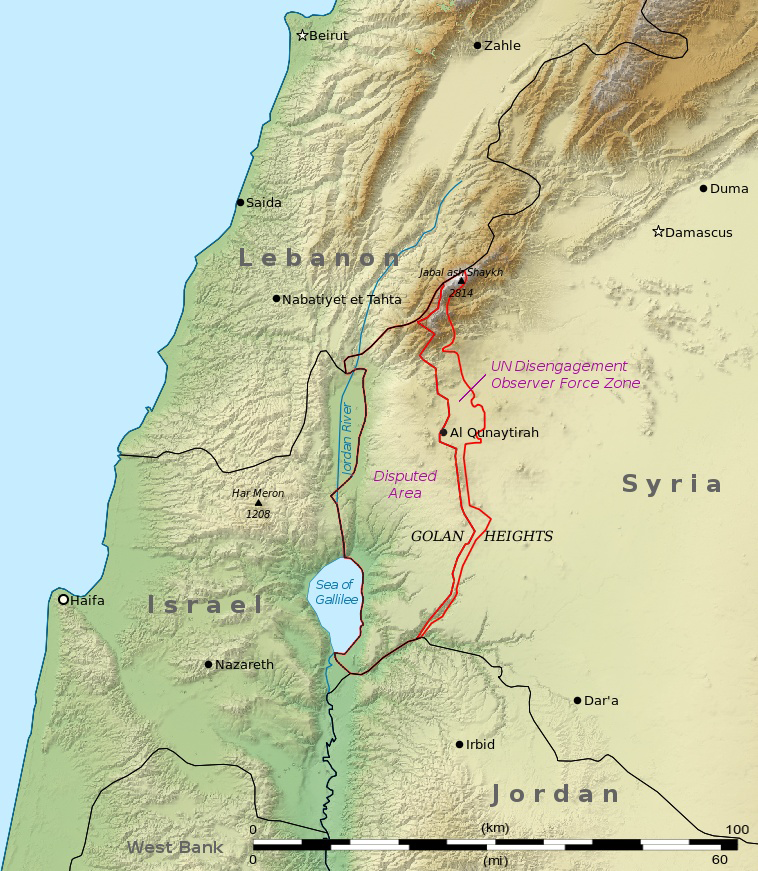
- Location in Syria Qalaat al-Jandal (Syria)
- Coordinates: 33°25′21.89″N 35°57′41.36″E
- Country: Syria
- Governorate: Rif Dimashq Governorate
- District: Qatana District
- Nahiyah: Qatana

Population (2004 census)
  - Total: 3,251
- Time zone: UTC+2 (EET)
  - Summer (DST): UTC+3 (EEST)

Qalaat al-Jandal (Arabic: قلعة الجندل) is a Syrian village in the Qatana District of the Rif Dimashq Governorate. According to the Syria Central Bureau of Statistics (CBS), Qalaat al-Jandal had a population of 3,251 in the 2004 census. Its inhabitants are predominantly Druze.

== History ==
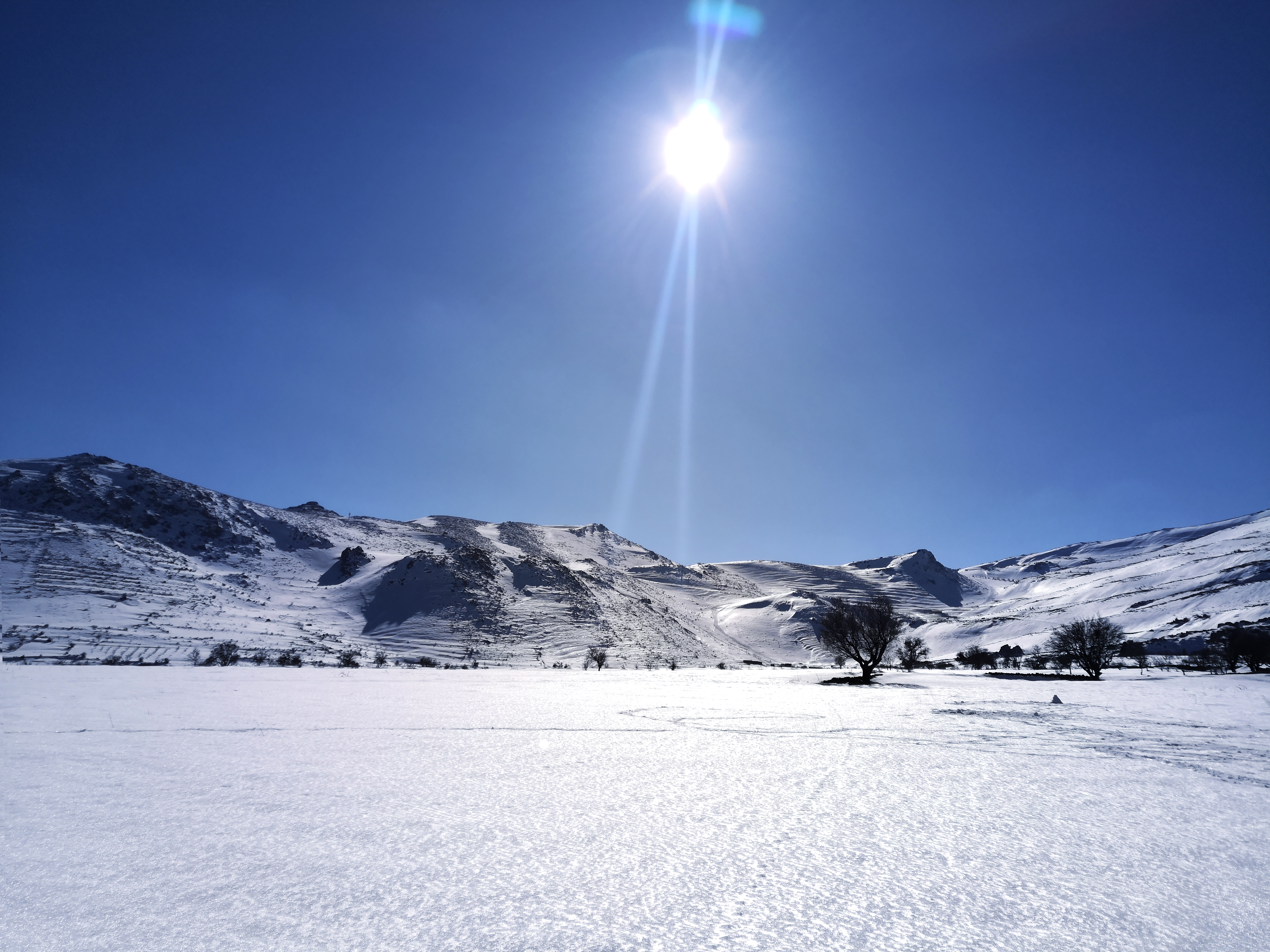
Snowy landscape in the village of Qalaat al-Jandal located on Mount Hermon

The Greeks first built the castle after Alexander the Great's campaign in 333 BC, evidenced by numerous Greek tombs in the area.

In 1015, Emir Jandal bin Qais restored the fortress during the reign of Caliph Al-Hakim bi-Amr Allah, establishing the Emirate of the Janadla, which lasted 170 years. After the Fatimid Caliphate fell to Nur al-Din Zangi, Dahhak bin Jandal al-Biqai rebelled but faced no immediate action as Nur al-Din feared his alliance with the Crusaders. Dahhak later fortified himself in the fortress, but Nur al-Din eventually seized it. It was later neglected until Ibrahim Pasha of Egypt destroyed it during his campaign against the Druze.

In 1838, Eli Smith noted Qalaat al-Jandal's population as Druze and Syriac Christians.

=== Dispute between Christians and the Druze ===
After the year 1925 and the dispute between Christians and the Druze in the village, the Christians began to move to Qatana. No Christians currently remain in it, but they still visit the village because they have agricultural land in it.

=== Israeli Influence In The Area ===
In 2025 several media and local monitoring reports indicated the presence of Israeli military forces in and around Qalaat al-Jandal. Reports from monitoring groups and regional outlets described Israeli military convoys and ground maneuvers entering or operating near the town, and social-media posts circulated an image bearing the logo of Lebanese broadcaster OTV which claimed that construction of a hospital in Qalaat al-Jandal was being supported and equipped by Israel.

As of December 2025 there is no widely accepted independent confirmation by major international organizations that the town is under formal or long-term Israeli occupation, and the situation has been described as fluid due to limited independent access.

== Religious buildings ==
Qalaat al-Jandal contains several Druze shrines and also has two churches:

- St. Michael of the Greek Orthodox Church
- St. George of the Syriac Catholic Church

== See also ==
- Druze in Syria
- Christianity in Syria

== Bibliography ==
- Robinson, E.; Smith, E. (1841). Biblical Researches in Palestine, Mount Sinai and Arabia Petraea: A Journal of Travels in the year 1838. Vol. 3. Boston: Crocker & Brewster.
