= Khan al-Shih offensive (October–November 2016) =

Syrian Army offensive in the Rif Dimashq Governorate

- Part of the Rif Dimashq Governorate campaign (Syrian Civil War)
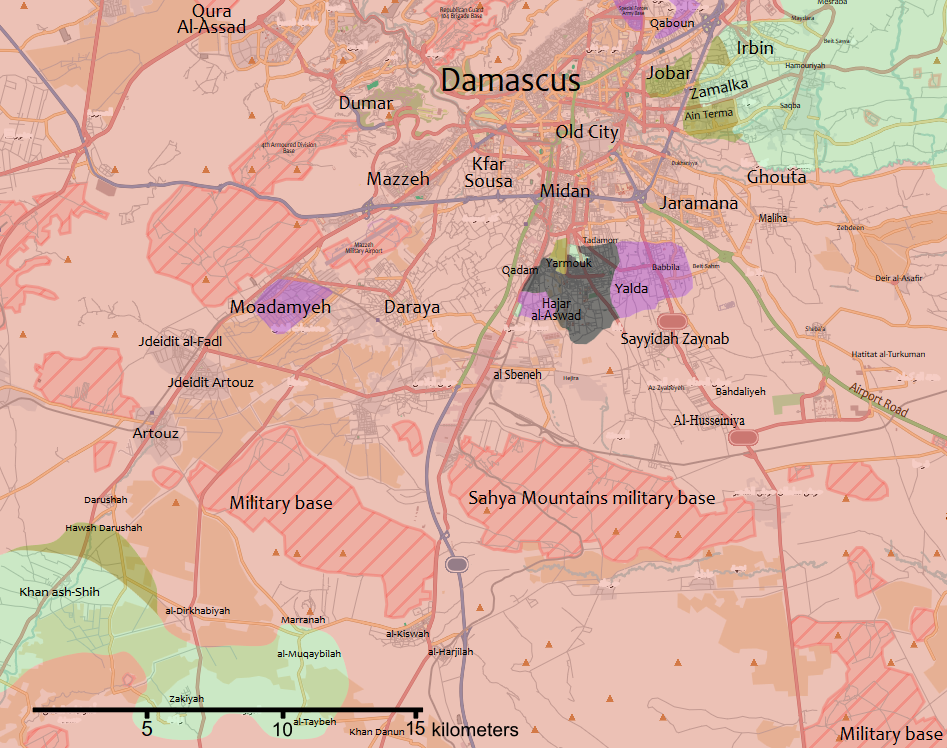
- Map of Damascus in October 2016. The Western Ghouta rebel pocket is in the southwest.
Date	1 October – 30 November 2016 (1 month, 4 weeks and 1 day)
Location	Western Ghouta, Rif Dimashq Governorate, Syria
Result	Syrian Army victory: Army captured the Khan al-Shih rebel pocket of Western Ghouta

Belligerents
(Syria) Syrian Arab Republic: Syrian Armed Forces	Jabhat Fateh al-Sham (surrendered) Ahrar al-Sham (surrendered)

Units involved
Syrian Army: 1st Armoured Division; 4th Armoured Division; 42nd Brigade; 47th Brigade; 7th Mechanized Division	Unknown

Strength
3,700+	1,450–1,846 (at the end of the offensive)

The Khan al-Shih offensive (October–November 2016) was a Syrian Army offensive in the Rif Dimashq Governorate that was launched in early October 2016, as part of the Syrian Civil War. Its aim was to take control of the rebel-held part of western Ghouta. The main rebel stronghold in the region was the town of Khan al-Shih.

== The offensive ==
The offensive was launched on 1 October 2016, with the Army taking control of 10 kilometers of farmland around the town of Deir Khabiyeh, east of Khan al-Shih, within 24 hours. All of Deir Khabiyeh's farmland had been secured by 3 October. Ten days later, the military seized a former air-defense base west of Deir Khabiyeh, partially surrounding the town on its western and southern side. The following day, the Army captured Deir Khabiyeh, after which they turned their focus to Khan al-Shih.

Between 7 and 9 October, government troops captured the Milano Steel factory near Al-Mokaylebah, as well as the Al-Wadi area one kilometer west of the town, while also advancing in the northwestern outskirts of Khan al-Shih.

On 18 October, a potential agreement on a rebel surrender in the town of Zakiyah was reached.

By 21 October, after advancing in the Al-Buwaydah Farms on the southwestern outskirts of Khan al-Shih, government forces broke through rebel lines, securing the southwestern axis of the town. Two days later, the northwestern farms of Khan al-Shih were also captured, partially surrounding the town. On 24 October, a rebel counter-attack at Khan al-Shih was repelled.

On 28 October, Khan al-Shih was fully surrounded after a nearby air-defense base was captured by the Army and thus cutting the rebel's supply route between Khan al-Shih and Zakiyah. On 2 and 3 November, government forces again advanced in the Al-Buwaydah Farms area and ultimately seized the village of Al-Buwaydah on 4 November. On 3 November 33 rebels were killed in the fighting.

On 5 November, the rebels in Khan al-Shih started negotiating to surrender and be evacuated from the area. Concurrently, over the next 24 hours, the Army dropped about 35 barrel bombs on the town. On 6 November, the negotiations collapsed and the Army continued with its operations, taking control of the air-defense housing. Two days later, a rebel counter-attack against Al-Buwaydah Farms was repelled. The Army then proceeded to take control of the Drosha road, tightening the siege of Khan al-Shih, which resulted in a new round of surrender negotiations.

As of 9 November 48 barrel bombs had been dropped on Khan al-Shih and 23 ground-to-ground missiles had been fired at the town. On 10 November, the rebels managed to make some advances in the area between Al-Buwaydah and Deir Khabiyeh. Between 11 and 13 November, another 73 barrel bombs were dropped on Khan al-Shih. During this time, the Army established fire-control over the Zuhair area in the eastern outskirts of Khan al-Shih and managed to fully besiege the town. They also took control of the largest rebel weapons factory in the western Ghouta, an animal farm and Khirbet Khan al-Shih near the Air Defense housing.

A new rebel counter-attack at Khan al-Shih was repelled on 16 November. The following day, the Army took control of farms near the town of Mid’aani, as well as reportedly the Skaik farms of Khan al-Shih.

On 19 November, the Army made new advances with the capture of the Qusur district in the east of Khan al-Shih, while they also advanced again in the west of the town. In the evening, an agreement was reached for the rebels to surrender the town. Under the terms of the agreement, the Army withdrew from the Qusur district it had captured a few hours earlier and a 48-hour ceasefire came into effect. If the ceasefire would hold, the rebels would be evacuated to rebel territory in the Idlib Governorate. 1,000 rebels were to be transferred to Idlib, while those staying would have their cases settled by the Syrian authorities.

On 27 November, the rebels handed in their heavy weapons and 1,450 fighters and 1,400 of their family members departed for Idlib the following day. On 29 November, militants from Zakiyah also handed over control of the town to the Syrian government and set off towards Idlib, while insurgents in three other nearby villages also agreed to withdraw from Western Ghouta. The final batch of rebels from Khan al-Shih and all of the nearby villages was evacuated between 30 November and 1 December, leaving the area firmly under government control.
