= Al-Shawkatliyah =

Coordinates: 33.232102°N 35.971687°E

Al-Shawkatliyah الشوكتلية
- Village
- Location in Syria
- Country: Syria
- Governorate: Rif Dimashq Governorate
- District: Qatana District
- Nahiyah: Sa'sa'

Population (2004 census)
  - Total: 775
- Time zone: UTC+2 (EET)
  - Summer (DST): UTC+3 (EEST)

Al-Shawkatliyah (Arabic: الشوكتلية) is a Syrian village in the Qatana District of the Rif Dimashq Governorate. According to the Syria Central Bureau of Statistics, Al-Shawkatliyah had a population of 775 at the 2004 census. Its inhabitants are predominantly Sunni Muslims.
