= Al-Hubariyah =

Al-Hubariyah الهباريـة
- Village
- Location in Syria
- Coordinates: 33°11′11″N 36°4′0″E
- Country: Syria
- Governorate: Rif Dimashq Governorate
- District: Qatana District
- Nahiyah: Sa'sa'

Population (2004 census)
  - Total: 711
- Time zone: UTC+2 (EET)
  - Summer (DST): UTC+3 (EEST)

Al-Hubariyah (Arabic: الهباريـة) is a Syrian village in the Qatana District of the Rif Dimashq Governorate. According to the Syria Central Bureau of Statistics (CBS), Al-Hubariyah had a population of 711 in the 2004 census. Its inhabitants are predominantly Sunni Muslims.
