= Drousha =

Drousha دروشا
- Town
- Location in Syria
- Coordinates: 33.3828°N 36.1383°E
- Country: Syria
- Governorate: Rif Dimashq Governorate
- District: Qatana District
- Nahiyah: Qatana

Population (2004 census)
  - Total: 6,091
- Time zone: UTC+2 (EET)
  - Summer (DST): UTC+3 (EEST)

Drousha (Arabic: دروشا) is a Syrian town in the Qatana District of the Rif Dimashq Governorate. According to the Syria Central Bureau of Statistics (CBS), Drousha had a population of 6,091 in the 2004 census. Its inhabitants are predominantly Sunni Muslims.
