= Jisr al-Safra =

Jisr al-Safra جسر الصفراء
- Village
- Country: Syria
- Governorate: Rif Dimashq Governorate
- District: Qatana District
- Nahiyah: Sa'sa'

Population (2004 census)
  - Total: 704
- Time zone: UTC+2 (EET)
  - Summer (DST): UTC+3 (EEST)

Jisr al-Safra (Arabic: جسر الصفراء) is a Syrian village in the Qatana District of the Rif Dimashq Governorate, in country's southwestern part. According to the Syria Central Bureau of Statistics, Jisr al-Safra had a population of 704 at the 2004 census. Its inhabitants are predominantly Sunni Muslims.
