= Manshiyat Khan al-Shih =

Manshiyat Khan al-Shih منشية خان الشيح
- Village
- Location in Syria
- Country: Syria
- Governorate: Rif Dimashq Governorate
- District: Qatana District
- Nahiyah: Qatana

Population (2004 census)
  - Total: 2,146
- Time zone: UTC+2 (EET)
  - Summer (DST): UTC+3 (EEST)

Manshiyat Khan al-Shih (Arabic: منشية خان الشيح) is a Syrian village in the Qatana District of the Rif Dimashq Governorate. According to the Syria Central Bureau of Statistics (CBS), Manshiyat Khan al-Shih had a population of 2,146 in the 2004 census. Its inhabitants are predominantly Sunni Muslims.
