= Al-Aamrat =

al-Aamrat العمرات
- Village
- Location in Syria
- Coordinates: 33°30′1″N 36°5′50″E
- Country: Syria
- Governorate: Rif Dimashq Governorate
- District: Qatana District
- Nahiyah: Qatana

Population (2004 census)
  - Total: 427
- Time zone: UTC+2 (EET)
  - Summer (DST): UTC+3 (EEST)

al-Aamrat (Arabic: العمرات) is a Syrian village in the Qatana District of the Rif Dimashq Governorate. According to the Syria Central Bureau of Statistics (CBS), al-Aamrat had a population of 427 in the 2004 census. Its inhabitants are predominantly Sunni Muslims.
