= Al-Nufour =

Al-Nufour النفور
- Village
- Location in Syria
- Coordinates: 33.308489°N 36.105832°E
- Country: Syria
- Governorate: Rif Dimashq Governorate
- District: Qatana District
- Nahiyah: Sa'sa'

Population (2004 census)
  - Total: 1,203
- Time zone: UTC+2 (EET)
  - Summer (DST): UTC+3 (EEST)

Al-Nufour (Arabic: النفور) is a Syrian village in the Qatana District of the Rif Dimashq Governorate. According to the Syria Central Bureau of Statistics (CBS), Al-Nufour had a population of 1,203 in the 2004 census. Its inhabitants are predominantly Sunni Muslims.

== History ==
In 1838, Eli Smith noted Al-Nufour as a village between Damascus and the Hauran.

== Bibliography ==
- Robinson, E.; Smith, E. (1841). Biblical Researches in Palestine, Mount Sinai and Arabia Petraea: A Journal of Travels in the year 1838. Vol. 3. Boston: Crocker & Brewster.
