= Rasem al-Tahin =

Rasem al-Tahin رسم الطحين
- Village
- Country: Syria
- Governorate: Rif Dimashq Governorate
- District: Qatana District
- Nahiyah: Sa'sa'

Population (2004 census)
  - Total: 455
- Time zone: UTC+2 (EET)
  - Summer (DST): UTC+3 (EEST)

Rasem al-Tahin (Arabic: رسم الطحين) is a Syrian village in the Qatana District of the Rif Dimashq Governorate, in the southwestern part of the country. According to the Syria Central Bureau of Statistics, Rasem al-Tahin had a population of 455 at the 2004 census. Its inhabitants are predominantly Sunni Muslims.

During the drought that afflicted Syria between 2006 and 2011, a number of people from the northeastern governorates (Deir ez-Zor, Raqqa and Hasaka) settled in an informal tent settlement on the land of the village.
