= Abou Qawouq =

Abou Qawouq أبو قاووق
- Village
- Location in Syria
- Coordinates: 33°18′34″N 36°3′40″E
- Country: Syria
- Governorate: Rif Dimashq Governorate
- District: Qatana District
- Nahiyah: Sa'sa'

Population (2004 census)
  - Total: 645
- Time zone: UTC+2 (EET)
  - Summer (DST): UTC+3 (EEST)

Abou Qawouq (Arabic: أبو قاووق) is a Syrian village in the Qatana District of the Rif Dimashq Governorate. According to the Syria Central Bureau of Statistics (CBS), Abou Qawouq had a population of 645 in the 2004 census. Its inhabitants are predominantly Sunni Muslims.
