= Kafr Hawr =

Kafr Hawr كفر حور Kafr Hawar
- Village
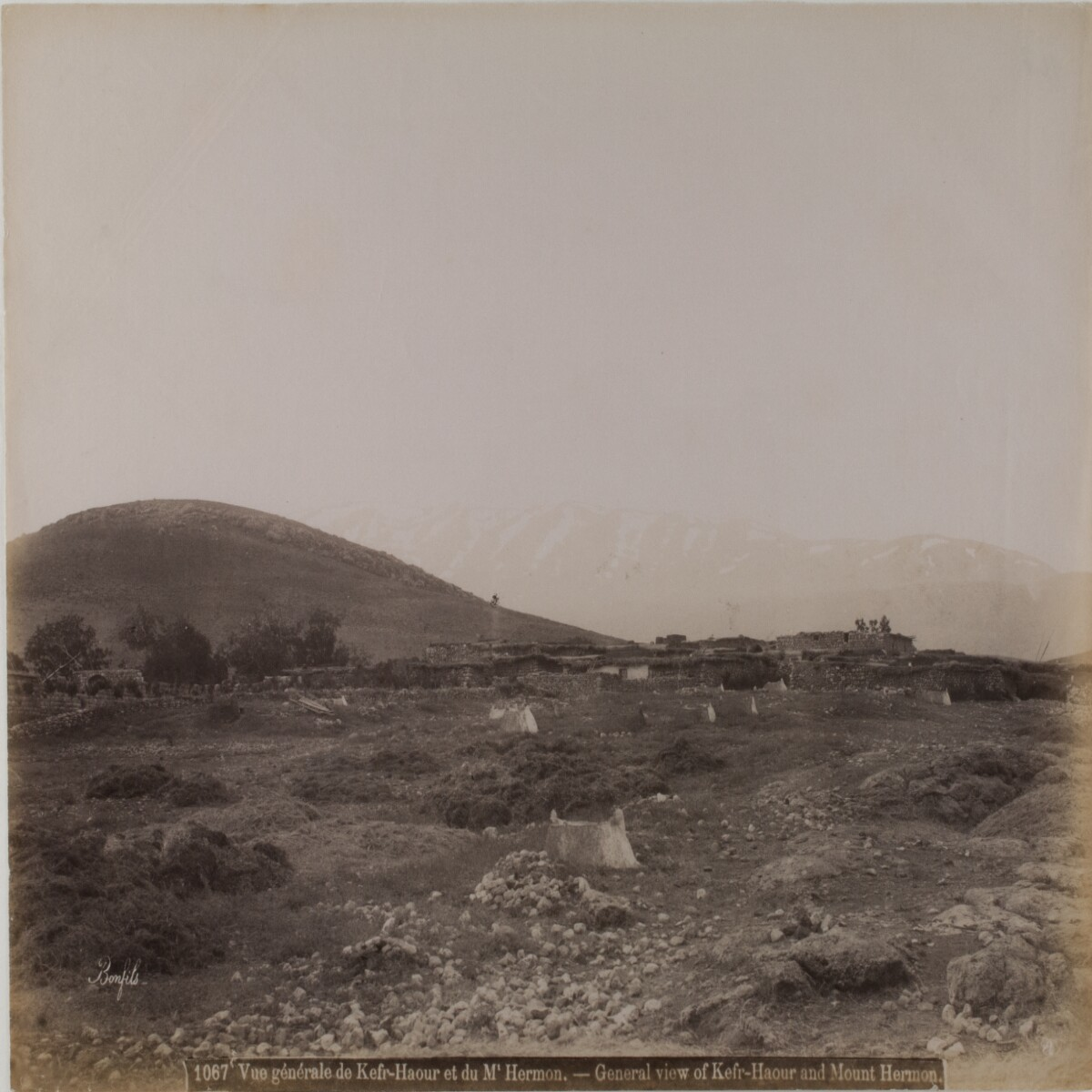
- General view of Kafr Hawr and Mount Hermon in the background, 1867–1914

- Location in Syria
- Coordinates: 33°21′00″N 35°58′00″E
- Country: Syria
- Governorate: Rif Dimashq
- District: Qatana
- Subdistrict: Sa'sa'

Population (2004 census)
  - Total: 2,957
- Time zone: UTC+3 (EET)
  - Summer (DST): UTC+2 (EEST)

Kafr Hawr (Arabic: كفر حور; also spelled Kafr Hawar or Kafr Hur) is a Syrian village situated 35 kilometres (22 mi) southwest of Damascus. According to the Syria Central Bureau of Statistics, the village had a population of 2,957 at the 2004 census. Its inhabitants are predominantly Sunni Muslims.

The village is built into the side of a hill near Mount Hermon, just north of modern-day Hinah, which was an ancient settlement Ptolemy mentioned as Ina. It sits opposite a village called Beitima across a valley through which flows the River 'Arny.

== Korsei el-Debb Roman temple ==
There is a Roman temple in the area called Korsei el-Debb that is one of a group of Temples of Mount Hermon. Félicien de Saulcy suggested the temple was originally constructed entirely of white marble. A marble block was found featuring a dedication to a goddess called Hierapolis (also identified as Atargatis and Leukothea).

== History ==
In 1838, Eli Smith noted Kafr Hawr as a predominantly Sunni Muslim village.

== Bibliography ==
- Robinson, E.; Smith, E. (1841). Biblical Researches in Palestine, Mount Sinai and Arabia Petraea: A Journal of Travels in the year 1838. Vol. 3. Boston: Crocker & Brewster.
