= Khirbet al-Sawda, Rif Dimashq =

Khirbet al-Sawda خربة السودا
- Village
- Location in Syria
- Coordinates: 33°23′20″N 35°55′38″E
- Country: Syria
- Governorate: Rif Dimashq
- District: Qatana
- Subdistrict: Beit Jinn

Population (2004 census)
  - Total: 124
- Time zone: UTC+2 (EET)
  - Summer (DST): UTC+3 (EEST)

Khirbet al-Sawda (Arabic: خربة السودا) is a Syrian village in the Beit Jinn sub-district of Qatana District, in the Rif Dimashq Governorate. According to the Syria Central Bureau of Statistics, Khirbet al-Sawda had a population of 124 at the 2004 census. Its inhabitants are predominantly from the Druze community.

== History ==
The presence of Druze around Mount Hermon is documented since the founding of the Druze religion in the beginning of the 11th century.

In 1838, Eli Smith noted Khirbet al-Sawda's population as Druze and Antiochian Greek Christians.

== See also ==
- Druze in Syria
- Christianity in Syria
