= Ras al-Ayn, Qatana =

Ras al-Ayn رأس العين
- Village
- Location in Syria
- Coordinates: 33.534310°N 36.061637°E
- Country: Syria
- Governorate: Rif Dimashq Governorate
- District: Qatana District
- Nahiyah: Qatana

Population (2004 census)
  - Total: 892
- Time zone: UTC+2 (EET)
  - Summer (DST): UTC+3 (EEST)

Ras al-Ayn (Arabic: رأس العين) is a Syrian village in the Qatana District of the Rif Dimashq Governorate. According to the Syria Central Bureau of Statistics (CBS), Ras al-Ayn had a population of 892 in the 2004 census. Its inhabitants are predominantly Sunni Muslims.
