= Khan al-Shih camp =

Palestinian refugee camp

Khan al-Shih camp is a Palestinian refugee camp located next to the ancient ruins of Khan al-Shih, 27 kilometers southwest of Damascus, which was historically a stopping point for trade convoys between Damascus and the southwest.

The camp provided shelter to the first refugees from Palestine when the 1948 Palestine War began. The camp was established in 1949 on an area of land of 0.69 square kilometers. Most of the refugees in the camp are from the northern parts of Palestine, and many today have good degrees of education and work as teachers or as civil servants. The others work as farmers on Syrian-owned land and handicraft workers in nearby workshops.The camp has a high school, two primary and preparatory schools and a health clinic run by UNRWA.

== Population ==
The camp is inhabited by approximately 30,000 and most of the refugees in the camp descend from the upper Galilee areas of the cities of Tiberias, Nazareth and Safed in Palestine, and many of them today have good degrees of education and work as teachers or as civil servants, while others work as farmers on Syrian-owned land and as manual workers in neighboring workshops.

== Marital status ==
The social and economic development in the camp is slow and governed by a number of subjective factors that distinguish it from other Palestinian communities in Syria, as the community structure limited the development programs that benefited other communities, which led to a distortion in infrastructure and services. Two years after the civil war in Syria the camp was subjected to a siege, a few families from the camp left for Europe in search of humanitarian asylum.
