= Qatana District =

Qatana District منطقة قطنا
- District
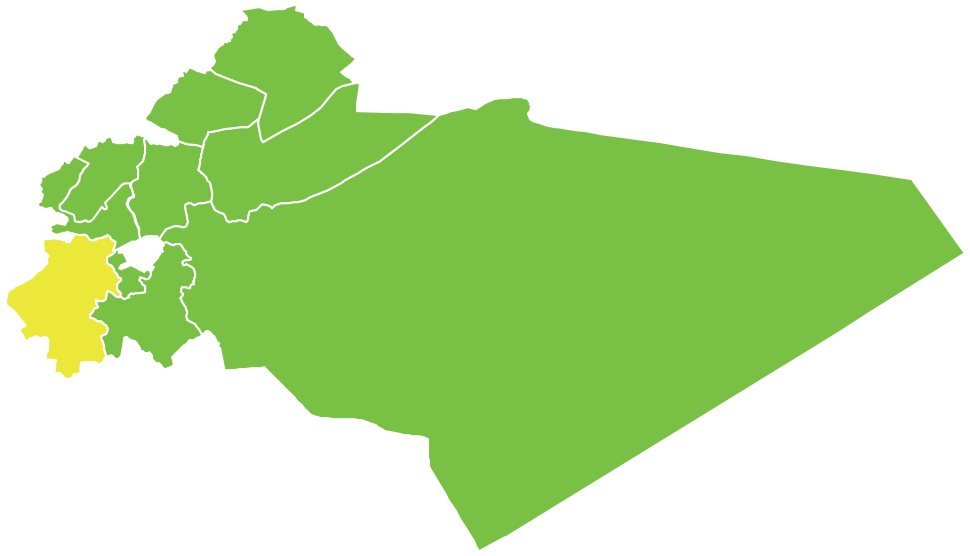
- Map of Qatana District within Rif Dimashq Governorate
- Coordinates (Qatana): 33.43°N 36.08°E
- Country: Syria
- Governorate: Rif Dimashq
- Seat: Qatana
- Subdistricts: 3 nawāḥī

Area
  - Total: 995.48 km^{2} (384.36 sq mi)

Population (2004)
  - Total: 207,245
  - Density: 208.19/km^{2} (539.20/sq mi)
- Geocode: SY0308

Qatana District (Arabic: منطقة قطنا, romanized: minṭaqat Qaṭana) is a district of the Rif Dimashq Governorate in southern Syria.

The district is located just to the east of Mount Hermon. Administrative centre is the city of Qatana. At the 2004 census, the district had a population of 207,245.

== Sub-districts ==
The district of Qatana is divided into three sub-districts or nawāḥī (population as of 2004):

Subdistricts of Qatana District
Code	Name	Area	Population
SY030800	Qatana Subdistrict	506.56 km^{2}	146,344
SY030801	Beit Jen Subdistrict	159.84 km^{2}	15,668
SY030802	Sa'sa' Subdistrict	329.08 km^{2}	45,233

== Localities in Qatana District ==
According to the Central Bureau of Statistics (CBS), the following villages, towns and cities make up the district of Qatana:

English Name	Arabic Name	Population	Subdistrict
Jdeidat Artouz	جديدة عرطوز	45,000	Qatana
Qatana	قطنا	33,996	Qatana
Artouz	عرطوز	16,199	Qatana
Kanaker	كناكر	13,950	Sa'sa'
Khan al-Shih	خان الشيح	12,148	Qatana
al-Sabboura	الصبورة	10,969	Qatana
Sa'sa'	سعسع	9,945	Sa'sa'
Drousha	دروشا	6,091	Qatana
Mazraat Beit Jen	مزرعة بيت جن	5,073	Beit Jen
Yaafour	يعفور	4,638	Qatana
Beitima	بيتيما	3,366	Sa'sa'
Qalaat al-Jandal	قلعة الجندل	3,251	Qatana
Deir Maker	دير ماكر	3,228	Sa'sa'
Arnah	عرنة	3,146	Qatana
Beit Saber	بيت سابر	3,021	Sa'sa'
Kafr Hawr	كفر حور	2,957	Sa'sa'
Beit Jen	بيت جن	2,846	Beit Jen
Harfa	حرفا	2,362	Beit Jen
Beqaasem	بقعسم	2,268	Qatana
Manshiyat Khan al-Shih	منشية خان الشيح	2,146	Qatana
Darbal	دربل	2,049	Beit Jen
Hinah	حينة	1,524	Beit Jen
al-Nufour	النفور	1,203	Sa'sa'
Kawkab	كوكب	1,188	Qatana
Rima	ريمه	1,132	Qatana
al-Bejaa	البجاع	1,058	Qatana
Kafr Qouq	كفرقوق	1,015	Qatana
Denaji	دناجي	933	Sa'sa'
Ras al-Ayn	رأس العين	892	Qatana
al-Shawkatliyah	الشوكتلية	775	Sa'sa'
Dourin	دورين	750	Sa'sa'
Hamrit	حمريت	737	Sa'sa'
Maas	ماعص	719	Sa'sa'
al-Hubariyah	الهباريـة	711	Sa'sa'
Jisr al-Safra	جسر الصفراء	704	Sa'sa'
Ain al-Shaara	عين الشعره	659	Beit Jen
Abou Qawouq	أبو قاووق	645	Sa'sa'
Maghar al-Mir	مغرالمير	588	Beit Jen
al-Qleiaah	القليعة	533	Sa'sa'
Rasem al-Tahin	رسم الطحين	455	Sa'sa'
al-Maqrousa	المقروصه	443	Beit Jen
al-Aamrat	العمرات	427	Qatana
Ambiya	أمبيا	412	Qatana
Rakhlah	رخلة	368	Qatana
Hosh al-Nufour	حوش النفور	363	Sa'sa'
al-Adnaniyah	العدنانية	238	Sa'sa'
Kherbet al-Sawda	خربة السودا	124	Beit Jen
