= Picturing War =

- Film Poster "Picturing War"
- Directed by: Konstantin Flemig
- Written by: Konstantin Flemig
- Produced by: Christian Cramer-Clausbruch, Mette Gunnar
- Starring: Benjamin Hiller
- Cinematography: Peter Wedig
- Edited by: Anna Mentele
- Release date: 2016
- Running time: 60 minutes
- Country: Germany
- Languages: German, English, Kurdish, Arabic

Picturing War is a 2016 documentary film, directed by Konstantin Flemig. It was shot in Iraqi Kurdistan, Syria, Rwanda, as well as in Germany, France and the Netherlands. Its original German title is BilderKrieg.

The film was produced by German public broadcaster SWR and will be aired in late 2016. It played a successful festival run in 2016 and won the Hollywood International Independent Documentary Award for best Student Feature Documentary as well as the Special Mention Award at the International Open Film Festival.

== Director ==
Konstantin Flemig graduated from Deutsche Journalistenschule and studied directing and screenwriting at Film Academy Baden-Württemberg. Picturing War is his first feature-length documentary. He attended Werner Herzog's Rogue Film School.

== Synopsis ==
Picturing War follows freelance journalist and war photographer Benjamin Hiller, who is traveling to conflict zones around the world. The first station is Iraqi Kurdistan, where the filmmakers visit the front line between Peshmerga and ISIL. Hiller portrays the situation of the Christian refugees. In Rwanda, he visits the infamous Murambi Genocide Memorial, where 20 years earlier tens of thousands of people were murdered. Back in the Middle East, Hiller crosses the border into Syria to report about Yazidi refugees and the female fighters of the YPJ who rescued them.

In Europe, the film crew follows the images that Hiller took during the travels into the newsroom of taz in Berlin, the working place of the editor-in-chief of Corbis in Marseille, and the World Press Photo Award in Amsterdam.

== Awards and festivals ==
- Hollywood International Independent Award, Los Angeles/CA (Winner)
- International Open Film Festival, Dhaka/Bangladesh (Special Mention Award)
- USA Film Festival, Dallas/Texas (Official Selection)
- Chicago International Social Change Film Festival, Chicago/Illinois (Official Selection)
- Human District Film Festival, Belgrade/Serbia (Official Selection)
- Cinefest, Los Angeles/CA (Official Selection)
- Human Rights Film Festival, Barcelona/Spain (Official Selection)
