= Al-Bejaa =

Coordinates: 33.5333°N 36.1450°E

Al-Bejaa البجاع
- Village
- Location in Syria
- Country: Syria
- Governorate: Rif Dimashq Governorate
- District: Qatana District
- Nahiyah: Qatana

Population (2004 census)
  - Total: 1,058
- Time zone: UTC+2 (EET)
  - Summer (DST): UTC+3 (EEST)

Al-Bejaa (Arabic: البجاع) is a Syrian village in the Qatana District of the Rif Dimashq Governorate. According to the Syria Central Bureau of Statistics (CBS), Al-Bejaa had a population of 1,058 in the 2004 census. Its inhabitants are predominantly Sunni Muslims.
