= Ambiya =

Coordinates: 33°27′0″N 36°2′41″E

Ambiya أمبيا
- Village
- Location in Syria
- Country: Syria
- Governorate: Rif Dimashq Governorate
- District: Qatana District
- Nahiyah: Qatana

Population (2004 census)
  - Total: 412
- Time zone: UTC+2 (EET)
  - Summer (DST): UTC+3 (EEST)

Ambiya (Arabic: أمبيا) is a Syrian village in the Qatana District of the Rif Dimashq Governorate. According to the Syria Central Bureau of Statistics (CBS), Ambiya had a population of 412 in the 2004 census. Its inhabitants are predominantly from the Druze community.

== See also ==
- Druze in Syria
