= Kafr Qouq, Syria =

Coordinates: 33°29′N 36°03′E

Kafr Qouq كفرقوق Kafr Qawq
- Village
- Location in Syria
- Country: Syria
- Governorate: Rif Dimashq Governorate
- District: Qatana District
- Nahiyah: Qatana

Population (2004 census)
  - Total: 1,015
- Time zone: UTC+2 (EET)
  - Summer (DST): UTC+3 (EEST)

Kafr Qouq or Kafr Qawq (Arabic: كفرقوق) is a Syrian village in the Qatana District of the Rif Dimashq Governorate. According to the Syria Central Bureau of Statistics (CBS), Kafr Qouq had a population of 1,015 in the 2004 census. Its inhabitants are predominantly Sunni Muslims.
