= Hosh al-Nufour =

Hosh al-Nufour حوش النفور Hawsh al-Nufour
- Village
- Location in Syria
- Country: Syria
- Governorate: Rif Dimashq Governorate
- District: Qatana District
- Nahiyah: Sa'sa'

Population (2004 census)
  - Total: 363
- Time zone: UTC+2 (EET)
  - Summer (DST): UTC+3 (EEST)

Hosh al-Nufour or Hawsh al-Nufour (Arabic: حوش النفور) is a Syrian village in the Qatana District of the Rif Dimashq Governorate. According to the Syria Central Bureau of Statistics (CBS), Hosh al-Nufour had a population of 363 in the 2004 census. Its inhabitants are predominantly Sunni Muslims.
