= Maghar al-Mir =

Maghar al-Mir مغرالمير Mugher al-Mir
- Village
- Location in Syria
- Coordinates: 33°18′29″N 35°58′7″E
- Country: Syria
- Governorate: Rif Dimashq
- District: Qatana
- Subdistrict: Beit Jinn

Population (2004 census)
  - Total: 588
- Time zone: UTC+2 (EET)
  - Summer (DST): UTC+3 (EEST)

Maghar al-Mir (Arabic: مغرالمير; also known as al-Mughr or Mugher al-Mir) is a Syrian village in the Qatana District of the Rif Dimashq Governorate. According to the Syria Central Bureau of Statistics, Maghar al-Mir had a population of 588 at the 2004 census. Its inhabitants are predominantly from the Druze community.

The presence of Druze around Mount Hermon is documented since the founding of the Druze religion in the beginning of the 11th century. The village was founded in the 1930s by settlers from the villages of Ayn al-Burj and Hinah. Maghar al-Mir had an Olympian come out of their country namely Zid Abou Hamed, the Australian-Syrian hurdler.

== See also ==
- Druze in Syria
