= Ain al-Shaara =

Ain al-Shaara عين الشعرة
- Village
- Location in Syria
- Coordinates: 33°22′25″N 35°56′0″E
- Country: Syria
- Governorate: Rif Dimashq Governorate
- District: Qatana District
- Nahiyah: Beit Jen

Population (2004 census)
  - Total: 659
- Time zone: UTC+2 (EET)
  - Summer (DST): UTC+3 (EEST)

Ain al-Shaara (Arabic: عين الشعرة) is a Syrian village in the Qatana District of the Rif Dimashq Governorate. According to the Syria Central Bureau of Statistics (CBS), Ain al-Shaara had a population of 659 in the 2004 census. The inhabitants of Ain al-Shaara are predominantly Druze and Christians.

== History ==
The presence of Druze around Mount Hermon is documented since the founding of the Druze religion in the beginning of the 11th century.

In 1838, Eli Smith noted Ain al-Shaara's population as Druze and Antiochian Greek Christians.

== Religious buildings ==
Ain al-Shaara has three churches:

- St. George of the Greek Orthodox Church
- St. George of the Melkite Greek Catholic Church
- National Evangelical Church

== See also ==
- Druze in Syria
- Christianity in Syria

== Bibliography ==
- Robinson, E.; Smith, E. (1841). Biblical Researches in Palestine, Mount Sinai and Arabia Petraea: A Journal of Travels in the year 1838. Vol. 3. Boston: Crocker & Brewster.
