= Jubb al-Safa =

Jubb Safa جب الصفا Jeb Safa
- Village
- Location within Syria
- Coordinates: 33°13′56″N 36°18′53″E
- Country: Syria
- Governorate: Rif Dimashq Governorate
- District: Markaz Rif Dimashq
- Nahiya: Al-Kiswah
- Elevation: 676 m (2,217 ft)

Population (2004)
  - Total: 2,499
- Time zone: UTC+3 (EET)
  - Summer (DST): UTC+2 (EEST)

Jubb al-Safa (Arabic: جب الصفا; also spelled Jeb Safa) is a village in southern Syria, administratively part of the Markaz Rif Dimashq District of the Rif Dimashq Governorate, located just east of Damascus. Nearby localities include al-Buwaydah to the southeast, al-Masmiyah to the south, Ghabaghib to the southwest, Kanakir to the west, Khan Dannun to the northwest, Deir Ali to the north and Khirbet al-Ward to the northeast. According to the Syria Central Bureau of Statistics (CBS), Beit Sawa had a population of 2,499 in the 2004 census.
