= Hinah =

Hinah حينة Heeneh
- Village
- Location in Syria
- Coordinates: 33°21′N 35°57′E
- Country: Syria
- Governorate: Rif Dimashq
- District: Qatana
- Nahiyah: Beit Jinn

Population (2004 census)
  - Total: 1,524
- Time zone: UTC+2 (EET)
  - Summer (DST): UTC+3 (EEST)

Hinah (Arabic: حينة) is a village in Syria, on the slopes of Mount Hermon. Administratively, it belongs to the Qatana District of the Rif Dimashq Governorate. According to the Syria Central Bureau of Statistics, Hinah had a population of 1,524 in 2004. Its inhabitants are predominantly Christians, with a Druze community present as well.

Hinah is renowned for the quality of its anise, which is sourced here by arak distillers throughout the region.

== History ==
In 1838, Eli Smith noted Hinah's population as consisting of Antiochian Greek Christians and Druze.

Historical geographer Samuel Klein pointed out that in the immediate environs of Hinah and neighbouring Rimah, there is a large reservoir (birket) containing more than 500 cubic metres (500,000 L) of water for irrigation of crops.

The outbreak of the Syrian civil war in 2011 prompted local distillers to buy anise in bulk, in anticipation of logistical problems.

Following the Israeli invasion of Syria in December 2024, the village was placed under the control of the Israeli military.

== Religious buildings ==
Hinah has two churches:

- St. Elias Greek Orthodox Church
- St. Elias Greek Catholic Church

== See also ==
- Christianity in Syria
- Druze in Syria
