= Deir Maker =

Deir Maker دير ماكر
- Village
- Location in Syria
- Coordinates: 33°14′N 36°02′E
- Country: Syria
- Governorate: Rif Dimashq Governorate
- District: Qatana District
- Nahiyah: Sa'sa'

Population (2004 census)
  - Total: 3,228
- Time zone: UTC+2 (EET)
  - Summer (DST): UTC+3 (EEST)

Deir Maker (Arabic: دير ماكر) is a Syrian village in the Qatana District of the Rif Dimashq Governorate. According to the Syria Central Bureau of Statistics, Deir Maker had a population of 3,228 at the 2004 census. Its inhabitants are predominantly Sunni Muslims.

== Archaeology ==
Ancient remains in Deir Maker include two buildings possibly dating to the Roman period, Greek and Syriac inscriptions, decorated stones, and a broken statue of a naked youth.
