= Al-Kiswah =

Al-Kiswah الكسوة Kissoué Kiswe
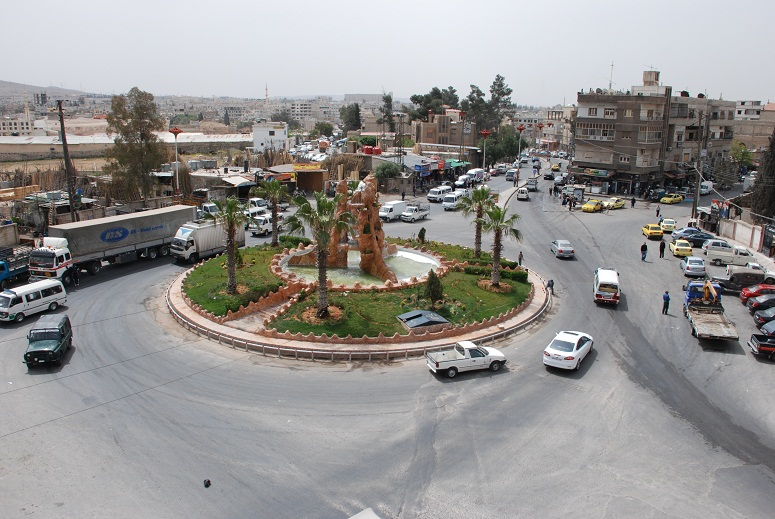
- Al-Kiswe town center

- Location in Syria
- Coordinates: 33°21′N 36°14′E
- Country: Syria
- Governorate: Rif Dimashq
- District: Markaz Rif Dimashq
- Subdistrict: al-Kiswah
- Elevation: 720 m (2,360 ft)

Population (2004 census)
  - Total: 43,456

Al-Kiswah (Arabic: الكسوة Al Kiswah also spelled Kissoué/Kiswe) is a city in the Rif Dimashq Governorate, Syria. It is located approximately 13 kilometres (8 miles) south of Damascus. It was the location of the 1303 Battle of Marj al-Saffar, and the childhood home of Adnan Awad.

Administratively, Al-Kiswah belongs to Markaz Rif Dimashq district. It is one of the largest towns of the district by terms of population.

== Overview ==
Al-Kiswah is made up of more than 22 villages, which are: (Al-Kiswah city, Al-Kiswah military housing, Al-Harjala military housing, Deir Ali military housing, Al-Dulab military housing, Western displaced housing, Eastern displaced housing, Al-Harjala displaced housing, Al-Harjala, Marana, Al-Maqilibah, Al-Ma’aliyah, Wadi Al-Ma’aliyah, Al-Taybeh, Khiyarat Danun, Al-Majidiyah, Deir Ali, Deir Khabiyeh, Jab Al-Safa, Qara, Al-Adliyeh, Al-Matla, Khirbet Al-Shiab, Za’bar, Marjana, Umm Al-Awamid, Al-Sa’ada, Rasm Zebib)

Al-Kiswah is an ancient city with remains of Roman tombs and columns. Due to its location, it constitutes a strategic site for defending Damascus from the south. It was the seat of some kings of the Ghassanid Kingdom during the Byzantine era, and it was where messengers of the Roman kings were killed when they came to collect tribute.

== Landmarks ==
A water mill powered by the waters of the Awaj River.

There is also a clock located at one of the Hejaz Railway stations in the city of Al-Kiswah.

The Al-Kiswah Football Stadium, founded by Ahmad Suad al-Din al-Zarkali.

The Great Al-Kiswah Mosque, which is classified as a monument by the Syrian Ministry of Antiquities.

The baths and the Al-Kiswah Municipal Football Stadium, founded by Ahmad Suad al-Din al-Zarkali.

== History ==
The name "al-Kiswah" means "the garment". According to a tradition related by Yaqut al-Hamawi, this is because the king of Rum sent some messengers to demand tribute from a figure named King Ghassan; he had the messengers killed and then, at the site of al-Kiswah, he had their garments divided up.

=== Battle of Marj al-Saffur ===
The Battle of Shaqhab, also known as the Battle of Marj al-Sufr, began on the 2nd of Ramadan 702 AH / April 20, 1303 AD, and lasted for three days on the Shaqhab Plain near Damascus, Syria. The battle was fought between the Mamluks, led by al-Nasir Muhammad ibn Qalawun, Sultan of Egypt and the Levant, and the Mongols, led by Qutlushah, the deputy and general of Mahmud Ghazan, the Mongol Ilkhan of Persia (Ilkhanate). The battle ended in a Muslim victory, ending Mahmud Ghazan's ambitions to control the Levant and expand into the Islamic world.

Yaqut and Ibn Battuta both described al-Kiswah as the first stage on the hajj route out of Damascus. Abu'l-Fida similarly described al-Kiswah as a stopping place on the road south of Damascus and added that between the two places, the road went through a "beautiful pass" called the 'Aqabah ash-Shuhūrah. He also wrote that it lay on a stream called the Nahr al-A'waj which flowed down from the "mountain of snow", i.e. Mount Hermon.

In 1838, Eli Smith noted el-Kesweh as being located in the Wady el-'Ajam, and being populated by Sunni Muslims.

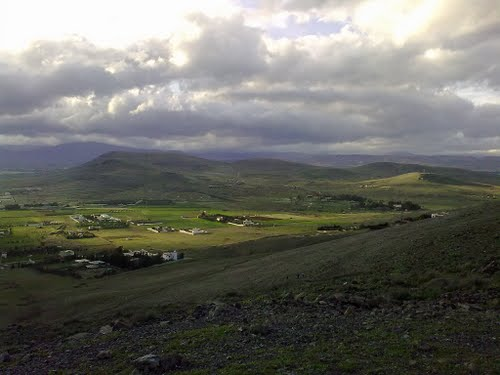
Kiswah farms

== Bibliography ==
- Le Strange, G. (1890). Palestine Under the Moslems: A Description of Syria and the Holy Land from A.D. 650 to 1500. London: Committee of the Palestine Exploration Fund. OCLC 1004386.
- Robinson, E.; Smith, E. (1841). Biblical Researches in Palestine, Mount Sinai and Arabia Petraea: A Journal of Travels in the year 1838. Vol. 3. Boston: Crocker & Brewster.
