= Rima, Qatana =

Rima الريمة
- Village
- Location in Syria
- Coordinates: 33°23′7″N 35°54′13″E
- Country: Syria
- Governorate: Rif Dimashq Governorate
- District: Qatana District
- Nahiyah: Qatana

Population (2004 census)
  - Total: 1,132
- Time zone: UTC+2 (EET)
  - Summer (DST): UTC+3 (EEST)

Rima (Arabic: الريمة) is a Syrian village in the Qatana District of the Rif Dimashq Governorate. According to the Syria Central Bureau of Statistics (CBS), Rima had a population of 1,132 in the 2004 census. Its inhabitants are predominantly Druze.

== History ==
The presence of Druze around Mount Hermon is documented since the founding of the Druze religion in the beginning of the 11th century.

In 1838, Eli Smith noted Rima's population as Druze and Antiochian Greek Christians.

== See also ==
- Druze in Syria
- Christianity in Syria

== Bibliography ==
- Robinson, E.; Smith, E. (1841). Biblical Researches in Palestine, Mount Sinai and Arabia Petraea: A Journal of Travels in the year 1838. Vol. 3. Boston: Crocker & Brewster.
