= Pharpar =

River in Syria

Coordinates: 33°25′N 36°08′E

Pharpar (or Pharphar in the Douay–Rheims Bible) is a biblical river in Syria. It is the less important of the two rivers of Damascus mentioned in the Book of Kings (2 Kings 5:12), now generally identified with the Nahr al-Awaj (literally, 'crooked river'), although if the reference to Damascus is limited to the city, as in the Arabic version of the Old Testament, Pharpar would be the modern Taura. In the early Baedeker Guides it was identified as the Al-Sabirani, a fairly downstream tributary of the Awaj. The stream runs from west to east, flowing from Hermon south of Damascus, and like its companion Abana River travels across the plain of Damascus, which owes to them much of its fertility. The river loses itself in marshes, or Lakes of the Marj, as they are called, on the borders of the great Arabian Desert.

John MacGregor, who gives a description of it in his book Rob Roy on the Jordan, affirmed that as a work of hydraulic engineering, the system and construction of the canals, by which the Pharpar and Abana were used for irrigation, might be considered as one of the most complete and extensive in the world. In the Bible, Naaman exclaims that the Abana and Pharpar are greater than all the waters of Israel (2 Kings 5:12).

== See also ==
- Amana (bible)
