= Darbal =

Darbal دربل Durbul
- Village
- Location in Syria
- Coordinates: 33°21′19″N 35°54′45″E
- Country: Syria
- Governorate: Rif Dimashq Governorate
- District: Qatana District
- Nahiyah: Beit Jen

Population (2004 census)
  - Total: 2,049
- Time zone: UTC+2 (EET)
  - Summer (DST): UTC+3 (EEST)

Darbal (Arabic: دربل, also spelled Durbul or Dirbul) is a Syrian village in the Qatana District of the Rif Dimashq Governorate. According to the Syria Central Bureau of Statistics (CBS), Darbal had a population of 2,049 at the 2004 census. Its inhabitants are predominantly Sunni Muslims.

== History ==
In 1838, Eli Smith noted Darbal's population as predominantly Sunni Muslim.

The village was captured by Syrian rebels early in the Syrian Civil War, but by 11 November 2013 it had been retaken by regime forces.

== Bibliography ==
- Robinson, E.; Smith, E. (1841). Biblical Researches in Palestine, Mount Sinai and Arabia Petraea: A Journal of Travels in the year 1838. Vol. 3. Boston: Crocker & Brewster.
