= Harfa =

Harfa حرفا
- Village
- Location in Syria
- Coordinates: 33°16′0″N 35°54′45″E
- Country: Syria
- Governorate: Rif Dimashq
- District: Qatana
- Subdistrict: Beit Jinn

Population (2004 census)
  - Total: 2,362
- Time zone: UTC+2 (EET)
  - Summer (DST): UTC+3 (EEST)

Harfa (Arabic: حرفا) is a Syrian village in the Qatana District of the Rif Dimashq Governorate. According to the Syria Central Bureau of Statistics, Harfa had a population of 2,362 at the 2004 census. Its inhabitants are predominantly from the Druze community.

== History ==
An archaeological survey conducted in Harfa in the 1970s documented what appears to be a monumental mausoleum dating to the Roman period.

The presence of Druze around Mount Hermon is documented since the founding of the Druze religion in the beginning of the 11th century.

== See also ==
- Druze in Syria
