= Arnah =

Arnah عرنة
- Village
- Location in Syria
- Coordinates: 33°22′1″N 35°52′44″E
- Country: Syria
- Governorate: Rif Dimashq
- District: Qatana
- Subdistrict: Qatana

Population (2004 census)
  - Total: 3,146
- Time zone: UTC+2 (EET)
  - Summer (DST): UTC+3 (EEST)

Arnah (Arabic: عرنة) is a Syrian village in the Qatana District of the Rif Dimashq Governorate. According to the Syria Central Bureau of Statistics (CBS), Arnah had a population of 3,146 at the 2004 census. Its inhabitants are predominantly Druze and Christians.

== History ==
In 1838, Eli Smith noted Arnah's population as Druze and Antiochian Greek Christians.

Since December 2024, the town has been under Israeli control.

== Religious buildings ==
- St. George of the Greek Orthodox Church

== See also ==
- Druze in Syria
- Christianity in Syria

== Bibliography ==
- Robinson, E.; Smith, E. (1841). Biblical Researches in Palestine, Mount Sinai and Arabia Petraea: A Journal of Travels in the year 1838. Vol. 3. Boston: Crocker & Brewster.
