= Sa'sa', Syria =

Sa'sa' سعسع Saasaa
- Town
- Location within Syria
- Coordinates: 33.28°N 36.02°E
- Country: Syria
- Governorate: Rif Dimashq
- District: Qatana
- Subdistrict: Sa'sa'

Population (2004 census)
  - Total: 9,945
- Time zone: UTC+2 (EET)
  - Summer (DST): UTC+3 (EEST)

Sa'sa' (Arabic: سعسع, romanized: Saʾsaʾ, also spelled Saasaa) is a town in southwestern Syria, administratively part of the Rif Dimashq Governorate, located southwest of Damascus near the Golan Heights (Quneitra Governorate), in the portion of the province under Syrian control. Nearby localities include Kafr Hawr to the north, Kanaker to the east, Khan Arnabah to the southwest, and Deir Maker to the south. According to the Syria Central Bureau of Statistics, Sa'sa' had a population of 9,945 in the 2004 census. The town is also the administrative centre of—though not the largest town in—the Sa'sa' nahiyah, which is made up of 19 settlements having a combined population of 45,233.

From the medieval period, Sa'sa' gained importance as a halting place on the road between Damascus and Jerusalem. In the 1580s, the Ottomans invested in establishing a village and caravansary complex in Sa'sa' to serve the travelers and pilgrims stopping there and protecting them from Bedouin depredations. The partly intact remains of the 16th-century caravansary complex, Khan Sa'sa', are located in the old village on the north side of the modern town.

== History ==
A 1480 travelogue by Abu'l-Baqa ibn al-Ji'an listed Sa'sa' as both a caravanserai (khan) and stop on the postal route (barid) in between al-Murayj and Khan Arnabah, which the Mamluk sultan Qaytbay stopped by on his way to Damascus. According to Katia Cytryn-Silverman, Qaytbay had patronized the renovation of the existing khan in Sa'sa' in 1477.

In 1581, Sa'sa' was recorded as an isolated way station close to Damascus and on the road to Jerusalem. Pilgrims to Jerusalem and traders traveling the road suffered frequent attacks by Bedouins. To make it safer, the Ottoman imperial government, at the recommendation of the qadi of Damascus, issued firmans to the governor of Damascus to establish a village at Sa'sa', calling for the voluntary settlement of 200 peasant families who would be exempt from imperial taxes, and the holding of a weekly market there. The governor of Damascus in 1586–1588, Sinan Pasha, built a mosque in Sa'sa'.

In May 1771, the forces of the rebel governor of Egypt, Ali Bey, led by Abu al-Dhahab, encamped at Sa'sa' before occupying Damascus.

== Khan Sa'sa' ==
The remains of Khan Sa'sa' are located on the north side of the town, in the old village along the A'waj River. The remains of the complex, namely the seraya (administrator's building) and the arched gateways, are largely intact. They were partly damaged and demolished by the Israeli Army during the 1974 disengagement with Syria, following the 1973 Arab-Israeli war. As of the late 2000s, there were reports that its grounds were being encroached upon by residents building their homes inside and abutting the structure.

== Bibliography ==
- Cytryn-Silverman, Katia (2016). The Road Inns (Khāns) in Bilād al-Shām. Oxford: BAR Publishing. ISBN 9781407336718.
- Heyd, Uriel (1960). Ottoman Documents on Palestine, 1552–1615. Oxford: Oxford University Press.
- Rafeq, Abdul-Karim (1966). The Province of Damascus, 1723–1783. Beirut: Khayats.
- Sabbagh, Leila (2001). "Aspects of Intellectual Life in the Arab Provinces during the Ottoman Period". In İhsanoğlu, Ekmeleddin (ed.). History of the Ottoman State, Society & Civilisation, Volume 2. Istanbul: Research Center for Islamic History, Art and Culture. pp. 239–. ISBN 92-9063-052-3.
