= Beit Jinn =

Town in Syria

Beit Jinn بيت جن
- Village
- Location within Syria
- Coordinates: 33°18′38″N 35°55′8″E
- Country: Syria
- Governorate: Rif Dimashq
- District: Qatana
- Subdistrict: Beit Jinn

Population (2004 census)
  - Total: 2,846
- Time zone: UTC+2 (EET)
  - Summer (DST): UTC+3 (EEST)
- Area code: 11

Beit Jinn (Arabic: بيت جن), also known as Bayt Jin, Beit Jann or Beyt Jene, is a village in southern Syria, administratively part of the Rif Dimashq Governorate, located southwest of Damascus on the foothills of Mount Hermon. According to the Syria Central Bureau of Statistics, Beit Jinn had a population of 2,846 at the 2004 census. Its inhabitants are predominantly Sunni.

The village is the administrative center of the Beit Jinn subdistrict, which consists of nine villages, with a combined population of 15,668. The subdistrict has Sunni population and contains a Druze religious shrine. Nearby localities include Arnah to the north, Darbal to the northeast, Mazraat Beit Jinn to the east, Harfa to the southeast, and Hader to the southwest. The Nahr al-Awaj river (generally identified with the biblical Pharpar) passes near the town.

== History ==
Beit Jinn was visited by Andalusian geographer Ibn Jubayr in the late 12th century, during Ayyubid rule. He noted that it was "a village between Darayyah and Baniyas lying among the hills."

In 1838, during Ottoman rule, Eli Smith noted Beit Jinn's population as being predominantly Sunni Muslim.

=== 2017 Beit Jinn offensive ===
In December 2017, according to the Syrian Observatory for Human Rights, control of the village was a source of fighting between the Syrian Arab Armed Forces and the al-Qaeda-affiliated Levant Liberation Committee. Following the Beit Jinn offensive of late 2017, the Syrian government took control of the area. The local rebels surrendered and were allowed to leave.

== Bibliography ==
- Le Strange, G. (1890). Palestine Under the Moslems: A Description of Syria and the Holy Land from A.D. 650 to 1500. Committee of the Palestine Exploration Fund.
- Robinson, E.; Smith, E. (1841). Biblical Researches in Palestine, Mount Sinai and Arabia Petraea: A Journal of Travels in the year 1838. Vol. 3. Boston: Crocker & Brewster.
