= International Open Film Festival =

International Open Film Festival (IOFF) is an independent film festival based in the United States, owned by an organization in the United States, and open to filmmakers globally.

== Background ==
IOFF was established with the aim to promote local and international talent. The film festival holds an annual contest where they accept films from several different categories, such as educational films, feature films, films about women, Bengali films, and more. In total, the film festival has listed 32 film categories and has received more than 4,000 submissions from 105 countries.

IOFF developed the Independent Film Collaborative (IFC) program to produce an international feature film directed by filmmakers from different countries. Moreover, they are going to establish a Film Market, Co-production Market, Work-in-progress Lab, Script-writing Lab, 48-hour Film-making Project, Film-making Grant etc.

== Selection Process ==
The film festival selects 338 jury members representing different countries. The jury members and online audiences score the film. The film festival recruits scriptwriters, filmmakers, critics, and producers with experience in producing, directing, and judging contemporary films. The results of the film competition are calculated and based on the scores given by jury members, selected audience members, and special jury members.

== Special Recognition ==
- World record holder for recruiting 338 jury members from 105 countries in an international film festival.
- World record holder for awarding the highest number of awards in an international film festival.
- World record holder for having over 4,000 scripts and films from 105 countries enter the competition in its first year.
- World record holder for awarding 103 “The Country Best Award” to 105 countries.
- Earned acclaim from international outlets as one of the most prestigious film festivals in the world.
- Earned acclaim from global filmmakers as one of the most prestigious film festivals in the world.
- Earned acclaim by international film festival circuits for their implementation of a unique strategy of openly communicating with international filmmakers from 24 hours.
- FilmFreeway, a company based in Canada, included IOFF in their list of the 100 best-reviewed film festivals in a survey.

== Events ==
IOFF provides screenings, workshops, lectures, discussions, and industry support to participants.

== Film Categories ==
- Bengali Films
- Young Filmmaker
- Women Filmmaker
- Treatment/ Synopsis
- Television (Program)
- Television (Pilot)
- South Asian Film
- Short Film (Work-In-Progress)
- Short Film (Student)
- Short Film
- Short Documentary
- Screenplay (Short)
- Screenplay (Feature)
- Out of Competition
- Music Video
- Movie Trailer
- Film on Women
- Film on Religion
- Film on Nature/Environment/ Wildlife
- Film on Human Rights
- Film on Disability Issues
- Film Made By Kids
- Feature Film (Work-In-Progress)
- Feature Film (Student)
- Feature Film
- Experimental Film
- Educational Film
- Documentary Feature Film
- Debut Short Film
- Debut Feature Film
- Commercial/TVC
- Children Films
- Animation Film

== Awards ==
- Best Film of the Fest
- Best Award
- Jury Award
- Special Mention Award
- Award of Recognition
- Country Best Award
- Achievement Award
- Official Selection/ Finalist Award
- International Jury Award
- Semi-Finalist Award
