= Beitima =

Beitima بيتيما، بيت تيما Beit Tima, Bayt Tima
- Village
- Location in Syria
- Coordinates: 33°22′0″N 36°0′0″E
- Country: Syria
- Governorate: Rif Dimashq
- District: Qatana
- Subdistrict: Sa'sa'

Population (2004 census)
  - Total: 3,366
- Time zone: UTC+2 (EET)
  - Summer (DST): UTC+3 (EEST)

Beitima or Beit Tima (Arabic: بيتيما) is a Syrian village in the Qatana District of the Rif Dimashq Governorate. According to the Syria Central Bureau of Statistics (CBS), Beitima had a population of 3,366 in the 2004 census. Its inhabitants are predominantly Sunni Muslims.

== History ==
In 1838, Eli Smith noted Beitima's population as Sunni Muslim.

During the Syrian Civil War, the village was the site of several prominent clashes between pro and anti-regime forces. It was described as being a predominantly Druze village by this point.

== Bibliography ==
- Robinson, E.; Smith, E. (1841). Biblical Researches in Palestine, Mount Sinai and Arabia Petraea: A Journal of Travels in the year 1838. Vol. 3. Boston: Crocker & Brewster.
