= Awaj =

Royal proclamation in Ethiopian history

An awaj (Amharic: አዋጅ; also awag) was a formal royal proclamation or edict used in traditional Ethiopian political and legal practice. The word derives from the Geʽez root meaning "to go around" or "to circulate," reflecting the manner in which the proclamation was delivered. A herald known as an awag nägari would travel between villages and public gathering places, reciting the proclamation from a raised position while accompanied by a large nägarit drum and a sändäq stick as symbols of authority. The drums or émbilta flutes were used to draw the attention of the people.

== Background ==
An awaj had to be brief, clear, and easy to memorize. It used colloquial language, was rhymed, and was composed from standard formulae. The Encyclopaedia Aethiopica identifies at least five types of awaj according to their subject matter, covering succession, restitution or confirmation, military mobilisation, and religious doctrine.

The most historically significant use of the awaj was as a military mobilisation order. In September 1895, Emperor Menelik II issued an awaj calling the entire Ethiopian population to arms against the Italian invasion, producing the army that defeated Italy at the Battle of Adwa on 1 March 1896.
