= Awaj River =

River in Syria

Coordinates: 33°22′07.5″N 35°51′35.4″E

The Awaj (Arabic: نهر الأعوج Nahr al-A‘waj, literally 'crooked') is a river in Syria. It rises on the eastern slopes of Mount Hermon near Arnah, flows east for 70 km (43 mi) to the south of Damascus and terminates in the Buhairat al-Hijanah.

The Awaj is usually identified as the Biblical Pharpar, mentioned in the Book of Kings.

== See also ==
- Water resources management in Greater Damascus
