= Qatana =

Qatana قَطَنَا
- City
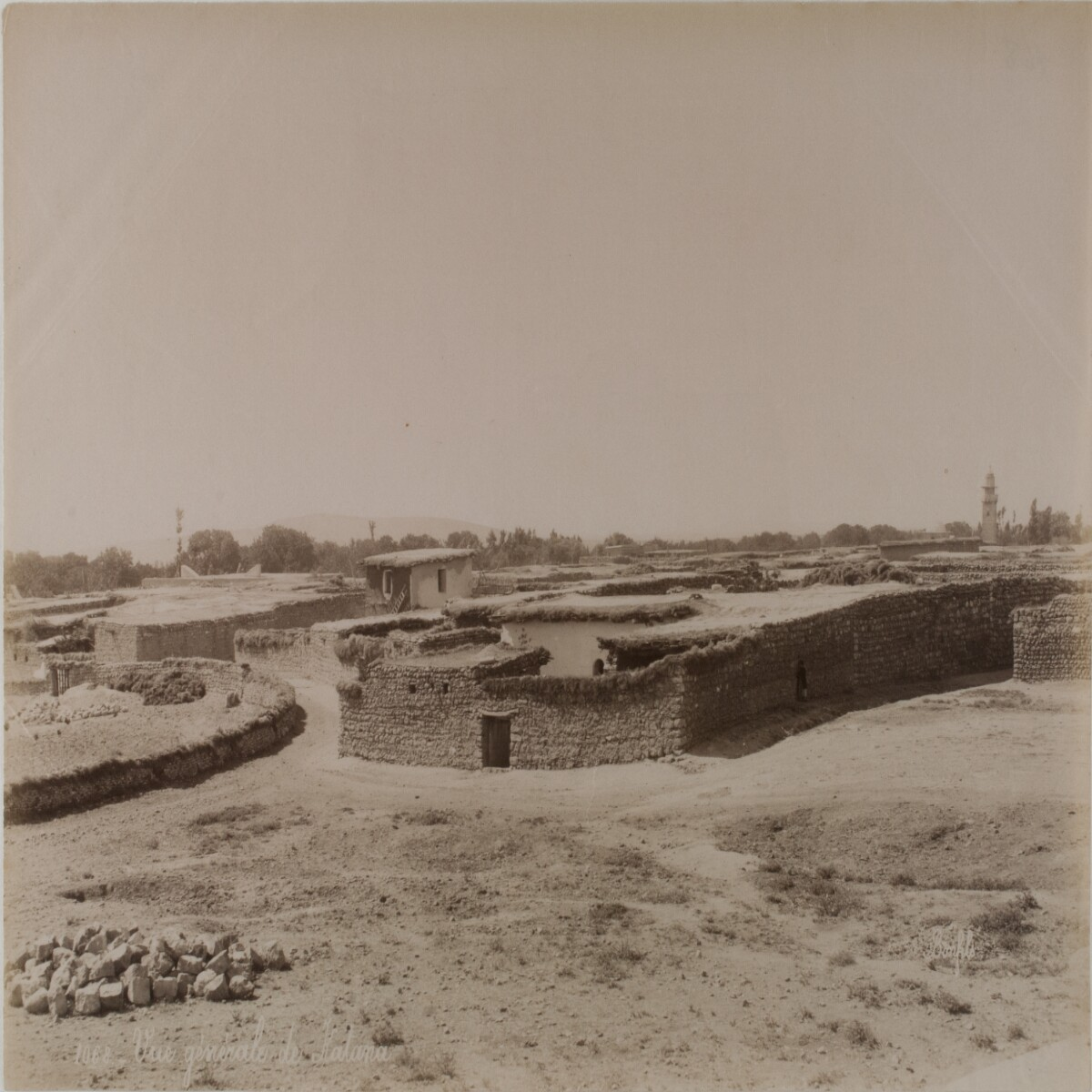
- General view of Qatana, 1867–1914 (late Ottoman period)

- Location in Syria
- Coordinates: 33°25′54″N 36°5′33″E
- Country: Syria
- Governorate: Rif Dimashq
- District: Qatana
- Subdistrict: Qatana
- Settled: c. 880
- Elevation: 879 m (2,884 ft)

Population (2004 census)
  - Total: 33,996

Qatana (Arabic: قَطَنَا, romanized: Qaţanā) is a city in southern Syria, administratively part of the Qatana District of Rif Dimashq Governorate. Qatana has an altitude of 879 meters. According to the Syria Central Bureau of Statistics, the city had a population of 33,996 in the 2004 census. It is the administrative center of the Qatana Subdistrict, which contained 19 localities with a collective population of 147,451 in 2004. The population reflects Syria's general religious diversity, and is made up primarily of Sunni Muslims, with minorities of Greek Orthodox Christians, Assyrians (mostly Syriac Catholics), Druze and Alawites.

== History ==
In the early 13th century, during Ayyubid rule, Yaqut al-Hamawi noted Katana as "one of the villages of Damascus". Tamerlane camped at Qatana during the siege of Damascus in 1400–1401; hence, the region was called as "Wadi al-Ajam" afterwards.

In 1838, Eli Smith noted Katana as being located in the Wady el-'Ajam, and being populated by Sunni Muslims.

In October 1947, the Syrian army began using Qatana as a training camp in preparation for a conflict in Palestine.

Syrian sources relayed to Reuters that on 10 December 2024 following the swift offensive attack and government takeover by Hayat Tahrir Al Sham, Israeli forces entered the demilitarized zone and later reached the town, 10 kilometres (6.2 mi) inside Syria and 25 kilometres (16 mi) from Damascus. The claim was denied by Israeli Defense Minister Israel Katz.

== Geography ==
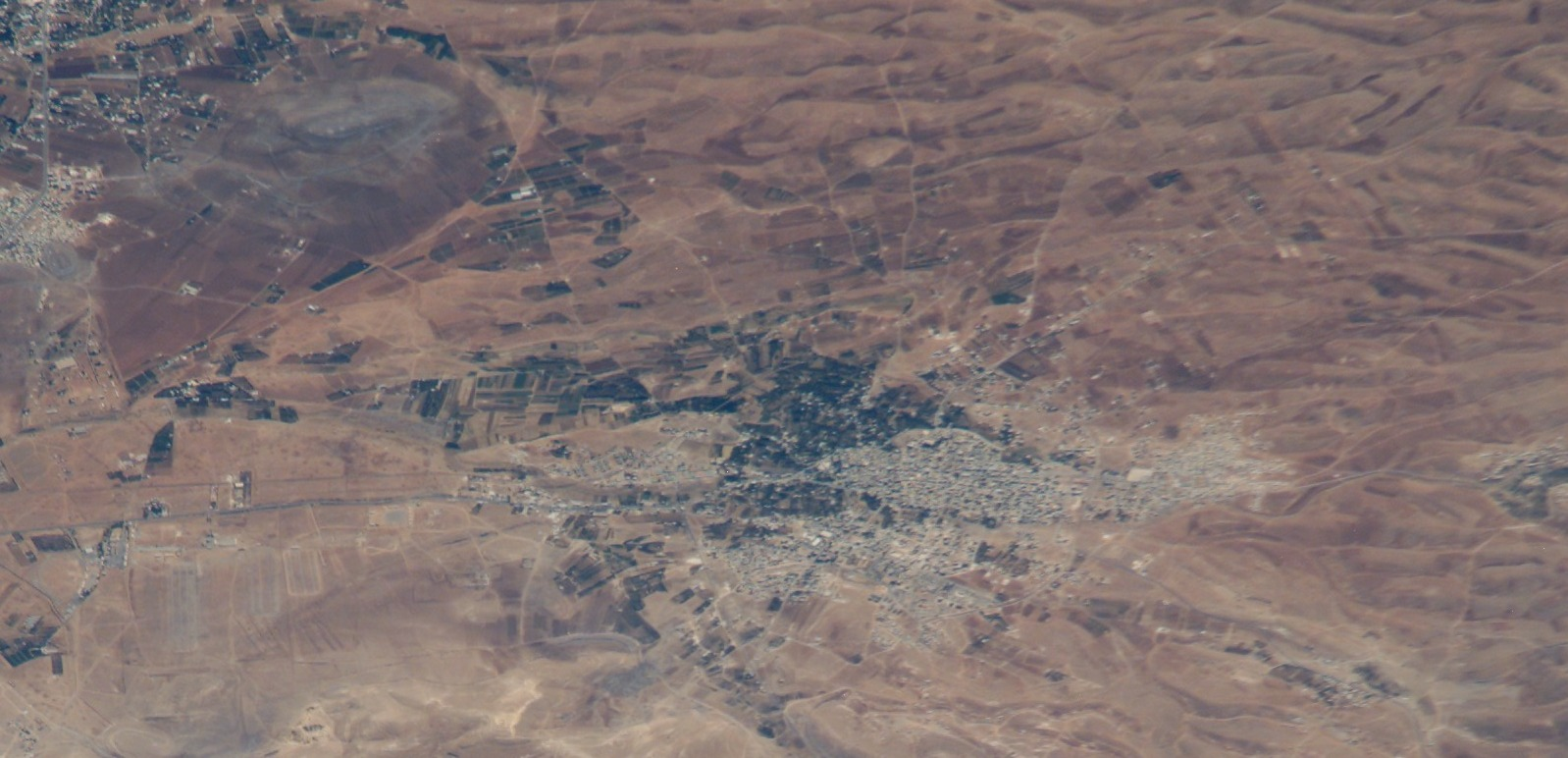
Qatana

=== Climate ===
Qatana has a cold semi-arid climate (Köppen climate classification: BSk). Rainfall is higher in winter than in summer. The average annual temperature in Qatana is 16.1 °C (61.0 °F). About 296 mm (11.65 in) of precipitation falls annually.

Climate data for Qatana
Month	Jan	Feb	Mar	Apr	May	Jun	Jul	Aug	Sep	Oct	Nov	Dec	Year
Mean daily maximum °C (°F)	10.9 (51.6)	12.6 (54.7)	16.1 (61.0)	20.9 (69.6)	26.5 (79.7)	30.9 (87.6)	32.8 (91.0)	33.5 (92.3)	30.2 (86.4)	25.8 (78.4)	19.0 (66.2)	13.3 (55.9)	22.7 (72.9)
Mean daily minimum °C (°F)	2.0 (35.6)	2.6 (36.7)	4.8 (40.6)	8.0 (46.4)	11.6 (52.9)	14.9 (58.8)	16.5 (61.7)	16.8 (62.2)	14.4 (57.9)	11.4 (52.5)	7.2 (45.0)	3.9 (39.0)	9.5 (49.1)
Average precipitation mm (inches)	73 (2.9)	55 (2.2)	33 (1.3)	16 (0.6)	11 (0.4)	0 (0)	0 (0)	0 (0)	0 (0)	11 (0.4)	35 (1.4)	62 (2.4)	296 (11.7)
Source: Climate-Data.org, Climate data

== Religious buildings ==
There are at least nine mosques and three churches distributed throughout the city:

- Al-Omari Mosque with its wooden minaret.
- Sheikh Hassan Al-Rai Mosque.
- Al-Ghalaini Mosque
- Sadat Mosque
- Al-Qadri Mosque
- Maryam bint Imran Mosque
- Omar Mosque
- Al-Rahman Mosque
- Hibatullah Mosque
- St. Elias of the Greek Orthodox Church
- Our Lady of Deliverance of the Syriac Catholic Church
- Jesus of Nazareth Evangelical Church

== See also ==
- Christianity in Syria
- Druze in Syria
- Alawites in Syria

== Bibliography ==
- Ibn Khaldun (1952). Ibn Khaldūn and Tamerlane: Their Historic Meeting in Damascus, 1401 A.d. (803 A. H.) A Study Based on Arabic Manuscripts of Ibn Khaldūn's "Autobiography,". Translated by Walter Joseph Fischel. University of California Press.
- Le Strange, G. (1890). Palestine Under the Moslems: A Description of Syria and the Holy Land from A.D. 650 to 1500. London: Committee of the Palestine Exploration Fund. OCLC 1004386.
- Robinson, E.; Smith, E. (1841). Biblical Researches in Palestine, Mount Sinai and Arabia Petraea: A Journal of Travels in the year 1838. Vol. 3. Boston: Crocker & Brewster.
