= Golan Regiment =

Syrian loyalist militia

- فوج الجولان; Fouj al-Joulan
- The Golan Regiment generally uses the Ba'athist flag of Syria as logo.
- Leaders: Majid Himoud † (chief commander until 2017); Khaled Abaza (chief commander from 2017)
- Dates active: 2011–2014 (as rebel group); 2014–2019 (as pro-government unit)
- Allegiance: (Syria) Syrian Arab Republic: Syrian Ba'ath Party
- Groups: Fist Battalion (part of "National Shield of the Patriotic Forces" from 2017); Second Battalion; Third Battalion
- Headquarters: Khan Arnabah
- Active regions: Syria
- Ideology: Anti-Zionism; Pro-Syrian government Druze interests
- Part of: National Defence Forces
- Wars: the Syrian civil war

The Golan Regiment (Arabic: فوج الجولان, Fouj al-Joulan) was a Syrian militia based in Khan Arnabah that was part of the National Defence Forces (NDF). Though primarily active in the Golan Heights, the unit has been deployed in various warzones of western Syria, fighting against many different Syrian opposition forces and the Islamic State of Iraq and the Levant. The Golan Regiment was notable insofar as it was the first government unit during the Syrian civil war that was founded by Free Syrian Army (FSA) defectors.

== History ==
=== Rebellion and return to the government side ===
The al-Mutasim Battalion announces its formation, declaring that it intends to defend the "great revolution" against the "corrupt" Assad government and its "thugs" and "mercenaries".

The beginnings of the Golan Regiment trace back to 2011, when its later leader Majid Himoud volunteered for the Syrian Army. According to Himoud, the officers in his division abused him and other soldiers, whereupon they decided to defect. In December 2011, they formed a Free Syrian Army unit under Himoud's leadership, the al-Mutasim Battalion, and began to fight against the government near the border with Israel. Allied with other local rebel groups, Himoud's men fought at Jabata, Khan Arnabah, Madinat al-Baath (today Madinat al-Salam Beer Ajam, and Breika, and made good progress against the government. As time went on, however, Himoud became increasingly dissatisfied with his allies; he later claimed that some groups such as Alwiya al-Furqan "wouldn’t even fight, they would come to the battlefield after the clashes had ended, take pictures and videos next to destroyed buildings and tanks, and then send them back to their financiers in Jordan or the Gulf states in order to collect their paychecks". Others he accused of closely working with Israel, which he considered a "red line" Syrians should not cross. (Note: When asked about Himoud's claims, the Southern Front denied working with Israel, and said that "[Himoud] is an opportunist and a liar. He is a traitor and a regime agent.")

These factors led Himoud and many of his men to reconsider their role as rebels, and in late 2013 he eventually contacted the mayor of Khan Arnabah, who was his relative and the NDF commander whose troops he was primarily fighting. The two agreed to a local ceasefire, and after eight months of negotiations, Himoud and dozens of his fighters handed themselves over to the government. They received an amnesty by president Bashar al-Assad, and formed the "Golan Regiment" as National Defence Forces unit/Popular Committee, centered in Khan Arnabah. The al-Mutasim Battalion members who disagreed with Himoud's decision and refused to defect instead joined other rebel groups. Since its foundation, the Golan Regiment has grown by recruiting government loyalists into its ranks, for example from Hader, a mostly Druze town that is generally considered to be staunchly pro-Assad.

=== As NDF unit ===
==== Fighting in northern Quneitra 2015–16 ====
In course of the Quneitra offensive in June 2015, the Golan Regiment and the Quneitra Hawks Brigade first held two strategic significant hills against numerous rebel assaults, and then aided the Syrian Army in retaking Tal Hamr and lifting the siege of Hader. They consequently helped to fend off further attacks against Hader by the Southern Front and allied mujahideen. Throughout July, the Golan Regiment helped to defend several towns and hills in the Golan Heights against various Southern Front-led attacks, and participated in a major government counter-offensive in the area.

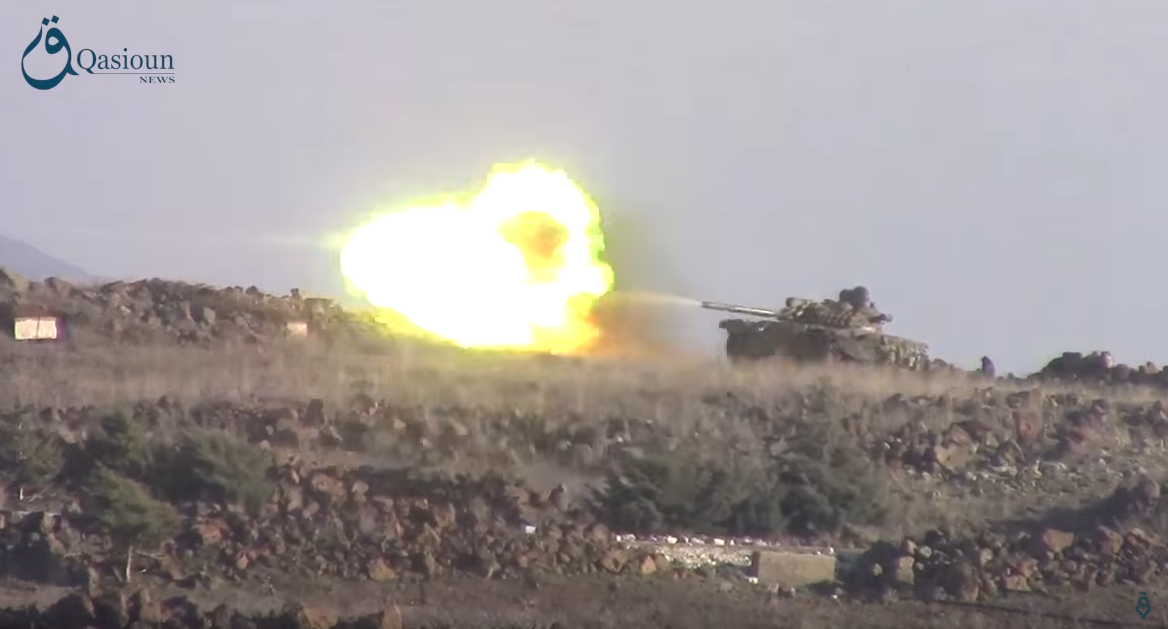
A rebel T-72 shoots at the government positions on Tal Kroum, which were held by the Golan Regiment at the time.

In September 2015, the regiment held reconciliation talks with Free Syrian Army (FSA) units that held Jabatha Al-Khasheb, Beit Jinn, and Taranjah, though in the end the talks failed and fighting was resumed. As result, FSA and al-Nusra Front fighters launched another offensive to capture Hader and the surrounding countryside, with the Golan Regiment once again attempting to hold its positions at the frontline.

On 2 October, the Islamist Jaish al-Haramoun alliance and several FSA units launched another offensive in Quneitra, first attacking Tall Ahmar, which was defended by the Golan Regiment and the Quneitra Hawks Brigade. After a fierce, two-days long battle, the hill fell into rebel hands and the NDF defenders were forced to withdraw. The Golan Regiment, along with other NDF and army units, launched a counter-attack to recapture Tall Ahmar on 7 October, which was repelled. Opposition troops then also took control of the nearby "UN hill", though NDF forces, including the Golan Regiment, reversed this rebel gain a few hours later. In course of the next weeks, the Golan Regiment helped to recapture all positions taken by rebel forces during the offensive.

In late December 2015, the Golan Regiment participated in a government attack on West Al-Samdaniyah, which was captured after hard fighting; soon after its capture, however, the army retreated from the town for unknown reasons, so that it was retaken by rebels.

The regiment and other government units once again held reconciliation talks with local FSA rebels in the following January 2016. Later that month, the 9th Armoured Division's 90th Brigade and the Golan Regiment successfully ambushed an al-Nusra Front and Ahrar al-Sham convoy near the Shebaa farms. On 29 January, the Golan Regiment helped to repel renewed rebel attacks against the contested hill of Tal Kroum.

==== Expanded operations 2016–17 ====
Beginning with February 2016, when the unit sent its fighters north to participate in the first government offensive to retake ISIL-held Al-Tabqa Military Airport, the Golan Regiment became far more active outside of Quneitra Governorate. Though the aforementioned offensive eventually stalled and was discontinued, the Golan Regiment also aided the recapture of Palmyra from ISIL in March. Later in June, its militiamen were once again involved in another attempt by the government to regain Al-Tabqa Military Airport; which ended in a complete defeat as the pro-government forces were routed by ISIL counter-attacks.

Meanwhile, the Golan Regiment continued its defence of the Hader area. On 6 June the Criterion Brigades launched an offensive called "At Your Service Darayya" in order to draw government forces from the Siege of Darayya and Muadamiyat to reinforce the front in Quneitra. The Brigades allegedly seized 2 villages, which was promptly denied by the Golan Regiment. On 28 July, the Israel Defense Forces attacked the Golan Regiment, launching missiles at the convoy of Majid Himoud and two mortar emplacements of the unit at Madinat al-Baath. While Himoud survived, the militia denounced Israel for its "Zionist" attacks.

We are good at what we do and the army relies on us to stop the opposition from penetrating the front lines in Quneitra, precisely because some of our groups used to be with the opposition groups. Majid [Himoud] and the others know who they are personally, know how they think and how they fight. This helps our fight against them.

— Mohammad Zeidan, Golan Regiment fighter since 2014.

The following September saw a resurgence in the fighting for the Golan Heights, as Jihadist-led rebels launched a large-scale offensive in the area, with the Golan Regiment once again at the forefront in the defense of Hader. Throughout the battle, the Golan Regiment accused Israel of supporting the Islamist rebels, and on 17 September, the unit once again became the target of an Israeli Air Force (IAF) strike that killed one and wounded 5 of its militiamen. The strike was in retaliation for a stray mortar shell that had hit Israeli territory. On the other side, the pro-opposition Al-Etihad accused the Golan Regiment of having disguised Hezbollah fighters in its ranks. While the rebel offensive was eventually repelled, a later government counter-offensive supported by the Golan Regiment equally yielded no gains. Meanwhile, after the Syrian Revolutionaries Front (SRF)'s branch in Jubata al-Khashab collapsed amid internal discord, the local SRF commander defected to the Golan Regiment.

The unit spearheaded a government attack in November 2016 that secured the northern part of a strategic highway in the Golan Heights. In December, the Golan Regiment sent reinforcements to the Tiyas Military Airbase in an attempt to halt a massive ISIL offensive in the region. On 17 and 26 January 2017, the regiment reportedly helped to repel two rebel attacks in the areas around Hader. On 19 March, the Israeli Air Force targeted the Golan Regiment commander Yasser Hussein al-Sayyed (Note: Al-Sayyed's position within the regiment is disputed. He has been described as commander by news agencies, while the unit's leadership insists that he was "a fighter with no particular rank".) with a drone as he was travelling to Damascus by car. Both he and his driver were killed. The attack was seen as Israeli retaliation for the attempt of the Syrian Air Defense Force to shoot down an IAF jet that had bombarded Hezbollah positions near Palmyra. Meanwhile, the unit also helped countering rebel offensives in Jobar and northern Hama, and took part in the operations in the Syrian Desert in course of which the government again retook Palmyra and pushed back ISIL in eastern Homs Governorate.

On 16 June, a suicide bomber struck Majid Himoud as he was meeting with other Golan Regiment fighters in Khan Arnabah; two members of the unit were killed instantly, while Himoud was wounded and brought to a hospital. There he succumbed to his wounds two days later. He was replaced by Khaled Abaza as chief commander of the militia, while Yassin Salibi became the new head of the Golan Regiment's First Battalion. Later that month, the Golan Regiment aided the Syrian Army and other pro-government militias in repelling a major rebel offensive against Madinat al-Baath; in course of the fighting, the unit was once again bombed by the Israeli Air Force. The Golan Regiment helped to repel a Tahrir al-Sham-led attack on Hader in September 2017. In late 2017, the Golan Regiment relocated much of its forces from other regions of Syria to the Golan Heights in response to rumors about another rebel offensive.

Meanwhile, disputes erupted among the Golan Regiment's leadership. After becoming the new leader of the militia, Khaled Abaza had grown increasingly powerful, having been appointed as head of Ba'ath Party's branch in Quneitra Governorate and effectively taking control of Khan Arnabah. He eventually tried to oust Yassin Salibi as leader of the First Battalion, but Yassin found the support of the Quneitra Hawks Brigade and the al-Bustan Association of pro-government businessman Rami Makhlouf, both of which were wary of Kaled's power. In consequence, the Golan Regiment's Fist Battalion and the Quneitra Hawks Brigade forces in Khan Arnabah, supported by the al-Bustan Association, merged to form the "National Shield of the Patriotic Forces" in December 2017. This new formation was about 1,500 strong and to be led by Mohammed al-Hajj. This development reduced Khaled's control to the Golan Regiment's Second and Third Battalion. The "National Shield" then took part in the Beit Jinn offensive. In March 2018, the Golan Regiment and the Quneitra Hawks Brigade occupied Point 99, a hill west of Beit Jinn, as result of the agreement between the government and rebel forces following the Beit Jinn offensive's conclusion.

Artillery fire again struck Israeli territory during renewed clashes in Quneitra Governorate in July 2018, whereupon the Israeli military responded by bombarding areas in Al-A'ayyaz near Khan Arnabah that were controlled by the Golan Regiment.

== Organization ==
The Golan Regiment is split into three parts: The "First Battalion" of Khan Arnabah, the "Second Battalion" of Hader, and the "Third Battalion" of Jaba. The founder of the militia, Majid Himoud, served as both chief commander and leader of the First Battalion before his death in June 2017. Thereafter, the militia's overall leader was Khaled Abaza, a Circassian from Beer Ajam and the son of Brigadier Walid Abaza who served as head of the Political Security Directorate's branch in Hama during the Islamist uprising in Syria. By late 2017, the battalions were led by Yassin Salibi (First), Abu Mashhour (Second), and Abu Suhaib (Third). Another notable officer in the Golan Regiment was Yasser Hussein al-Sayyed.

== See also ==
- Belligerents in the Syrian civil war

== Bibliography ==
- Smith, Martin; Hirsch, Linda (27 October 2015). "Inside Assad's Syria". Frontline. Season 33. Episode 18. PBS. Transcript.
