= Quneitra offensive (June 2015) =

Military operation

- Part of the Syrian Civil War
- Map showing territorial changes during the course of the 2015 Quneitra Offensive. Map covers the entirety of Quneitra Governorate, with the main area of fighting delimited with a box with a broken black line border.
Date	16–26 June 2015 (1 week and 3 days)
Location	Quneitra Governorate, Syria
Result	Indecisive; Minimal rebel gains

Belligerents
Free Syrian Army Jaish al-Haramoun: Al-Nusra Front; Ahrar ash-Sham; Tahaluf Fatah al-Sham; Liwa al-Jihad; Tajamu al-Mujahideen Nawa; Liwa Ansar al-Haq; Liwa al-Umawayn al-Islami; Liwa Fursan al-Sunna; Harakat Shuhada al-Sham	(Syria) Syrian Arab Republic: Syrian Armed Forces; National Defense Force; Golan Regiment

Commanders and leaders
Khaled al-Nabulsi	Unknown

Units involved
Free Syrian Army: Southern Front; First Army	Golan Regiment; Liwa Suqour al-Quneitra; 9th Division

Strength
4,000+	Unknown

Casualties and losses
15 killed (SOHR claim); 37 killed (18–19 June; Army claim)	27 killed

The Quneitra offensive (June 2015) was launched by Syrian rebel forces, during the Syrian Civil War, in order to capture the last government-held positions in Quneitra Governorate: Hader, Madinat al-Baath, Khan Arnabah and the strategic hill of Tell Krum. The other objective was connecting southern rebel-held parts of Syria with Western Ghouta.

== The offensive ==
The offensive was launched on 16 June 2015. It was unclear who started the operation, with some reports saying it was the Southern Front of the Free Syrian Army, while others that it was a newly formed coalition called Jaish al-Haramoun, which was established by the al-Qaeda-linked al-Nusra Front. According to the Southern Front, it specifically forbade the participation of al-Nusra, with a spokesman stating it does "not share the vision for a free Syria we are fighting for".

The next day, the rebels surrounded the Druze town of Hadar, after they seized the Tuloul al-Hamar area, including the strategic Tal Hamr hill north of the town. Also, the rebels launched simultaneous attacks targeting Tal Shaar, Tal al Bazzaq and the town of Jaba. The attacks were repelled by Syrian armed forces.

On 19 June, the SOHR reported that rebels had captured a large quantity of ammunition and weapons during ongoing clashes in the Tuloul al-Hamar area, while local government reinforcements were deployed to aid the besieged Druze militia in Hader. Later that day, the Syrian Army's 9th Division recaptured Tal Hamr hill, making Hader no longer besieged. In response to the Army counter-attack, rebels brought in new reinforcements.

On 20 June, the 'Army of Conquest in the southern region' was established and immediately took part in the campaign in Quneitra, while the FSA announced the battle for the 160th Battalion, Infantry Battalion and Military Police barrier in Quneitra. The next day, FSA's First Army announced that it would not cooperate with the Army of Conquest.

As of 23 June, fighting continued at the towns of Beit Jinn, Jabatha Al-Khashab and Ufaniya, while the rebels once again seized several positions in the Tuloul al-Hamar area, with the Army making attempts to regain them over the following several days.

On 25 June, opposition activists claimed fighting took place in Jaba village, located along the primary supply line for the government forces stationed in some of the villages and hills north of Quneitra. The rebels also claimed they were in the process of opening the way to Beit Jinn, in an attempt to trap several military brigades in the surrounding al-Hamar highlands, and cut the supply lines of government forces to Quneitra. They also claimed to have seized heat-seeking anti-aircraft Cobra rockets from military installations in the al-Hamar highlands.

== Reaction ==
- Israel – Israel, which has a large Druze population has been watching the offensive closely. The BBC reported that "thousands of Druze protested in villages across Israel, calling on the government and international community to come to the aid of their brethren in Syria". The Israeli government has stated that it will not send troops to Druze areas of Syria, though the government did lobby the United States for increased aid to the Druze populations on the Syrian side of the border. However, Gadi Eizenkot, Chief of Staff of the Israeli Defense Force has stated that the "IDF will do everything it can to prevent a massacre of Syrian refugees who have taken refuge near the border with Israel".
- Lebanon - Reactions among Druze politicians in Lebanon varied, though all expressed concern for Druze populations in Syria. Walid Jumblatt, leader of the predominantly Druze Progressive Socialist Party, "called on Syrian Druze to support the rebellion in their country, arguing that the real threat to them came from a government that killed dozens of people every day". Alternatively, Wiam Wahhab of the Lebanese Unification Movement, a supporter of Bashar al-Assad, disagreed with Jumblatt's suggestion and instead "appealed for "money, volunteers, weapons" to help those in Suweida defend themselves".

== Aftermath ==
In late July 2015, it was reported that the Syrian Armed Forces targeted the rebel contingents at the towns of Jabatha Al-Khashab, Turnajah, Al-Hamidiyah, Al-Samadaniyah Al-Sharqiyah, and Al-Ajraf.

On 25 August 2015, it was reported that the rebels had control of the Tuloul al-Hamar, from which they sniped cars travelling on the three-kilometer dirt road between the government-held towns of Hader and Harfa.

In late August and early September, rebel attacks on Madinat al-Baath and Khan Arnabah from Samadaniyah al-Gharbi-Al-Hamidiyah axis and Al-Huriyah-Ufaniyah axis were repelled.

On 27 September 2015, it was reported that Israeli rockets had struck Syrian army positions in Brigade 90, Nabi' al-Fawwar and Tel ash Shahm army base.

== See also ==
- 2014 Quneitra offensive
- Quneitra Governorate clashes (2012–14)
- Battle of Bosra (2015)
- Battle of Nasib Border Crossing (April 2015)
