= Quneitra offensive (September 2016) =

2016 Syrian Civil War offensive

- Part of the Syrian Civil War
- The military situation in Quineitra Governorate in 2016 - scene of fighting marked with black box. Syrian Ba'athist Army control Syrian Opposition control Islamic State of Iraq and the Levant Ongoing confrontation or unclear situation
Date	10–17 September 2016 (1 week)
Location	Quneitra Governorate, Syrian territories (de jure Syrian Arab Republic)
Status	Indecisive: Rebels captured two hills and several checkpoints; The Army recaptures all lost territory, except Tal Al-Hamirat hill

Belligerents
(Syrian opposition) Free Syrian Army; Ahrar al-Sham; Jabhat Fateh al-Sham (Islamic State) Bayt al-Maqdis; Sadqa Wa'dah Movement	(Syria) Syrian Arab Republic; SSNP; Jaysh al-Muwahhideen; Men of Dignity; Kata'ib Humat al-Diyar; Hezbollah

Commanders and leaders
Abu Suhaib Al Tunisi † (Jabhat Fateh al-Sham commander); Mohammad Yusuf al-Sabihi † (Jabhat Fateh al-Sham commander); Amjad Abdul Hakim al-Balkhi † (Jabhat Fateh al-Sham commander); Abu al-Mossana al-Shami † (Ahrar al-Sham senior commander); Baslan Fou'az Al-Masri † (Sadqa Wa'dah Movement chief commander)	Brig. Gen. Osama Zahreddine (Operations chief commander); Majid Himoud (Golan Regiment’s Fist Battalion commander)

Units involved
(Syrian opposition) Free Syrian Army; Alwiya al-Furqan	Syrian Armed Forces; Syrian Army; 5th Armoured Division; 7th Infantry Division; 9th Armoured Division; 90th Brigade; National Defence Forces; Golan Regiment; Quneitra Hawks Brigade; As-Suwayda NDF volunteers

Casualties and losses
28 killed (per the SOHR); 54 killed (per The Inside Source); 70+ killed (per the Army)	9 killed (per the SOHR); Dozens killed (per The Inside Source)

The Quneitra offensive (September 2016) was launched by Syrian rebel forces, during the Syrian Civil War, in order to capture the government-held town of Hader, Quneitra Governorate.

== The offensive ==
On 10 September, Jabhat Fateh al-Sham (formerly the al-Nusra Front), along with Ansar Bait al-Maqdis and Ahrar al-Sham, launched an offensive at the town of Khan Arnabah on the border with the Golan Heights. Hours later, the rebels took one checkpoint and a hill, but according to pro-government sources, failed to capture another hill and were repelled by pro-government forces.

Meanwhile, the fighting caused stray shells to land at the northern Golan Heights and in response, Israel bombed a Syrian Army artillery position in Quneitra.

The next day, the rebels made advances at the village of Homirat, seizing a large part of its eastern flank, mainly Tal Al-Hamirat hill. At the same time, the main rebel attack towards Hader, at the Tal Taranjeh hilltop, was repelled after a three-hour battle. Rebel forces also reportedly suffered heavy losses after entering a minefield near Tal Gren hill. This included the destruction of two BMP infantry fighting vehicles.

On 12 September, the Army reportedly recaptured all positions they had previously lost, including Tal Al-Hamirat. Later in the day, despite the official start of a country-wide cease-fire, the rebels launched a new, much larger, assault. The rebels once again assaulted Tal Taranjeh hill, but were again beaten back after 10 hours of fighting.

The next day, the Syrian Air Defense Force launched two surface to air missiles at two Israeli Air Force aircraft flying over Quneitra. The Syrian state media Syrian Arab News Agency claimed to have shot down the plane and drone, but the IAF denied this.

On 14 September, a new rebel attack on Tal Taranjeh was beaten back by the Syrian Army. Despite the official ceasefire, both sides continued to shell each other during 17 September, with one stray mortar shell hitting Israeli occupied territory. This led the Israeli Air Force to retaliate by striking the Golan Regiment's positions near Hader. Hours later, the rebels launched a new attack on the government-held Battalion 4 Hill, which was repelled. On 20 September, it was revealed that Al-Humriyah hill was recaptured by the rebels and was being bombarded by the army positions in Tuloul al-Hamar.

== Aftermath ==
A new rebel assault on Hader in November was also repelled, with 19–80 rebels and at least 10 soldiers killed.

== See also ==
- Quneitra Governorate clashes (2012–14)
- 2014 Quneitra offensive
- Quneitra offensive (June 2015)
- Quneitra offensive (October 2015)
- 2018 Southern Syria offensive
