= Quneitra offensive (October 2015) =

2015 offensive in the Syrian Civil War

- Part of the Syrian Civil War
- The current military situation in Quineitra Governorate. Scene of fighting marked with black box. Syrian Army control Opposition control Islamic State of Iraq and the Levant Ongoing confrontation or unclear situation
Date	2–24 October 2015 (3 weeks and 1 day)
Location	Quneitra Governorate, Syria
Result	Syrian Army victory: Rebels capture the 4th Battalion base, Tall Ahmar and UN hill; Army recaptures all territory lost

Belligerents
Free Syrian Army: Southern Front; Jaish al-Haramoun: al-Nusra Front; Islamic Front; Christ Brigade	(Syria) Syrian Arab Republic: Syrian Armed Forces; National Defense Force

Commanders and leaders
Khaled al-Nabulsi	Unknown

Units involved
Southern Front: First Army; Army of Conquest: Ahrar ash-Sham; Al-Nusra Front; Tahaluf Fatah al-Sham; Liwa al-Jihad; Tajamu al-Mujahideen Nawa; Liwa Ansar al-Haq; Liwa al-Umawayn al-Islami; Liwa Fursan al-Sunna; Harakat Shuhada al-Sham	Golan Regiment; Liwa Suqour al-Quneitra; 90th Brigade

Casualties and losses
19–47 killed	Unknown

The Quneitra offensive (October 2015) was launched by Syrian rebel forces, during the Syrian Civil War, in order to capture government-held positions in Quneitra Governorate at: Tall Ahmar, UN hill, Madinat al-Baath and Khan Arnabah. The objective was to break the government siege of Western Ghouta.

== The offensive ==
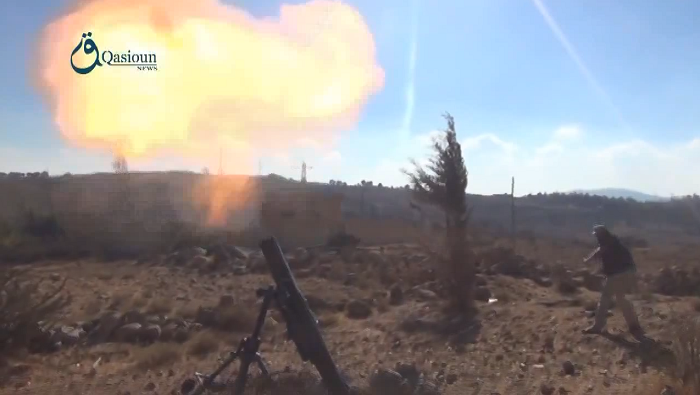
A rebel mortar fires at government positions during the offensive.

On 4 October, rebels of the Free Syrian Army captured Tall Ahmar after two days of fighting. One of the leaders of the operation was killed during the battle. The Army backed by pro-government militia launched a counter-attack on the hill but was repelled.

On 10 October, rebels captured the "UN hill" and resumed their offensive against Tal Qaba’a. The next day, the Army allegedly managed to recapture the hill. Two days later, the military recaptured Tall Ahmar as well, thus reversing all of the rebel's gains. Government forces also advanced in the area of al-Amal farms. That day, the IDF shelled Syrian Army posts after two rockets landed on the Israeli-occupied part of the Golan Heights.

On 24 October, government forces recaptured the 4th Battalion base, reversing all rebel gains since the start of the offensive.

== See also ==
- 2014 Quneitra offensive
- Quneitra Governorate clashes (2012–14)
- Battle of Nasib Border Crossing
- Battle of Bosra (2015)
