= Israeli invasion of Syria =

"Israeli invasion of Syria" may refer to any of the following events in the Arab–Israeli conflict:

- Six-Day War, when fighting between Israel and Syria ended with the former capturing the latter's territory in June 1967
- Israeli invasion of Syria (2024–present), began after the fall of Syria's president Bashar al-Assad during the Syrian civil war
