= Islamic Resistance Front in Syria =

Militant organization in Syria

Islamic Resistance Front in Syria (IRFS)
- جبهة المقاومة الإسلامية في سوريا
- Leader: Abu Mujahid
- Dates active: December 17, 2024 – present
- Country: Syria
- Allegiance: Ba'athist Syria
- Ideology: Anti-Zionism; Islamism; Assadism
- Wars: Syrian civil war; Israeli invasion of Syria

The Islamic Resistance Front in Syria (IRFS; Arabic: جبهة المقاومة الإسلامية في سوريا, romanized: Jabhat al-muqāwamah al-Islāmīyah fī Sūriyā), also known as Brave People - Islamic Resistance Front In Syria (Arabic: الشعب الشجاع - جبهة المقاومة الإسلامية في سوريا, romanized: al-Šaʿb al-Šujāʿ - Jabhat al-muqāwamah al-Islāmīyah fī Sūriyā), as well as Uli al-Baas (Arabic: أولي البأس, romanized: ʾŪlī al-Baʾs, lit. 'Possessors of Might'), previously known as the Southern Liberation Front (Arabic: جبهة تحرير الجنوب, romanized: Jabhat taḥrīr al-Janūb), is a militant organization established in response to the fall of the Assad regime and the ongoing Israeli invasion of Syria.

== History ==
The Islamic Resistance Front in Syria was established on December 17, 2024, as the Southern Liberation Front with the goal of it, according to a statement released by the organization, to protect the Syrian people and push Israel out of Syrian territory, the statement described it as a grassroots Syrian organization established in response to the new Syrian government's silence and inaction regarding Israel, referred to in the statement as “the Israeli enemy” and “the Israeli occupation.” The group is considered supportive of Assad, since its founding party, the SSNP, had been fervent Assad supporters, fighting as a faction considered to be part of the Axis of Resistance, on behalf of the Assad government in the Syrian Civil War.

The commander of IRFS claimed that the group's formation was spurred by the "ongoing attempts at division, starvation, displacement, arrests, and systematic killings" during the Israeli invasion of Syria.

On January 9, the group started calling themselves Tahrir al-Janoub (JTJ), or the Southern Liberation Front (SLF). The group announced their formation on their official Telegram channel where they claimed that their formation is a response against "Israeli occupation’s advance into our lands in southern Syria—specifically in the governorates of Quneitra, Daraa, and the western countryside of Damascus".

The name Southern Liberation Front was changed to the Islamic Resistance Front in Syria on January 11, 2025. According to the group, they changed their name “due to the existence of multiple fronts with the same name”. The group's logo and their declared objectives were also changed.

On March 3, 2025, the Islamic Resistance Front in Syria warned Israeli forces to withdraw from the demilitarized zone in the Golan Heights and Southern Syria threatening action.

In an interview with the Lebanese newspaper an-Nahar on March 27 that the group "is not a transient movement, but rather a fully integrated organization," pointing out the presence of "specialized offices, including political, media, social, and military branches." Additionally, the insider asserted that UAB and the Syrian Popular Resistance troops were no longer in contact: "There was coordination between the two sides in the past." However, we have separated ourselves from this group since the events on the shore on March 6 and the charges made against the Front. Additionally, he asserted that there was no obvious leadership direction for the opposing faction. According to the Washington Institute's Militia Spotlight project, Uli al-Baas announced in July 2025 that it had dissolved its old political office and tasked Tariq Hamad with forming a new political bureau under its general leadership. The same profile stated that on 15 July 2025, the group announced that the military leadership and members of the Syrian Popular Resistance had pledged allegiance to Uli al-Baas and joined the front.

== Combat operations ==
On January 9, 2025, the Southern Liberation Front gave Israel 48 hours to withdraw all Israeli troops from the buffer zone near the Golan Heights. The group claimed a few days later that it was monitoring and preparing to attack the IDF in southern Syria.

On January 26, 2025, The Islamic Resistance Front in Syria claimed responsibility for taking down a drone belonging to the Israel Defense Force in Southern Syria in their first official operation against them.

On January 31, 2025, the group claimed that it had attacked the Israeli military in the village of Taranja, Quneitra. But no evidence of the attack was provided, and the group later denied that the incident had taken place in a post on Telegram.

On February 3, 2025, IDF opened fire on an armed group of men in Golan Heights, no injuries from IDF were reported. On the same day, Syrian media claimed that the armed groups fired at IDF soldiers near the village of Turnejeh, Quneitra. Islamic Resistance Front has claimed responsibility for this attack.

On February 27, 2025, the IRFS began forming military cells in Southern Syria, likely with Iranian backing.

On April 2, 2026, during the spillover of the 2026 Iran war, the IRFS conducted an ambush on Israeli forces in Quneitra, reportedly managing to take down a drone. Israel responded with air strikes and artillery bombardment in the region.
