= Al-Bakkar =

Al-Bakkar البكار الغربي Al-Bakkar al-Gharbi
- Village
- Location within Syria
- Coordinates: 32°52′41″N 35°54′28″E
- PAL: 235/253
- Country: Syria
- Governorate: Daraa
- District: Izraa
- Subdistrict: Tasil

Population (2004)
  - Total: 833
- Time zone: UTC+2 (EET)
  - Summer (DST): UTC+3 (EEST)

Al-Bakkar (Arabic: البكار) is a village in southern Syria, administratively part of the Izraa District in the Daraa Governorate. According to the Syria Central Bureau of Statistics (CBS), al-Bakkar had a population of 833 in the 2004 census. Its inhabitants are predominantly Sunni Muslims.

== History ==
=== Civil War ===
On 28 September 2021, Syrian Army units reinforced their positions in several villages of Daraa's countryside after settlement agreements, including in al-Bakkar, where militants, wanted persons, and deserters handed over weapons and had their status regularized.

During the Israeli invasion in Syria, the vicinity of al-Bakkar village was among the areas affected.

== Religious buildings ==
- Abu Hajar Mosque
