= Hader, Quneitra Governorate =

Druze village in Syria

Hader حضر Hadar
- Town
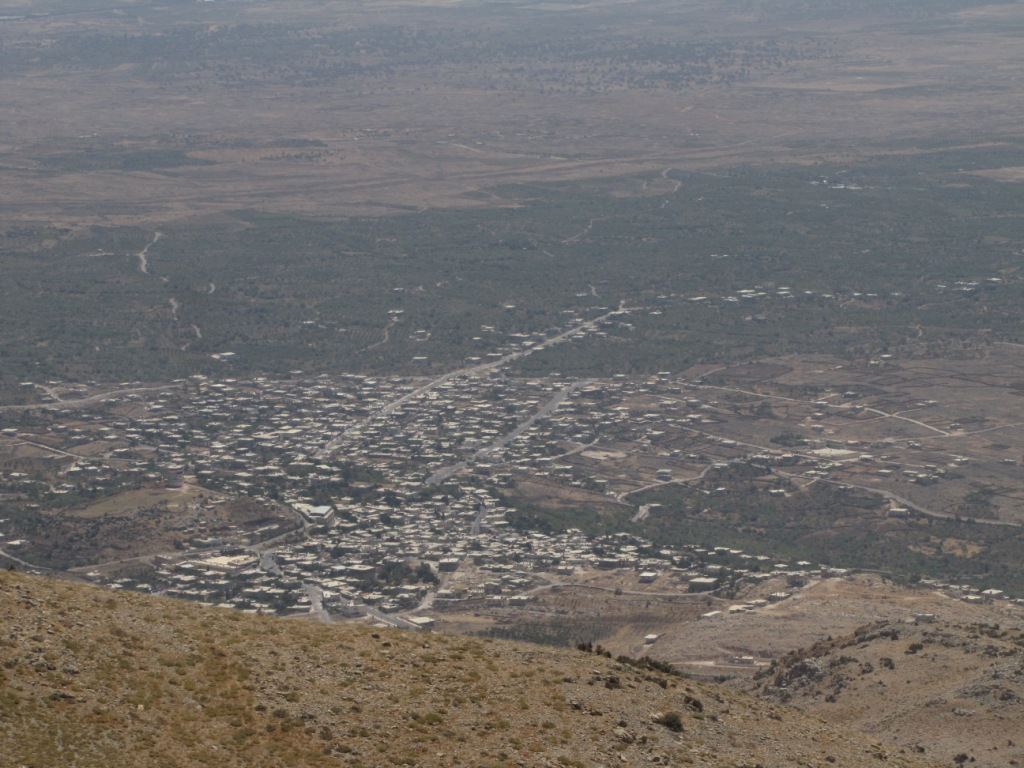
- Hader viewed from a height

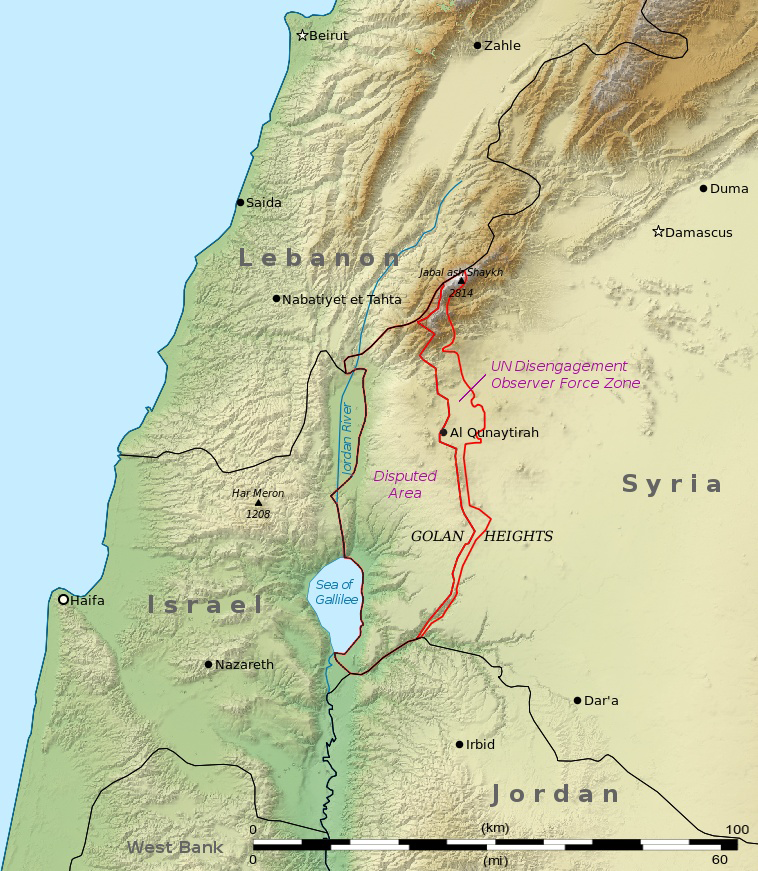
- Location within Golan Heights
- Coordinates: 33°16′46″N 35°49′49″E
- Country: Syria
- Governorate: Quneitra
- District: Quneitra
- Subdistrict: Khan Arnabah

Population (2004)
  - Total: 4,819
- Time zone: UTC+3 (AST (de jure))

Hader (also spelt Hadar; Arabic: حضر) is a village in southern Syria, administratively part of the Khan Arnabah Subdistrict of the Quneitra Governorate. It is in the portion of the governorate that is under de jure Syrian control. The outer suburbs of the town are within the United Nations Disengagement Observer Force Zone. Nearby localities include Beit Jinn to the northeast, Harfa to the east, Jubata al-Khashab to the south, Majdal Shams in the Israeli-occupied Golan Heights to the west and Shebaa in Lebanon to the northwest. The village has been occupied by Israel since 2024.

== Population ==
According to the Syria Central Bureau of Statistics, Hader had a population of 4,819 in the 2004 census. Its inhabitants are predominantly from the Druze community.

== History ==
The presence of the Druze around Mount Hermon is documented since the founding of the Druze religion in the beginning of the 11th century.

In the 1895–1896 conflict between the Druze of Hauran and the Ottoman government and their local allies, Hader and nearby Hina were assaulted by Circassians and Bedouin fighters from the Golan allied with the Ottomans. This followed a Druze attack which devastated 12 villages in the Hauran plain near al-Shaykh Maskin. Following the attack on Hader, Druze fighters from Majdal Shams retaliated by attacking the Circassian-inhabited village of Mansura, which in turn led to Ottoman and Circassian raids against the Druze villages in the Golan.

In mid-June 2015, during the Quneitra offensive of the Syrian Civil War, rebel forces reportedly surrounded the village, which was pro-Assad. However, their motives are disputed.

Even though the surrounding localities were under rebel control, the town remained under government control for the entire duration of the civil war.

On 13 March 2019, Israel accused senior Lebanese Hezbollah operative Ali Musa Daqduq of having been sent to Syria and founding a network of "a few" Syrian operatives manning outposts in Hader and collecting intelligence against Israeli targets.

In December 2024, amid the collapse of Ba'athist Syria and an Israeli invasion, during a recorded community meeting, Druze residents of Hader called for the town to be annexed by Israel, arguing that this would be the "lesser evil" compared to the new Syrian government. In May 2025, the IDF established a forward medical facility in Hader, treating more than 500 Syrian civilians from the surrounding area.

== See also ==
- Druze in Syria

== Bibliography ==
- Firro, Kais (1992). A History of the Druzes. Vol. 1. BRILL. ISBN 9004094377.
