= Ma'ariya =

Ma'ariya معرية Umm Sharq
- Village
- Location within Syria
- Coordinates: 32°45′51″N 35°47′54″E
- Grid position: 224/241 PAL
- Country: Syria
- Governorate: Daraa
- District: Daraa
- Subdistrict: Shajara
- Control: Israel

Population (2004 census)
  - Total: 1,083
- Time zone: UTC+3 (AST)

Ma'ariya (Arabic: معرية, romanized: Ma'ariya, also transliterated Ma'ari), also known as Umm Sharq, is a village in southern Syria, administratively part of the Daraa Governorate, located west of Daraa. According to the Syria Central Bureau of Statistics, Ma'ariya had a population of 1,083 in the 2004 census.

== History ==
=== Ottoman period ===
In 1596 Ma'ariya appeared in the Ottoman tax registers as part of the nahiya (subdistrict) of Jawlan Sharqi in the Qada of Hauran. It had an all Muslim population consisting of 5 households. A fixed tax−rate of 25% was paid on wheat (450 akçe), barley (180 a.), summer crops (70 a.), goats and/or beehives (50 a.), in addition to taxes occasional revenues (50 a.); a total of 900 akçe.

In 1884, American archaeologist Gottlieb Schumacher described Ma'ariya (which he spelled 'M'arri') as an "uninhabited spot, where there are scattered ruins of considerable extent, but no remains of archaeological interest". He noted it laid just east of Arqub al-Rahwa, which called the presumed Biblical Argob, and that both sites were built on the same hill shoulder. The name 'M'arri' was that of a Muslim saintly figure buried in a close-by cavernous area underneath a terebinth tree. Bedouins from the local Manadhira tribe grew tobacco, grain and vegetables on the slopes by the site.

=== 2024 invasion by Israel ===
In December 2024 Israel invaded further into Syria. On 19 December, it was reported that the Israeli military has prevented Syrian farmers in Ma'ariya from accessing their fields.

== Bibliography ==
- Hütteroth, W.-D.; Abdulfattah, K. (1977). Historical Geography of Palestine, Transjordan and Southern Syria in the Late 16th Century. Erlanger Geographische Arbeiten, Sonderband 5. Erlangen, Germany: Vorstand der Fränkischen Geographischen Gesellschaft. ISBN 3-920405-41-2.
- Schumacher, G. (1886). Across the Jordan: Being an Exploration and Survey of part of Hauran and Jaulan. London: Richard Bentley and Son.
