= Trinjeh =

Village in Quneitra, Syria

Trinjeh طرنجة
- Village
- Location in Syria
- Coordinates: 33.2330665°N 35.8446607°E
- Country: Syria
- Governorate: Quneitra Governorate
- District: Quneitra District

Area
  - Total: 50 ha (120 acres)
- Elevation: 1,050 m (3,440 ft)

Population (2012)
  - Total: 2,100
  - Density: 4,200/km^{2} (11,000/sq mi)

Trinjeh (Arabic: طرنجة) is a village located in the northern part of the Quneitra Governorate in Syria. It lies approximately 20 km northeast of the city of Quneitra, near the town of Jubata al-Khashab.

== Geography ==
The village is situated at an elevation of 1,050 meters above sea level. Its climate is mild in summer and very cold in winter, with an average annual rainfall of 1,000 mm. Snowfall often reaches a thickness of about one meter.

== History ==
Trinjeh is built on the ruins of an ancient town dating back to the Roman and Byzantine periods. Archaeological discoveries in the village include a stone slab with a cross and carvings of animals such as cows, lions, and fish, all attributed to the Byzantine era. Additionally, remnants of ancient buildings are still present beneath modern structures. To the east of the village lies an archaeological site known as "Khirbet Trinjeh".

The first modern houses in the village were built in 1835, using basalt stones abundant in the area. Today, some of these historical houses remain intact alongside modern concrete structures.

== Economy ==
The village's economy is primarily agricultural. Residents grow various crops, including figs, grapes, olives, cherries, and apples. Cereals such as barley, wheat, lentils, and chickpeas are also cultivated. Livestock farming, including cattle, sheep, goats, and poultry, complements agricultural activities.

Trinjeh also features a natural forest spanning 330 hectares, which includes oak, pine, and other tree species. The forest attracts many visitors, particularly during the spring and summer months.

== Infrastructure and Services ==
As of 2012, Educational facilities in the village included:

- Al-Shahid Hussein Hassan Qasim School (Intermediate level)
- Al-Shahid Ahmed Qasim Mohammed School (Elementary and Intermediate levels)

High school students attend secondary education in nearby Jubbata al-Khashab.

Healthcare services are provided by the health center in Jubbata al-Khashab. Additionally, there is a local agricultural guidance unit to support farming activities.

== Population ==
As of 2012, the population of Trinjeh was approximately 2,100 residents. Its inhabitants are predominantly Sunni Muslims.

== Landmarks ==
Trinjeh is home to the shrine of Abu Dharr al-Ghifari.

== During the Syrian civil war ==
Trinjeh witnessed many clashes during the Syrian civil war between Assad regime forces and opposition forces.

Following the fall of the Assad regime on 8 December 2024, the Israeli military launched an invasion into Syrian territory, seizing control of numerous towns and villages, including Trinjeh.

== See also ==
- Israeli occupation of the Golan Heights
- Israeli–Syrian ceasefire line incidents during the Syrian civil war
