= Wiam Wahhab =

Lebanese politician (born 1964)

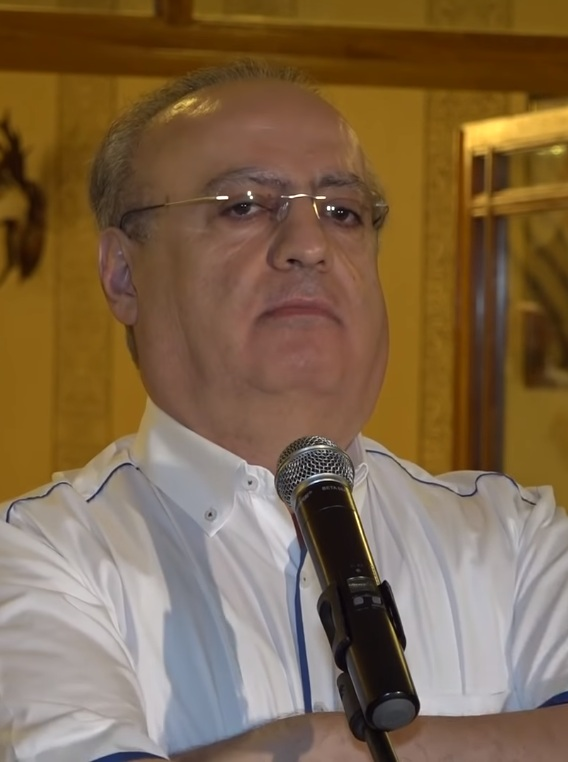
- Wahhab in 2019

Leader of the Arab Unification Party
- Incumbent
- Assumed office 26 May 2006
- Preceded by: Party established

Minister of Environment
- In office 26 October 2004 – 19 April 2005
- Prime Minister: Omar Karami
- Preceded by: Farès Boueiz
- Succeeded by: Tarek Mitri

Personal details
- Born: 11 October 1964 (age 61) Jahliyeh, Lebanon
- Party: Arab Unification Party (2006–present); Independent (Before 2006)
- Children: Rida Wahab

Wiam Maher Najib Wahhab (Arabic: وئام وهاب; born on 11 October 1964) is a Lebanese politician and journalist from Jahlieh, Chouf District, and the founder of the Arab Unification Party.

== Biography ==
Born to a Druze family, he ran for parliamentary elections in 1996 and won 12,000 votes but lost the elections.

He heads the Arab Unification Party that he founded on 26 May 2006, and whose principles are based on cross-border: secularism, sects, doctrines and narrow fanaticism, and his rejection of all forms of injustice, exploitation, feudalism, deprivation and sanctification of public freedoms and human rights.

Wahhab was the target of assassination attempts in the Hasbaya District in 2006 and in the town of Kfar Him, Chouf District in 2008 for rejecting the feudal reality in the Druze community.

Wahhab was in the 2018 parliamentary elections against the March 8 and March 14 alliances, and the slogan of his battle was the war on corruption, and the list that led by a number of independent candidates for March 8 and 14. He received 13,000 votes and defeated candidate Marwan Hamadeh by preferential votes, with 7,391 votes against 7,266 yet still lost the elections since his list failed to reach the required electoral quotient.

In the 2022 parliamentary elections Wahhab formed an electoral alliance with FPM and Talal Arslan yet lost the elections once again.

== Controversy ==
During a television interview, Wahhab made disparaging comments about the Niqab which Saudi women wear. Sunni Muslim groups protested. Wahhab apologized to Saudi women for the niqab remarks.

Wahhab commented on Turkey's warnings to Syria during the 2011 uprising by claiming that Syria and Bashar al-Assad were prepared to launch 100,000 rockets at Turkey if it tried to invade.

The US has placed financial sanctions on Wahhab.

Following the Israel–Hezbollah conflict (2023–present) and its impact on Lebanon, Wahhab was quoted saying: “We must permanently abandon this mentality of war with Israel,”, he continued and said: “the only victor in the region is Israeli Prime Minister Benjamin Netanyahu, who continues to reshape the Middle East.”

Turning to the turmoil in Syria, Wahhab linked his concerns to the instability that followed the fall of the Assad regime and the subsequent clashes in southern Syria, particularly those targeting the Druze community in Suwayda. He described the conflict as an existential threat to his community. Speaking in a televised interview, he warned: "This is a war for the survival of the Druze." He stressed that the violence in Syria was no longer a matter of shifting political alignments but a struggle in which the Druze must defend their very presence in the region.

== Personal life ==
Wahhab's daughter, Rida, played for the Lebanon national football team.
