= Israeli invasion of Syria (2024–present) =

Israeli military operation against Syria

- Part of the Middle Eastern crisis, the spillover of the Gaza war and the Arab–Israeli conflict
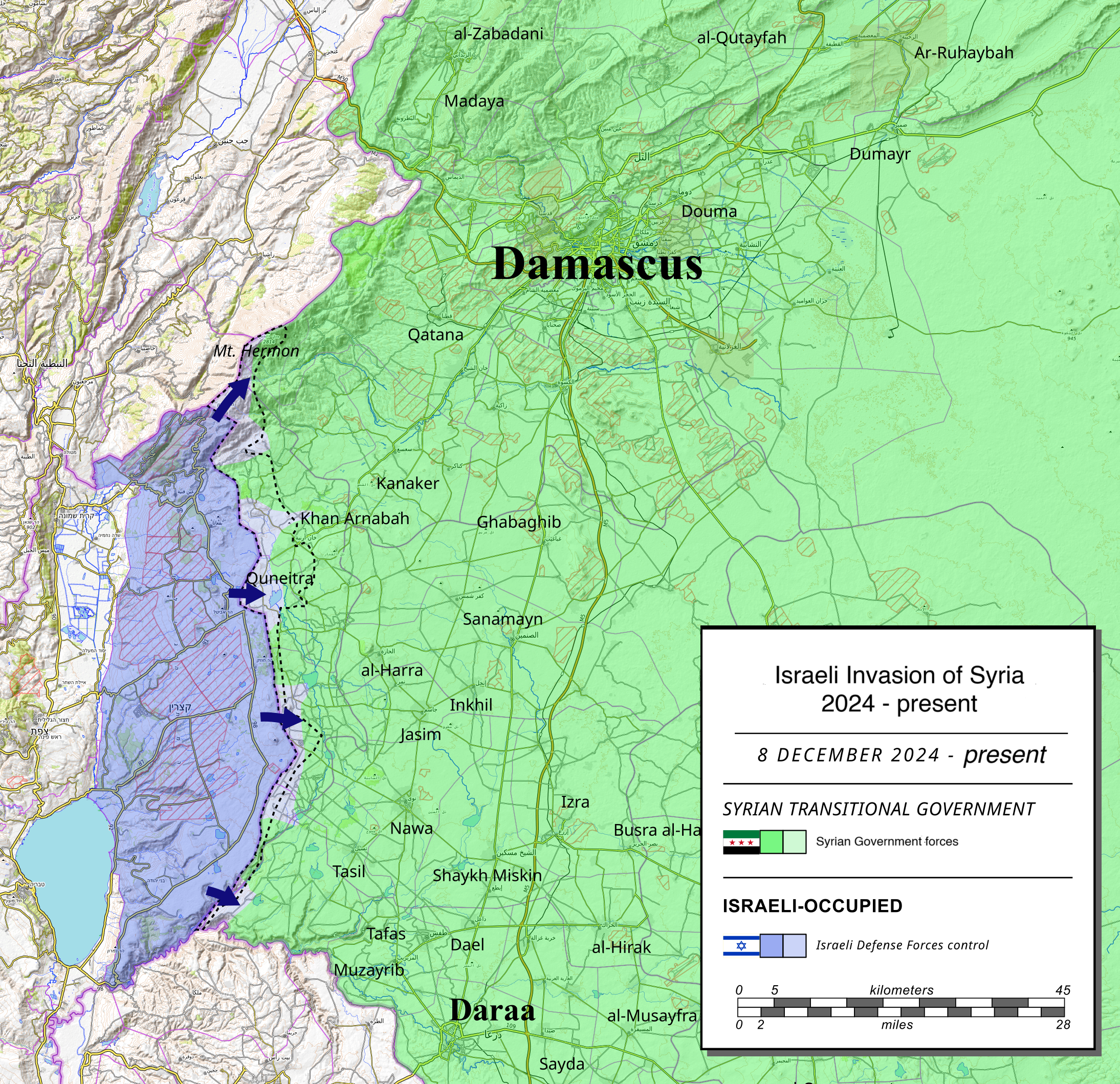
- Territory controlled by the Syrian government; Syrian territory occupied by Israel since 2024; Israeli-occupied Golan Heights
Date	Main invasion: 8–9 December 2024 (1 day); Intermittent raids: 9 December 2024–present (1 year, 10 months, 1 week and 6 days)
Location	Quneitra and Daraa governorates, Syria
Status	Ongoing
Territorial changes	Israel advanced within and beyond the UNDOF buffer zone, capturing Madinat al-Salam, Khan Arnabah, Ma'ariya, Al-Wehda Dam, and Quneitra, as well as the Syrian-controlled side of Mount Hermon; Israeli forces also reached parts of Qatana District; Israeli Forces raided the villages of Koudna, Tal al-Ahmar al-Sharqi on 3 May 2026

Belligerents
Israel; Supreme Legal Committee in Suwayda (2025–2026); Administrative Council of Jabal Bashan (2026–Present)	Syria (Palestine) Palestinian militants Assad loyalists	(United Nations) UNDOF Zone

Commanders and leaders
Benjamin Netanyahu; Israel Katz; Eyal Zamir; Herzi Halevi (until 2025); Tomer Bar; Ori Gordin; Hikmat al-Hijri	(Syria) Ahmed al-Sharaa; Murhaf Abu Qasra; Ali Noureddine al-Naasan; Asim Hawari	(United Nations) Anita Asmah (United Nations) Patrick Gauchat (until January 2025) (United Nations) Nirmal Kumar Thapa (until 11 December 2024)

Units involved
Israel Defense Forces; Israeli Ground Forces; 36th Div.; 7th Brig.; 98th Div.; 35th Brigade; Oz Brigade; 210th Div.; 55th Paratroopers Brigade; 474th Golan; 810th Brigade; Israeli Air Force; 7th Wing; Unit 5101; Unit 669; Israeli Navy	(Syrian opposition) Syrian transitional government; SOR; Syrian Armed Forces; Army; Air Force; (Palestine) Palestinian militants; (Palestine) al-Deif Brigades; Hamas; (Hamas) Al-Qassam Brigades; (Palestinian Islamic Jihad) PIJ; (Palestinian Islamic Jihad) Al-Quds Brigades; SSNP; Eagles of the Whirlwind; IRFS; SPR; JI; Al-Fajr Forces	United Nations peacekeeping; (United Nations) UNDOF

Strength
(Israel) 6,000–10,000+ troops	(Syria) 100,000+ soldiers and fighters	Unknown

Casualties and losses
Per Israel: 1 soldier killed (non-combat); 9 soldiers injured (including 3 non-combat); Per SOHR: 14 soldiers injured Per Syrian Popular Resistance: Multiple wounded 1+ vehicles damaged	Per SNHR: 71 civilians killed 6 soldiers killed (Note: 8 civilians killed in December 2024 62 civilians killed during 2025: 1 civilian killed on 15 January 2025; 1 civilian killed on 8 February 2025; 10 civilians killed in March 2025; 3 civilians and 1 soldier killed on 17 March 2025; 6 (armed) civilians killed on 25 March 2025; 9 (armed) civilians killed on 3 April 2025; 4 civilians killed on 2 May 2025; 1 civilian killed on 30 May 2025; 1 civilian killed on 12 June 2025; 3 civilians killed on 16 July 2025; 5 soldiers killed on 26 August 2025; 14 civilians killed in December 2025; 1 civilian killed on 3 April 2026); 88+ arrested/detained (Note: SNHR documentation of arrests & detentions: 2 arrested (a French journalist and Syrian lawyer) on 8 January 2025; 4 SARC ambulance crew detained on 15 February 2025; "Repeated arrests of civilians" between December 2024 – 25 February 2025; 1 resident arrested on 11 March 2025; 4 young men arrested 21–24 March 2025; 2 civilians detained on 10 May 2025; Approximately 13 civilians arrested 9 June–8 July 2025; 3 civilians arrested on 9 June 2025; 7 civilians arrested on 12 June 2025 4 civilians arrested on 31 July 2025; 2 civilians arrested on 11 September 2025; 4 civilians detained on 17 September 2025; 1 civilian arrested on 19 September 2025; 3 civilians detained on 4 October 2025; 5 civilians detained on 10 October 2025; 1 civilian detained on 20 October 2025; 1 civilian detained on 26 October 2025; 2 civilians arrested on 4 November 2025; 2 civilians arrested on 10 December 2025; 46 detained January–March 2026; 4 civilians detained on 8 January 2026; 2 children detained on 19 January 2026; 2 civilians detained on 24 January 2026; 1 civilian detained on 28 January 2026; 2 civilians detained on 2 February 2026; 6 civilians detained on 18 February 2026; 2 civilians detained on 4 March 2026; 2 children detained on 29 March 2026 1 civilian detained on 11 April 2026; 2 children detained on 20 April 2026; 1 civilian detained on 2 June 2026; 1 child detained on 7 June 2026); Per SOHR: 44–54 civilians killed 38–43 soldiers killed (Note: SOHR documentation of civilians & soldiers killed: 1 civilian killed on 8 December 2024; 2 civilians killed on 9 December 2024; 1 civilian killed on 11 December 2024; 11 people "believed to be" killed on 29 December 2024, "mostly civilians"; 1 civilian and 2 soldiers killed on 15 January 2025; 1 civilian killed on 8 February 2025; 2 soldiers killed on 25 February 2025; 3 civilians and 1 soldier killed on 17 March 2025; 1 civilian killed between 23 and 25 March 2025; 7 (armed) civilians killed on 25 March 2025; 4 soldiers killed on 2 April 2025; 9 (armed) civilians killed on 3 April 2025; 1 civilian killed on 3 May 2025; 1 other civilian killed in May 2025; 1 civilian killed on 12 June 2025; 15 soldiers and 3 civilians killed 13–16 July; 1 soldier killed on 15 July 2025; 12 soldiers and 3 civilians killed on 16 July 2025 1 civilian and 6 soldiers killed on 26 August 2025; 7 civilians and 6 gunmen killed on 28 November 2025; 8 soldiers killed from September-December 2025; 1 young man killed on 7 March 2026; 1 civilian killed on 3 April 2026; 2 people killed on 28 June 2026); 6 gunmen killed 1 unknown person killed 174+ arrested (Note: SOHR documentation of arrests: 2 young men and "all the residents" of Rasm Al-Rawadi village arrested on 8 December 2024; 1 young man arrested on 25 December 2024; 1 young man arrested on 5 January 2025; 1 young man arrested on 24 January 2025; 1 young man arrested on 19 February 2025; 1 young man arrested on 12 March 2025; 4 young men arrested on 22 March 2025; 1 father arrested on 26 April 2025; 2 arrested (a taxi driver and his son) on 10 May 2025; 1 young man arrested on 25 May 2025; "Several" civilians arrested on 9 June 2025; 3 sanitation workers arrested on 11 June 2025; 7 civilians arrested on 12 June 2025; 2 young men arrested on 14 June 2025; 4 civilians arrested on 16 June 2025; 2 young men arrested on 29 June 2025; 3 Palestinian civilians arrested on 2 July 2025; 2 civilians arrested on 7 July 2025; 1 young man arrested on 11 August 2025; 2 young men arrested on 12 August 2025; 3 young men arrested on 21 August 2025; "Several" suspects arrested on 21 August 2025; 1 civilian arrested on 21 August 2025; 1 young man arrested on 26 August 2025; 2 young men arrested on 28 August 2025; 7 young men arrested on 3 September 2025; 2 civilians arrested on 11 September 2025; 1 young man arrested on 14 September 2025; 2 persons arrested on 17 September 2025; 1 sphepherd arrested on 19 September 2025; 1 civilian arrested on 20 September 2025; 3 young men arrested on 4 October 2025; 2 civilians arrested on 10 October 2025; 1 civilian arrested on 20 October 2025; 1 student arrested on 26 October 2025; 2 young men arrested on 30 October 2025; 2 young men detained on 4 November 2025; 4 members of a family arrested on 16 November 2025; 1 civilian arrested on 28 November 2025; 1 man arrested on 10 December 2025; 1 young civilian arrested on 10 December 2025; 2 individuals arrested on 12 December 2025; 3 civilians arrested on 15 December 2025; 1 young man arrested on 16 December 2025; 1 civilian arrested on 18 December 2025; 2 young men arrested on 23 December 2025; 1 young man arrested on 24 December 2025; "Several" young men arrested on 28 December 2025; 1 civilian arrested on 30 December 2025; 4 young men arrested on 8 January 2026; 1 young man arrested on 12 January 2026; 3 civilians arrested on 15 January 2026; 2 young men arrested on 24 January 2026; 1 young man arrested on 28 January 2026; 1 shepherd arrested on 4 February 2026; 1 young man arrested on 4 February 2026; 1 young man arrested on 13 February 2026; 3 shepherds arrested on 15 February 2026; 3 civilians arrested on 16 February 2026; 1 young man arrested on 17 February 2026; 2 young men arrested on 18 February 2026; 1 child arrested on 19 February 2026; 1 shepherd arrested on 25 February 2026; 1 child arrested on 2 March 2026; 4 civilians arrested on 3 March 2026; 2 arrested on 4 March 2026; 2 children arrested on 5 March 2026; 4 children arrested on 8 March 2026; 2 children arrested on 10 March 2026; 4 shepherds arrested on 12 March 2026; 1+ young men arrested on 23 March 2026; 2 sphepherds arrested on 25 March 2026; 2 people arrested on 27 March 2026; 1 farmer detained on 29 March 2026; 1 shepherd arrested on 30 March 2026; 1 child arrested on 4 April 2026; 2 young men arrested on 7 April 2026; 2 civilians arrested on 11 April 2026; 1 young man arrested on 12 April 2026; 1 young man arrested on 19 April 2026; 2 young men arrested on 20 April 2026; 1 young man arrested on 21 April 2026; 1 civilian arrested on 24 April 2026; 1 young man arrested on 13 May 2026; 1 young man arrested on 14 May 2026; 2 children arrested on 20 May 2026; 1 young man arrested on 24 May 2026; 1 young man arrested on 4 June 2026; 7 arrested, 6–11 June 2026; 1 young man arrested, 6 June 2026; 4 people arrested on 7 June 2026; 1 young man arrested on 9 June 2026; 1 shepherd arrested on 19 June 2026; 1 agricultural worker arrested on 21 June 2026; 2 civilians arrested from 23 to 24 June 2026; 1 young man arrested on 26 June 2026; 1 young man arrested 15 June 2026); Several tanks and drones lost Per BBC: 7 journalists detained Material losses: Multiple military sites destroyed as well as ground, air and naval assets.	Unknown

Following the fall of the Assad regime on 8 December 2024, Israel invaded the demilitarized buffer zone in southwestern Syria (adjacent to the Israeli-occupied Golan Heights) and has continued to occupy it. Israel also carried out an airstrike campaign to cripple the Syrian Armed Forces, and demanded that it stay out of southern Syria. The Israeli government remarked that these actions were intended to prevent any "potential threat" from post-war Syria.

Israel took advantage of the power vacuum created by the fall of former Syrian President Bashar al-Assad to increase the amount of territory it controlled by several hundred square miles. Israel declared the 1974 Agreement on Disengagement with Ba'athist Syria to be void. Israel initially said this new invasion would be "temporary", but later said it would hold onto the territory for an "unlimited time". Israel also launched extensive aerial and naval strikes on Syrian military targets across the country, under an operation codenamed Operation Arrow of Bashan (Hebrew: מבצע חץ הבשן, romanized: Mivtza Ḥetz HaBashan). Israel's campaign crippled Syria's military capabilities, including its army and its navy.

Israel's campaign in Syria was internationally condemned and was accused of violating international law. Syrian President Ahmed al-Sharaa condemned Israel's actions and demanded withdrawal, but also said his country was not in a position to be drawn into another war following the 13-year Syrian civil war.

On 25 February 2025, Israel deepened its invasion of southern Syria while conducting a wave of airstrikes there and in Damascus, one day after demanding the Syrian caretaker government demilitarize southern Syria. Since the July 2025 Suwayda clashes, Israel has launched airstrikes against the Syrian military that it says are in defense of the Syrian Druze.

By December 2025, the Armed Conflict Location and Event Data reported that since the invasion, Israel has carried out attacks across Syria more than 600 times, averaging nearly two times a day.

== Background ==
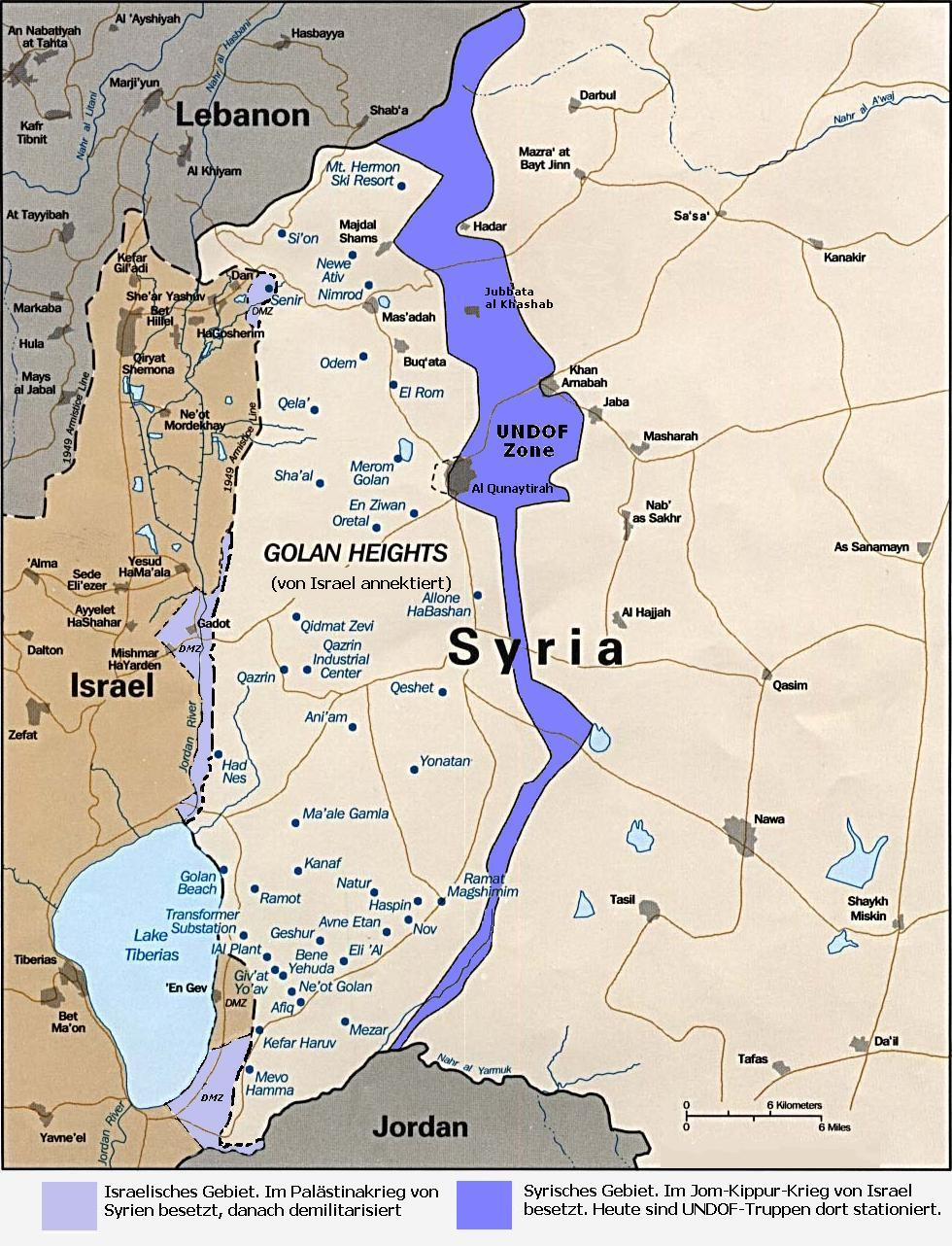
Map of the UNDOF Zone (in purple)

Since the Six-Day War in 1967, Israel has occupied most of the Golan Heights region of Syria. After the Yom Kippur War in 1973, Israel and Syria agreed to a ceasefire which created the UN Disengagement Observer Force (UNDOF), which maintains a small buffer zone between the two countries forces. In 1981, Israel annexed the region, a move condemned by the United Nations and unrecognized by any country except the United States (recognized 2019). During its occupation, Israel has depopulated Syrian towns and villages and promoted Israeli settlement in the Heights.

In November 2024, the United Nations accused Israel of violating the 1974 Agreement on Disengagement in November with engineering work and battle tanks inside the demilitarized zone. UNDOF stated it had "repeatedly engaged with the IDF to protest the construction." Israel responded that it was "working to establish a barrier on Israeli territory exclusively in order to thwart a possible terrorist invasion and protect the security of Israel's borders," and that "Israeli and IDF officials maintain close contact with UN officials who are familiar with the threats in the region."

In November 2024, the Syrian opposition launched a major offensive against the Bashar al-Assad led Syrian regime. Following the fall of the Assad regime on 8 December, Israeli Minister of Diaspora Affairs and Combating Antisemitism Amichai Chikli expressed apprehension at the opposition forces' political upheaval of the Syrian government, claiming that: "Most of Syria is now under the control of al-Qaeda and Daesh." He implored Israel to re-fortify its defensive line at Mount Hermon in Israeli-occupied Golan Heights based on 1974 borders in order to prevent potential attacks by the new regime.

The collective of Druze community leaders in Syria condemned the invasion. The newly formed Suwayda Military Council declared its commitment to integrating into the Syrian Army while also supporting the demilitarization of southern Syria. The Sheikh al-Karama Forces, a Druze military organization affiliated with the FSA condemned the invasion as a violation of Syria's sovereignty and stated they would work with opposition forces. Sheikh al-Karama Forces had issued a joint statement with the Al-Jabal Brigade in January 2025 emphasizing that it was prepared to integrate into a united "military body" in southern Syria.

== Israeli objectives ==
On 9 December 2024, Israeli Defense Minister Israel Katz issued orders for military objectives in southern Syria. The IDF received four primary strategic objectives from Katz to conduct "in the immediate term":

1. To secure complete control over the buffer zone and other nearby strategic positions in Syria.
2. To establish a security zone extending beyond the buffer zone, focusing on removing all heavy weaponry and terrorist infrastructure that could pose a threat to Israel, while establishing contact with local Druze communities and other regional communities.
3. To immediately prevent the reestablishment of Iranian arms smuggling routes to Lebanon through Syrian territory and border crossings.
4. To continue destroying strategic heavy weapons systems throughout Syria, including air defense networks, missile systems, and coastal defense installations.

Israel has also stated its demands for all Syrian territory south of Damascus to be demilitarized, including the governorates of Quneitra, Daraa and Suwayda, and that it would not tolerate threats against the Druze in southern Syria.

== Events ==
=== Ground operations ===
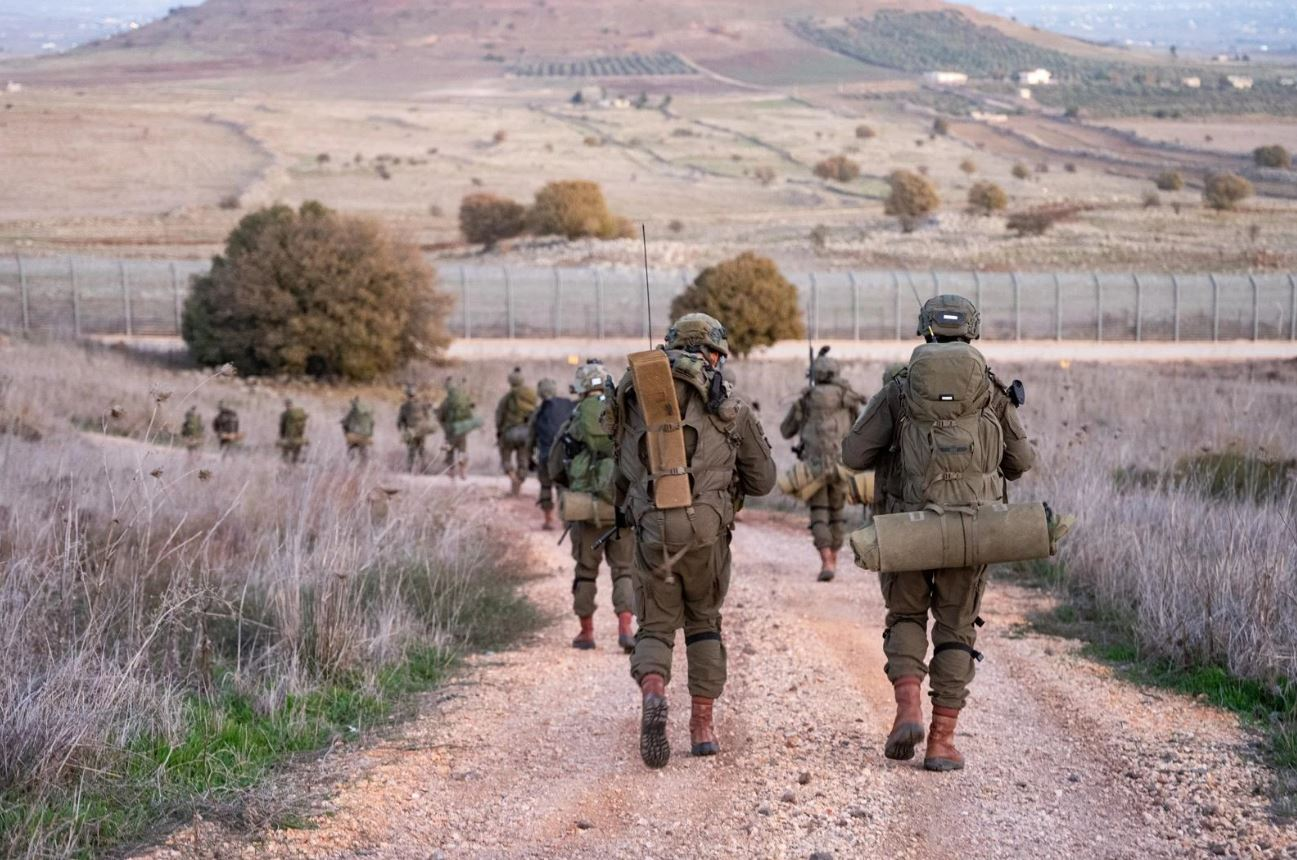
Israeli soldiers patrolling the ceasefire line in the Golan Heights, December 2024

Following the advance of the Syrian opposition in the south, Israel reinforced Division 210 and deployed additional troops to the Golan Heights. When Syrian opposition forces first occupied the southern town of Hader, it was reported that the IDF had advanced further into the Golan Heights to repel an attack on a United Nations post in the area. Additionally, the IDF significantly reinforced its presence within the established buffer zone.

==== 2024 ====
On 8 December 2024, Israeli armored units, including main battle tanks, crossed the ceasefire line in the occupied Golan Heights fence and entered the buffer zone during early morning operations. Israeli Army Radio stated that the IDF and Northern Command initiated the operation in order to strengthen its border with Syria and prevent spillover or attacks against Israel.

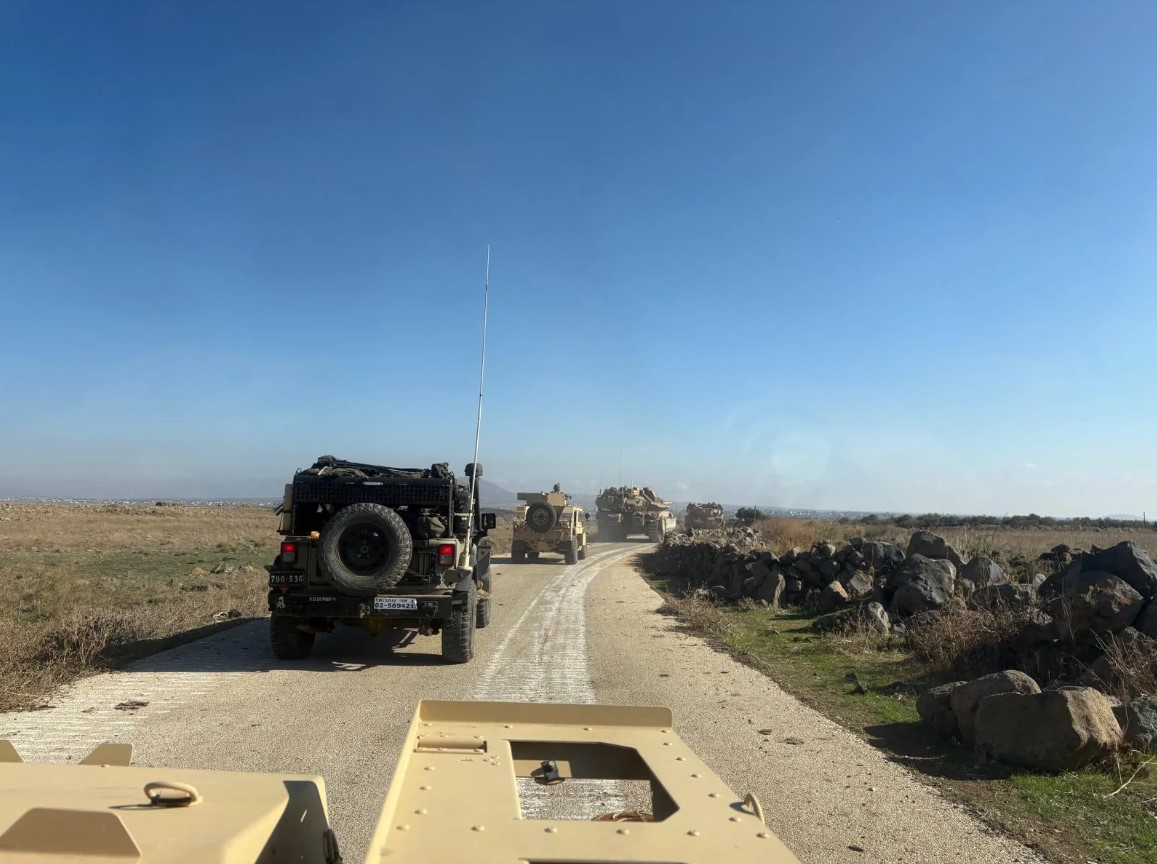
Israeli convoy advancing into Syria, December 2024

The military advance extended into the Quneitra Governorate, with substantial forces entering the town of Khan Arnabah. Syrian media reported that Israeli forces had advanced into the city center of al-Salam. Following the advance into the Quneitra Governorate and the Syrian-controlled side of Mount Hermon by the Israeli Special Forces Shaldag Unit (Unit 5101), Israeli Prime Minister Benjamin Netanyahu issued a statement saying that the 1974 ceasefire agreement had collapsed when Syrian soldiers abandoned their posts in the Golan Heights, and that the area was to be temporarily occupied (Note: By 11 February the IDF changed course, stating that the area will be permanently occupied.) He also stated that "We will not allow any hostile force to establish itself on our border". Netanyahu stated Assad's fall "offers great opportunity" to occupy more Syrian territory. During the takeover, IDF spokesman Avichay Adraee announced a curfew in five Syrian villages, including Quneitra, ordering locals of the border towns to remain inside "until further notice." On 8 December 2024, Al Arabiya reported that Israel had taken control of Tell al-Hara. On 10 December 2024, correspondents for Al Jazeera and Enab Baladi reported Israeli tanks in several Syrian villages such as Beer Ajam. Although Israeli tanks were also reported as far as Qatana, 26 kilometres (16 mi) from Damascus an IDF spokesman insisted that "IDF forces are not advancing towards Damascus. This is not something we are doing or pursuing in any way" while acknowledging that, beyond the buffer zone, "a few additional points" had been seized. The Israeli Defense Minister also stated that Israel aims to establish a "sterile defence zone" in southern Syria to "prevent the establishment and organisation of terror in Syria".

On 11 December, orthodox Chabad Jews printed the Tanya, a central Chabad religious text, from a light truck on Syrian land, at the base of Mount Hermon, a short distance to the east of the purple line.

On 12 December, Syrian residents of Hader, Hamidiya, and Umm Batna in Quneitra Governorate were displaced from their homes after the IDF entered with military vehicles, with Israeli troops subsequently probing Umm Batna in its entirety.

From 12 to 13 December, Syrian sources reported that Israeli forces conducted formal meetings with local community representatives in the Yarmouk Basin area in southwestern Daraa Governorate, reportedly using loudspeakers and a low-flying drone to broadcast messages urging meetings and requirements. The Israeli military reportedly articulated specific security requirements for the local population, including the surrender of all weapons in the village, compliance with home search operations, and the prohibition of armed resistance against any military operations. Syrian sources also claimed that Israeli troops used loudspeakers to warn villagers that the Israeli forces have intentions to search and confiscate weapons in the area.

On 15 December, Israel attempted to depopulate several Syrian villages in the newly occupied part of the Golan Heights. After the residents declined, Israel began destroying the electricity and water networks in the villages to attempt to forcibly evict them. The Israeli government also declared that it would expand Israel settlements in the Golan Heights. Netanyahu announced plans to double the Golan Heights' population in a statement on the same day, saying Israel would continue to hold onto it and that "Strengthening the Golan is strengthening the State of Israel."

On 17 December, Netanyahu met with Defense Minister Israel Katz, Chief of the General Staff Herzi Halevi, commander of the Northern Command Ori Gordin, and Shin Bet head Ronen Bar on the Syrian side of Mount Hermon, where they held a security briefing and visited outposts at the summit. During a video statement filmed on the summit, Netanyahu said that the IDF would stay in Syria "until another solution ensuring Israel's security is found".

On 18 December, it was reported that over 100 Syrian families had been forcibly expelled from the Golan Heights by the Israeli military. Witnesses describe that Israeli soldiers had opened fire on them and on their homes. The United Nations peacekeepers have been removing Israeli flags in the newly occupied area.

On 19 December, it was reported that the Israeli military is preventing Syrian farmers in Ma'ariya from accessing their fields.

On 20 December, the Israeli military occupied two addition Syrian villages, Jamlah and Maaraba, and then shot bullets at Syrians protesting the Israeli occupation.

On 25 December, the Israeli military shot at protesters in the Syrian villages of Suweisa and Diwaya Al-Kabira in the Quneitra Governorate.

On 30 December, Israeli forces advanced into Madinat al-Baath and searched the local administrative offices. On the same day, Israeli military lecturer Rami Simani stated that Syria has "never had a real right to exist" and that "Israel can and must cause Syria to disappear", advocating a partition of Syria.

==== 2025 ====
On 9 January, Israeli officials said that they are going to occupy for "the long run" a 15 km "zone of control" and 60 km "sphere of influence" deeper into Syria.

On 31 January, Israeli troops clashed with five pro-Assad Syrian rebels in Trinjeh. The Jerusalem Post reported that the Islamic Resistance Front in Syria was responsible for the attack, but the Syrian Popular Resistance claimed responsibility, claiming that multiple Israeli soldiers were wounded and vehicles were damaged. The IDF said that it suffered no casualties.

On 2 February, the IDF near Jubata al-Khashab and surrounding villages established outposts and military bases with calls for more Israeli settlement into the Golan Heights by Israeli officials.

On 11 February, Israeli Army Radio reported that Israel would prolong the occupation of their newly invaded territory in Syria throughout 2025.

On 23 February, the IDF confirmed that it had built at least nine army posts in Syria, including two on Mount Hermon and seven on the buffer zone.

On 25 February, the IDF completed raids southern Rif Dimashq, in the villages of Al-Kiswa, and Daraa, in the vicinity of the city of Izra and penetrating the outskirts of Al-Bakkar village, and penetrated the administrative borders between the governorates of Daraa and Quneitra in southern Syria and the Ain al-Bayda area in the countryside of Quneitra in southern Syria, also taking the villages of Sidon Al-Golan and Sidon Al-Hanout in the countryside of Quneitra. This came after plans to install advanced military technology, border fencing, and checkpoints in the borders of Gaza, Lebanon, and Syria.

On 27 February, the Islamic Resistance Front in Syria began forming military cells in Southern Syria, likely with Iranian backing.

On 1 March, Netanyahu and Defense Minister Israel Katz ordered the IDF to prepare to defend the Druze community in Jaramana following clashes between Syrian security forces and a local group called the "Jaramana Shield Brigade" that left one Syrian soldier dead.

On 8 March, the IDF announced that it carried out several raids in southern Syria the week prior, capturing and destroying weapons.

On 19 March 2025, Israel launched its largest incursion yet, capturing the village of Al-Adnaniyah in the countryside of Quneitra Governorate.

On 25 March, several Syrian gunmen attacked Israeli soldiers in Kuwaya. No Israeli troops were harmed, and five people were killed by retaliatory fire and a drone strike. Also that day, the IDF announced that the Paratroopers Brigade and Yahalom had carried out several raids against weapon storage sites in southern Syria in recent weeks.

On 2 April, Israeli forces conducted a deep incursion in Daraa Governorate, advancing towards Nawa. Mosques called upon residents to defend, and some 2,000 men bearing hunting rifles or no arms mobilised to prevent the Israelis from capturing the nearby Jabiliya Dam, whose reservoir supplies water to Nawa and its surrounding settlements. In response, Israeli forces conducted drone strikes that killed nine people, although they later withdrew. Thousands attended the funerals of those killed the following day, including Daraa governor Anwar al-Zoubi.

On 4 April, it was reported that the Israeli military and Israeli settler movement began organizing trips for Israeli civilians inside the newly occupied part of Syria.

On 10 April, the Israeli newspaper Ynet reported that Israeli soldiers have been shooting at Syrian shepherds and that 100 sheep had been killed. The Israelis have also prevented Syrians from accessing their farmland and have fired towards and threatened Syrian civilians at the Al-Mantra Dam in Quneitra.

On 29 April, Israeli minister Bezalel Smotrich stated: "we will end this campaign when Syria is dismantled".

On 1 May, an Israeli soldier from the 890th Battalion was killed and three others suffered minor injuries following a car accident during an operation on Highway 98 in the Golan Heights.

On 3 May, the IDF announced that it sent troops to southern Syria who were ready to "prevent the entry of hostile forces into the area of Druze villages" amid deadly clashes in the area. It also evacuated 15 Syrian Druze wounded in the clashes to hospitals in Israel throughout the week.

On 9 May, seven BBC Arabic journalists, including Feras Kilani, were detained at gunpoint by Israeli soldiers while they were filming in the area of an unguarded checkpoint, around 200 kilometres (120 mi) from Quneitra. The soldiers took them to a room in the crossing point between Quneitra and the Golan Heights, where they were all handcuffed and blindfolded except for Kilani, who was told that he would be treated differently. The team was held for about seven hours, during which they were strip searched, interrogated, and had photos on their phones and laptops deleted.

On 3 June, a barrage of Grad rockets was fired at Israel from Tasil, setting off sirens in northern Israel and the Golan Heights. The rockets struck open areas near Ramat Magshimim, and the IDF responded with artillery fire. A second barrage was fired minutes later, but it is unclear if it came from Syria. A group called the "Martyr Muhammad al-Deif Brigades" claimed responsibility for the attack.

On 12 June, Syrian sources reported that around 100 Israeli soldiers raided Beit Jinn, killing one person and detaining seven others. The IDF said that it arrested several Hamas operatives who were planning attacks on Israel and also uncovered weapons in the area, although villagers denied ties with Hamas.

On 19 June, Israeli forces advanced at least 1.5 km into several towns in the Quneitra Governorate. According to local sources, Israeli soldiers destroyed at least fifteen homes, agricultural and forest areas.

On 13 July, the IDF announced that it seized over three tons of weapons such as bombs, anti-tank mines, and rockets from military facilities in southern Syria that belonged to the Assad government.

On 27 August, Israeli helicopters landed on a hilltop near Damascus and dropped off troops near the Jabal Manea airbase, where they conducted a two-hour operation before withdrawing.

On 14 September, the IDF carried out a ground operation in Daraa province and carried out searches in the towns of Jamla and Saysoun.

On 28 November, Israel's 55th Reserve Paratroopers Brigade, belonging to the 210th Division, launched an incursion and strikes in Beit Jinn in an attempt to apprehend members of the al-Fajr Forces, the military wing of the Islamic Group (Jamaa Islamiya). The operation ended up killing 13 people, including two children and injuring 25 others. The Syrian Foreign Ministry condemned the operation and called the incident as a war crime as well as calling the United Nations Security Council to stop Israel's "policy of aggression". Six Israeli soldiers were also reported injured by militants during clashes in the town. According to the IDF, Israeli forces arrested two individuals affiliated from the group.

On 23 and 25 December, the Israeli military fired at civilians including women and children in the Quneitra countryside.

==== 2026 ====
On 6 January, the Israeli military destroyed the historic Golan Hospital in Quneitra.

In late January 2026, Israeli aircraft sprayed herbicides over large areas of the Quneitra Governorate in southern Syria at least three times, causing crops to turn yellow and die and damaging trees. The operation stretched from the villages of Trinjeh and Jubata al-Khashab in the north to Sidon in the south, and according to the head of the Quneitra Agriculture Directorate, the land of 297 farmers was affected. The Syrian Ministry of Agriculture examined samples of water, soil, and plants from the affected areas and found two agricultural herbicides, 2,4-DB and Diuron, in some plant and soil samples. Analyses using Sentinel-2 satellite data showed a reduction in vegetation cover in the weeks following herbicide spraying.

On 27 June, two people were killed in an Israeli raid near Hodr town in the northern Al-Quinetra countryside. Tensions escalated further, with reported Israeli military incursions into southern Syrian towns, including Abdin, where residents resisted the presence of Israeli troops, leading to exchanges involving warning fire and artillery.

On 25 July, the United Nations Secretary-General António Guterres visited Syria and stated: "Violations of Syria's sovereignty and territorial integrity are unacceptable and must cease. What is happening in the region around the Golan Heights is totally unacceptable," and: "I'd like to remind the international community that the Golan Heights are Syrian territory."

On 10 August, the Islamic Resistance Front in Syria claimed an attack on the Israeli base of Al-Akou, in the Yarmouk Basin area, the group stated that the attack was "in retaliation for the blood of the martyrs and in response to recent Israeli incursions into the area".

On 18 August, the Israeli military fired artillery shells near the town of Abdeen in Daraa.

On 28 August, the Israeli military fired artillery shells near the town of Beit Jinn west of Damascus.

On 5 September, the Israeli military launched attacks against farmland near the village of al-Rafid.

On 6 September, the Israeli military fired towards the village of al-Mashaala killing several sheep. On the same day, the Israeli military fired at several homes in the village of Maariya.

On 7 September, the Israeli military fired smoke grenades towards several homes in the village of Taranja, and launched artillery attacks against farmland in Saida al-Hanout.

On 11, 12 and 13 September, Israeli forces repeatedly shelled the surrounding area of the village of Beit Jinn with artillery. On the 13th, Israeli forces also entered the al-Amal Farms in Quneitra and torched the Ummahat Taranjah Center.

On 5 October, a young Syrian man was shot dead by Israeli forces in the countryside of Quneitra in southern Syria. The IDF claimed the man was attempting to go near an Israeli military site in Syria.

On 22 October, a disabled Syrian man was shot dead by the IDF during an incursion into Jamla village in western Daraa countryside.

=== Air operations ===
==== 2024 ====
On 8 December 2024, the Israeli Air Force conducted targeted operations against weapons storage facilities, which Israel considered strategic threats, across southern Syria to prevent them from falling into the hands of opposition forces. Israeli officials claimed that the targets included small stockpiles of chemical weapons, mainly mustard gas and VX gas, radar-equipped batteries, vehicles of Russian-made air defense missiles, and stockpiles of Scud missiles. The White Helmets reported that: "there was no evidence of unusual toxic fumes during the extinguishing of the fire, and no cases of suffocation were observed among civilians" Israel also reportedly launched airstrikes on Syrian intelligence and customs headquarters, with explosions reported at their locations in Damascus. Later, Israel also heavily shelled Mezzeh Air Base.

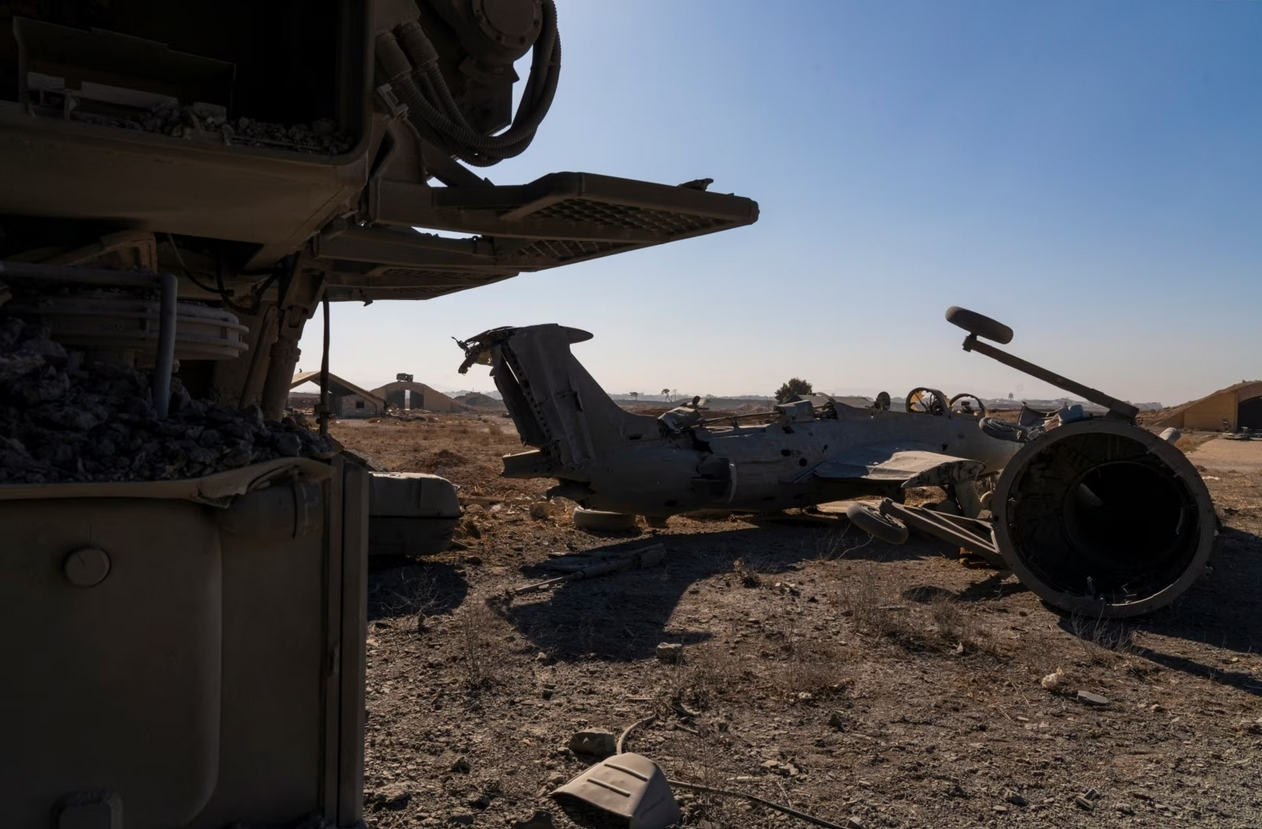
A Syrian warplane destroyed by Israeli airstrikes on Mezzeh Air Base

In the early hours of 9 December 2024, Israel conducted several airstrikes across the Daraa and Suwayda Governorates in southern Syria. Six airstrikes were reported at an airbase north of Suwayda, while multiple others targeted ammo depots in Nawa and the Daraa countryside. By evening, the Israeli Air Force and Navy had struck naval assets in the Port of Latakia, and an alleged chemical weapons production center in Barzeh, and Qamishli Airport in northern Syria. These roughly 200 airstrikes, including strikes on Damascus, Daraa, Latakia, and Hama, destroyed dozens of fighter jets and helicopters in the first phase and the entire Syrian naval fleet in the second. An Israeli senior official said airstrikes would continue on for a couple of days.

In the morning of 10 December, photographs revealed sunken Osa-class missile boats in the Port of Latakia after overnight Israeli strikes. The IDF announced that its air force and navy conducted over 480 strikes in Syria in the span of 48 hours, 350 of which targeted airfields, anti-aircraft batteries, missiles, drones, fighter jets, tanks, and weapon production sites, destroying between 70% and 80% of Syria's strategic weapons. It added that 15 naval vessels were destroyed in strikes on Minet el-Beida and Latakia. Overnight on 16 December, Israel struck radar and air defense systems in Tartous and Damascus, with the strikes on Tartous using notably heavy munitions. In the eight days since the fall of the Assad government, Israel struck Syria around 600 times. Al Jazeera correspondent Resul Serdar said that "Israel is pursuing a strategy of diminishing this country's air defence capability and also its air forces." A former rebel commander claimed that they will "need decades to rebuild a national Syrian army". A Turkish newspaper report alleged that Assad gave information about Syrian military sites to Israel in exchange for safe passage out of the country.

On 18 December, Netanyahu promised that he would not strike the area near the prison close to Damascus where American journalist Austin Tice might be held. His mother had sent him a letter two days earlier, urging him to halt Israel's airstrikes in Syria to enable the search for him to continue.

On 29 December, 11 people, mostly civilians, were killed in what is believed to be an Israeli airstrike on a former Syrian Army weapons depot in Adra, near Damascus.

==== 2025 ====
On 15 January, the Israeli Air Force struck a Hay'at Tahrir al-Sham vehicle convoy in Quneitra Governorate, killing two HTS personnel and the mayor of a local village. It was the first time Israel targeted HTS forces since the fall of the Assad regime.

On 25 February, Syria condemned Israel's occupation of Syrian lands at its national dialogue and demanded Israel's withdrawal. Hours later, Israel conducted a wave of airstrikes in Damascus and southern Syria, one day after it demanded the Syrian caretaker government demilitarize in Quneitra, Daraa, and Suwayda. At least two people were killed southwest of Damascus.

On 10 March, the IDF said that it conducted airstrikes on radar systems, detection equipment, and military sites and headquarters storing weapons and equipment in Daraa Governorate. It deployed 22 fighter jets in the strikes, which dropped over 60 munitions on dozens of sites. Syrian sources reported strikes in Izra and Jabab on military sites that belonged to the 12th Brigade and the 89th Battalion of the Syrian Army under Assad.

On 13 March, the IDF struck the home of Palestinian Islamic Jihad leader Ziyad al-Nakhalah in Dummar, which it said served as a PIJ headquarters. Although the home was empty, one person was reportedly killed in the strike.

On 17 March, the IDF said that it conducted strikes on command centers and military posts that contained weapons and vehicles belonging to the Assad regime in southern Syria. The Syrian Arab News Agency reported that two people were killed and 19 others were injured in a strike in Daraa.

On 21 March, the IDF said that it conducted airstrikes against military targets in Palmyra and the Tiyas Air Base in Homs Governorate. At least two Syrian security personnel were reportedly injured.

On 25 March, IDF killed four civilians in Kuya village in Yarmouk Basin in the western countryside of Daraa.

On 2 April, Israel carried out 11 airstrikes on Damascus and Hama.

On 3 April, Israeli forces launched airstrikes on Daraa, killing at least 11 people and Israeli warplanes dropped leaflets, warning of the presence of "gunmen" in the area.

On 30 April, the IDF said that it carried out a drone strike on the outskirts of Damascus against an armed group allegedly preparing to attack the Druze community in Suwayda. The Syrian government said that a security officer was killed and several others were injured. This came after Mowafaq Tarif, a Druze leader in Israel, pressed the Israeli government to "act" in the interests of the minority religious group.

On 2 May, the IDF launched airstrikes near the presidential palace in Damascus, warning the Syrian military to halt its offensive against the Druze. Later that day, SOHR reported at least 20 Israeli strikes on military sites in Syria. According to SANA, the strikes occurred in Damascus, Latakia, Hama, and Daraa, killing one in Harasta and injuring four others in Hama. Four Druze militants were killed in a drone strike of unclear origin on a farm in Kanaker, but SANA blamed the attack on Israel.

On 30 May, the IDF said that it conducted airstrikes on facilities storing anti-ship missiles "that posed a threat to international and Israeli maritime freedom of navigation" and surface-to-air missile components in the Latakia area. SOHR reported that military sites on the outskirts of Tartus and Latakia were hit, and SANA reported that a civilian was killed and three others were injured near Zama, Jableh District.

On 4 June, the IDF said that it had launched airstrikes on weapons belonging to Syria shortly after two projectiles were launched from Syrian territory into the Golan Heights, which Katz held al-Sharaa responsible for. The Syrian foreign ministry said the attacks caused "significant human and material losses" in southern Syria. SOHR reported "violent explosions" in southern Syria, especially Quneitra and Daraa. On 8 June, the Israeli Air Force bombed a vehicle in southern Syria claiming to have killed a Hamas member, two others were injured as well. On 16 July, the IDF bombed the entrance to the Syrian military headquarters in Damascus as a warning, citing security concerns over the Syrian army's deployment to Suwayda to restore order amid the July 2025 southern Syrian clashes. Heavier strikes targeted the Syrian military headquarters complex and caused vast damage and destruction to the main building, later strikes targeted the vicinity of the Presidential Palace in Damascus. The Syrian Ministry of Health reported at least three killed and 34 injured as a result of the attacks. Airstrikes were also conducted by Israel on the same day on multiple targets across the Suwayda and Daraa governorates, including the al-Tha'lah Military Airbase and other military targets.

On 26 August, Israeli drone strikes in the Damascus suburb of Al-Kiswah killed eight Syrian soldiers, who SANA reported had uncovered surveillance equipment while on patrol. Airstrikes in the area continued for a second day, aiming to prevent soldiers from entering the area, although Syrian troops were able to destroy some of the equipment and recover the bodies.

==== 2026 ====
In January 2026, several reports documented Israeli planes spraying chemicals on Syrian farmland and forests in the Golan Heights. Israel spraying chemicals were also reported in southern Lebanon. A sample from Lebanon showed that the chemical contained a carcinogenic classified herbicide, but in dozens of times higher concentration than normal usage.

Israel struck Syrian government military sites in southern Syria, saying the attacks were meant to protect Druze civilians in Sweida; Syria denounced the strikes as unlawful and a breach of its sovereignty.

Israel bombed the Abu al-Duhur Air Base on August 18 in eight airstrikes; there were no casualties. This marks the first attack on the airbase since the fall of Bashar al-Assad.

== Expansion of occupation ==
Before the invasion, the Purple Line formed the mutually recognized and UN approved ceasefire line between the Israeli-occupied and Syrian controlled parts of the Golan. The Quneitra Crossing was the official crossing point, used by UN personnel and Druze residents of the Golan.

Following the invasion and expanded Israeli occupation, a new line demarcating Israeli positions formed to the north. One checkpoint is north-west of Hadar, Syria, while others are at the entrances to other villages. There are also reports of checkpoints between Beqaasem, Rima, and Arnah and overlooking the Jabal Barbar mountain on the heights of Mount Hermon. Beyond checkpoints, the IDF has been constructing a 6 metres (20 ft) deep trench.

== Peace efforts ==
"Israel occupied the Golan Heights in order to protect Israel, and now they are imposing conditions in the south of Syria in order to protect the Golan Heights. So after a few years, maybe they will occupy the center of Syria in order to protect the south of Syria. They will reach Munich on that pathway[...]"

— Ahmed al-Sharaa (November 11, 2025)

Since late June 2025, Israel and Syria have been engaged in U.S.-brokered "advanced talks" aimed at ceasing hostilities and normalizing relations. The possibility of Syria joining the Abraham Accords has been raised, although Israel has insisted on retaining its control over the Golan Heights. Syrian Foreign Minister Asaad Al-Shaibani stated that Syria aspires to return to the terms of the 1974 Disengagement agreement. Among the key obstacles is Syria's demand that Israel cease operating or striking targets within Syrian territory. Israeli media have reported proposals involving Syria possibly regaining a third of the Golan Heights and annexing Sunni regions in North Lebanon and the Beqaa Valley, including the city of Tripoli, in exchange for peace with Israel.

On 20 August 2025, the official Syrian News Agency issued an official statement that Syrian Foreign Minister Asaad al-Shaibani met in Paris with an Israeli delegation "to discuss a number of issues related to strengthening stability in the region and in southern Syria." A few days later, Syrian President Ahmed al-Sharaa claimed that a security agreement with Israel was at an advanced stage, and emphasized that he would not hesitate to publicly reach a peace agreement with Israel if it benefited Syria and the region. During his visit to Washington, D.C. in November 2025, al-Sharaa stated that they are in direct negotiations with Israel, and reiterated that Israel should withdraw to their pre-December 8 borders before a final agreement can be reached.

On 5 January 2026, al-Shaibani and the head of the General Intelligence Directorate, Hussein al-Salama along with their delegation met with Israeli officials in Paris, France in order to discuss of reaching a security agreement and to defuse the tensions between the two countries. The talks were mediated and led by the Tom Barrack, the United States ambassador to Turkey. According to the Associated Press, an anonymous Syrian official stated that Syria is seeking "the withdrawal of Israeli forces to the lines prior to 8 December 2024 within the framework of a reciprocal security agreement that prioritizes full Syrian sovereignty and guarantees the prevention of any form of interference in the country’s internal affairs."

== Reactions ==
=== Involved parties ===
- Israel: In December 2024, the Israeli government said it was conducting a temporary military operation, that the United States had been notified prior to going in, and that the State of Israel "does not interfere in the domestic conflict within Syria". The IDF later said that they "may end up staying there for the foreseeable future". Yair Lapid, the Leader of the Opposition, supported the operation but criticized Netanyahu's management, saying: "I would not have gone to the border to make provocative statements to the press and put us in conflict with the new Syrian government." On 11 February 2025, Israeli Army Radio reported that the IDF's presence in Syria would be prolonged throughout 2025. On 23 February 2025, Israeli Prime Minister Benjamin Netanyahu demanded the complete demilitarization of southern Syria in the provinces of Quneitra, Daraa and Suweyda, and the withdrawal of Syrian forces from Syrian territory south of Damascus. Israeli Defense Minister Israel Katz said that Israeli forces would remain in southern Syria "for an indefinite period of time to protect our communities and thwart any threat."
- Syria: Syrian then-de facto leader Ahmed al-Sharaa, who became president in 2025, declared that Syria remains committed to the 1974 agreement and does not seek conflict with Israel or any other country. He also stated that Syria will not allow its territory to be used to attack other countries, including Israel. Syria's UN ambassador, Qusay al-Dahhak, called on the UN Security Council to compel Israel to immediately cease its attacks and withdraw to the Purple Line (ceasefire line). Al-Sharaa criticized Israel's actions, saying they cannot be justified, but also emphasized that Syria is not in a position to be drawn into a new conflict.

=== International ===
- Arab League: The Arab League condemned "attempts to expand occupation in the Golan Heights or to unilaterally nullify the 1974 disengagement agreement, actions that flagrantly violate international law."
- Egypt: Egypt condemned Israel for "exploiting Syria's current instability to expand its occupation and impose a new fait accompli, a clear violation of international law."
- France: The Foreign ministry asked Israel "to withdraw from the zone and to respect Syria's sovereignty and territorial integrity", describing the military deployment as a violation of the 1974 agreement.
- Iran: The Foreign Ministry spokesman said that "This aggression is a flagrant violation of the United Nations Charter," and "We demand an immediate response from the UN Security Council to stop the aggression and hold the occupation regime accountable."
- Iraq: The Foreign ministry issued a statement condemning the Israeli attacks on Syria, stating that "this action constitutes a blatant violation of international law and relevant international legitimacy resolutions" and called on the United Nations Security Council to "assume its responsibilities in condemning this blatant aggression and to take necessary measures to put an end to these violations that exploit the current situation in the Syrian Arab Republic."
- Jordan: Deputy Prime Minister and Foreign Minister Ayman Safadi condemned the move, stating that "it violates international law". On 26 February 2025, King Abdullah II of Jordan condemned Israeli attacks on Syria.
- Pakistan: The spokesperson for the Foreign office asserted that the move was a serious violation of international law and a dangerous development in an already volatile region. and also expressed full support for Syria's sovereignty and territorial integrity and called for immediate international action to end Israel's violations.
- Qatar: Qatar condemned the Israeli incursion, which it considered "a dangerous development; a blatant attack on the sovereignty and unity of Syria; and a flagrant violation of international law."
- Saudi Arabia: The Foreign ministry denounced Israel's activities, stating that it will "ruin Syria's chance of restoring its security."
- Turkey: President Recep Tayyip Erdoğan said that "I say it clearly that the path the Israeli government insists on and obstinately maintains is, in fact, not a true path. Security cannot be achieved by spilling more blood, by dropping more bombs on innocent civilians. This applies not only to Gaza and Palestine, but also to Syria." The foreign ministry strongly condemned Israel's entry into the buffer zone between Israel and Syria and its advance into Syrian territory. The ministry also added that Israel's actions showed an "occupation mentality", especially at a critical time when peace and stability in Syria were on the way. Turkey reiterated its support for Syria's sovereignty, political unity and territorial integrity.
- United Nations: Secretary-General Antonio Guterres's spokesman Stephane Dujarric said that Israel expanding its occupation was a violation of the 1974 agreement. On 10 December 2024, Dujarric stated that: "We're against these types of attacks. I think this is a turning point for Syria. It should not be used by its neighbors to encroach on the territory of Syria." On 20 February 2025, UN envoy Geir Pedersen stated that: "the Israelis need to withdraw".
- United Arab Emirates: The foreign ministry condemned Israel for occupying the buffer zone.
- United States: State Department Spokesman Matthew Miller said that "Every country has the right to take action against terrorist organizations and every country, I think, would be worried about a possible vacuum that could be filled by terrorist organizations on its border," stating that the Israeli incursion "is a temporary action that they have taken in response to actions by the Syrian military to withdraw from that area." U.S. Secretary of State Antony Blinken said that "The stated purpose of those actions by the Israelis is to try to make sure that the military equipment that's been abandoned by the Syrian army doesn't fall into the wrong hands -- terrorists, extremists, et cetera. But we'll be talking -- we're already talking -- to Israel, we're talking to others, about the way ahead".

== Analysis ==
In an interview to Al Jazeera, Robert Geist Pinfold – lecturer in International Peace and Security at Durham University – opined, "The Golan Heights is supposed to be a buffer zone to protect the rest of Israel. So now what Israel is doing is basically arguing that it needs a buffer zone, to protect its buffer zone, that's protecting the rest of Israel, and you have to wonder where does all this end." Residents of the region expressed similar comments, saying that they're not sure how long Israel will stay, especially if they plan to keep the borders quiet "by force." Others agreed that the future is uncertain, given that the situation has "changed completely." Former Israeli prime minister Ehud Olmert disagreed, saying that Israel has "enough problems to deal with", and questioned the idea of expanding the buffer zone further.

According to Axios, the Trump administration believes that Netanyahu bombed Syria in July 2025 because of domestic pressure from the Israeli Druze minority and other political considerations.

== See also ==
- Quneitra Governorate clashes (2012–2014)
- August 2024 Nabatieh attack
- 2024 Masyaf raid
- Syria missile strikes (September 2018)
- Syria missile strikes (August 2019)
- November 2019 Israeli missile strikes in Syria
- Syria missile strikes (January 2021)
- Israeli airstrike on the Iranian consulate in Damascus
- 2023 Israel strikes in Syria
- 2023 Damascus airstrike
- 2024 Homs airstrikes
- Druze–Syria clashes (2025–present)
- July 2025 Damascus airstrikes
- Iran–Israel conflict during the Syrian civil war
