= Madinat al-Salam (Syria) =

Madinat al-Salam مدينة السلام
- Town
- Interactive map of Madinat al-Salam
- Location of Madinat al-Salam within Syria Location of Madinat al-Salam within Quneitra Governorate, Syria
- Coordinates: 33.17°N 35.87°E
- Country: Syria
- Governorate: Quneitra Governorate
- District: Quneitra District
- Nahiyah: Khan Arnabah
- Founded: 1986

Government
  - Mayor: Imad al-Rahban

Area
  - Total: 1.9 km^{2} (0.73 sq mi)
- Elevation: 935 m (3,068 ft)

Population (2010 est.)
  - Total: 4,500
- Time zone: UTC+3 (AST)
- Website: Official page

Madinat al-Salam (Arabic: مدينة السلام, romanized: Madīnat al-Salām, "City of Peace"), also known as New Quneitra, is a town in the UNDOF Zone that is the administrative centre of the Quneitra Governorate of southern Syria.

It is located on the Damascus–Quneitra road, 12 km north of the ruined city of Quneitra and 2 km west of the town of Khan Arnabah. It is a planned town, founded and first settled in 1986, and replaced Quneitra city as the provincial centre, after Quneitra was destroyed and abandoned after the Six-Day War. It has an area of 1.9 km² and a height of 900 meters above sea level. According to the 2010 official estimate, Madinat al-Salam has a population of 4,500.

The town has a well-developed infrastructure, including 22 km of roads, banking services, government and non-government organizations, TV and radio station, cultural centre, football stadium, hospital, etc. In December 2013, the construction of 5 new faculties of the Damascus University was launched by the town council of Madinat al-Salam.

The residents of the town are mainly involved in agriculture and services. The average precipitation is 1,000 mm (39.37 in).

== History ==
Until the fall of the Assad regime, the town was named Madinat al-Baath (Arabic: مدينة البعث, romanized: Madīnat al-Bāʿth), "City of Resurrection", after the formerly ruling Syrian Ba'ath Party. After the collapse of the Assad Regime the town renamed itself "Madinat al-Salam.

=== Israeli invasion (2024-2025) ===
Following the collapse of the Ba'athist regime, Israel launched a military invasion through the Syrian ceasefire line from Israel-occupied parts of the Golan Heights on 8 December 2024, with reports of the town being captured by Israeli forces during the operation.

Israeli army withdrew at the beginning of February leaving government and courthouse buildings damaged.
