= Arab Unification Party (Lebanon) =

Arab Unification Party حزب التوحيد العربي
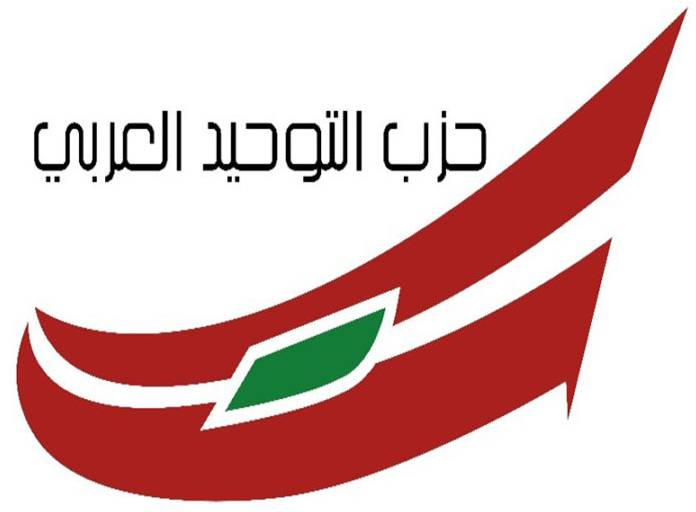
- Abbreviation: LUM
- Leader: Wiam Wahhab
- Founder: Wiam Wahhab
- Founded: May 26, 2006
- Ideology: Arab nationalism
- Political position: Centre
- National affiliation: March 8 Alliance

Tawhid Party (Arabic: حزب التوحيد العربي) is a political party in Lebanon established by former Minister of Environment and MP Weaam Wahhab on May 26, 2006. Supporters of the party are mainly Druze and it is a part of the March 8 Alliance.

The party was originally founded as the "Lebanese Union Movement".
