= Quneitra Governorate clashes (2012–2014) =

Conflict starting in November 2012

Quneitra Governorate clashes 2012–2014
- Part of the Syrian civil war
Date	2 November 2012 – 27 August 2014 (1 year, 9 months, 3 weeks and 4 days)
Location	Quneitra Governorate
Result	Syrian opposition victory: Government forces largely withdrew from the area by January 2013; Government forces retained control of the main crossing into the Israeli-occupied Golan Heights throughout 2013 and first half of 2014.; Rebels launch an offensive and take control of the main crossing into the Israeli-occupied Golan Heights on 27 August; As of November 2014, continued to control the area around Baath city in Quneitra

Belligerents
(Syrian opposition) Free Syrian Army; Islamic Front (Hamas) Aknaf Bait al-Maqdis; Al-Nusra Front; Ajnad al-Kavkaz (2014)	(Syria) Syrian Government; Arab Tawhid Party (United Nations) UNDOF

Commanders and leaders
(Syrian opposition) Abdul-Ilah al-Bashir (Syrian opposition) Majid Himoud (surrendered)	(Syria) Bashar al-Assad (Syria) Wael Nader Al-Halqi

Units involved
(Syrian opposition) Free Syrian Army; (Syrian opposition) Quneitra Military Council; Katiba Ahrar Haḍr; Alwiya al-Furqan; (Syrian opposition) Syrian Revolutionaries Front; Fallujah-Houran Brigade; Saraya al-Jihad; Ahl Assalaf Youth; Jund al-Rahman Brigades; Mujahideen al-Sham Movement.; (Syrian opposition) Al-Mutasim Battalion (surrendered); Islamic Front; Ahrar ash-Sham; Ajnad al-Kavkaz; Ahrar al-Sharkas (Became Jamaat Jund al-Qawqaz); Jamaat Jund al-Qawqaz	Syrian Armed Forces; Syrian Army; 7th Mechanized Division; 68th Mechanized Brigade; 78th Armoured Brigade; National Defense Forces; Syrian Air Force

Strength
Unknown	Unknown

Casualties and losses
220+ killed See casualties	82+ killed See casualties
- (Syria) At least 2+ Syrian civilians killed in Syrian gov-t bombings 8 Syrian civilians killed by Israeli Army bombardment.; (Israel) 8 Israeli soldiers injured (Israel) 1 Israeli civilian killed and three injured; 2 unidentified militants killed by Israeli military

The 2012–2014 Quneitra Governorate clashes began in early November 2012, when the Syrian Army began engaging with rebels in several towns and villages of the Quneitra Governorate. The clashes quickly intensified and extended into the United Nations-monitored demilitarized zone along the ceasefire line with the Israeli-controlled Golan Heights, which Israel considers as a sensitive security area.

The fighting came to international attention when in March 2013, Syrian rebels took hostage 21 Filipino UN personnel, who had been a part of the UN Disengagement Observer Force in the neutral buffer zone between Syria and Israel. According to UN official they were taken hostage near Observation Post 58, which had sustained damage and was evacuated the previous weekend, following heavy combat in close proximity at Al Jamla. The UN personnel were later released with Jordanian mediation.

Israel was briefly involved in the fighting in several incidents, such as on 11 November 2012, when mortar shells from Syria landed near an Israeli military outpost in the Israeli-occupied Golan Heights, responding by firing "warning shots" into Syria. This accounted for the first direct cross-border incidents between the two countries since the Yom Kippur War nearly forty years prior. Other occasions of short cross-border fire exchanges followed in early 2013 and in March 2014, with several wounded Israeli soldiers reported in each incident and one Israeli civilian killed.

The clashes in the governorate were eclipsed by the 2014 Quneitra offensive, launched by rebels on late August 2014, resulting in take-over of much of the governorate by mid-September.

== Background ==
Quneitra Governorate came into its modern shape in 1946, with Syrian independence from French Mandatory rule. The borders of the governorate were extended during the 1948 War with Israel, as Syria occupied parts of the Jordan and Huleh Valleys, adjacent to the Sea of Galilee. During the Six-Day War in 1967, Israel captured the Western Golan Heights from Syria, effectively reduced Syrian-controlled Quneitra part to one third of its size. After a failed attempt to recapture the region in the Yom Kippur War of 1973, Syria and Israel have remained in a shaky truce with a United Nations-monitored demilitarized zone (DMZ) separating the countries. Many countries have condemned Israel's occupation of the Golan Heights, especially their unilateral annexation of the area in 1981 and subsequent settlement construction.

The border remained quiet for nearly four decades until the outbreak of the Arab Spring. During the 2011 Israeli border demonstrations, Palestinian protesters approached the border and were subsequently fired upon by Israeli forces. Four demonstrators were killed and dozens were injured. Additionally, Israeli soldiers were injured when protesters attempted to cross into the Druze town of Majdal Shams located on the Israeli-occupied side of the ceasefire line. As the Syrian civil war progressed, border clashes began to escalate, with spillover conflicts in Lebanon and Turkey prompting fears of an escalation to a wider regional conflict.

There were some concerns of civil unrest on the Israeli side of the border as well, particularly among the Golan Druze. The Druze population of the Israeli-occupied portion of Golan Heights numbers around 20,000 individuals, with majority of them still holding Syrian citizenship. Prior to the war, the Golan Druze were overwhelmingly in support of the government of Bashar al-Assad, as his government has long been staunchly supportive of their interests and opposition to Israeli rule. Many of them were able to conduct business across the border in Syria as a result of agreements between the Syrian and Israeli governments. As the civil war deepened, however, a minority of Golan Druze began to voice opposition to the Assad government. According to local sources, perhaps 22 individuals had crossed the border into Syria to fight for the rebels by late September 2012. Public support for the Syrian government nevertheless remains high, while rumours of pro-Assad spies intimidate potential dissenters fearful of being banned from cross-border trade.

== Involved actors in Quneitra region ==
=== Baathist Syria and allies ===
The Katiba Ahrar Haḍr (Battalion of the Free Men of Haḍr), referring to the Druze village of Haḍr in the Jabal al-Sheikh region, formed on 28 January 2013 in response to disillusionment with government policies of conscription into the Syrian Army as well as apparent extortionist practices on the part of the People's Committees set up to coordinate the activities of Druze militias with the Syrian Army. In the group's formation video, the battalion declares affiliation with the FSA-banner Military Council of the Quneitra and Golan region.

=== Syrian opposition ===
Brigadier General Abdul-Ilah al-Bashir, the leader of the Quneitra Military Council, a Syrian rebel coalition affiliated with the Free Syrian Army, was appointed the Chief-of-Staff of the FSA's Supreme Military Council (SMC) on 16 February 2014. A rebel offensive in May 2014 to capture the town of Qahtaniya and the Riwadi and Hamidyya checkpoints involved the Syrian Revolutionaries Front (SRF), Saraya al-Jihad, Bait al-Maqdis Group, Ahl Assalaf Youth, Jund al-Rahman Brigades and Mujahideen al-Sham Movement. The Furqan Brigade (al Quneitra) is a branch of the Damascus-based Islamist Furqan Brigade, operating in the southwest of Syria near the Israeli-occupied Golan Heights The Islamic Front is a coalition of several rebel groups, including Ahrar al Sham, which is linked to al Qaeda. The Syrian Revolutionaries Front (SRF) is an alliance formed in December 2013 by the Free Syrian Army as a response to the merger of Islamist Syrian rebels into the Islamic Front. It assisted the Islamic Front and Al Nusrah in 'liberating' ar-Rawadia and Humaydia in the Quneitra countryside in September 2014.

=== Mujahedeen ===
In August 2014, it was reported that Jabhat al-Nusra, along with Fallujah-Houran Brigade, Syria Revolutionaries Front, Saraya al-Jihad, Bayt al-Maqdis and Ahrar al-Sham, began a battle called "the real promise" to seize control of the devastated city of Quneitra and the crossing connecting it with the Golan Heights. The source was surprised by the participation of Islamic factions in the battle, since they were absent for months from the fighting in the southern region, especially in Daraa, before simultaneously deciding to participate alongside the Syria Revolutionaries Front, its most bitter enemy.

=== Others ===
Other rebel factions in Quneitra included: Ansar al-Huda; Fursan al-Ababil; Jabhat Ansar al-Islam; Youth of Sunnah Brigade, and probably other local groups.

== Timeline ==
=== 2012 ===
On 18 July 2012, the Free Syrian Army captured Jubata al-Khashab and started operations against the Syrian Army from it. On 2 November 2012, Syrian Army tanks crossed into the UN-administered demilitarized zone and clashed with rebels near the village of Beer Ajam. During the clashes, stray bullets hit an Israeli patrol in the area. Israel responded on 5 November by filing a complaint with the United Nations Security Council, claiming Syria violated the 1974 Agreement on Disengagement signed following the Yom Kippur War. The terms of the 1974 armistice prevent the Syrian military from conducting operations within the DMZ. Sources within the Israeli military cite these restrictions as a potential reason why the armed opposition drew the Syrian Army into combat in the area.

By 10 November, at least 30 Syrian rebels and soldiers had been killed in the fighting, according to the Syrian Observatory for Human Rights. Clashes were reportedly ongoing in and around the villages of Bariqa, Beer Ajam and al-Hersh. Two days later, Syrian Government forces began shelling opposition positions in the village of Bariqa near the border with Israel. A foreign journalist reported seeing the fighting from the Israeli side of the border, with government forces driving rebels toward the border with heavy artillery. About thirty minutes later, a shell from Syria landed near Tel Hazeka in the Golan Heights. Israel retaliated by shelling Syrian government positions with Merkava tanks, resulting in "direct hits" on the sources of the fire. According to Israeli Army Radio, the Assad government requested that Israel stop firing, though it was not clear if the Israeli shelling caused any casualties.

By 13 November, a force of at least 200 rebels had captured the Syrian-side villages of Beer Ajam and Bariqa. Rebels were reportedly in control of the areas to the north and south of Quneitra. The following day, Israeli defense minister Ehud Barak claimed that rebels were in control of most of the villages on the eastern slopes of the Golan Heights, and that the Syrian Army had been unable to enter them.

On 28 December, SOHR reported that six rebels, including a commander, and five government soldiers were killed in combat in the villages of Ruwayhinah and Zubaydah. The following day, SOHR reported that two rebels died of their wounds incurred in earlier combat with government forces in the area.

=== 2013 ===
On 6 March, 21 UN personnel were taken hostage by Syrian rebels in the neutral zone. They were later released with Jordanian mediation.

On 24 March, the IDF fired a guided missile at a Syrian machine gun nest after Israeli troops were shot at twice in the Golan Heights. No Israeli soldiers were hurt in the shooting, during which army vehicles were hit.

On 7 May, 18 rebel fighters were reported killed in heavy fighting in the province.

On 21 May, there was an exchange of fire between Syria and Israel in the Golan Heights. An Israeli vehicle was hit by Syrian fire with the Israeli's retaliating and destroying the source of the attack.

Early on 6 June, rebels attacked and temporarily captured a Golan border crossing. However, the same day, government forces counter-attacked with tanks and armoured personnel carriers, recapturing the crossing. Al Jazeera's Sue Turton, reporting from the Golan Heights, said that this marked a significant point in the crisis. Rebels also attacked a military checkpoint in the largely destroyed and abandoned city of Quneitra. A shell landed in an UN base nearby as a result of Government-Rebel fire-exchanges. An Austrian defense ministry official confirmed to the Associated Press that rebel troops captured the crossing point and that UN forces have withdrawn from the area.

On 16 July, rebel fighters retreated from the al-Qahtaniya village because of heavy bombardment by the army on the village after violent clashes.

=== 2014 ===
On 31 January 2014, rebels captured al-Susiyah city and 5 other villages. A week later, rebels managed to stop an army convoy that was heading to Al-Dwaieh village.

On 16 February, Abdel al-Ilah al-Bachir, chief of the FSA Military Council in Quneitra, was appointed chief of staff of the Free Syrian Army.

On 18 February, the Army launched a surprise offensive during the morning using tanks and air strikes against the villages of al-Hajjeh, al-Dawayeh al-Kubra, al-Sughra, Bir Ajam and al-Buraika in the central and southern parts of al-Quneitra. 4 days later, the Army and National Defense Force captured the areas of Rasm al-Hour and Rasm al Sayd, south of the town of Quneitra. SOHR confirmed troops were on the offensive, adding that the air force was taking part in the attack. Two days later, rebels managed to 'infiltrate' the Abu-Dhiab and Khalil tank platoons in Tal-Al-Jabieh area, seizing various weapons and two tanks. It was also reported that about 40 regular army soldiers were killed and a number of others captured. Al-Arabiya reported this as a major advance of FSA in Quneitra governorate. On 26 February, the Army dispatched reinforcements to the province, after recent gains by rebels there. It was also reported that rebels declared their control of over 80% of the Golan countryside through coordination committees. They also announced a new offensive against the bases in Quneitra, especially Brigade 61.

On 1 March, two rockets were fired on an Israeli post on Mount Hermon, in what is widely believed to be a retaliation for an Israeli airstrike on a Hezbollah target near the Lebanese-Syrian border. On 18 March, an Israeli jeep traveling on the Golan Heights near the Syrian border came under attack, when an explosive device was detonated in its vicinity. One soldier was seriously wounded. Another three soldiers sustained light-to-moderate injuries. IDF 155 Artillery battery returned fire across the border following the incident and shot several shells on a Syrian outpost. Israel responded by carrying out multiple airstrikes against Syrian targets, including a military headquarters, artillery batteries and a training base of the Syrian army. The Syrian army reported that the Israeli airstrikes killed one Syrian soldier and wounded seven. On 28 March, Israeli soldiers opened fire on two gunmen seen attempting to sabotage the border fence with Syria on the Golan Heights. IDF said both armed suspects were struck by the gunfire.

On 7 April, rebels announced the start of a new offensive in the Tell Ahmar area to capture two strategic hills. They managed to advance while damaging a tank according to the SOHR. The rebels captured one of the strategic hills later that day. Rebels also captured the village of Tulul al-Humur after besieging it for weeks.

On 8 May, rebels launched a military operation against al-Qahtania, al-Hamedia, Quneitra Crossing and the al-Rawadi checkpoint in Quneitra province.

On 23 June, the IDF launched several airstrikes targeting government troops in retaliation for an attack the day before that killed an Israeli teenager from the Arab village of Arraba. Four soldiers were killed and nine injured during the strikes. On 15 July 2014, the IDF bombarded the city of Quneitra, killing at least 4 persons. It also bombarded the Brigade 90 base.

== Aftermath ==
On 27 August, rebels took control of the Quneitra Crossing between Syria and the Israeli-occupied Golan Heights. At least 20 soldiers and 14 rebels were killed during the battle. Fighting in the area continued in towns northeast of the crossing, while the IDF shelled two Syrian army positions in retaliation of six mortar shells that fell in the Israeli-occupied Golan Heights and the wounding of an Israeli officer. The Al-Nusra Front, Ahrar ash-Sham and other rebel groups (including moderate groups) participated in the fighting. The next day, fighters from the Nusra front captured 44-45 U.N. peacekeepers and surrounded 75 others, resulting in a gun fight that lasted over 7 hours. A group of 35 U.N. soldiers were successfully escorted out of the UN encampment in Breiqa by their colleagues. Rebels tried to breach the Rwihana U.N. encampment, but the attack was repelled by the U.N. defenders with support from the Syrian Army. The remaining 40 peacekeepers were eventually evacuated during the night of 29 August, after a ceasefire was established.

== Reactions ==
=== Iran ===
Observers in the Arab world have been warning for years about growing evidence of Iranian expansionism. Tehran has invested huge resources in making Syria a Shiite state. Dr. Shimon Shapira, a retired brigadier general of the Israel Defense Forces (IDF), has written a paper unambiguously titled "Iran's Plans to Take Over Syria," which emphasizes comments made by Mehdi Taaib, the head of Ayatollah Ali Khamenei's think tank, that Syria is "35th district of Iran and it has greater strategic importance for Iran than Khuzestan [an Arab-populated district inside Iran]." Iran is also recruiting Shiite forces from various countries for fighting in Syria. As Syria disintegrates into a patchwork of areas, Iran is said to aim to have a network of militias in place inside Syria to protect its vital interests, regardless of what happens to Assad. Qasem Suleimani, the commander of the Quds Force of the Revolutionary Guard Corps, is reported to have prepared an operational plan named after him based upon the establishment of a 150,000-man force for Syria, the majority of whom will come from Iran, Iraq, and a smaller number from Hizbullah and the Gulf states. He has been the spearhead of Iranian military activism in the Middle East. In January 2012, he declared that the Islamic Republic controlled "one way or another" Iraq and South Lebanon. In March 2014, an article in the Guardian estimated the numbers of Shia fighters in Syria range between 8,000 and 15,000. The Kurdish head of Iraq's parliamentary security and defence committee said in March 2015 there were around 30,000 Iranians fighting ISIL in Iraq (and Syria?). The same month, it was reported elsewhere that Iran's Islamic Revolutionary Guard Corps has mobilized roughly 70,000 fighters in Syria since the war began to prop up Assad's army which had been reduced to less than half through casualties, desertions and draft dodging and that there are between 5,000-10,000 Hezbollah fighters in Syria. This would be around 10% of the estimated 70,000 well trained soldiers of Hezbollah. Refugee Afghan Shiite jihadists living in Iran are said to have provided the largest supply of non-Arab foreigners to the Syrian battlefield. Meanwhile, a U.S. intelligence official in February 2015 estimated around 20,000 foreign fighters had joined jihadist organizations in Syria and Iraq.

However, the Fair Observer site, while noting that the Revolutionary Guards are administratively embedded in the most critical Syrian government agencies reflecting a commissar-type pattern, states their "battle management strategy in Syria appears to be premised on a light Iranian footprint on the ground and the use of proxy militias as force multipliers to manage the battle space. This juncture of the Syrian war is characterized by the Revolutionary Guard managing the battle space by liaising across hundreds of Shiite, Alawite and Ismaili (and some allied Christian) militias characterized by loyalty ultimately to the Revolutionary Guard which facilitates their funding either directly or through surrogates such as the Syrian government. The Washington Institute produced in 2015 a lengthy and detailed analysis of Iran and Hezbollah's strategy in developing Syrian militias which alleges that along with Hezbollah, refugee Iraqi Shiite jihadists have formed the core Iranian proxy units sent to Syria, and that attached advisors from Hezbollah and IRGC influenced the groups' religious and ideological development. This has altered the conflict narrative from the Assad line emphasizing a secular "fight against terrorists". Hezbollah has assumed a lead role in the February 2015 offensive in the south. Many Shia militiamen from Iraq who had been fighting alongside Assad's forces started to return last autumn to neighboring Iraq to assist in the pushback against the Sunni militants of Islamic State, also known as ISIL who seized a swath of western and northern Iraq in the summer. Top Iranian commanders from Iran's Revolutionary Guards, including the commander of its Quds Force Qasem Soleimani, who were frequently in Syria to help direct military tactics are now more often in Iraq, say Baghdad-based Western diplomats. The Iranian quest to achieve regional dominance through its proxies has thus been aided by the return from Syria of experienced Iraqi fighters whose organizations have thus expanded from having bases in Syria alone to also having ones in Iraq.

OSNet reported that the Syrian government/Hezbollah-led drive towards Quneitra via Tel Harra had a number of unique features. For the first time in the Syrian theatre, the forces were commanded in full by an Iranian operations room. Its goal reached beyond ensuring the survival of the Syrian government. Rather, they aimed to make Quneitra the seat of their forward command and bring Iranian Revolutionary Guards (IRGC) within sight and firing range of Israeli military forces. At a 7 May 2013 meeting with Iranian foreign minister Ali Akbar Salehi, Syrian President Bashar Al-Assad announced, "The Golan will become a front of resistance." Tel al-Hara, at 3500 feet the tallest peak in the Golan range, and overlooking Israel's outposts, is important because it was formerly a Syrian fortress with tens of square kilometers of bunkers, funnels and defensive positions. Also perched there were advanced Russian radar stations, which kept track of Israel military and air force movements across the border. These stations were connected to the Middle East intelligence networks of the IRGC and kept Tehran abreast of Israeli military movements and deployments." According to Christians for Israel International, Iran's aim in deploying in the Golan Heights was to deter Israel from acting against its nuclear program, defend Syria as part of the resistance axis, and establish an active front for anti-Israel terror attacks in the Golan and even to liberate the Israeli-occupied Golan. Hezbollah's strategy could also be termed defensive in that they fear the possibility that Israel will close in on it from Mount Dov to the west, using the Al-Nusra Front and moderate opposition forces to lay siege to southern Lebanon, thus causing difficulties for the organization's activities there. In addition, and perhaps more importantly, Hezbollah and Assad fear that Israel is carving out a path to Damascus via Quneitra and Daraa — one that will allow it easy access to the Syrian capital in the event of war. Hezbollah and Iran have asked the Palestinian resistance movements, such as Hamas's Al-Qassam Brigades and the many factions of Palestinians living in refugee camps in Lebanon and Syria, to join their front against Israel.

=== Israel ===
With the breakdown of the status quo on the Golan Heights front, which had been quiet since the Separation of Forces Agreement of 1974, Israel's eyes have been anxiously focused on developments in Quneitra. Amos Yadlin, a former senior Israeli intelligence officer and now a member of the opposition Zionist Union party, told the Wall Street Journal: "There is no doubt that Hezbollah and Iran are the major threat to Israel, much more than the radical Sunni Islamists, who are also an enemy." A prominent Middle East researcher stated that Israel established contacts with members of the Syrian opposition abroad during the second half of 2012 and the idea of a buffer zone emerged during secret meetings in Amman in early 2013.

Importantly, Israel explicitly threatened to fire on any Syrian government armour which enters the demilitarized zone in Quneitra, which would be a breach of the May 1974 disengagement agreement between the two countries. Sedqi al-Maqet, a Syrian Druze, pro-Assad activist who lives in the Israeli occupied Golan was interdicted in February 2014 after reporting online he had witnessed meetings between Israeli armed forces in the Golan and what he termed terrorists active in the Syrian-controlled sector of the Golan.

== Casualties ==
=== Syrian Arab Army and allies ===
- 53 soldiers and officials killed on 1 February 2013 by rebels.
- 24 Syrian soldiers killed and 7 injured by Israeli military.
- 5 Arab Tawhid Party militants killed in the town of Arna in Mount Hermon on 4 November 2013.

=== Syrian rebels ===
At least 220 rebels killed: Claims by Hezbollah and the Iranian News agency FARS No significant events took place on either date and neither figure is confirmed by any credible verifiable source.

- 20 killed on 27.03.14 (Hezbollah claim)
- 200+ killed 5 May 2014

=== Civilians ===
11+ civilians killed (including 1 foreign):

- 2+ Syrian civilians killed in Syrian gov-t bombings
- 8 Syrian civilians killed by Israeli Army bombardment.
- 1 Israeli civilian killed and three injured in spillover.

== See also ==
- 2012 Syrian–Turkish border clashes
- Cities and towns during the Syrian Civil War
- 2014 Daraa offensive
- 2015 Southern Syria offensive
- 2018 Southern Syria offensive
- Quneitra Governorate clashes (2024)
