= Jubata al-Khashab =

Jubata al-Khashab جباتا الخشب
- Town
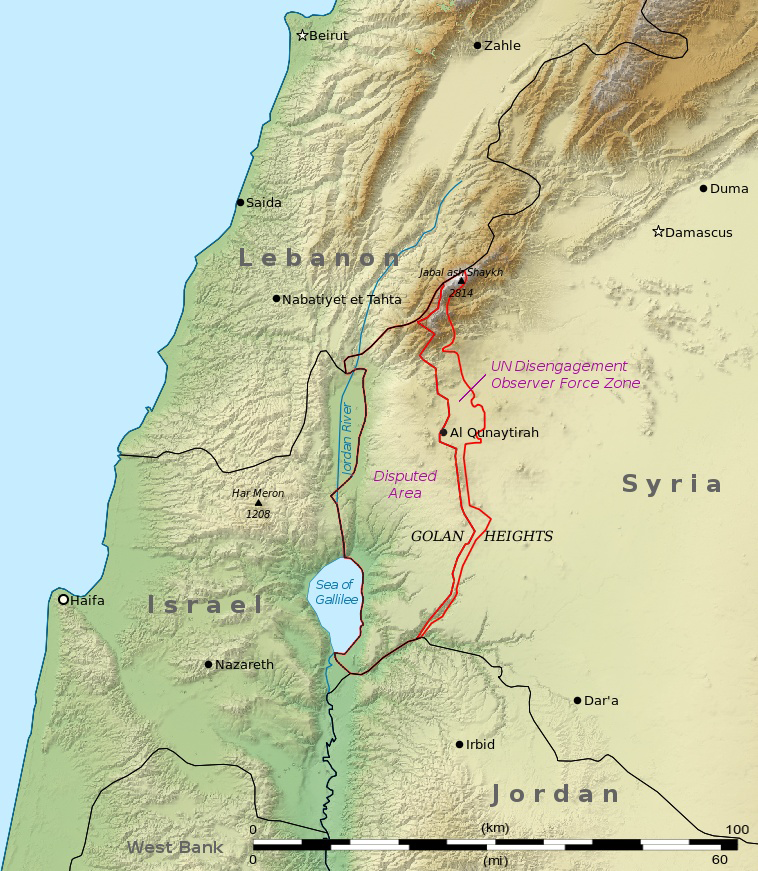
- Location within Syria Location within Golan Heights
- Coordinates: 33°13′32″N 35°49′54″E
- Grid position: 231/273 PAL
- Country: Syria
- Governorate: Quneitra
- District: Quneitra
- Subdistrict: Khan Arnabah
- Occupation: Israel

Population (2004 census)
  - Total: 3,493
- Time zone: UTC+2 (EET)
  - Summer (DST): UTC+3 (EEST)

Jubata al-Khashab (Arabic: جباتا الخشب) is a town in southern Syria, administratively part of the Quneitra Governorate (Golan Heights), in the portion of the province under the United Nations Disengagement Observer Force Zone. According to the Syria Central Bureau of Statistics, Jubata al-Khashab had a population of 3,493 in the 2004 census. Its inhabitants are predominantly Sunni Muslims, although the population has decreased drastically due to the exodus of residents fleeing the violence of the Syrian Civil War.

On 13 September 2015, under the Assad regime, Syrian army units killed and injured a number of militants and destroyed many of their hideouts in direct strikes targeting their gatherings in the village.

During the Israeli invasion of Syria, the Israel Defense Forces created military outposts and military bases near the town.

== Deforestation by Israel ==
The Israeli army has carried out frequent bulldozing and excavation operations in the Jabbata al-Khashab Nature Reserve, which is the only one in the area, due to claims of security concerns. During an operation began on October 18, 2025, more than 20 dunams of forested land were leveled, most of the trees believed to be hundreds of years old.
