= Jaish al-Haramoun =

- Logo of Jaish al-Haramoun
- Dates active: 15 June 2015- September 2015
- Groups: Ahrar ash-Sham; Liwa Fursan al-Sunna; Christ Brigade; Liwa Jabal al-Sheikh; Liwa Osama bin Zaid; Liwa Omar Ibn al-Khattab; Liwa Sayad al-Usud; Harakat Shuhada al-Sham; Al-Nusra Front
- Active regions: Quneitra, Syria; Rif Dimashq, Syria
- Wars: the Syrian Civil War

Jaish al-Haramoun was an operations room of Syrian rebel factions that operated in the eastern Quneitra and Rif Dimashq governorates of Syria.

After the loss at the Battle of Zabadani (2015) the operations rooms became largely defunct.

== Members ==
- Ahrar ash-Sham
- al-Nusra Front
- Liwa Fursan al-Sunna
- Liwa Jabal al-Sheikh
- Liwa Osama bin Zaid
- Liwa Omar ibn al-Khattab
- Liwa Sayad al-Usud
- Harakat Shuhada al-Sham

== See also ==
- List of armed groups in the Syrian Civil War
