= Khan Arnabah =

Town in southern Syria

Khan Arnabah: خان أرنبة (Arabic)
- Town
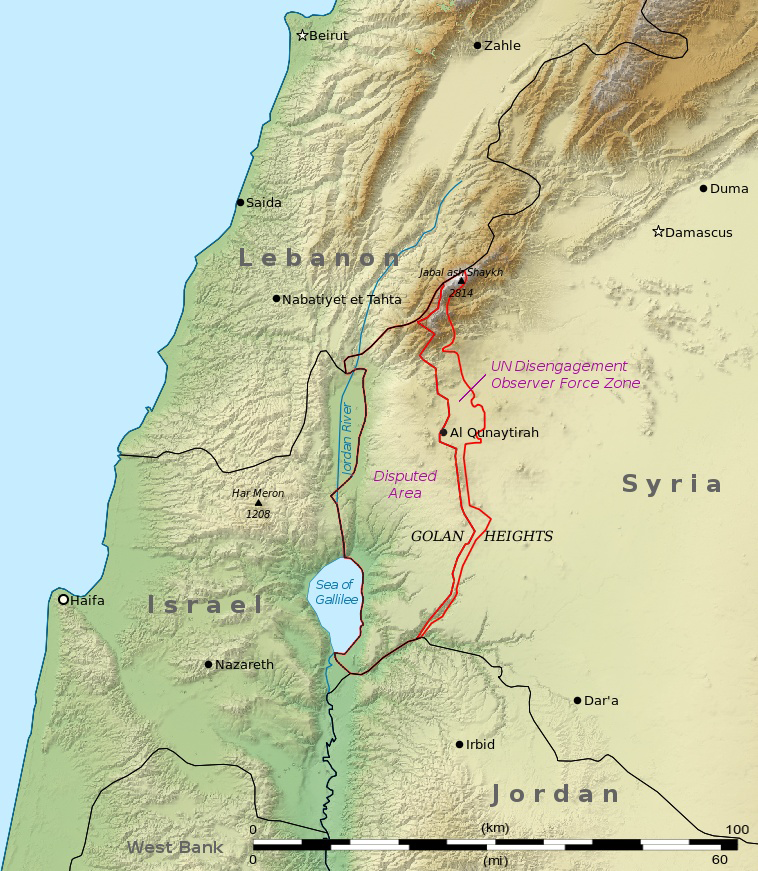
- Location within Golan Heights
- Coordinates: 33.18°N 35.89°E
- Grid position: 164/287
- Country: Syria
- Governorate: Quneitra
- District: Quneitra
- Subdistrict: Khan Arnabah
- Control: Israel

Population (2004 census)
  - Total: 7,375
- Time zone: UTC+2 (EET)
  - Summer (DST): UTC+3 (EEST)

Khan Arnabah (Note: Arabic: خان أرنبة; Hebrew: חאן ארנבה, romanized: chan arnava) also spelt Khan Arnabeh and historically known as al-Uraynba, is a town in southwestern Syria, administratively part of the Quneitra Governorate (Golan Heights), in the portion of the province under Israeli control. The town is located just outside the United Nations Disengagement Observer Force Zone. Nearby localities include Sa'sa' to the northeast, Quneitra to the southwest, Jubata al-Khashab to the northwest, as well as the Circassian villages of Beer Ajam and Bariqa to the south. According to the Syria Central Bureau of Statistics, Khan Arnabah had a population of 7,375 at the 2004 census. The town is also the administrative centre of the Khan Arnabah nahiyah, which is made up of 19 towns having a combined population of 42,980. Its inhabitants are predominantly Sunni Muslims.

== History ==
Archaeological remains in the town include several findings from the Roman and Byzantine periods, such as fragments of a deity statue, likely representing Nike.

The town features a medieval caravanserai, likely dating from the Mamluk period, which served as a roadside inn along the route from Damascus to the Daughters of Jacob Bridge. The caravanserai was likely built during the first half of the 14th century. An inscription with information about its founding had been affixed on the lintel of its gate but was lost during repair work on the site in the early 20th century.

During the 2024 Israeli invasion of Syria that started after the fall of the Ba'athist regime, the town was occupied by Israeli forces on 8 December.

== Bibliography ==
- Cytryn-Silverman, Katia (2016). The Road Inns (Khāns) in Bilād al-Shām. Oxford: BAR Publishing. ISBN 9781407336718.
