= Kafr Nasij =

Kafr Nasij كفر ناسج
- Village
- Location within Syria
- Coordinates: 33°9′5″N 36°2′21″E
- Grid position: 247/284 PAL
- Country: Syria
- Governorate: Daraa
- District: Al-Sanamayn
- Subdistrict: Ghabaghib

Population (2004)
  - Total: 2,381
- Time zone: UTC+3 (AST)

Kafr Nasij (Arabic: كفر ناسج, also spelled Kafar Nasej) is a village in the al-Sanamayn District of the Daraa Governorate in southern Syria. Nearby localities include al-Tiha to the west, Aqraba and al-Harra to the southwest, Zimrin to the south, Kafr Shams to the southeast, Deir al-Adas to the east and Kanakir to the north. In the 2004 census by the Central Bureau of Statistics (CBS), Kafr Nasij had a population of 2,381.

== History ==
Seven ancient basalt houses were documented in Kafr Nasij during a 1970s archaeological survey. Likely built as residences for wealthy individuals, these structures are believed to date back to the Roman period, around the 2nd and 3rd centuries CE, with some still standing and occupied at the time of the 1970s survey.

A Ghassanid monastery of stylites was located in Kafr Nasij which was part of Batanea during the Byzantine era (4th-7th centuries).

=== Ottoman era ===
In 1596 Kafr Nasij appeared in the Ottoman tax registers being in the nahiya of Jaydur, part of Hauran Sanjak. It had an entirely Muslim population consisting of 17 households and 7 bachelors. They paid a fixed tax-rate of 40% on agricultural products, including wheat, barley, summer crops, goats, bee-hives and water mills; in addition to occasional revenues; a total of 17,800 akçe.

In 1838, Kefr Nasij was noted as a village in the el-Jeidur district.

=== Civil war ===
During the ongoing Syrian Civil War which began in 2011, pro-government media reported that five opposition rebels were killed and 13 others arrested during a clash with Syrian security forces.

== Climate ==
In Kafr Nasij, there is a Mediterranean climate. Rainfall is higher in winter than in summer. The Köppen-Geiger climate classification is Csa. The average annual temperature in Kafr Nasij is 16.1 °C (61.0 °F). About 386 mm (15.20 in) of precipitation falls annually.

Climate data for Kafr Nasij
Month	Jan	Feb	Mar	Apr	May	Jun	Jul	Aug	Sep	Oct	Nov	Dec	Year
Mean daily maximum °C (°F)	10.7 (51.3)	12.4 (54.3)	16.0 (60.8)	20.5 (68.9)	26.1 (79.0)	30.0 (86.0)	31.2 (88.2)	31.8 (89.2)	29.3 (84.7)	25.8 (78.4)	19.2 (66.6)	13.3 (55.9)	22.2 (71.9)
Mean daily minimum °C (°F)	2.5 (36.5)	2.9 (37.2)	5.4 (41.7)	8.5 (47.3)	12.2 (54.0)	15.3 (59.5)	17.0 (62.6)	17.3 (63.1)	15.1 (59.2)	12.3 (54.1)	8.0 (46.4)	4.6 (40.3)	10.1 (50.2)
Average precipitation mm (inches)	96 (3.8)	72 (2.8)	51 (2.0)	18 (0.7)	11 (0.4)	0 (0)	0 (0)	0 (0)	0 (0)	11 (0.4)	42 (1.7)	85 (3.3)	386 (15.2)
Source: Climate-Data.org, Climate data

== Bibliography ==
- Hütteroth, W.-D.; Abdulfattah, K. (1977). Historical Geography of Palestine, Transjordan and Southern Syria in the Late 16th Century. Erlanger Geographische Arbeiten, Sonderband 5. Erlangen, Germany: Vorstand der Fränkischen Geographischen Gesellschaft. ISBN 3-920405-41-2.
- Robinson, E.; Smith, E. (1841). Biblical Researches in Palestine, Mount Sinai and Arabia Petraea: A Journal of Travels in the year 1838. Vol. 3. Boston: Crocker & Brewster.
- Trimingham, John Spencer (1979). Christianity among the Arabs in pre-Islamic times. Longman. ISBN 0582780810.
