= Aqraba, Syria =

Aqraba عقربا
- Village
- Location within Syria
- Coordinates: 33°6′35″N 36°0′28″E
- Grid position: 244/279 PAL
- Country: Syria
- Governorate: Daraa
- District: Al-Sanamayn
- Subdistrict: Ghabaghib
- Elevation: 747 m (2,451 ft)

Population (2004)
  - Total: 4,413
- Time zone: UTC+3 (AST)

Aqraba (Arabic: عقربا; transliteration: ʿAqrabāʾ, also spelled Akraba or Aqrabah) is a village in southern Syria, administratively part of the al-Sanamayn District of the Daraa Governorate. In the 2004 census by the Central Bureau of Statistics (CBS), Aqraba had a population of 4,413.

== Geography ==
Aqraba is situated in the Jaydur area of the Hauran region and is immediately east of the Golan Heights. It is located 50 kilometers southwest of Damascus, 15 kilometers north of Jasim, 4 kilometers north of al-Harra and Tel al-Hara and 10 kilometers southeast of Kafr Shams. Nearby places include Naba al-Sakher to the east, Masharah to the northeast, al-Mal and al-Tiha to the north and Kafr Nasij to the northeast.

== History ==
The village is recorded as Akrabēs (Ἀκραβῆς) in the Diocletianic boundary stones corpus, dated to c. 300 CE.

=== Byzantine period ===
In the 6th century, Aqraba served as a residence of the Ghassanid Arab princes, who ruled the Arabia and Palaestina Secunda provinces on behalf of the Byzantine Empire. An inscription in the village mentions a certain "Nuʾmān", which probably refers to a Ghassanid prince of that name. The 6th-century Arabic poets al-Nabigha and Hassan ibn Thabit both mention the Ghassanid presence in Aqraba. The village contained two monasteries dating from the Ghassanid period. The village was later mentioned by the 13th-century Syrian geographer Yaqut al-Hamawi, who noted it belonged to the Jawlan district of Damascus and that "Ghassanid kings dwelt here of old".

=== Ottoman period ===
In 1596 Aqraba appeared in the Ottoman tax registers, situated in the nahiya of Jaydur, part of Hauran Sanjak. It had an entirely Muslim population consisting of 27 households and 13 bachelors. They paid a fixed tax-rate of 25% on agricultural products, mostly wheat, but also some on barley and summer crops; in addition to occasional revenues; a total of 16,600 akçe.

== Bibliography ==
- Buhl, Frants (1986). "ʿAkrabāʾ". The Encyclopedia of Islam, New Edition, Volume I: A–B. Leiden and New York: BRILL. p. 344. ISBN 90-04-08114-3.
- Hütteroth, W.-D.; Abdulfattah, K. (1977). Historical Geography of Palestine, Transjordan and Southern Syria in the Late 16th Century. Erlanger Geographische Arbeiten, Sonderband 5. Erlangen, Germany: Vorstand der Fränkischen Geographischen Gesellschaft. ISBN 3-920405-41-2.
- Le Strange, G. (1890). Palestine Under the Moslems: A Description of Syria and the Holy Land from A.D. 650 to 1500. Committee of the Palestine Exploration Fund.
- Ma'oz, Zvi Uri (2008). The Ghassānids and the Fall of the Golan Synagogues. Archaostyle.
- Shahid, I. (2002). Byzantium and the Arabs in the Sixth Century: pt. 1, Toponymy, Monuments, Historical Geography, and Frontier Studies. Dumbarton Oaks Research Library and Collection. ISBN 0884022145.
