= 2014 Quneitra offensive =

Military operation

Quneitra offensive
- Part of the Syrian Civil War
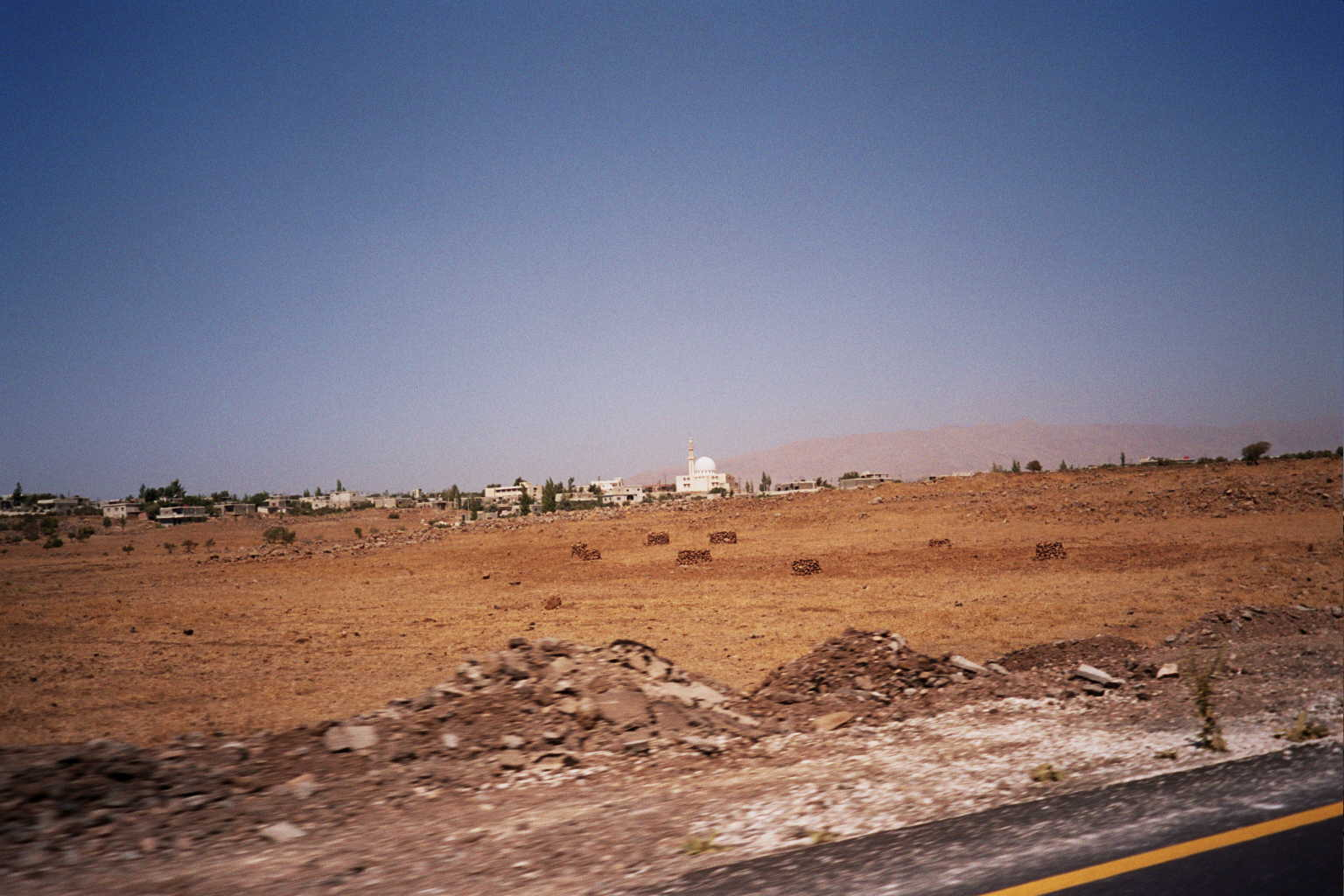
- Road from Quneitra to Damascus in the offensive zone (photo taken in 2005)
Date	27 August – 23 September 2014 (3 weeks and 6 days)
Location	Quneitra Governorate and Daraa Governorate, Syria
Result	Rebel victory: Rebels take control of about 80 percent of towns and villages in Quneitra province and seize the Syrian-controlled side of the Golan.; Rebels capture the Quneitra Crossing, ten villages/towns, one base and two strategic hills; Rebels pull back from western Damascus countryside into northern Daraa countryside; Al-Nusra Front takes 45 U.N. peacekeepers hostage on 28 August and released on 12 September; Army counter-attack on Mashara repelled.

Belligerents
Free Syrian Army; Islamic Front; Jabhat Ansar al-Islam; Al-Nusra Front	(Syria) Syrian Arab Republic: Syrian Armed Forces; National Defense Force	(United Nations) UNDOF

Commanders and leaders
Muhammad Majid al-Khatib (Alwiya al-Furqan leader); Abu Uthman (Ansar al-Huda commander)	Brigadier-general Nazir Fuddah	Lt. Gen. Iqbal Singh Singha

Units involved
Free Syrian Army; Youth of Sunnah Brigade; Quneitra Military Council; Ababil Houran Brigade; Alwiya al-Furqan; Fursan al-Ababil brigade; Ansar al-Huda; Islamic Front; Ahrar ash-Sham	7th Division; 90th Brigade	Unknown

Strength
Unknown	Unknown	UNDOF: Hundreds; 119–120 (Quneitra border crossing area)

Casualties and losses
76+ rebels killed	71+ Syrian soldiers killed 11+ captured 1 Sukhoi Su-24 fighter jet downed by Israel	44–45 U.N. peacekeepers captured
- 1 Israeli soldier wounded

The 2014 Quneitra offensive, code-named “The Real Promise” or "Chargers of Dawn", was a military operation launched by Syrian rebels during the Syrian civil war in Quneitra Governorate, in an attempt to take control of several sections in the central part of the province and around Quneitra city "with the aim of opening the way to Damascus."

The Quneitra Crossing is considered to be a "gateway" into Damascus from the west. The rebel capture of the crossing meant that the rebels gained control over a long section of the border with Lebanon (Sheikh Mountains), Jordan and the ceasefire line in the Golan Heights.

== Rebel offensive ==
=== Quneitra crossing and UN personnel crisis ===
On 27 August, rebels took control of the Quneitra Crossing between Syria and the Israeli-occupied Golan Heights. At least 20 soldiers and 14 rebels were killed during the battle. Fighting in the area continued in towns northeast of the crossing, while the Israel Defense Forces (IDF) shelled two Syrian army positions in retaliation for six mortar shells that fell in the Israeli-occupied Golan Heights and the wounding of an Israeli officer. The Al-Nusra Front, Ahrar ash-Sham and other rebel groups (including moderate groups) participated in the fighting. The next day, fighters from the Nusra front captured 44-45 U.N. peacekeepers and surrounded 75 others, resulting in a gun fight that lasted over 7 hours. A group of 35 U.N. soldiers were successfully escorted out of the UN encampment in Breiqa by their colleagues. Rebels tried to breach the Rwihana U.N. encampment, but the attack was repelled by the U.N. defenders with support from the Syrian Army. The remaining 40 peacekeepers were eventually evacuated during the night of 29 August, after a ceasefire was established.

=== Quneitra countryside offensive ===
On 4 September, rebels announced the start of a new military operation in the Quneitra countryside, Over a period of two days, rebels managed to capture Mashara town, the Tell Mashara and the Khamiseyyi Detachment. At least 21 rebels were killed since the start of the operation. According to Charles Lister, the offensive was led by the FSA backed by the al-Nusra Front.

On 6 September, the Army launched a counter-attack to recapture Mashara town, but reportedly failed. Meanwhile, rebels captured the Majduliya hospital which served as an Army stronghold. According to the SOHR, at least 26 soldiers and 17 rebels were killed that day, while the pro-government Al-Masdar news site reported over 50 rebels were killed in an ambush by a Druze militia. Al-Masdar news also claimed that government forces captured the town of Nabe’ al Sakher. However, according to at least one pro-opposition source, the town already appeared to be under government control before the offensive was launched. Rebels captured Nabe’ al Sakher the next day.

On 9 September, Syrian Army units retreated from the Khan al-Hallabat area, after rebels advanced there. At the same time, rebels captured the strategic Tell al-Mal, which connects the Quneitra and Daraa provinces. Later that day, rebels also captured Al-Mal, al-Taiha, Aqraba and the provincial border village of Kafr Nasij east of the hill. At least eight rebels were killed that day. At this point, according to the SOHR, rebels controlled about 70% of the villages and towns in Quneitra Governorate.

On 10 September, rebels in the western countryside of Damascus pulled back into the northern countryside of Daraa province after the latest rebel gains. Meanwhile, rebels were advancing toward the outskirts of Madinat al-Baath, Khan Arnabah and into the ruined city of Quneitra, while the Army send reinforcements to al-Harra, al-Sanamayn, al-Jidiya and Zimrin east of Golan. The next day, Al-Nusra Front released all 45 U.N. peacekeepers they abducted on 28 August.

On 12 September, rebels took control of the villages of Rawadi and al-Hamidiya, while they were also trying to capture the towns of al-Baath and Khan Arnabah.

As of 13 September, the Syrian government had lost control of about 80 percent of towns and villages in Quneitra province. Two days later, the rebels managed to completely seize the Syrian-controlled side of the Golan. At the same time, the United Nations was forced to pull back hundreds of peacekeepers to the Israeli-occupied sector of the Golan. According to the Syrian ambassador Bashar Jaafari, the rebels took over their bases, weapons and vehicles.

On 18 September, rebels captured the Deir al-Adas area in Daraa province, east of Kafar Nasig, after the Army pulled back from it.

On 23 September, rebels announced the start of the Battle of "Nasron Mena Allah wa Fathon Qarib", targeting two hills and two bases related to 90th Brigade. Their aim was the complete control over the Quneitra countryside and the siege of the towns of Khan Arnabah and al-Baath. At the same day, the IDF downed a Syrian fighter jet that had infiltrated into Israeli airspace. The pilot died later that day, while at least 16 rebels were killed around the village of Taranja in the northern Quneitra countryside. The rebel attack failed and was ended shortly after.

== Aftermath ==
On 14 October, rebels of the "Fajer al Tawhid- First Corps Operation Room" announced the start of the "Qasas al Adel" battle, which aimed to capture Tell Krum hill, Jaba town, Mant al Faras detachment, Robai checkpoint and the Army held-Sharia School. This rebel operation also failed its objectives.

On 21 October, the Army launched a counter-attack on the villages of al-Samdaniya and al-Hamidiya among the arrival of new Army reinforcements in an attempt to regain control of this area. According to Al-Masdar, pro-government troops recaptured Al-Samdaniya and broke through the defenses of the rebels in Al-Hamidiya, where heavy clashes occurred as the military was pushing into the village. The fighting led to the death of a commander in a rebel brigade and four other rebels.

== See also ==
- Daraa offensive (October 2014)
- 2018 Southern Syria offensive
