= Daraa offensive (October 2014) =

Military operation

- Part of the Syrian Civil War
- Map showing the rebel advances and government counterattacks
Date	3–6 October 2014 (3 days)
Location	Daraa Governorate, Syria
Result	Rebel victory: Army counter-attack on Deir al-Adas repelled
Territorial changes	Rebels capture al-Harrah town, two villages, three checkpoints, Tell al-Harrah and its radar base

Belligerents
(Syrian opposition) Free Syrian Army; Al-Nusra Front	(Syria) Syrian Arab Republic: Syrian Armed Forces; National Defense Force; Supported by: Russia (alleged)

Commanders and leaders
Captain Abu Aws	Brig. Gen. Mahmud Abo Arraj (Brigade 121 commander); Brig. Gen. Nazir Fuddah

Units involved
(Syrian opposition) Free Syrian Army; (Syrian opposition) Southern Front; (Syrian opposition) Syrian Revolutionaries Front; (Syrian opposition) Hamza Division; (Syrian opposition) Tawhid Kata’ib Horan; (Syrian opposition) Saif al-Sham Brigade; Alwiya al-Furqan; Jaysh al-Ababil; Amoud Houran Brigade; Martyrs of Damascus Brigades; Martyrs of Al-Hara Brigade; Ababil Army; Al-Sabtain Brigade	7th Division: 121st Brigade; 9th Division; 90th Brigade; 15th Brigade

Strength
Unknown	Unknown

Casualties and losses
63+ killed	53+ killed
- 26+ civilians killed

The October Daraa offensive, code-named "wa al-Fajr wa Layali Asher" ("By the Dawn and ten nights"), was a military operation launched by Syrian rebels during the Syrian civil war in Daraa Governorate, in an attempt to take control of Al-Harra and Al-Sanamayn. This operation came after the successful rebel offensive in Quneitra province, which resulted in the rebels seizing the Syrian-controlled side of the Golan and the capture of a number of towns, villages and hills in Quneitra and Daraa provinces.

== Failed army attack and rebel offensive ==
On 3 October, 23 soldiers were reportedly killed after a failed attempt to regain control over Deir al-Adas. The next day, rebels announced the start of a military operation called "wa al-Fajr wa Layali Asher", which aimed to capture al-Harra town and its 1,075 meters high strategic hill and to besiege Army forces in al-Sanamayn and its surrounding barracks. That day, between 18 and 60 rebels were killed.

On 5 October, at least 30 soldiers and 29 rebels were killed at Tell al-Harrah and at its radar base. The rebels captured the hill, Zimrin village and the Oum El-Aaoussaj barrier in al-Harrah town. According to opposition sources, two army tanks were destroyed and one fighter jet was downed, while rebels also managed to capture the Tell al-Ahmar and the security facilitity in the south of al-Harrah town and the al-Jadeera checkpoint east of it. The base on the hill contained Center C, a spy facility run by a Russian special unit.

The next day, rebels captured the village of Zimrin (east of Al-Harrah town), the two strategic hills surrounding it (Western Tell Zimrin and Northern Tell Zimrin), and two checkpoints nearby. That day, 16 rebels (including two commanders) and six members of the same family were killed.

== Aftermath ==
On 10 October, the Syrian Army started bombing al-Harrah town from the air and with ground-to-ground missiles, killing 20 civilians.

On 15 October, the Syrian brigadier-general “Mahmud Abo Arraj”, commander of the Brigade 121 affiliated to the Seventh Division, fled his home in Damascus to the Syrian-Jordanian border after hearing he will be on trial and executed on charge of high treason due to "handing over al-Harrah Hill". He was likely killed in Rif Dimashq, but his body is still missing.

On 17 October, rebels announced the start of a new battle called “Ahlo al-Azem", which aimed to capture the following Army checkpoints: Umm al-Mayazen al Tebeh, Al-Ma’esra checkpoint and Al-Kazeyyat checkpoint. These checkpoints are located along the Damascus-Jordan highway and are considered the biggest of their kind in the eastern area. On 20 October, rebels captured the al-Jeser, al-Falahin gas station and al-Ma'sara checkpoints near Umm al-Mayazan after three days of fighting. Umm al-Mayazan village was captured by the rebels the next day after heavy fighting with pro-government troops, who withdrew from the village and reportedly inflicted heavy casualties on the rebels. That same day, at least 8 civilians were killed after the Syrian Arab Air Force bombed the Nasib border town.

On 23 October, rebels captured the Umm al-Mayathen checkpoint near Nasib border crossing.

== See also ==
- Daraa Governorate campaign
