= Al-Masmiyah =

Al-Masmiyah المسمية Musmiyeh Mesmiyeh
- Town
- Al-Mismiyah
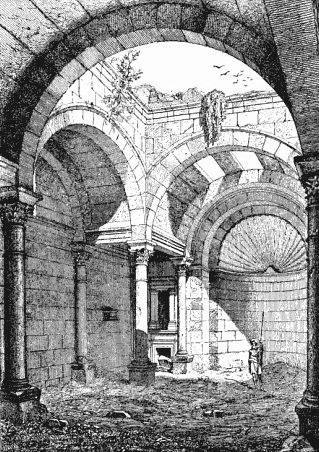
- 19th-century drawing of interior space of the Roman temple ("Praetorium") in al-Masmiyah

- Location in Syria
- Coordinates: 33°7′45″N 36°23′38″E
- Grid position: 280/281 PAL
- Country: Syria
- Governorate: Daraa
- District: al-Sanamayn
- Subdistrict: al-Masmiyah

Population (2004)
  - Total: 1,498
- Time zone: UTC+3 (AST)

Al-Masmiyah (Arabic: المسمية, also spelled Musmiyeh, Mesmiyeh, Mismiya, Mismia and Musmeih) is a town in southern Syria, administratively part of the Daraa Governorate, located northeast of Daraa in the al-Sanamayn District. Nearby localities include Jabab and Muthabin to the west, Ghabaghib to the northeast, Jubb al-Safa to the north, Burraq to the northeast, Khalkhalah and al-Surah al-Saghirah to the southeast and Dama to the south.

== History ==
The ancient city of Phaena, judging by the ruin field still visible at Masmiya in the 19th century, had a radius of roughly three miles, making it as large as the ancient walled area of Damascus and larger than the Old City of Jerusalem (which is of Early Muslim date in its present outline and smaller than some of its earlier iterations).

=== Roman period ===
Al-Masmiyah is identified with the Roman-era town of Phaena. Phaena was the capital of the Trachonitis district of Roman Syria, as confirmed by a Greek inscription on the Roman temple which reads "Julius Saturninus to the people of Phaena, capital of Trachon." The ruins of a Roman era house built in the Batanean architectural style is believed to have possibly served as the home of the Roman governor of Trachonitis. One of the rooms on the ground-level floor was supported by an 18-foot arch and had a cornice-decorated ceiling. The town contains the ruins of a Roman-era pagan temple, called the Praetorium, that was constructed by the commander of the Third Gallic Legion between 160–169 CE during the reign of the Roman emperors Aurelius Antoninus and Lucius Aurelius Verus.

In the early 3rd century CE, Phaena was still an important village known as a metrocomia.

=== Byzantine period ===
The Praetorium was transformed into a church during the Byzantine period and the structural plan makes it one of the oldest examples of Byzantine church architecture. During the Byzantine period it became an episcopal see, whose bishops participated in the ecumenical councils of Ephesus (431) and Chalcedon (451).

=== Ottoman period ===
==== 19th century ====
In 1810, Swiss explorer Johann Burckhardt was the first contemporary scholar to visit al-Masmiyah and he was later followed by Bankes and Barry, who sketched a precise plan of the Praetorium, in 1819. In 1838, Biblical scholar Eli Smith reported that Kurds inhabited the village. By the late 1860s a few impoverished Arab families from the Sulut tribe reportedly lived inside the ruins of al-Masmiyah. Apparently, the village was abandoned most of the time, but was occasionally occupied by nomadic Arab families seeking shelter in its ruins.

In the 1870s, al-Masmiyah was an uninhabited village. However, it was later settled when the Ottoman sultan Abdul Hamid II (1876–1909) acquired al-Masmiyah and six other nearby Hauran villages in the late 19th century as a personal estate. The farmers he employed in the village were afforded security, giving them protection from nomadic raiders. They were also exempt from conscription, protected from monetary collections from local notables and at times were loaned money without interest. These factors resulted in the prosperity of al-Masmiyah and the larger estate.

In 1875, before Abdul Hamid's reign, the Ottoman army took apart the Praetorium for the construction material used to build a nearby army barracks at Burraq.

In 1886, al-Masmiyah was briefly occupied by the Druze clans of Atrash and Halabi during a quarrel with the Sulut tribe.

==== 20th century ====
Following the Young Turk Revolution in 1908, the sultan ceded estate to the treasury department of the Damascus government and consequently, the inhabitants, who were both tenants of the government and permanent residents of the villages, had to pay 20–22% of their agricultural products to the authorities. Nonetheless, the conditions of the inhabitants of the government estate were better than the estates of the notables. In 1915 the population of al-Masmiyah was estimated as 300 Melkites (Greek Catholics) and 20 Sunni Muslims.

== Archaeological remains ==
According to Western traveler Josias Leslie Porter who visited the region in the late 1850s, the ruins of al-Masmiyah "are among the most interesting and beautiful in the Hauran," not least due to its numerous Greek inscriptions. The majority of the ancient city's homes were in rubble, but a number of public buildings were relatively well-preserved. Porter further remarked that except for the Roman temple "there are several other buildings ... but they are not remarkable either for their size or architecture.

=== Roman temple ===
The temple was destroyed in 1875 or 76 by the Ottoman army, who used its stones to build a barracks at Burraq. The temple had earlier been photographed by Tancrède Dumas. It still remained the subject of study by scholars in Greco-Roman architecture after its dismantlement.

This is a description based on traveler reports predating the 1875 destruction.

Along with the Roman temple dedicated to Tyche in nearby al-Sanamayn, the so-called "Praetorium" of al-Masmiyah was the only Roman temple in the Levant that contained niches for statues in the cella. This unique feature in Roman architecture was likely inspired by pre-Roman architecture, particularly the temple of Baal-Shamin in the Syrian Desert town of Palmyra or in various Arabian cities. The Praetorium was situated atop a podium in a temenos surrounded by colonnades.

It was relatively small, measuring 24.8 x 16.4 meters. It had a rectangular ground plan with a semi-circular apse that projected onto one side of the building opposite of the doorway. Both sides of the doorway contained niches reserved for statues. The interior space consisted of a single room, which was the naos, and measured 15.09 x 13.78 meters.

The "Praetorium" was formerly topped by a square domed roof, likely a cloister vault, which had already collapsed by the 19th century. The roof had been supported by four free-standing columns fixed at the inner angles of cross-vaulted arches, which together formed a Greek cross. On the opposite end of each columns stood a half-column, making for a total of four main columns, eight half-columns, and four quarter columns (situated at each corner) inside the naos. The arches sat on lintels that spanned the space between the outer wall and the columns supporting the roof.

There were six niches against the walls that were reserved for the placement of statues and in the center of them was the main space, the adyton, used to hold the main statue of the pagan cult. The adyton was topped by a conch-shaped half-dome. The building had two windows, a rare feature in Classical pagan temples, and a total of three entryways. Of the entryways, there was a principal central doorway that was higher and broader than the two side-doors.

The temple ruins contained a partially destroyed portico with six columns. The material used for the building was dry stone. Other than the dome and the portico, the building had been well preserved until the 19th century.

== Demographics ==
According to the Syria Central Bureau of Statistics (CBS), al-Masmiyah had a population of 1,498 in the 2004 census. It is the administrative center of the al-Masmiyah nahiyah ("subdistrict") which consists of 16 localities with a collective population of 8,773 in 2004. As of the early 20th century, its inhabitants were largely Melkite Christians, though there was a small Muslim community as well. In 2004, the village still had a significant Melkite Christian population.

In 2011, the Melkite Greek Catholic Church had approximately 3,000 believers.

== Religious buildings ==
- Our Lady of the Annunciation Melkite Greek Catholic Church

== See also ==
- Christians in Syria
- Hejaz railway: Mismia was one of the first stations built

== Bibliography ==
- Ball, W. (2002). Rome in the East. Routledge. ISBN 9780415243575.
- Donahue, Alice A. (1988). Xoana and the Origins of Greek Sculpture. Scholars Press. ISBN 9780891309550.
- Firro, Kais (1992). A History of the Druzes. Vol. 1. BRILL. ISBN 9004094377.
- Freshfield, D. (1869). Travels in the central Caucasus and Bashan: including visits to Ararat and Tabreez and ascents of Kazbek and Elbruz. Longmans, Green, & Co.
- Issawi, Charles Phillip (1988). The Fertile Crescent, 1800-1914: A Documentary Economic History. Oxford University Press. ISBN 0195049519.
- Longfellow, William Pitt Preble (1903). A Cyclopaedia of Works of Architecture: in Italy, Greece, and the Levant. Scribner.
- Porter, J.L. (1858). A Handbook for Travellers in Syria and Palestine. Vol. 1. Murray.
- Robinson, E.; Smith, E. (1841). Biblical Researches in Palestine, Mount Sinai and Arabia Petraea: A Journal of Travels in the year 1838. Vol. 3. Boston: Crocker & Brewster.
- Segal, Arthur (2008). "Religious Architecture in the Roman Near East: Temples of the Basalt Lands (Trachon and Hauran).". In Kaizer, Ted (ed.). The Variety of Local Religious Life in the Near East: In the Hellenistic and Roman Periods. BRILL. pp. 97-132 (The temple at Masmiyeh (AD 164-9): 109-112). ISBN 978-9004167353. Suggested reconstruction of Mismiyeh temple: Pl. XXVIII.
- Socin, A. (1876). Palestine and Syria: handbook for travellers. Baedeker.
- Sturgis, R. (1907). A history of architecture having special regard to the natural artistic results of construction and those methods of design which are the result of abstract thinking and of the pure sense of form. Vol. 1. New York: Baker.
- Van Millingen, A. (1912). Byzantine Churches In Constantinople (Illustrated ed.). Echo Library.
