= Muthabin =

Motben موتبين
- Village
- Mothabeen
- Location in Syria
- Coordinates: 33°8′36″N 36°14′47″E
- Grid position: 266/283 PAL
- Country: Syria
- Governorate: Daraa Governorate
- District: Al-Sanamayn District
- Nahiyah: Ghabaghib

Population (2004)
  - Total: 2,351
- Time zone: UTC+3 (AST)

Muthabin (Arabic: موثبين; transliteration: Mūʿtabīn, also spelled Mothabeen) is a village in southern Syria, administratively part of the Daraa Governorate, located northeast of Daraa in the al-Sanamayn District. Nearby localities include Ghabaghib to the north, al-Masmiyah to the east, Jabab to the southeast, Bassir to the south, al-Sanamayn to the southwest and Deir al-Bukht to the west. According to the Syria Central Bureau of Statistics (CBS), Muthabin had a population of 2,351 in the 2004 census.

== History ==
Muthabin dates back to antiquity, having been mentioned in pre-Islamic Syriac texts.

In 1838, Mutabin was noted as a ruin, situated "the Nukra, north of Al-Shaykh Maskin".

== Religious buildings ==
- Prophet Elias (Elijah) Greek Orthodox Church
- Saints Peter and Paul Greek Orthodox Church

== Bibliography ==
- Robinson, E.; Smith, E. (1841). Biblical Researches in Palestine, Mount Sinai and Arabia Petraea: A Journal of Travels in the year 1838. Vol. 3. Boston: Crocker & Brewster.
