= Deir al-Bukht =

Deir al-Bukht دير البخت
- Village
- Location within Syria
- Coordinates: 33°8′49″N 36°11′25″E
- Grid position: 261/283 PAL
- Country: Syria
- Governorate: Daraa Governorate
- District: al-Sanamayn District
- Nahiyah: Ghabaghib

Population (2004)
  - Total: 5,381
- Time zone: UTC+3 (AST)

Deir al-Bukht (Arabic: دير البخت, also spelled Deir al-Bukhit or Dayr al-Bakht) is a town in southern Syria, administratively part of the al-Sanamayn District of the Daraa Governorate located north of Daraa. It is situated about 63 kilometers south of the capital Damascus. Nearby localities include al-Sanamayn to the south, Kafr Shams to the southwest, Deir al-Adas to the west, Ghabaghib to the northeast, Muthabin to the east and Jabab to the southeast. In the 2004 census by the Syria Central Bureau of Statistics (CBS), Deir al-Bukht had a population of 5,381.

== History ==
The name 'Deir al-Bukht' is Arabic for 'Convent of the Bactrian Camel'. According to early 13th-century Syrian geographer Yaqut al-Hamawi, Deir al-Bukht had previously been known as 'Deir Mikhail', a monastery dedicated to Saint Michael. It received its current name as a result of early 8th-century Umayyad caliph Abd al-Malik's habit of having a Bactrian camel saddled at the monastery.

An ancestor of the Abbasid dynasty, Ali ibn Abd Allah ibn al-Abbas, maintained a garden at Deir al-Bukht for recreation during the reign of Abd al-Malik's successor, al-Walid. Ali was accused of killing his adopted brother Salit in Deir al-Bukht, but the caliph's brother Sulayman ibn Abd al-Malik and Ubayd Allah ibn Ziyad interjected on Ali's behalf, persuading al-Walid to spare his life. Ali was imprisoned instead.

In 1596 Dayr al-Bukht appeared in the Ottoman tax registers as part of the nahiya (subdistrict) of Bani Kilab in Hauran Sanjak. It had an entirely Muslim population consisting of 15 households and 6 bachelors. The villagers paid a fixed tax-rate of 20% on wheat, barley, summer crops, goats and/or beehives; a total of 5,770 akçe. Half of the revenue went to a waqf.

In the 19th-century Biblical scholar Eli Smith noted that Deir al-Bukht was a Muslim village.

During the French Mandate period, Deir al-Bukht was the center of the Al al-Zu'bi clan which controlled a total of 16 villages in the Hauran, including Khirbet Ghazaleh and al-Musayfirah, and provided the local religious leadership of the Qadiriyya, a Sufi Muslim order dating back to the 12th century. The head of the clan was Muflih al-Zu'bi who served as a deputy of the French Mandate authorities.

== Bibliography ==
- Batatu, H. (1999). Syria's Peasantry, the Descendants of Its Lesser Rural Notables, and Their Politics. Princeton University Press. ISBN 0691002541.
- Hütteroth, W.-D.; Abdulfattah, K. (1977). Historical Geography of Palestine, Transjordan and Southern Syria in the Late 16th Century. Erlanger Geographische Arbeiten, Sonderband 5. Erlangen, Germany: Vorstand der Fränkischen Geographischen Gesellschaft. ISBN 3-920405-41-2.
- Le Strange, G. (1890). Palestine Under the Moslems: A Description of Syria and the Holy Land from A.D. 650 to 1500. Committee of the Palestine Exploration Fund.
- Robinson, E.; Smith, E. (1841). Biblical Researches in Palestine, Mount Sinai and Arabia Petraea: A Journal of Travels in the year 1838. Vol. 3. Boston: Crocker & Brewster.
- Thomas, David Richard (2002). Christians at the heart of Islamic rule: church life and scholarship in ʻAbbasid Iraq. Vol. 2001. BRILL. ISBN 9004129383.
