= Bassir =

Bassir بصير
- Town
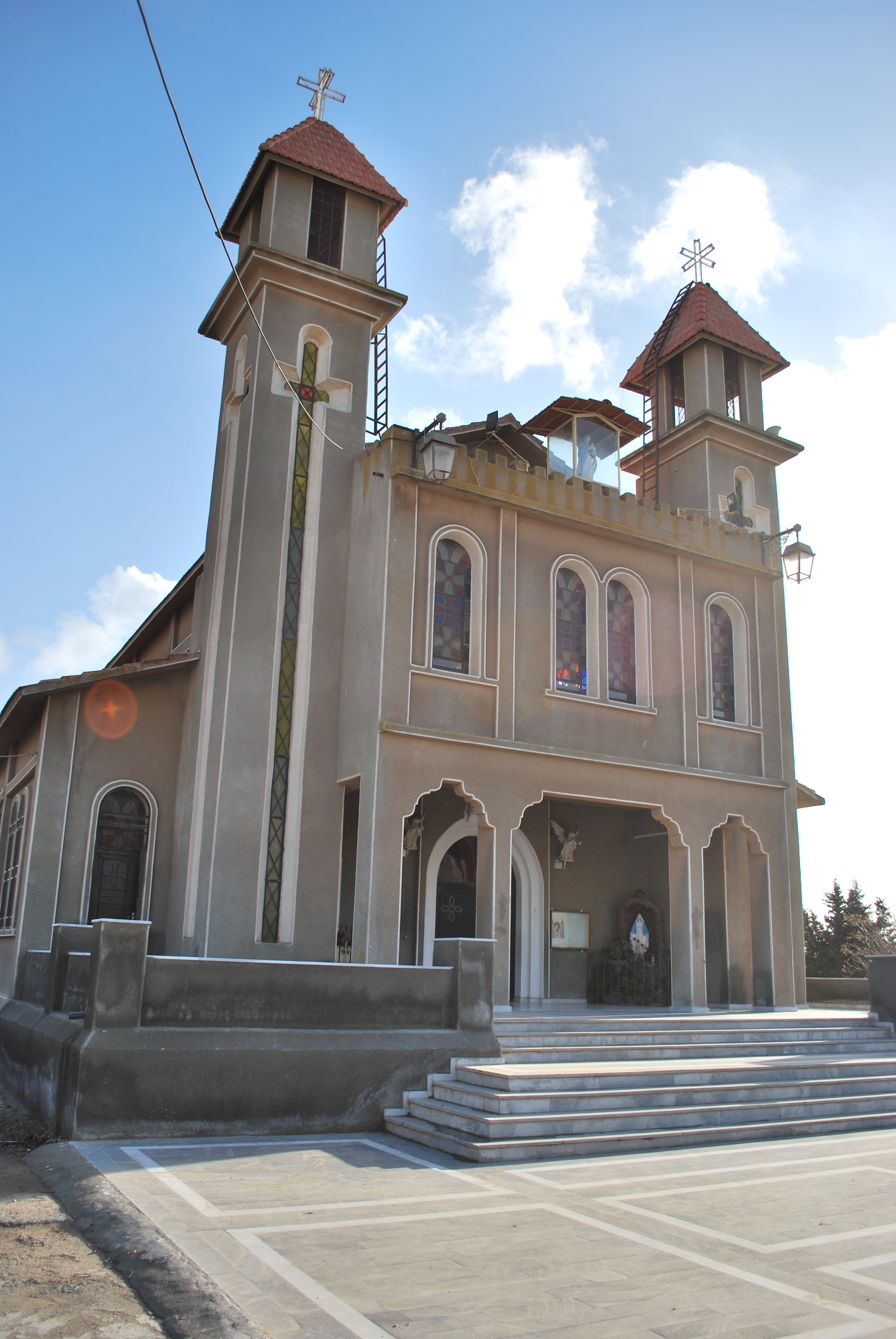
- St. George Church in Bassir, 2010

- Location in Syria
- Coordinates: 33°03′39.28″N 36°14′00.43″E
- Grid position: 265/274 PAL
- Country: Syria
- Governorate: Daraa
- District: Sanamayn
- Nahiyah: Sanamayn
- Elevation: 630 m (2,070 ft)

Population (2004 census)
  - Total: 1,442
- Time zone: UTC+3 (AST)

Bassir (Arabic: بصير) is a town in southern Syria, administratively part of the as-Sanamayn District in the Daraa Governorate. It is located 630 meters (2,070 ft) above sea level and 51 kilometers (32 mi) south of Damascus. Bassir is bordered by Lajat to the east, Khabab to the south, as-Sanamayn to the west, and Jabab to the north. The town lies in the middle of three main Syrian cities: Damascus, Daraa and Suwayda. According to the Syria Central Bureau of Statistics (CBS), Bassir had a population of 1,442 in the 2004 census. Its inhabitants are predominantly Melkite Greek Catholic Christians.

== Etymology ==
The name Bassir comes from the word Pethera, which in Greek means “high” or “elevated,” referring to its relatively high location. Basrah is the most common form. In Arabic, the word baṣrah means “the overwatcher.”

== History ==
=== Roman era ===
Bassir was built as a military base for Roman forces to support the regiments scattered throughout the surrounding region. The area is rocky, consisting of volcanic and lava stones, and is known as Lajah. Bassir also served as a stopover for caravans traveling between Babylon and Palestine.

=== Ottoman period ===
In 1596, Bassir appeared in the Ottoman tax registers as Busayr al-Kubra and was part of the nahiya of Bani Kilab in the Hauran Sanjak. It had an entirely Muslim population consisting of 4 households and 3 bachelors. The villagers paid a fixed tax-rate of 25% on wheat, barley, summer crops, goats and beehives; a total of 2,900 akçe.

In 1838, Buseir was noted as a Catholic village, situated "in the Nukra, north of ash-Shaykh Miskin".

== Demographics ==
The people of this area are known to be part of the Ghassanid Christian tribes that immigrated from Yemen to the Hauran region of southern Syria in the early 3rd century CE, where they established the Kingdom of the Ghassanids. The current population is about 3,000, but unlike neighboring villages, Bassir has a very low birth rate and has significantly declined over the years. Many people originally from Bassir now live in Damascus, although they still own homes in the town. During the Ottoman period, and due to a lack of resources, a notable number of residents emigrated to South America, particularly Brazil and Argentina. Others emigrated to nearby countries such as Lebanon, where many of their descendants now live in the Beqaa Valley and the Koura region near Tripoli.

=== Religion ===
The inhabitants of Bassir are Christians and follow the Melkite Greek Catholic Church. This is similar to the situation in their neighboring towns: Khabab, Izraa, Tubna, Shaqra that all their current citizens originally immigrated from Salkhad.

Bassir once had two ancient Byzantine churches. One was built after the conversion to Christianity but was later completely demolished. The other church remains buried beneath the one constructed in the late 19th and early 20th centuries, which has since been renovated. The latter church is believed to have been first used by the new settlers of Bassir.

In 2011, the Melkite Greek Catholic Church had approximately 4,200 believers.

== Education ==
Bassir is well known for its highly educated population and was once called the “home of light,” owing to the large number of educated people who spread knowledge and education to surrounding towns over the years. During the past 50 years, some residents have emigrated to countries such as France and the United States, mostly to pursue higher education. Many notable scientists and scholars were born in this small town, including physicians, engineers, and politicians.

== Architecture ==
The houses in Bassir are made of volcanic and Lava stones that are currently used to build the new houses of the town.

== Religious buildings ==
- St. George Melkite Greek Catholic Church (Old Church)
- St. George Melkite Greek Catholic Church

== See also ==
- Christians in Syria

== Bibliography ==
- Hütteroth, W.-D.; Abdulfattah, K. (1977). Historical Geography of Palestine, Transjordan and Southern Syria in the Late 16th Century. Erlanger Geographische Arbeiten, Sonderband 5. Erlangen, Germany: Vorstand der Fränkischen Geographischen Gesellschaft. ISBN 3-920405-41-2.
- Robinson, E.; Smith, E. (1841). Biblical Researches in Palestine, Mount Sinai and Arabia Petraea: A Journal of Travels in the year 1838. Vol. 3. Boston: Crocker & Brewster.
