= Zimrin =

Zimrin زمرين
- Village
- Location within Syria
- Coordinates: 33°3′41″N 36°4′34″E
- Grid position: 250/274 PAL
- Country: Syria
- Governorate: Daraa
- District: Sanamayn
- Subdistrict: Sanamayn

Population (2004 census)
  - Total: 2,048
- Time zone: UTC+3 (AST)

Zimrin (Arabic: زمرين, transliteration: Zimrīn, also spelled Zamrin) is a village in southern Syria, administratively part of the as-Sanamayn District in the Daraa Governorate. Nearby localities include Qayta and as-Sanamayn to the east, Samlin and Inkhil to the southeast, Jasim to the south, Nimer to the southwest, al-Harra to the west, Aqraba to the northwest and Kafr Shams to the northeast. According to the Syria Central Bureau of Statistics (CBS), Zimrin had a population of 2,048 in the 2004 census. Its inhabitants are predominantly Sunni Muslims.

== History ==
=== Ottoman era ===
In 1596, Zimrin appeared in the Ottoman tax registers, situated in the nahiya of Jaydur, part of Hauran Sanjak. It had an entirely Muslim population consisting of 16 households and 15 bachelors. They paid a fixed tax-rate of 25% on agricultural products, including wheat, barley, summer crops, goats and beehives; in addition to occasional revenues; a total of 2,750 akçe.

In 1897, the German archaeologist Gottlieb Schumacher noted that Zimrin had a population of 300 people living in 60 homes and that the village contained ruins. In the preceding years, some of Zimrin's peasants joined others from Jasim to resettle the village of al-Harra at the foot of the nearby Tell al-Hara hill.

== Religious buildings ==
- Mosque

== Bibliography ==
- Hütteroth, W.-D.; Abdulfattah, K. (1977). Historical Geography of Palestine, Transjordan and Southern Syria in the Late 16th Century. Erlanger Geographische Arbeiten, Sonderband 5. Erlangen, Germany: Vorstand der Fränkischen Geographischen Gesellschaft. ISBN 3-920405-41-2.
- Schumacher, G. (1897). "Notes from Jedur". Quarterly Statement - Palestine Exploration Fund. 29: 190–195.
