= Shaqra =

Shaqra, Shaqraa, Chaqra, Chakra or Chacra (Arabic: شقراء [ALA-LC: Shaqrāʼ]; Levantine Arabic: شقرا) may refer to:

- Shaqra, Lebanon
- Shaqra, Qatar
- Shaqra, Saudi Arabia
- Shaqra, Daraa
- Georges Chakra, Lebanese fashion designer

== See also ==
- Abu Shaqra, a surname
