= Center S =

Russian–Syrian signals intelligence 'spy' post

Center C
- Near Al-Harra in Syria
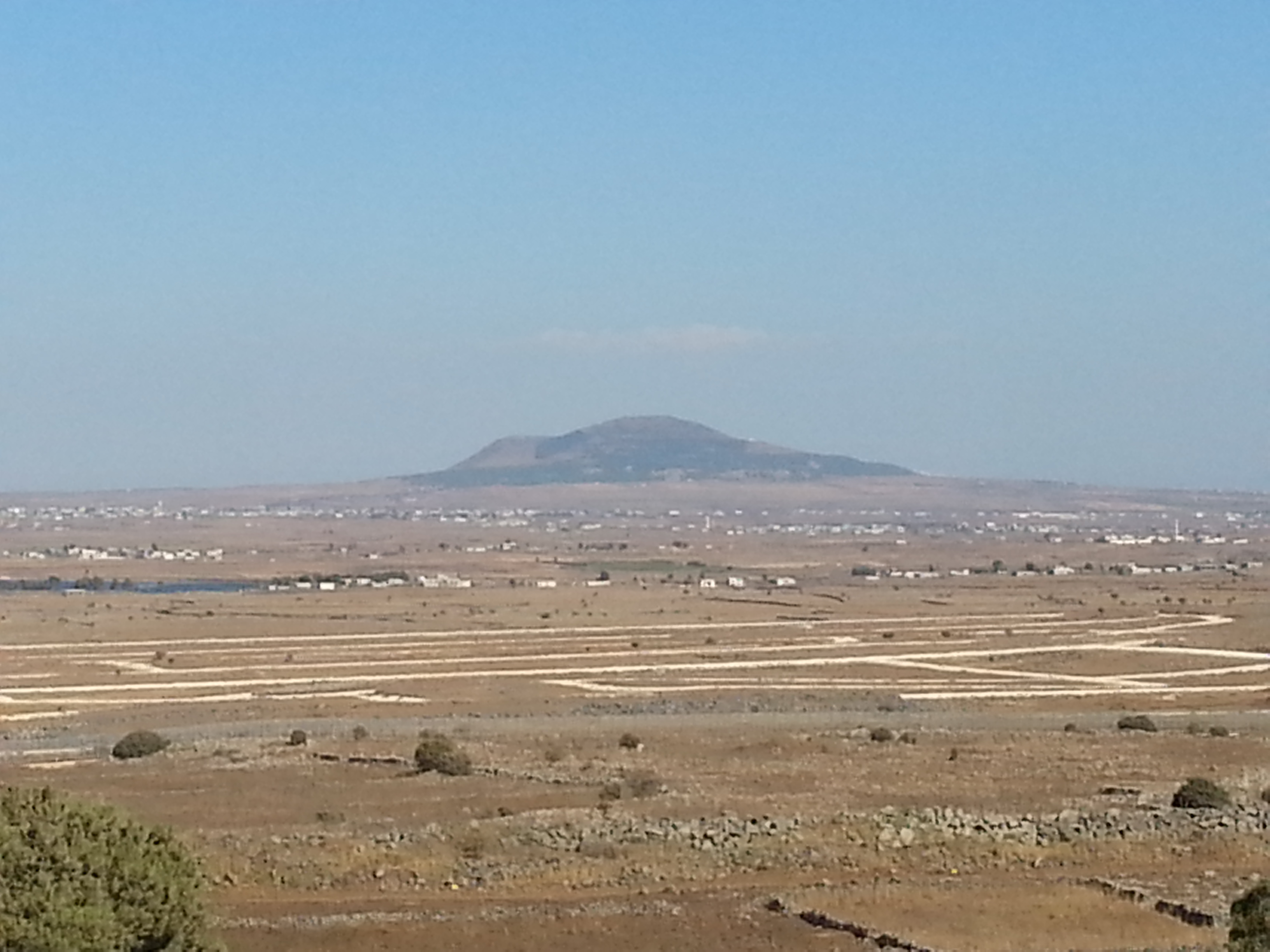
- Tel al-Harra as seen from the Golan Heights

Site information
- Type: Russian GRU signals intelligence station
- Owner: Ministry of Defence
- Operator: GRU; General Intelligence Directorate

Site history
- In use: 2005-2014
- Battles/wars: Syrian civil war

Garrison information
- Garrison: Russian GRU

Center S (Центр С in Cyrillic script) was a secret, joint, Russian–Syrian signals intelligence post near al-Harra in southwestern Syria close to the Israeli-occupied Golan Heights.

Presumably existing since before 2006, it was over-run by Free Syrian Army rebels on 5 October 2014 during the Daraa offensive. It was recaptured by the Syrian Army during the 2018 Southern Syria offensive.

== Site and purpose ==
The Center was on the peak of Tel al-Hara mountain, adjacent to the town of al-Harra in the western part of the al-Sanamayn District of the Daraa Governorate, near the Quneitra Governorate. The Center was operated on a joint Russian-Syrian basis, with Syrian Intelligence and the OSNAZ unit of the Russian GRU monitoring signals intelligence from Syrian rebels, as well as the Israel Defense Forces.

== Overrun and recapture ==
On October 5, 2014, the Center was overrun by rebels affiliated with the Free Syrian Army in the Daraa offensive. All Russian personnel had been evacuated, along with the more sensitive equipment. Center S was recaptured by SAA during the 2018 Southern Syria offensive.

== Other centers ==
At least two other Russian intelligence centers are assumed to be located inside Syria.

== See also ==
- Khmeimim Air Base
- Tartus naval base
- Mediterranean Sea Task Force
- Russian involvement in the Syrian civil war
