= Emarat Rezk =

Syrian TV actress (born 1985)

Emarat Rezk إمارات رزق
- Born: Emarat Mohammed Khier Feisal Al-Sadi; September 16, 1985 (age 39); Kafr Shams, Daraa, Syria
- Occupation: Actress
- Years active: 2004–present
- Children: 4 sons
- Website: منتدى الفنانة إمارات رزق

Emarat Rezk (Arabic: إمارات رزق) (born September 16, 1985) is a Syrian TV actress. She has played many roles in popular TV series including Bab al-Hara 3, 4 and 5.

== Biography ==
Her real name is Emarat Mohammed Khier Abdulla Al-Sadi (Arabic: إمارات محمد خير عبد الله السعدي). She was born in Kafr Shams, Daraa Governorate, Syria. She married film director Youssef Rizk and they had one son in 2005.

She later married Syrian singer Hussam Junaid, with whom she had three sons.
