= Mohsen al-Haymed =

Commander who fought for the Islamic State and Ba'athist Syria

- محسن الهيمد
- Military career
- Allegiance: Islamic State; Ba'athist Syria
- Branch: Military Security Directorate; Military Security in Sanamayn; Local armed groups
- Known for: His group that attacked al-Sanamayn
- Conflicts: Syrian civil war; March 2025 Daraa clashes

Mohsen al-Haymed (Arabic: محسن الهيمد) is a former Islamic State commander who became affiliated with Ba'athist Syria. He took part in various battles in the city of al-Sanamayn, Daraa Governorate after the fall of the Assad regime in December 2024.

== Life ==
He lives in al-Sanamayn and was formerly part of the Islamic State. Upon being captured, he joined the Military Security Directorate.

== Mohsen al-Haymed's group ==
Mohsen al-Haymed's group
- Founder: Mohsen al-Haymed
- Leader: Mohsen al-Haymed
- Dates active: ~2018—present
- Country: Syria
- Allegiance: Ba'athist resistance groups in Syria
- Headquarters: al-Sanamayn
- Ideology: Assadism
- Wars: Syrian civil war: March 2025 Daraa clashes

Al-Haymed's group was founded c. 2018 when it reconciled with Ba'athist Syria.

The group fought against drug trafficker Ahmad al-Labbad, nicknamed "Al-Shabat", whose armed group in al-Sanamayn was attacked by al-Haymed in April 2024. The impetus for the fighting was the deaths of at least seven children on 6 April 2024 by an improvised explosive device, which Al-Labbad's group was accused of planting. The clashes that occurred the following day resulted in the deaths of 17 people. Another report indicated that at least 20 people died in the fighting. The Haymed group targeted a house owned by al-Labbad with RPGs and machine gun fire; two young children died in a fire as a result.

Clashes took place in January 2025 in al-Sanamayn between al-Haymed's group and the Southern Operations Room. The clashes began following an assassination attempt on Osama Muhammad al-Atma, who was a member of al-Haymed's group. A ceasefire was reached and both sides were required to turn in their heavy and medium weapons. Over 2,000 Syrian government fighters were sent from Damascus. According to local network Free Houran Gathering, the faction had committed "dozens of kidnappings and murders" in al-Sanamayn.

In January 2025, there were further clashes in al-Sanamayn, this time between al-Haymed's group and Walid al-Zahra's group.

Al-Haymed's group led an attack alongside the Islamic State on al-Sanamayn in February 2025, taking control of areas that were formerly used by the Ninth Division of the Syrian Arab Armed Forces.

Following an attack by al-Labbad's faction on members of Haymed's group, after they were leaving a funeral, three members of Haymed's group died, while one member and a child were injured. General Security Services arrived to restore order, but Haymed's group opened fire, wounding one officer, which led to clashes taking place between Haymed's group and security forces. The Syrian Armed Forces raided al-Haymed's group and seized houses in the surroundings of al-Sanamayn, which ended with the surrender of the group. Al-Haymed escaped the raid.

Members believed to be affiliated with al-Haymed's group killed Maher al-Labad, along with "his child" and Mohammad Saleem al-Shtaar, on 1 June 2025. Clashes afterwards led to the deaths of two civilians.

The Internal Security Forces carried out an operation to arrest Mohsen al-Haymed on 17 September 2026. The clashes killed 3 members of the Internal Security Forces.
