= Burraq =

Burraq براق
- Village
- Location in Syria
- Coordinates: 33°11′6″N 36°28′47″E
- Grid position: 288/288 PAL
- Country: Syria
- Governorate: Daraa Governorate
- District: As-Sanamayn District
- Nahiyah: Al-Masmiyah
- Elevation: 620 m (2,030 ft)

Population (2004 census)
  - Total: 712
- Time zone: UTC+3 (AST)

Burraq (Arabic: براق) is a village in southern Syria, located in the Daraa Governorate and in the As-Sanamayn District. Its other names are Bouraq, Bourâq, Burāq, Bouraa, Al Burak, Burak, Buraq, Burrāq, Bourak. It is located at an altitude of 650 meters.
