= 2012–2016 Sanamayn clashes =

Battle in the Syrian civil war

2012-16 Sanamayn clashes
- Part of Syrian Civil War
Date	late 2012-December 2016 (Four years)
Location	Al-Sanamayn, Daraa Governorate, Syria
Result	Syrian Army and allies victory
Territorial changes	Syrian Army recaptures the entire city

Belligerents
Syria: Syrian Armed Forces; Shabiha; Hezbollah	Free Syrian Army: Southern Front (surrendered); Local rebel groups (surrendered)

Commanders and leaders
unknown	Yahya al-Rifa'i (Leader of Fire of the Revolution brigade) (surrendered) Maher al-Labad (Leader of Dawn of Liberation Brigade) (surrendered) Abu Fadi al-Saydali (Leader of al-Sanamayn Martyrs Battalion) (surrendered) Abd al-Latif al-Haimid (Leader of Supporting the Truth Brigades) †

Units involved
Syrian Armed Forces: Syrian Army; 9th Armoured Division; 5th Armoured Division; 15th brigade; 79th brigade; 15th Special Forces Division; National Defense Forces; Military Intelligence Directorate; Hezbollah: Lebanese Hezbollah	Alliance of Southern Forces (surrendered): 46th Infantry Division; Liwa Sha'alat al-Thawra; Liwa Fajr al-Tahrir; Katibat Shuhada' al-Sanamayn (al-Sanamayn Martyrs Battalion) (surrendered) Katibat Nusrat al-Haq (Supporting the Truth Battalion) (surrendered)

Strength
unknown	150+(2016)

The 2012-16 Sanamayn clashes was a military confrontation in the city of Sanamayn between the Syrian Arab Army, supported by Hezbollah, and local Syrian opposition fighters during the Syrian civil war. The battle lasted roughly three years until December 2016, and ended with opposition fighter inside the city laying down their weapons and settling their status with the Syrian government. The battle typically consisted of small clashes and skirmishes between the two sides as well as shelling of each other's positions. On occasion, the Syrian army would carry out raids against the rebel-held areas, some having led to significant civilian casualties.

The Syrian Army imposed a siege against the rebel held areas first in late 2015, leading to a ceasefire between the two sides, and again in 2016, leading them to sign reconciliation agreements, ending fighting in the city.

== Background ==
During March 2011, Sanamayn, like other towns and cities across Syria, became the site of protests against the government of Bashar al-Assad. On one occasion, up to 20 protesters were killed after setting a statue of Hafez al-Assad on fire. Late in the year, the first rebel groups in the city appeared, and more would follow in 2013.

== History ==
In late 2012, the first rebel group in the town, the "Al-Sanamayn Revolutionaries Battalion" was formed.

In early 2013, a rash of defections took place in the town, which was located on a strategic highway. Rebels would take over multiple areas of the city. The Syrian government remained in control of the military and security branches, main roads, heavily defended checkpoints such as the Qiyetah junction, and all military sites.

On 10 April 2013, the Syrian Army launched an assault on the city targeting the southern areas. The Syrian armed targeted the city with artillery and rocket fire from barracks outside the city as they prepared to storm the city with heavy weapons. All roads leading in and out of the city were closed. The Syrian Army, accompanied by Hezbollah and pro-government militias, stormed the town and battled their way to the city center, forcing rebel forces to withdraw from the areas. 20 houses were destroyed and at least 45 people were killed in Sanamayn alone in what was described as a massacre by opposition activists. The town of Ghabagheb, north of Sanamayn, was also stormed. 16 rebels were killed in fighting in the two towns according to the Syrian Observatory for Human Rights. Some listed the death count in Sanamayn as high as 60.

Despite the operation, rebels would continue to have a presence in Sanamayn. More groups would emerge in the town with light and medium weapons. Although the rebels were present in multiple areas of the city, the Syrian government once again remained in control of the important military checkpoints and sites, such as the base of the 9th Division, and the roads passing through the city.

Two local councils would be formed by the opposition in rebel-held areas of the town. The first was announced in August 2013, and later joined the Union of Local Councils in Daraa Province. The second was announced in November, headed by Yassin al-Atmeh, and linked through connections with other Daraa councils to the Syrian Interim Government. Despite this, the rebel-held neighborhoods of Sanamayn were mainly reliant on the Syrian government for most public services, with the local councils only able to oversee the distributions of gifts and aid on certain occasions. Due to this, and to the fact that the number of opposition fighters in the city was very small, the rebels in Sanamayn failed to play a significant role in the Daraa Governorate campaign.

Skirmishes and clashes would take place between the two sides, with rebels launching attacks on the military and security sites, leading on occasion to escalations such as shelling.

In December 2015, four civilians were reportedly killed in the town due to shelling, although it could not be verified whether or not this came from the Syrian Army or rebels in the Southern Front targeting pro-government sites in the area.

In December 2015, the Syrian Army imposed a blockade on the rebel-held neighborhoods of Sanamayn in response for the factions carrying out an attack on a car carrying an officer and several soldiers. Negotiations took place between the Syrian Army and rebel factions resulting in a ceasefire between the two sides.

In December 2016, in response to the theft of government property by a corrupt leader of a rebel faction, the Syrian Army once again besieged the rebel-held neighborhoods of Sanamayn and pressed for a reconciliation agreement. Under the terms, the rebels were to confiscate their weapons and pledge not to carry out any attacks, as well as join the regular forces or the Russian-led 5th corps. The rebels were divided on whether to negotiate or respond militarily to the Syrian Army's actions. During the siege, rebel fire from the Southern Front targeted government-held areas, leading to civilian casualties.

In the end, 510 people, including 150 rebels, accepted the reconciliation agreement, and Sanamayn came under full government control.
