= Al-Harra, Daraa =

Al-Harra الحارّة
- City
- Location within Syria
- Coordinates: 33°03′24″N 36°00′20″E
- PAL: 243/273
- Country: Syria
- Governorate: Daraa
- District: Sanamayn
- Subdistrict: Sanamayn
- Elevation: 950 m (3,120 ft)

Population (2004 census)
  - Total: 17,172
- Time zone: UTC+3 (AST)

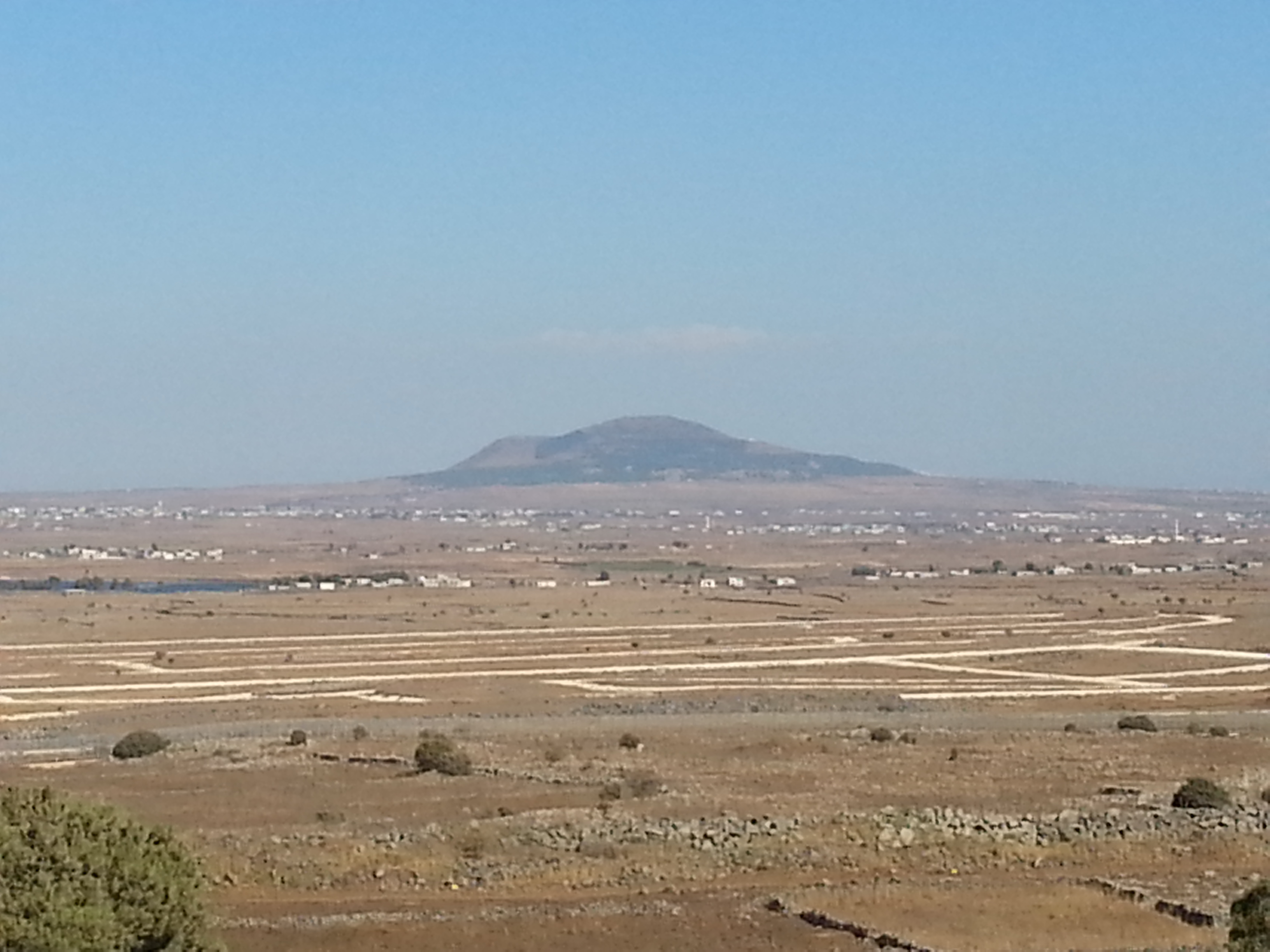
Tel Al-Harra volcanic crater in the Hauran plain, as seen from the Golan Heights.

Al-Harra (Arabic: الحارّة, romanized: al-Hārrāh, also spelled Khirbet al-Harra; translation: "the Hot") is a city in southern Syria, administratively part of the as-Sanamayn District in the Daraa Governorate. Located in the Hauran plain, it lies 55 kilometers (34 mi) north of Daraa, and just east of Bir Ajam and the Golan Heights, northwest of Jasim, west of as-Sanamayn and southwest of Kafr Shams. According to the Syria Central Bureau of Statistics (CBS), al-Harra had a population of 17,172 in the 2004 census. The city’s inhabitants are predominantly Sunni Muslims.

== History ==
Al-Harra is situated at the southeastern foot of Tell al-Harra. Both sites receive their name from the Ghassanid king al-Harith ibn Jabalah; Ḥāra is a mutilated form of Ḥārith. The hill had been known in the time of the Ghassanids as "Harith al-Jawlan". According to Irfan Shahid, ruins found in al-Harra could support the view that the town dates back to the Ghassanid era.

=== Ottoman era ===
In 1596, al-Harra appeared in the Ottoman tax registers under the name of Han, situated in the nahiya (subdistrict) of Jaydur in the Hauran Sanjak. It had an entirely Muslim population of 50 households and 25 bachelors. They paid a fixed tax-rate of 25% on agricultural products, including wheat, barley, summer crops, goats and bee-hives; in addition to occasional revenues. Their total tax was 36,638 akçe, with half of it going to a waqf (religious trust).

In 1897, Gottlieb Schumacher visited al-Harra and reported that except for two small Damascus-born Arab Christian families, the town's population of 500 was entirely Muslim. The inhabitants were fellahin originally from the nearby towns of Jasim and Zimrin who settled among the nomadic Bedouins of the area. Many of the latter continued to graze their fields in al-Harra. The 126 residences in the village consisted mostly of stone-built huts. The village itself was built around the eastern section of a small volcanic crater in the southeastern base of the Tell al-Harra elevation. At the time, the property of al-Harra was owned by Selim Freige of Beirut and its farmland was administered by Yusuf Effendi Mansur Hatim on Freige's behalf. The PEF found ancient building stones resembling other Byzantine-era artifacts in the Hauran region just outside the town's congregational mosque and used in the local store.

=== Civil war ===
Some residents of al-Harra have participated in protests against the government of Bashar al-Assad during the Syrian Revolution. The opposition-aligned National Organisation for Human Rights in Syria reported that 13 people were killed by the Syrian Army during a tank shelling on the city on 12 May 2011. Later, on 30 August three demonstrators, including a 13-year-old boy, were killed by government forces in al-Harra as they dispersed a protest there according to the Local Coordination Committees of Syria.

On 10 August 2013, the Syrian Army seized the town, formerly under opposition control. They freed prisoners held by the Free Syrian Army (FSA) and captured weapons and munitions, following their victory. The army reportedly found an almost empty village upon their arrival, since the vast majority of the residents had left their houses due to the ongoing military operations. Al-Harra was captured by Syrian rebels during the Daraa offensive in October 2014. They also captured Tell al-Harra, the hill adjacent to the town and the site of the Center C, a joint Syrian–Russian signals intelligence listening post. On 16 July 2018, the Syrian Army recaptured the town.

== Religious buildings ==
- Al-Khawla bint al-Azwar Mosque
- Al-Hawamda Mosque
- Omar ibn al-Khattab Mosque
- Husayn ibn Ali Mosque
- Sa‘d ibn Abi Waqqas Mosque
- Abu Bakr al-Siddiq Mosque
- Muawiyah ibn Abi Sufyan Mosque
- Abu Ubaydah ibn al-Jarrah Mosque

== Bibliography ==
- Hütteroth, W.-D.; Abdulfattah, K. (1977). Historical Geography of Palestine, Transjordan and Southern Syria in the Late 16th Century. Erlanger Geographische Arbeiten, Sonderband 5. Erlangen, Germany: Vorstand der Fränkischen Geographischen Gesellschaft. ISBN 3-920405-41-2.
- Schumacher, G. (1897). "Notes from Jedur". Quarterly Statement - Palestine Exploration Fund. 29: 190–195.
