= Praetorium =

Roman military headquarters structure

The Latin term praetorium (also prætorium and pretorium) originally identified the tent of a general within a Roman castrum (encampment), and derived from the title praetor, which identified a Roman magistrate. Originally, praetor ("leader") was the title of the ranking civil servant in the Roman Republic, but later identified a rank of office below the rank of consul.

The war-council meetings held in the tent of a general gave administrative and juridical meanings to the term praetorium, a usage continued into the Byzantine Empire, where the term praitōrion identified the residence of the governor of a city. The term also designated the headquarters of the Roman emperor, as well as the camp of the Praetorian Guard stationed in Rome.

== Description ==
Due to the number of uses for the word praetorium, it is difficult to describe; a praetorium could be a large building, a permanent tent, or in some cases even be mobile.

=== Exterior ===
Since the praetorium originated as the officer's quarters it could be a tent, but was often a large structure. The important design aspect of the praetorium is not symmetry, but rather proportion of one element to another. The praetorium was constructed around two open courts, which correspond to the atrium and peristyle of the Roman house. Most praetoriums had areas surrounding them delegated for exercise and drills conducted by the troops. The area ahead of the camp would be occupied by the tents housing the commander's soldiers. They were made with brick, covered in plaster, with many arches and columns.

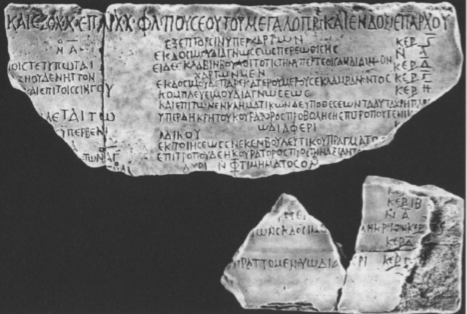
Segments of a sportulae inscribed in a stone tablet

=== Interior ===
Within the praetorium Roman officers would be able to conduct official business within special designed and designated areas. A praetorium would normally display information regarding the sportulae (schedule of fees and taxes) of its region carved directly into the walls of its main public areas. This would often be located near the office of the financial procurator.

== Biblical reference ==
In the New Testament, praetorium refers to the palace of Pontius Pilate, the Roman prefect of Judea. It is believed to have been in one of the residential palaces built by Herod the Great for himself in Jerusalem, which at that time was also the residence of his son, king Herod II. According to the New Testament, this is where Jesus Christ was tried and condemned to death. Praetorium is variously translated as "common hall", "governor's house", "judgment hall", "Pilate's house", or "palace". (Note: See Gospel of John 18:28, Mark 15:16) Additionally, Paul was held in Herod's Praetorium.

== Gallery ==
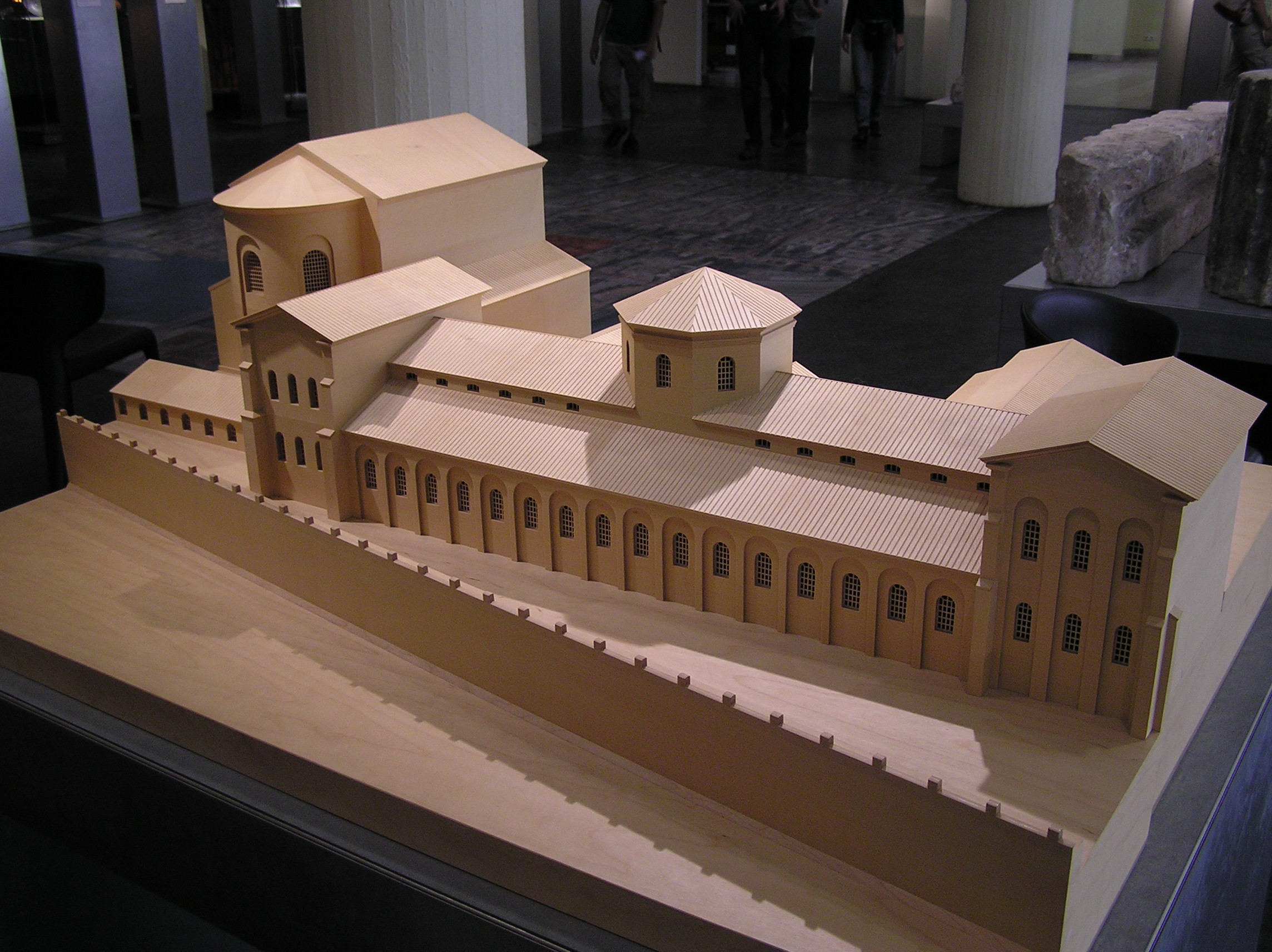
Model of the praetorium in Roman Cologne

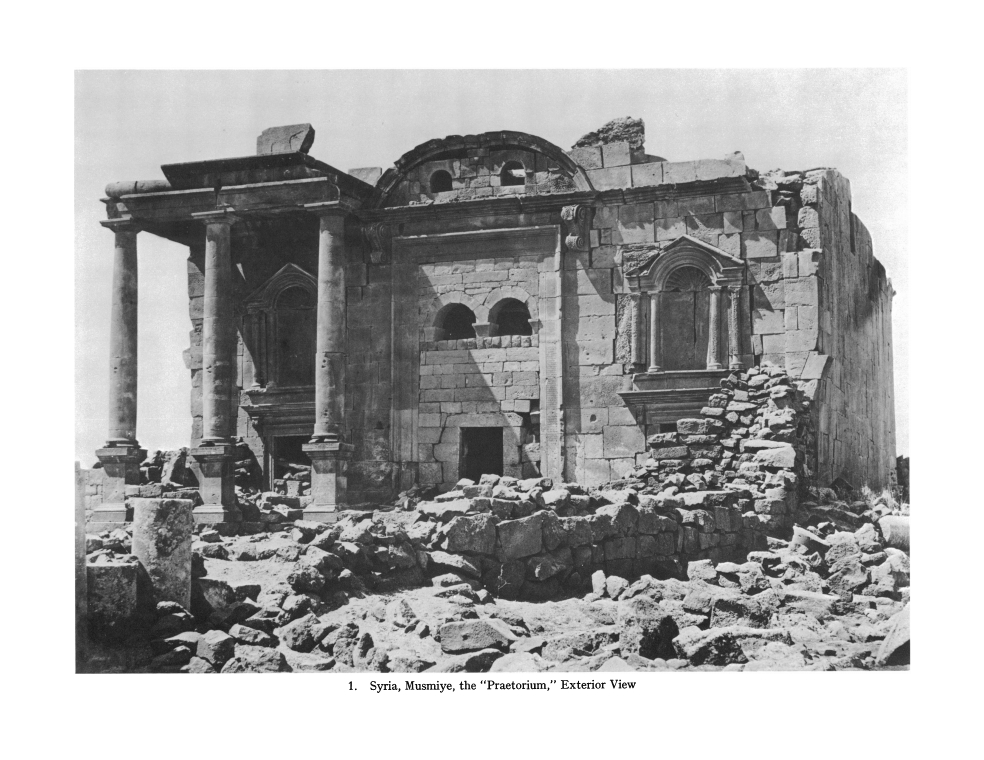
Outer view of the supposed praetorium at Musmiye, Syria, demolished in 1890
