= March 2025 Daraa clashes =

Clashes following the Syrian civil war

- Part of the Western Syria clashes and the Aftermath of the Syrian civil war
Date	4 March 2025 – 6 March 2025 (2 days)
Location	As-Sanamayn, Daraa governorate, Syria
Status	Syrian government victory

Belligerents
(Syria) Syrian caretaker government	(Ba'athist Syria) Assad loyalists

Commanders and leaders
(Syria) Ahmed al-Sharaa (Syria) Murhaf Abu Qasra (Syria) Ali Noureddine al-Naasan (Syria) Anas Khattab	(Ba'athist Syria) Mohsen al-Haymed (Ba'athist Syria) Ahmad al-Labbad

Units involved
Syrian Armed Forces; (Syria) General Security Services	(Ba'athist Syria) Mohsen al-Haymed's group (Ba'athist Syria) Ahmad al-Labbad's group

Casualties and losses
(Syria) 8 security forces killed (Note: 3 killed on 5 March)	(Ba'athist Syria) 9 militants killed (Note: 3 killed on 4 March 1 killed on 5 March) (Ba'athist Syria) Unknown
- 2 civilians killed and 3 injured

The March 2025 Daraa clashes began in As-Sanamayn on 4 March 2025 between pro-Assad forces and led to the intervention of internal security and the Ministry of Defense.

== Background ==
Some of the Assad loyalists are reportedly affiliated with Mohsen al-Haymed, who was a member of the Military Security Directorate in the Syrian Arab Army, while others were affiliated with Ahmad al-Labbad, who formerly worked for the General Intelligence Directorate.

Clashes had taken place in January 2025 in As-Sanamayn between a group affiliated with Haimed and the Southern Operations Room.

== Timeline ==
Members of al-Haymed's group, after leaving a funeral, had engaged with gunmen, who were reportedly part of a group led by Ahmad al-Labbad. Three members of al-Haymed's group died as a result of the attack, while one member and a child were injured. General Security Services arrived to restore order, but al-Haymed's group opened fire, wounding one officer, which led to clashes taking place between al-Haymed's group and security forces.

Eight security forces were killed in total, with three dying on 5 March. Two civilians also died. Nine members of al-Haymed's group died.

60 militants were arrested as a result, though al-Haymed escaped the raid.
