= Masharah =

Town in southern Syria

Masharah مسحرة
- village
- Location within Syria
- Coordinates: 33°08′12″N 35°57′50″E
- PAL: 240/282
- Country: Syria
- Governorate: Quneitra

Population (2010 estimation)
  - Total: 3,200
- Time zone: UTC+2 (EET)
  - Summer (DST): UTC+3 (EEST)

Masharah (Arabic: مسحرة), also spelt Mashara, is a village in southwestern Syria, administratively part of the Quneitra Governorate.

== History ==
Masharah is situated in the historical region of Gaulanitis. Archaeological findings in the modern town include architectural fragments, sculptured reliefs, altars, and column heads, possibly originating in the area's ancient Ituraean population. Among the remains is a basalt lintel decorated with a high relief of two gods and a goddess, along with other decorations. Additionally, multiple inscriptions were found in the town, mostly made of basalt, featuring Greek inscriptions, and dating from the 2nd to the 7th century.

=== Ottoman era ===
In 1596 it appeared as Mashara in the Ottoman tax registers, situated in the nahiya of Jaydur, part of Hauran Sanjak. It had an entirely Muslim population consisting of 14 households and 6 bachelors. They paid a fixed tax-rate of 40% on agricultural products, such as wheat (570 a.), barley (380 a.), summer crops (540 a.), goats and beehives (200 a.); in addition to "occasional revenues" (200 a.); a total of 2,000 akçe.

Transhumance shaped settlement in the Golan for centuries because of its harsh winters. The winters "forced tribespeople until the 19th century to live in hundreds of rudimentary 'winter villages' in their tribal territory. Starting in the second part of the 19th century, settlement in villages like Ghadir al-Bustan became "fixed and formed the nucleus of fully sedentary life in the 20th century Golan." According to the mayor, the first houses in the village were constructed in the 1920s, with a population of around 50 people. By 2010, the population had reportedly grown to approximately 3,200.

== Bibliography ==
- Hütteroth, W.-D.; Abdulfattah, K. (1977). Historical Geography of Palestine, Transjordan and Southern Syria in the Late 16th Century. Erlanger Geographische Arbeiten, Sonderband 5. Erlangen, Germany: Vorstand der Fränkischen Geographischen Gesellschaft. ISBN 3-920405-41-2.
