= Abu Shaqra =

Abu Shaqra (Arabic: أبو شقرا [ALA-LC: Abū Shaqrā], also anglicized as Abou Chacra, Abou Chakra, Oboshqra and other variants) is the surname of:

- Abdulaziz Oboshqra, Saudi footballer
- Valerie Abou Chacra, Lebanese beauty pageant titleholder
