= Tubna, Syria =

Village in southern Syria

Tubna تبنة Tubnah
- Village
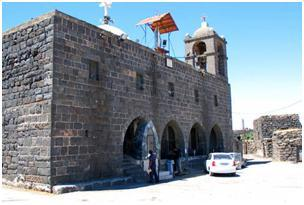
- St. George Church in Tubna, 2009

- Location in Syria
- Coordinates: 32°59′33″N 36°13′0.8″E
- Grid position: 264/266
- Country: Syria
- Governorate: Daraa
- District: Sanamayn
- Subdistrict: Sanamayn
- Elevation: 650 m (2,130 ft)

Population (2004 census)
  - Total: 1,272
- Time zone: UTC+3 (AST)

Tubna (Arabic: تبنة, also spelled Tubnah) is a village in southern Syria, administratively part of the as-Sanamayn District in the Daraa Governorate. It is situated 650 meters (2,130 ft) above sea level, about 58 km south of Damascus and 42 km north of Daraa, in the Hauran plain. According to the Syria Central Bureau of Statistics (CBS), Tubna had a population of 1,272 in the 2004 census. Its inhabitants are predominantly Melkite Greek Catholic Christians.

== Etymology ==
Tubna is a word derived from the word ‘tibn’ (straw), due to the abundance of livestock there.

== History ==
=== Early history ===
A Greek inscription reused as a lintel in a village house was initially interpreted as referring to a Tychaion, that is a shrine of Tyche, the Greek goddess of fortune. Following a re-examination of the text in 2016, however, it was proposed that it more likely records the dedication of a representation of Tyche, rather than the existence of a sanctuary.

Tubna was the seat of a Monophysite monastery by the second half of the 6th century. The Byzantine Empire’s Ghassanid Arab vassals apparently maintained a presence in Tubna as evidenced by a verse by the contemporary poet al-Nabigha that placed the tomb of the Ghassanid emir between “Tubna and Jasim”. Moreover, the Ghassanids were adamant supporters of the Monophysite church and their relationship with Tubna may have been based on their support for its monastery.

The Syrian geographer Yaqut al-Hamawi noted in the 1220s that Tubna was "a town of the Hauran, belonging to the Damascus Province".

=== Ottoman era ===
In 1596, Tubna appeared in the Ottoman tax registers as Tibna and was part of the nahiya (subdistrict) of Bani Kilab in the Hauran Sanjak. It had an entirely Muslim population consisting of 30 households and 25 bachelors. The villagers paid a fixed tax rate of 40% on wheat, barley, summer crops, goats and beehives; a total of 16,460 akçe. 2,5/24 of the revenue went to a waqf.

In 1838, Tibny was noted as a Muslim village, situated "in the Nukra, north of ash-Shaykh Miskin".

== Demographics ==
The people of this area are known to be part of the Ghassanid Christian tribes that immigrated from Yemen to the Hauran region of southern Syria in the early 3rd century CE, where they established the Kingdom of the Ghassanids. The inhabitants are predominantly Melkite Greek Catholics. The village is one of the few Melkite villages that straddle the hills separating the Hauran plain and Jabal al-Druze massif.

In 2011, the Melkite Greek Catholic Church had approximately 4,500 believers.

Families: Al-Khalil, Al-Qabalan/Kabalan, Al-Eid, Saoub, Al-Rasheed, Ajjouri, Shanaa, Khunaifis, Al-Salameh, Sawaya, Al-Dakhil, Al-Qaid/Kaid, Al-Jaber, Al-Khoury, Shahadeh, Al-Masarra, Al-Salloum, Al-Issa, Al-Jebran, Al-Yousef, Al-Sulaim, Al-Awadh, Al-Kayed, Al-Duhaim, Al-Sulaiman, Al-Hilal, Jaradah, Al-Farhan, Maalouf, Al-Mousa, Al-Fazzaa, Ibrahim, Shdaydeh, Al-Harithi.

== Religious buildings ==
- St. George Melkite Greek Catholic Church

== See also ==
- Christians in Syria

== Bibliography ==
- Hütteroth, W.-D.; Abdulfattah, K. (1977). Historical Geography of Palestine, Transjordan and Southern Syria in the Late 16th Century. Erlanger Geographische Arbeiten, Sonderband 5. Erlangen, Germany: Vorstand der Fränkischen Geographischen Gesellschaft. ISBN 3-920405-41-2.
- Le Strange, G. (1890). Palestine Under the Moslems: A Description of Syria and the Holy Land from A.D. 650 to 1500. Committee of the Palestine Exploration Fund.
- Mazzilli, Francesca (2018). Rural Cult Centres in the Hauran: Part of the broader network of the Near East (100 BC–AD 300). Archaeopress. pp. 164–165. doi:10.2307/j.ctvndv916. ISBN 978-1-78491-954-2.
- Robinson, E.; Smith, E. (1841). Biblical Researches in Palestine, Mount Sinai and Arabia Petraea: A Journal of Travels in the year 1838. Vol. 3. Boston: Crocker & Brewster.
