= Tancrède Dumas =

Italian photographer

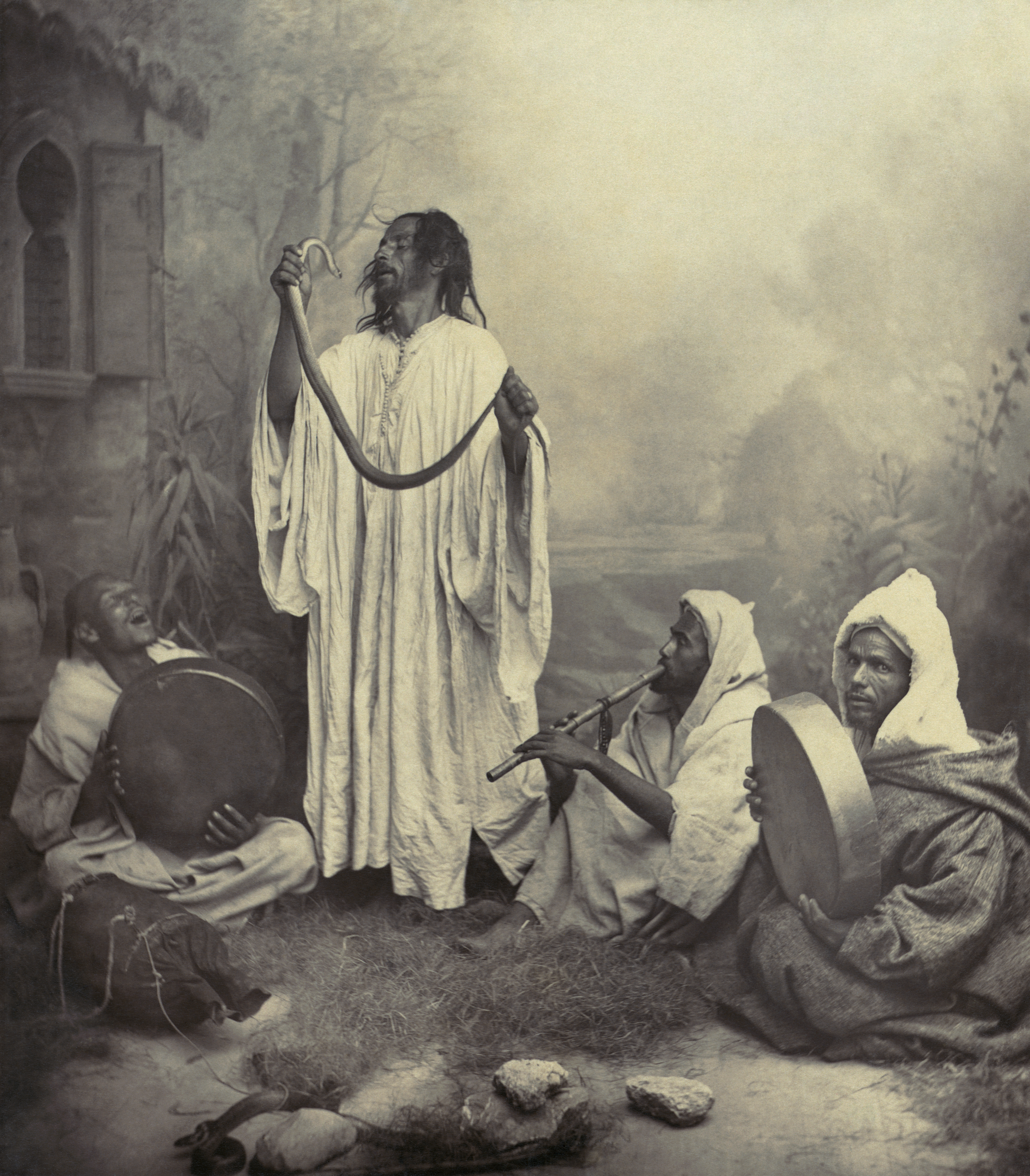
Snake charmers photographed by Tancrède Dumas in Tangier, Morocco.

Tancrède Dumas (1830–1905) was an Italian photographer of French descent who was active in the Near East. He learned photography in Florence and opened a studio in Beirut in 1860. He was active during the period 1860-1890 and worked in albumen prints. Dumas travelled with the Grand Duke Mecklenburg-Schwerin, inspiring him to use the title "Photographer to the Imperial and Royal Court of Prussia" on his return to Lebanon.
