= Jasim =

Jasim جاسم Jasem, Jassem
- City
- Location within Syria
- Coordinates: 32°59′32″N 36°03′36″E
- Grid position: 249/266 PAL
- Country: Syria
- Governorate: Daraa
- District: Izraa
- Subdistrict: Jasim
- Elevation: 747 m (2,451 ft)

Population (2004)
  - Total: 31,683
- Time zone: UTC+2 (EET)
  - Summer (DST): UTC+3 (EEST)

Jasim (Arabic: جاسم, also spelled Jasem or Jassem) is a city in the Izraa District of the Daraa Governorate in southern Syria. It is located 41 kilometers north of Daraa, near Nawa to the south, Kafr Shams to the north, Inkhil to the northeast and al-Harra to the northwest. According to the Syria Central Bureau of Statistics (CBS), Jasim had a population of 31,683 in the 2004 census. It is the administrative center of a nahiyah ("subdistrict") consisting of two localities with a combined population of 39,624 in the 2004 census. Its inhabitants are predominantly Sunni Muslims.

== History ==
=== Late antiquity ===
The village is recorded as Gasimeas (Γασιμεάς) in the Diocletianic boundary stones corpus, dated to c. 300 CE.

Jasim appears as Gashmai (Hebrew: גשמי) in the Mosaic of Rehob as a town in the territory of Naveh (modern Nawa). It is also referenced in the Tosefta and the Jerusalem Talmud.

During the Byzantine period, Jasim was a seat of the Monophysite church in 570. It was controlled and populated by the Ghassanid Arabs, a vassal kingdom of the Byzantine Empire. There were five monasteries affiliated with the Monophysites located in the town. The Ghassanid king Nu'man was buried in between Jasim and nearby Tubna.

=== Middle Ages ===
The 10th-century Arab historian al-Masudi wrote that Jasim belonged to Damascus and was located "between Damascus and the Jordan Province, in a district called al-Khaulan. Jasim is a few miles from al-Jabiya, and from the territory of Nawa, where is the Pasturage of Ayyub."

Jasim was visited by Arab geographer Yaqut al-Hamawi in the early 13th century under Ayyubid rule. Al-Hamawi wrote that the place was named after "Jasim, son of Iram ibn Sam (Shem) ibn Nuh (Noah) who visited it at the time of the destruction of the Tower of Babel." He further noted that Jasim was a town in Damascus Province, "lying 8 leagues from Damascus, on the right of the high-road to Tabbariyah (Tiberias)."

=== Ottoman period ===
In 1596 Jasim appeared in the Ottoman tax registers being in the nahiya of Jaydur in the Hauran Sanjak. It had an entirely Muslim population consisting of 28 households and 14 bachelors. The villagers paid a fixed tax-rate of 40% on wheat, barley and summer crops; a total of 11,300 akçe. Half of the revenue went to a waqf.

Many of the inhabitants of nearby al-Harra originate from Jasim. The city is home to the Arab tribe of al-Halqiyyin. Prominent 20th-century Arab socialist leader Akram al-Hawrani descends from the tribe, members of which settled in Homs. In the 1870s Gottlieb Schumacher noted that Jasim was one of the largest villages in its region with a population of 1,000 living in 215 huts. He reported finding several ancient remains, particularly stone crosses from the Byzantine era.

=== Civil war ===
On 18 March 2011, Jasim was among the first cities to participate in large-scale protests during the Syrian uprising against the government. Further mass protests were reported on 22 April. On 1 April 2012, four Syrian Army soldiers were killed in clashes with rebel Free Syrian Army gunmen in Jasim according to the Syrian Observatory for Human Rights. On 15 January 2014, rebels were in control of Jasim. On 17 July 2018, the Syrian army captured the town.

== Religious buildings ==
- The Great Mosque (also known as the Stone Mosque; oldest)
- Abu Bakr al-Siddiq Mosque
- Umar ibn al-Khattab Mosque
- Khalid ibn al-Walid Mosque
- al-Ansar Mosque
- Al-Rahman Mosque
- Al-Nassar Mosque
- Hamza Mosque
- Al-Muhajirin Mosque

== Notable people ==
- Abu Tammam, Abbasid era Arab poet.
- Wael Nader al-Halqi, former Prime Minister of Syria.

== Bibliography ==
- Batatu, H. (1999). Syria's peasantry, the descendants of its lesser rural notables, and their politics (Illustrated ed.). Princeton University Press. ISBN 0691002541.
- Hütteroth, W.-D.; Abdulfattah, K. (1977). Historical Geography of Palestine, Transjordan and Southern Syria in the Late 16th Century. Erlanger Geographische Arbeiten, Sonderband 5. Erlangen, Germany: Vorstand der Fränkischen Geographischen Gesellschaft. ISBN 3-920405-41-2.
- Le Strange, G. (1890). Palestine Under the Moslems: A Description of Syria and the Holy Land from A.D. 650 to 1500. Committee of the Palestine Exploration Fund.
- Schumacher, G. (1897). "Notes from Jedur". Quarterly Statement - Palestine Exploration Fund. 29: 190–195.
- Shahid, I. (2002). Byzantium and the Arabs in the Sixth Century: pt. 1, Toponymy, Monuments, Historical Geography, and Frontier Studies. Dumbarton Oaks Research Library and Collection. ISBN 0884022145.
