= Ghabaghib =

Town in Syria

Ghabaghib غَبَاغِب
- Town
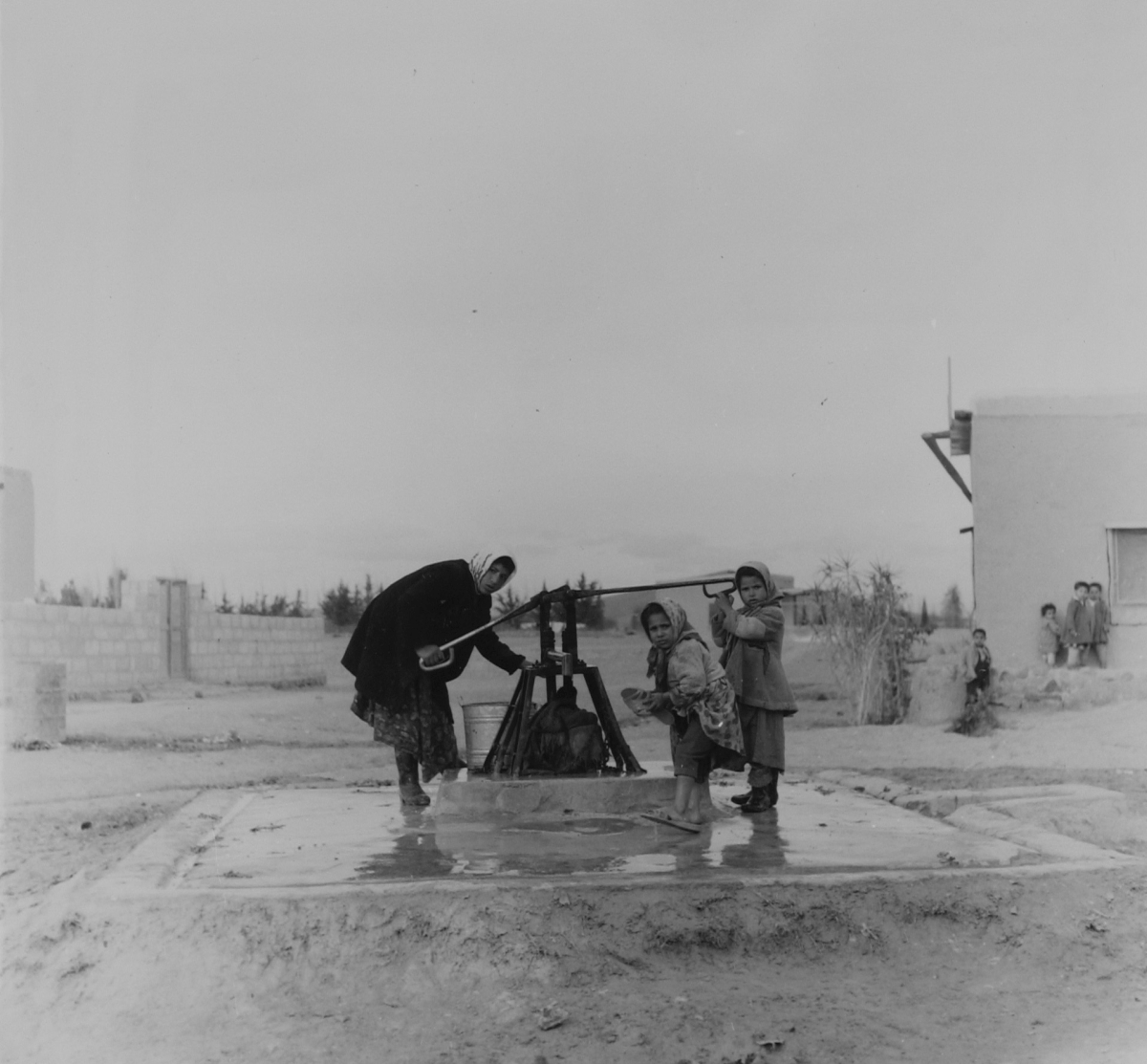
- Water well, Ghabaghib, 1965

- Location within Syria
- Coordinates: 33°11′2″N 36°13′35″E
- Grid position: 264/287
- Country: Syria
- Governorate: Daraa
- District: Al-Sanamayn
- Subdistrict: Ghabaghib
- Elevation: 710 m (2,329 ft)

Population (2004 census)
  - Total: 11,802
- Time zone: UTC+3 (AST)

Ghabaghib (Arabic: غَبَاغِب Ġabāġib; also spelled Ghabagheb) is a town in southern Syria, administratively part of the Daraa Governorate, located north of Daraa. Nearby localities include Muthabin to the southeast, al-Sanamayn to the south, Deir al-Bukht, Deir al-Adas to the east, Khan Dannun to the north and al-Qin to the northwest.

According to the Syria Central Bureau of Statistics (CBS), Ghabaghib had a population of 11,802 in the 2004 census. The town is also the administrative center of the Ghabaghib nahiyah which consists of thirteen villages with a combined population of 45,793.

== History ==
=== Ayyubid period ===
On 16 January 1192, news reached Jerusalem that Alam al-Din Sulayman, an emir ("commander") of Ayyubid general Saladin, had died in Ghabaghib on his way to Aleppo. Later, in the early 13th-century, the town was visited by Syrian geographer Yaqut al-Hamawi who noted that it was "a village in the nearer districts of Hauran, 6 leagues from Damascus."

=== Ottoman period ===
A tower was built in the town on the orders of Ottoman Sultan, Selim I. In 1596, Ghabagib appeared in the Ottoman tax registers being part of the nahiya (subdistrict) of Bani Kilab in the Qada of Hauran. It had an entirely Muslim population consisting of 6 households and 5 bachelors. The villagers paid a fixed tax rate of 25% on various agricultural products, including wheat, barley, summer crops, goats and/or beehives; a total of 2,000 akçe.

In 1838, Ghabaghib was noted as a Muslim village, situated in the Nuqra (southern Hauran plain) north of al-Shaykh Maskin. In the mid-19th-century, Ghabaghib was a small village with structures built of black basalt stone. The town, situated along the Hajj caravan route between Damascus and Mecca, served as an intermediate rest stop between Khan Dannun and al-Sanamayn. Ghabaghib later became a station on the Damascus–Daraa line of the Hejaz Railway. During the Syria–Lebanon Campaign in World War II, Ghabaghib served as the headquarters for the Free French Forces in southern Syria. The town was nicknamed "Rhubarb" by British soldiers who found the name too difficult to pronounce.

In 1906, the traveler William Ewing noted that "At Ghabaghib ... great cisterns and scattered ruins tell of an important place in times past."

== Bibliography ==
- Beke, C.T. (1862). "Notes on an Excursion to Harrān, in Padan-Aram, and Thence over Mount Gilead and the Jordan, to Shechem". Journal of the Royal Geographical Society of London. 32. Wiley-Blackwell: 76–100. doi:10.2307/1798402. JSTOR 1798402.
- Ewing, William (1907). Arab and Druze at home. T. C. & E. C. Jack.
- Hütteroth, W.-D.; Abdulfattah, K. (1977). Historical Geography of Palestine, Transjordan and Southern Syria in the Late 16th Century. Erlanger Geographische Arbeiten, Sonderband 5. Erlangen, Germany: Vorstand der Fränkischen Geographischen Gesellschaft. ISBN 3-920405-41-2.
- Ibn al-Athīr (2007). Donald Sidney Richards (ed.). The Chronicle of Ibn Al-Athīr for the Crusading Period from Al-Kāmil Fīʼl-taʼrīkh: The years 541–589. Ashgate Publishing, Ltd. ISBN 9780754640783.
- Le Strange, G. (1890). Palestine Under the Moslems: A Description of Syria and the Holy Land from A.D. 650 to 1500. Committee of the Palestine Exploration Fund.
- Masterman, E.W.G. (1897). "The Damascus Railways". Quarterly Statement - Palestine Exploration Fund. 29 (3): 198–200. doi:10.1179/peq.1897.29.3.198.
- Newbold, Captain (1846). "On the Site of Ashtaroth". Journal of the Royal Geographical Society of London. 16. Wiley-Blackwell: 331–338. doi:10.2307/1798240. JSTOR 1798240.
- Robinson, E.; Smith, E. (1841). Biblical Researches in Palestine, Mount Sinai and Arabia Petraea: A Journal of Travels in the year 1838. Vol. 3. Boston: Crocker & Brewster.
- Smith, Colin (2009). England's last war against France: fighting Vichy 1940-1942. Weidenfeld & Nicolson. ISBN 9780297852186.
