= Deir al-Adas =

Deir al-Adas دير العدس
- Village
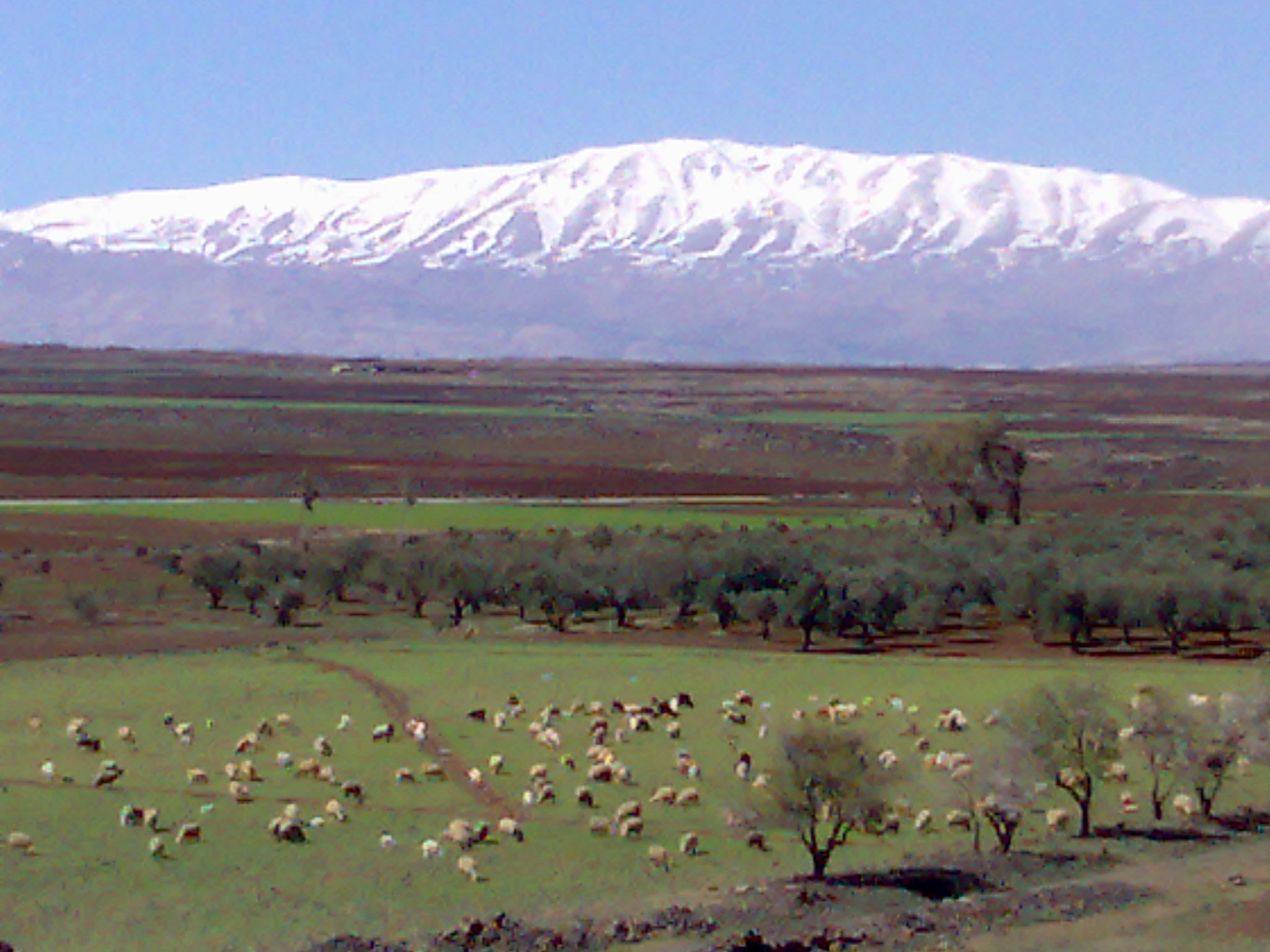
- Deir al-Adas with Mount Hermon in the background

- Location within Syria
- Coordinates: 33°9′38″N 36°7′28″E
- Grid position: 255/285 PAL
- Country: Syria
- Governorate: Daraa Governorate
- District: Al-Sanamayn District
- Nahiyah: Ghabaghib
- Elevation: 800 m (2,600 ft)

Population (2004 census)
  - Total: 3,273
- Time zone: UTC+3 (AST)
- Website: http://www.discover-syria.com/

Deir al-Adas (Arabic: دير العدس Dayr al-ʿAdas) is a village in southern Syria, administratively part of the Daraa Governorate. It is situated about 40 kilometers northwest of Daraa. According to the Central Bureau of Statistics (CBS), it had a population of 3,723.

The name literally means "Monastery (deir) of the Lentils (al-ʿadas)".

== History ==
In 1838, Deir al-Adas was noted as a village in the el-Jeidur district.

== Civil War ==
On 10 June 2022, eleven farmworkers were killed after a landmine exploded underneath their car in the village.

== See also ==
- Hauran

== Bibliography ==
- Robinson, E.; Smith, E. (1841). Biblical Researches in Palestine, Mount Sinai and Arabia Petraea: A Journal of Travels in the year 1838. Vol. 3. Boston: Crocker & Brewster.
