= Tell al-Hara =

Highest point in the Daraa Governorate of Syria

- Harith al-Jawlan, Jabal Harith
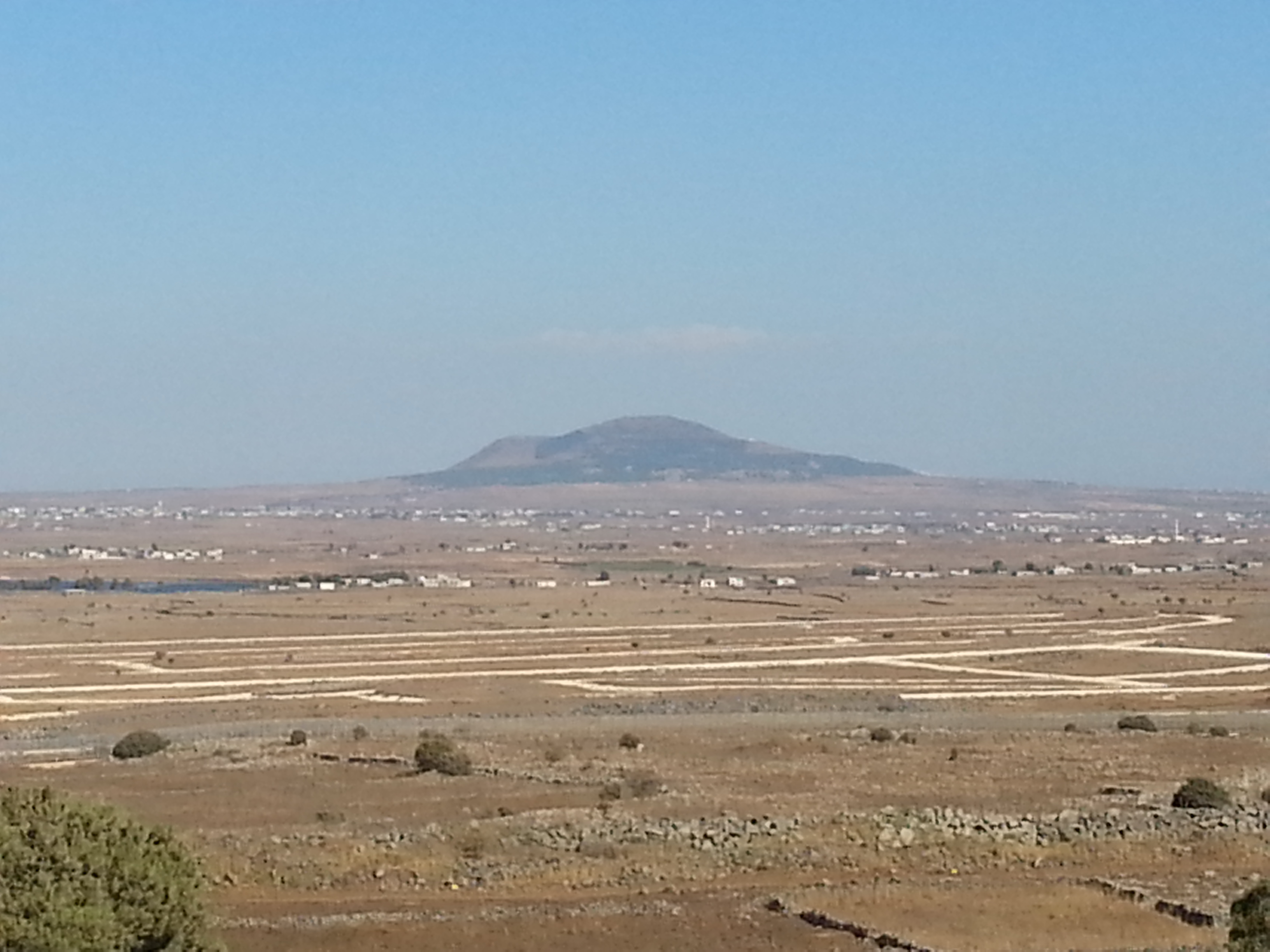
- Tell al-Hara from the west, 2014

Highest point
- Elevation: 1,127 m (3,698 ft)
- Coordinates: 33°3′46″N 35°59′31″E

Geography
- Location within Syria
- Location: Al-Sanamayn District, Daraa Governorate, Syria

Geology
- Mountain type: Conical hill

Tell al-Ḥāra, formerly known as Ḥārith al-Jawlān or Jabal Ḥārith, is the highest point in the Daraa Governorate. During the Arab–Israeli conflict and the Syrian Civil War, it has served as a highly strategic military position because it overlooks wide areas of the Golan Heights and Hauran regions. The closest population center is the town of al-Hara, located at the hill's southeastern foot.

== Description ==
Tell al-Hara is a conical-shaped hill with an elevation of 1,127 meters (3,698 ft) above sea level. Like the neighboring hills, Tell al-Hara belongs to the range of extinct volcanoes of the Jaydur region and a wide crater opens at its summit. It is the highest point in the Daraa Governorate, and overlooks the Hauran plain.

At the southeastern foot of Tell al-Hara is the town of al-Hara. Damascus is 50 kilometers north of Tell al-Hara, the governorate capital Daraa is 55 kilometers to the south, the district capital al-Sanamayn is 18 kilometers to the east and the Israeli-occupied Golan Heights is 12 kilometers to the west. Near the southern foot of Tell al-Hara begins the Nahr al-Allan river, which terminates near the border with Jordan.

== Name ==
Tell al-Hara was known as "Jabal Ḥārith" in the late Byzantine era. It was named after the Ghassanid king al-Harith and was referred to as "Ḥārith al-Jawlān" by the contemporary Arab poets al-Nabigha and Hassan ibn Thabit. The modern name of the tell and the town at its foot, "al-Ḥāra", is a "mutilated" version of its Ghassanid name "al-Ḥārith", according to historian Irfan Shahîd. The tomb of the Ghassanid king al-Nu'man ibn al-Harith was said to be located at the summit of Tell al-Hara by al-Nabigha, though the scholarly consensus places al-Nu'man's tomb in the village of al-Hara.

== History ==
In the 1890s, the German archaeologist Gottlieb Schumacher noted that the tomb of a certain Muslim saint, Umar al-Shahid, "crowned" Tell al-Hara. He also noted that at the hill's western foot were the ruins of a Christian monastery known as Deir al-Saj, which he suspected was of Ghassanid origin.

Following Israel's occupation of the Golan Heights in 1967, Tell al-Hara served as a strategic Syrian reconnaissance point overlooking the Golan Heights. It was captured by Syrian rebel forces fighting under the banners of the Free Syrian Army (FSA) and Jabhat al-Nusra from the 7th Armored Division, one of the largest armored brigades of the Syrian Arab Army (SAA) in southern Syria, on 5 October 2015, partially as a result of the apparent defection of SAA general Mahmoud Abu Araj. Tell al-Hara's capture paved the way for the rebels' capture of much of the western Daraa Governorate and the southern Quneitra Governorate. They held Tell al-Hara for about four years until Syrian government forces retook control of the hill on 7 July 2018 after a two-day battle. Rebels apparently recaptured it before surrendering the hill to government forces in a reconciliation agreement on 16 July.

On 8 December 2024, after Israel launched an invasion of Syria amid the fall of the Assad regime, Al Arabiya reported that Israel had taken control of Tell al-Hara.

== Bibliography ==
- Ma'oz, Zvi Uri (2008). The Ghassānids and the Fall of the Golan Synagogues. Archaostyle.
- Schumacher, G. (1897). "Notes from Jedur". Quarterly Statement - Palestine Exploration Fund. 29 (3): 190–195. doi:10.1179/peq.1897.29.3.190.
- Schumacher, Gottlieb (1886). Across the Jordan: Being an Exploration and Survey of Part of Hauran and Jaulan. London: Richard Bentley and Son.
- Shahîd, I. (2002). Byzantium and the Arabs in the Sixth Century, Vol. 2, Part 1. Washington, D. C.: Dumbarton Oaks Research Library and Collection. ISBN 0-88402-284-6.
