= Shaqra, Daraa =

Village in Syria

Shaqra شقرا
- Village
- Location in Syria
- Coordinates: 32°54′25″N 36°14′15″E
- Grid position: 266/257 PAL
- Country: Syria
- Governorate: Daraa
- District: Izraa
- Subdistrict: Izraa

Population (2004 census)
  - Total: 487
- City Qrya Pcode: C6099

Shaqra (Arabic: شقرا) is a village in southern Syria, administratively part of the Izraa District in the Daraa Governorate. According to the Syria Central Bureau of Statistics (CBS), Shaqra had a population of 487 in the 2004 census. Its inhabitants are predominantly Christian, with a Sunni Muslim minority.

== History ==
In 1596, Shaqra appeared in the Ottoman tax registers named Saqra; part of the nahiya of Bani Kilab in the Hauran Sanjak. It had an entirely Muslim population consisting of 12 households and 7 bachelors. The villagers paid a fixed tax rate of 40% on various agricultural products, including wheat (3600 akçe), barley (1800), summer crops (1800), goats and beehives (460), in addition to "occasional revenues" (500); a total of 8,160 akçe. 1/3 of the revenue went to a waqf.

In 1838, it was noted as a Sunni Muslim village, situated "in the Luhf, west of the Lejah".

== Demographics ==
In 2011, the Melkite Greek Catholic Church had approximately 2,300 believers.

== Religious buildings ==
- Our Lady of the Annunciation Melkite Greek Catholic Church (Old Church)
- Our Lady of the Annunciation Melkite Greek Catholic Church (New Church)
- Abu Dharr al-Ghifari Mosque (outside of the village)

== Bibliography ==
- Hütteroth, W.-D.; Abdulfattah, K. (1977). Historical Geography of Palestine, Transjordan and Southern Syria in the Late 16th Century. Erlanger Geographische Arbeiten, Sonderband 5. Erlangen, Germany: Vorstand der Fränkischen Geographischen Gesellschaft. ISBN 3-920405-41-2.
- Robinson, E.; Smith, E. (1841). Biblical Researches in Palestine, Mount Sinai and Arabia Petraea: A Journal of Travels in the year 1838. Vol. 3. Boston: Crocker & Brewster.
