= Jabab =

Jabab جباب
- Village
- Location in Syria
- Coordinates: 33°6′36″N 36°15′55″E
- Grid position: 268/279
- Country: Syria
- Governorate: Daraa
- District: Al-Sanamayn District
- Subdistrict: Ghabaghib

Population (2004)
  - Total: 7,699
- Time zone: UTC+3 (AST)
- City Qrya Pcode: C6086

Jabab (Arabic: جباب) is a Syrian village located in Al-Sanamayn District, Daraa. According to the Syria Central Bureau of Statistics (CBS), Jabab had a population of 7,699 in the 2004 census.

== History ==
In 1838, it was noted as a Sunni Muslim village, situated "the Nukra, north of Al-Shaykh Maskin".

== Bibliography ==
- Robinson, E.; Smith, E. (1841). Biblical Researches in Palestine, Mount Sinai and Arabia Petraea: A Journal of Travels in the year 1838. Vol. 3. Boston: Crocker & Brewster.
