= Kafr Shams =

Kafr Shams كفر شمس
- Town
- Location within Syria
- Coordinates: 33°07′03″N 36°06′16″E
- Grid position: 253/280 PAL
- Country: Syria
- Governorate: Daraa
- District: Sanamayn
- Subdistrict: Sanamayn
- Elevation: 800 m (2,600 ft)

Population (2004 census)
  - Total: 12,435
- Time zone: UTC+3 (AST)

Kafr Shams (Arabic: كفر شمس, also spelled Kfar Shams or Kafr ash-Shams) is a town in southern Syria administratively belonging to the as-Sanamayn District of the Daraa Governorate. It is 16 kilometers (9.9 mi) northwest of as-Sanamayn, just east of the Golan Heights and situated between Damascus and Daraa. According to the Syria Central Bureau of Statistics (CBS), Kafr Shams had a population of 12,435 in the 2004 census. The town's inhabitants are predominantly Sunni Muslims.

== History ==
=== Byzantine period ===
Kafr Shams experienced a construction boom during the rule of the Byzantine Empire, particularly during the reign of Justinian I, mostly focused on large rural housing. The town was dominated by the Ghassanids, an Arab Christian vassal kingdom of the Byzantines. The Ghassanids built a major Monophysite monastery there around 570 CE.

=== Ottoman era ===
In 1838, Kefr Shems was noted as a village in the el-Jeidur district.

In 1897, German archaeologist Gottlieb Schumacher reported Kafr Shams had a population of 600 Muslims living in 120 to 130 huts. Ancient ruins and subterranean arches were noted in the village and the two Ghassanid monasteries were still largely intact.

=== Modern era ===
During the 1973 Yom Kippur War, Kafr Shams was the scene of clashes between the Israeli Army and the joint forces of the Jordanian, Iraqi and Syrian armies.

==== Civil war ====
Many residents of Kafr Shams participated in protests against the Syrian government as part of the Syrian revolution.

== Religious buildings ==
- Old Mosque
- Khalid ibn al-Walid Mosque
- Usama ibn Zayd Mosque
- Abu Bakr al-Siddiq Mosque

== See also ==
- Hauran

== Bibliography ==
- Banaji, Jairus (2007). Agrarian Change in Late Antiquity: Gold, Labour, and Aristocratic Dominance. Oxford University Press. ISBN 978-0199226030.
- Robinson, E.; Smith, E. (1841). Biblical Researches in Palestine, Mount Sinai and Arabia Petraea: A Journal of Travels in the year 1838. Vol. 3. Boston: Crocker & Brewster.
- Schumacher, G. (1897). "Notes from Jedur". Quarterly Statement - Palestine Exploration Fund. 29: 190–195. doi:10.1179/peq.1897.29.3.190.
- Shahid, I. (2002). Byzantium and the Arabs in the Sixth Century: pt. 1, Toponymy, Monuments, Historical Geography, and Frontier Studies. Dumbarton Oaks Research Library and Collection. ISBN 0884022145.
