= As-Sanamayn =

As-Sanamayn ٱلصَّنَمَيْن As-Sanamain, As-Sanamein
- City
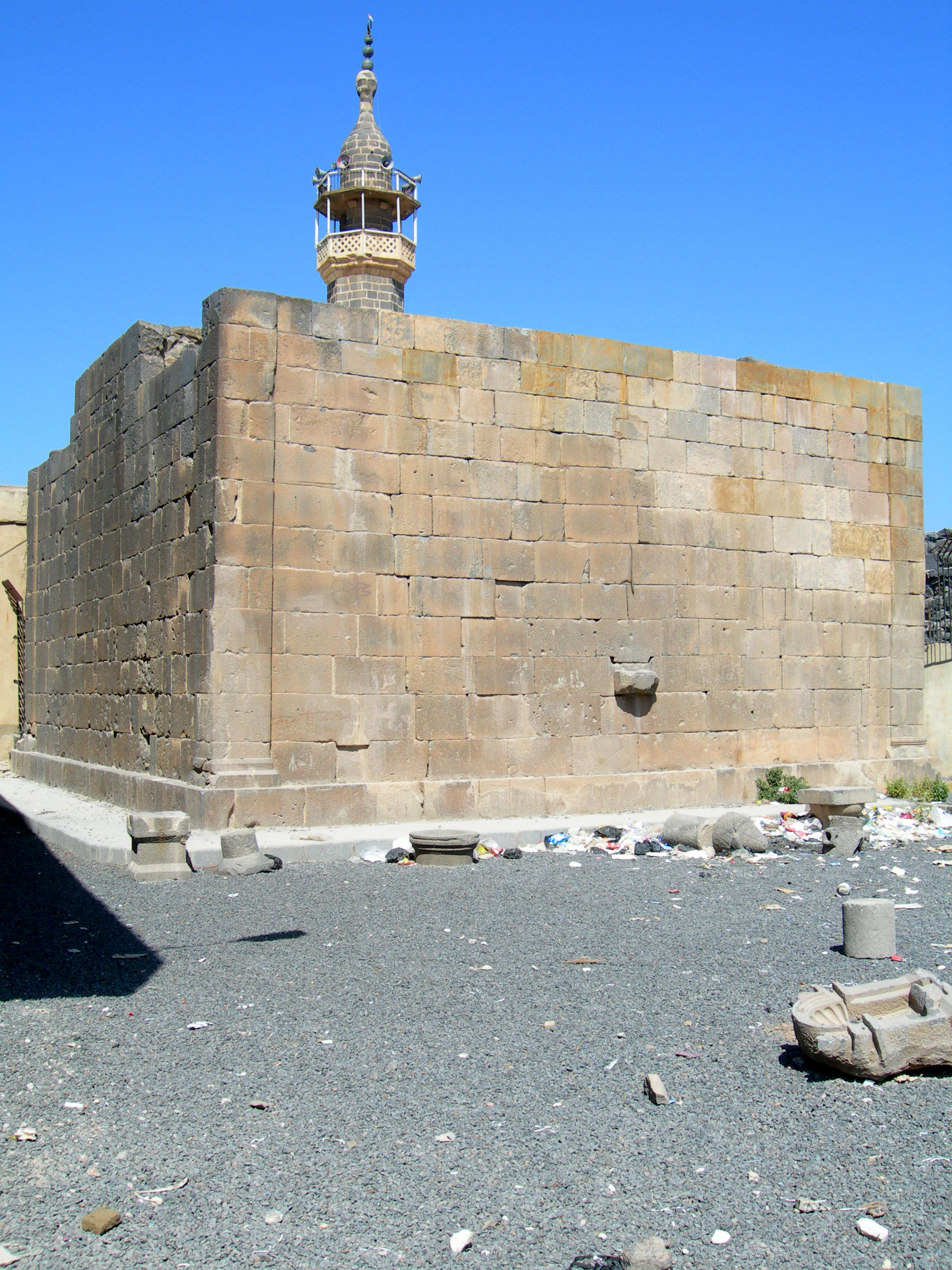
- The remains of the 2nd-century Roman temple of Tyche in as-Sanamayn, 2008

- Location in Syria
- Coordinates: 33°04′16″N 36°11′3″E
- Grid position: 260/275 PAL
- Country: Syria
- Governorate: Daraa
- District: Sanamayn
- Subdistrict: Sanamayn
- Elevation: 640 m (2,100 ft)

Population (2004 census)
  - Total: 26,268
- Time zone: UTC+3 (AST)

As-Sanamayn (Arabic: ٱلصَّنَمَيْن, romanized: aṣ-Ṣanamayn, also spelled Sanamain or Sanamein) is a city in southern Syria, administratively part of the Daraa Governorate and the center of as-Sanamayn District. It is located 55 kilometres (34 miles) north of Daraa and 50 kilometres (31 miles) south of Damascus. Nearby localities include Kafr Shams to the northwest, Deir al-Bukht to the north, Jabab to the northeast, Bassir to the east, Tubna to the southeast, Inkhil to the southwest and Qayta to the west. As-Sanamayn has an altitude of 640 metres (2,100 feet).

According to the Syria Central Bureau of Statistics (CBS), as-Sanamayn had a population of 26,268 in the 2004 census. In addition to being capital of the al-Sanamayn District, the city is also the administrative center and second largest locality of the al-Sanamayn nahiyah ("subdistrict") which consists of 16 localities with a collective population of 113,316 in 2004. The city's inhabitants are predominantly Sunni Muslims.

The city is administratively affiliated with many cities and towns such as Inkhil in the southwest, Qayta, Al-Hara and Aqraba in the west, Kafr Shams and Deir Al-Adas in the northwest, Kafr Nasij and Deir Al-Bakht in the north, Ghabagheb, Jabab and Muthabin in the northeast, Basir in the east, Khabab and Tubna in the southeast and Al-Qaniya in the south.

== Etymology ==
The name as-Sanamayn is Arabic for "the Two Idols."

Throughout its long history, the two idols have had several names, the last of which was its current name, which goes back to the presence of two distinct idols in the city during the Islamic conquest, so the city was named after these two statues.

== History ==
=== Roman period ===
As-Sanamayn has been identified with the Roman-era village of Aere, a station mentioned in the Antonine Itinerary on the road between Damascus to the north and Nawa to the south. A temple in as-Sanamayn dedicated to Tyche, the Greek goddess of fortune, has been dated to 191 CE. Another was apparently dedicated to Tyche's Roman equivalent, Fortuna, who was central to Bosra's state cult; it dates from the early to mid-3rd-century CE, during the reign of emperor Septimius Severus. A Batanean inscription from the reign of Roman emperor Julian the Apostate in the mid to late 4th-century was discovered in as-Sanamayn.

As-Sanamayn has also been associated with Bathyra, a village situated on the border between Batanaea and Trachonitis, where circa 7 BCE Herod established a Jewish Babylonian military colony under the leadership of Zamaris to safeguard the area from local brigands.

=== Medieval Islamic and Crusader period ===
As-Sanamayn had its own governor under Ikhshidid rule (939–969) until 945 when the Banu Uqayl was entrusted with governing the Hauran region.

A peace treaty between Baldwin I, the Crusader king of Jerusalem, and Toghtekin, the Muslim ruler of Damascus was signed at as-Sanamayn in 1111. The treaty was signed after a Crusader army pursuing Muslim forces to the Lejah was taken by surprise and surrounded at as-Sanamayn. In December 1168, a Zengid army was assembled at as-Sanamayn to launch an expedition towards Egypt to check the suspected independent ambitions of the Fatimid vizier Shirkuh, who was originally dispatched to Egypt by the Zengids to stave off a Crusader invasion. Zengid sultan Nur al-Din awarded each soldier 20 dinars before they departed.

The place was visited by medieval Syrian geographer Yaqut al-Hamawi in the 1220s during Ayyubid rule, and noted it was "a town in the Hauran, 2 marches from Damascus."

From the Middle Ages to the present day, the temple dedicated to Tyche was used as a mosque. Today it is also one of the best preserved Roman edifices in Syria.

=== Ottoman period ===
As in other towns on the Hajj (Muslim pilgrimage to Mecca) caravan route, the Ottoman sultan Selim I constructed a fortress in as-Sanamayn sometime between 1516 and 1520. Local janissaries were garrisoned at the fortress in as-Sanamayn in contrast to nearby Muzayrib, which was manned by imperial troops. In 1596 the town appeared in the Ottoman tax registers as Sanamayn and was part of the nahiya (subdistrict) of Bani Kilab in the Hauran Sanjak. It had an entirely Muslim population consisting of 80 households and 37 bachelors. The villagers paid a fixed tax-rate of 20% on various agricultural products, including wheat, barley, summer crops, goats and beehives, in addition to on a water mill. The total taxes were 18,900 akçe.

In 1672, the village contained a jama masjid (congregational mosque) with a minaret, two small mosques, a large khan (caravanserai) and hammam (bathhouse), but had no market. The Turkish traveler Evliya Çelebi noted that some prostitutes sought work by the roadside in as-Sanamayn.

In the mid-19th-century, explorer Josias Leslie Porter noted that the ruins of a few temples were present and that the most "striking building" was a Corinthian-style, ornamented limestone temple that had since been converted to a Christian church. In addition he noted "there are the remains of several large and beautiful buildings, and some of the houses are in the best style of Hauran architecture." Among the features of these structures were large walls, stone doors, roofs and window shutters and basalt character. During roughly the same time period it was reported by the Royal Geographical Society that as-Sanamayn was an entirely Muslim village with about 60 houses and with an entrance marked by large basalt blocks. It belonged to a Turkoman family known as Kawwas-oghlu who maintained encampments between the town and Khan Dannun to the north. As-Sanamayn was "well supplied with water," contained several bird species and its pools were filled with leeches which would be collected and sold in the markets of Damascus. In 1898 the Baedeker Palestine and Syria: Handbook for travellers noted it as "an excellent example of a Hauran village."

=== Modern period ===
==== 20th century ====
Towards the end of World War II the Free French forces maintained a headquarters at as-Sanamayn. Syria was ruled by the French Mandate at the time.

==== Civil war ====
As-Sanamayn was among the first cities to stage mass demonstrations against the government of Bashar al-Assad on 18 March 2011, joining other Hauran cities like Daraa, Inkhil, Jasim and Da'el. According to opposition activists security forces did not fire on demonstrators that day. On 25 March, however, 20 protesters were shot and killed by government forces after burning down a statue of late president Hafez al-Assad, the current president's father. An opposition activist in Damascus claimed that several protesters – as many as 20 according to some witnesses – were killed while attempting to march towards Daraa in a show of solidarity before being attacked by security forces, although that claim could not be confirmed. A government official claimed an armed group assaulted the Syrian Army headquarters in as-Sanamayn. The city also hosts the 15th Brigade of the Syrian Army’s 9th Division. Activists alleged that on 18 September an eleven-year boy was killed after being shot in the head by security forces during a boycott protest by students in as-Sanamayn on the first day of the 2011–2012 school year.

Local rebels were active in as-Sanamayn, and controlled large parts of the city, but never completely controlled the city as it was home to a number of military security centers, and the 9th division. Rebels would engage in small scale clashes or attack army positions with projectiles such as mortars. The city was besieged by the Syrian Army and shelling commenced. Rebels and civilians in the city entered negotiations that concluded with a reconciliation agreement in which the rebels were to hand over their weapons and pledge not to carry out attacks against the government. They, along with draft-dodgers were also ordered to join the regular forces and the Russian-led 5th corps. 500 people including 150 rebel fighters signed the agreement, and as-Sanamayn came under nominal government control.

Following the 2018 Southern Syria offensive, one of the terms of the reconciliation agreements was to allow civilians and rebel fighters to return to homes they were displaced from. Multiple civilians and former rebels returned to as-Sanamayn. Like other areas of Daraa governorate, as-Sanamayn became the frequent location of attacks against the Syrian Army and pro-government militias. Walid al-Zahra, a former commander and one of the rebels who returned to as-Sanamayn in 2018, led many of these attacks.

As-Sanamayn was stormed by the Syrian Army in the March 2020 Daraa clashes. Following this, the fighters either reconciled and settled their status or were evacuated to rebel-held northwest Syria.

Clashes broke out in the city in March 2025.

== Geography ==
=== Climate ===
As-Sanamayn has a cold semi-arid climate (Köppen climate classification: BSk). Rainfall is higher in winter than in summer. The average annual temperature in As-Sanamayn is 17.1 °C (62.8 °F). About 278 mm (10.94 in) of precipitation falls annually.

Climate data for As-Sanamayn
| Month | Jan | Feb | Mar | Apr | May | Jun | Jul | Aug | Sep | Oct | Nov | Dec | Year |
|---|---|---|---|---|---|---|---|---|---|---|---|---|---|
| Mean daily maximum °C (°F) | 12.2 (54.0) | 14.1 (57.4) | 17.8 (64.0) | 22.4 (72.3) | 28.3 (82.9) | 32.0 (89.6) | 33.2 (91.8) | 33.7 (92.7) | 31.3 (88.3) | 27.6 (81.7) | 20.8 (69.4) | 14.8 (58.6) | 24.0 (75.2) |
| Mean daily minimum °C (°F) | 2.6 (36.7) | 3.3 (37.9) | 5.9 (42.6) | 8.7 (47.7) | 12.7 (54.9) | 15.5 (59.9) | 17.3 (63.1) | 17.6 (63.7) | 15.2 (59.4) | 12.7 (54.9) | 7.9 (46.2) | 4.7 (40.5) | 10.3 (50.6) |
| Average precipitation mm (inches) | 68 (2.7) | 52 (2.0) | 39 (1.5) | 14 (0.6) | 7 (0.3) | 0 (0) | 0 (0) | 0 (0) | 0 (0) | 8 (0.3) | 30 (1.2) | 60 (2.4) | 278 (10.9) |
Source: Climate-Data.org, Climate data

== Religious buildings ==
- Bilal al-Habashi Mosque
- Abd Allah ibn Rawahah Mosque
- Al-Rahman Mosque
- Al-Sahaba Mosque
- Al-Rifa’i Mosque
- Ali ibn Abi Talib Mosque
- Al-Salihin Mosque
- Abu Bakr al-Siddiq Mosque
- Uthman ibn Affan Mosque
- Mu’adh ibn Jabal Mosque

== Bibliography ==
- Burns, Ross (2005). Damascus: A History. London: Routledge. ISBN 0-415-27105-3.
- Butcher, Kevin (2003). Roman Syria and the Near East. Getty Publications. ISBN 0892367156.
- Hütteroth, W.-D.; Abdulfattah, K. (1977). Historical Geography of Palestine, Transjordan and Southern Syria in the Late 16th Century. Erlanger Geographische Arbeiten, Sonderband 5. Erlangen, Germany: Vorstand der Fränkischen Geographischen Gesellschaft. ISBN 3-920405-41-2.
- Gibb, H.A.R. (2003). The Damascus Chronicle of the Crusades: Extracted and Translated from the Chronicle of Ibn Al-Qalanisi. Courier Dover Publications. ISBN 0486425193.
- Le Strange, G. (1890). Palestine Under the Moslems: A Description of Syria and the Holy Land from A.D. 650 to 1500. Committee of the Palestine Exploration Fund.
- Michie, Allan Andrew (1942). Retreat to Victory. Alliance Book Corporation. "Sanamain."
- Nelles Guide (1999). Syria and Lebanon. Hunter Publishing, Inc. ISBN 3886181057.
- Newbold, Captain (1846). "On the site of Ashtaroth". The Journal of the Royal Geographical Society. 16. Murray: 331–338. doi:10.2307/1798240. JSTOR 1798240.
- Peters, F.E. (1994). The Hajj: The Muslim Pilgrimage to Mecca and the Holy Places. Princeton University Press. ISBN 069102619X.
- Petersen, Andrew (2012). "8: The Hajj Route in Syria". The Medieval and Ottoman Hajj Route in Jordan: An Archaeological and Historical Study. Council for British Research in the Levant. ISBN 978-1842175026.
- Porter, J.L. (1858). A Handbook for Travellers in Syria and Palestine. Vol. 1. Murray.
- Sartre, M. (2005). The Middle East Under Rome. Harvard University Press. ISBN 0674016831.
- Shatzmiller, Maya (1993). Crusaders and Muslims in Twelfth-century Syria. BRILL. ISBN 9004097775.
