= As-Sanamayn District =

Coordinates: 33.1256°N 36.2754°E

As-Sanamayn District (Arabic: منطقة الصنمين) is a district (mantiqah) administratively belonging to Daraa Governorate, Syria. At the 2004 Census it had a population of 167,993. Its administrative centre is the city of As-Sanamayn.

== Sub-districts ==
The district of As-Sanamayn is divided into three sub-districts or Nāḥiyas (population according to 2004 official census):

- As-Sanamayn Subdistrict (ناحية الصنمين): population 113,316.
- Al-Masmiyah Subdistrict (ناحية المسمية) :population 8,773.
- Ghabaghib Subdistrict (ناحية غباغب): population 45,793.
