= Marana, Syria =

Marana مرانة
- Village
- Location in Syria
- Coordinates: 33°21′34″N 36°11′54″E
- Country: Syria
- Governorate: Rif Dimashq
- District: Markaz Rif Dimashq District
- Subdistrict: al-Kiswah

Population (2004)
  - Total: 1,176
- Time zone: UTC+2 (EET)
  - Summer (DST): UTC+3 (EEST)

Marana (Arabic: مرانة) is a Syrian village located in Markaz Rif Dimashq District, Rif Dimashq. According to the Syria Central Bureau of Statistics (CBS), Marana had a population of 1,176 in the 2004 census. To its north is Kawkab and the 100th division base, to its south is Muqaylibah and al-Taybah, to its east is al-Kiswah, and to its west is Deir Khabiyah and Zakiyah.
