= Khan Dannun =

Khan Dannun خان دنون Khan Danoun
- Village
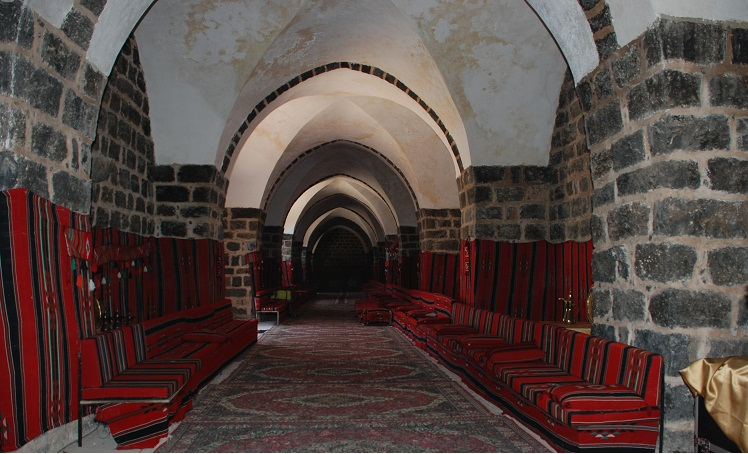

- Location within Syria
- Coordinates: 33°19′55″N 36°19′56″E
- Country: Syria
- Governorate: Rif Dimashq
- District: Markaz Rif Dimashq
- Subdistrict: al-Kiswah

Population (2004)
  - Total: 8,727
- Time zone: UTC+3 (EET)
  - Summer (DST): UTC+2 (EEST)

Khan Dannun (Arabic: خان دنون, also spelled Khan Danun, Khan Dunnun or Khan Dhul-Nun) is a town in southern Syria, administratively part of the Markaz Rif Dimashq District of the Rif Dimashq Governorate. Located south of Damascus, nearby localities include al-Taybah to the west, Muqaylibah to the northwest, al-Kiswah 5 kilometers to the north and Khiyarat Dannun to the east. According to the Syria Central Bureau of Statistics, Khan Dannun had a population of 8,727 in the 2004 census.

Khan Dannun also contains a refugee camp, the Khan Dannun camp, and is one of ten Palestinian refugee camps in Syria recognized by UNRWA. According to UNRWA statistics the camp had a population of 7,841 in 1998. According to UNRWA the population of the camp in June 2008 was 9,479 persons and 2,192 families.

== History ==
Khan Dannun was originally a large khan ("caravansary") completed in 1376 by the Mamluk governor of Damascus, Manjak al-Yusufi, during the reign of the Bahri Mamluk sultan al-Ashraf Sha'ban. The khan was designed by Ali ibn al-Badri, known as muhandis ash-Sham ("engineer of Damascus.") The name "Dan nun" is the colloquial version of "Dhul-Nun," a highly venerated 9th-century Muslim figure. He is considered to be the early patriarch of the Sufis. Khan Dannun became a stopping point on the hajj ("pilgrimage to Mecca") caravan route after al-Kiswah, and before Ghabaghib.

The khan, with exception of its vaults, was built in the traditional basalt masonry typically found in the old structures in Hauran. It consisted of an open, square-shaped courtyard, the center of which had been occupied by livestock. Surrounding the courtyard were arcades built atop lodging apartments which served as accommodation for visitors. The courtyard was flanked by circular basalt towers. Inside the khan was a small prayer room with mihrab niche which indicated the direction of Mecca. A marsh was formed in front of the khan's gate as a result of an eastern-flowing rivulet.

When traveler John Lewis Burckhardt visited the site in the early 19th-century, the khan was in ruins. Khan Dannun was one of the stops on the Damascus-Hauran line of the Hejaz Railway.

In 1949, following the 1948 Arab-Israeli War, a Palestinian refugee camp called Khan Dannun was set up in the town. In 2009 a new sewage project for Khan Dannun, funded by the European Commission, was finished.

== Bibliography ==
- Bosworth, Clifford Edmund (1989). Encyclopaedia of Islam, Fascicle 107, Parts 107-108. Brill Archive. ISBN 9004090827.
- Burckhardt, Johann Ludwig (1822). Travels in Syria and the Holy Land. J. Murray.
- Constable, Olivia Remia (2004). Housing the Stranger in the Mediterranean World: Lodging, Trade, and Travel in Late Antiquity and the Middle Ages. Cambridge University Press. ISBN 0521819180.
- Masterman, E. W. G. (1897). "The Damascus Railways". Quarterly Statement - Palestine Exploration Fund. 29 (3): 198–200. doi:10.1179/peq.1897.29.3.198.
- Meinecke, Michael (1996). Patterns of Stylistic Changes in Islamic Architecture: Local Traditions Versus Migrating Artists. New York University Press. ISBN 9780814754924.
- Museum With No Frontiers (2000). The Umayyads: The Rise of Islamic Art. AIRP. ISBN 187404435X.
- Newbold, Captain (1846). "On the site of Ashtaroth". The Journal of the Royal Geographical Society. 16. Murray: 331–338. doi:10.2307/1798240. JSTOR 1798240.
- Ibn Taghribirdi (1955). Popper, William (ed.). University of California publications in Semitic philology. Vol. 15–17. The University of California Press.
