= Muqaylibah =

Muqaylibah المقيليبة
- Village
- Location in Syria
- Coordinates: 33°21′9″N 36°12′13″E
- Country: Syria
- Governorate: Rif Dimashq
- District: Markaz Rif Dimashq District
- Subdistrict: al-Kiswah

Population (2004)
  - Total: 5,022
- Time zone: UTC+2 (EET)
  - Summer (DST): UTC+3 (EEST)

Al-Muqaylibah (Arabic: المقيليبة) is a Syrian village located in Markaz Rif Dimashq District, Rif Dimashq. According to the Syria Central Bureau of Statistics (CBS), Muqaylibah had a population of 5,022 in the 2004 census. To its north are Marana, Kawkab, and the 100th Regiment Base, to its east is al-Kiswah, to its south is Al-Taybah and to its west are Deir Khabiyah and Zakiyah.

== History ==
In 1838, Eli Smith noted Muqaylibah's population as being Sunni Muslims.

== Bibliography ==
- Robinson, E.; Smith, E. (1841). Biblical Researches in Palestine, Mount Sinai and Arabia Petraea: A Journal of Travels in the year 1838. Vol. 3. Boston: Crocker & Brewster.
