= Ayn al-Souda, Rif Dimashq Governorate =

Ayn al-Souda عين السودة
- Village
- Location in Syria
- Coordinates: 33°18′44″N 36°13′12″E
- Country: Syria
- Governorate: Rif Dimashq
- District: Markaz Rif Dimashq District
- Subdistrict: al-Kiswah

Population (2004)
  - Total: 809
- Time zone: UTC+2 (EET)
  - Summer (DST): UTC+3 (EEST)

Ayn al-Souda (Arabic: عين السودة) which means Black Spring, is a Syrian village located in Markaz Rif Dimashq District, Rif Dimashq. According to the Syria Central Bureau of Statistics (CBS), Ayn al-Souda had a population of 809 in the 2004 census. Nearby localities include Ayn al-Bayda and Khiyarat Dannun.
