= Ayn al-Bayda, Rif Dimashq =

Ayn al-Bayda عين البيضة
- Village
- Location in Syria
- Coordinates: 33°17′24″N 36°11′38″E
- Country: Syria
- Governorate: Rif Dimashq
- District: Markaz Rif Dimashq District
- Subdistrict: al-Kiswah

Population (2004)
  - Total: 1,252
- Time zone: UTC+2 (EET)
  - Summer (DST): UTC+3 (EEST)

Ayn al-Bayda (Arabic: عين البيضة) which means White Spring, is a Syrian village located in Markaz Rif Dimashq District, Rif Dimashq. According to the Syria Central Bureau of Statistics (CBS), Ayn al-Bayda had a population of 1,252 in the 2004 census. Nearby localities include Al-Taybah, Khiyarat Dannun and Zakiyah.
