= Ayn al-Bayda =

Ayn al-Bada may refer to:

- Ayn al-Bayda, Rif Dimashq, a village in Rif Dimashq Governorate of Syria
- Ayn al-Bayda, Latakia, a village in Latakia Governorate of Syria
- Ayn al-Bayda, Jarabulus, a village in Aleppo Governorate of Syria
- Ein al-Beida, a Palestinian village of in the Tubas Governorate in the northeastern West Bank
