= Khan Dannun camp =

Palestinian refugee camp in Syria

Khan Dannun camp is one of the Palestinian refugee camps and the camp is located near the ruins of Khan Dannun, which were built several centuries ago in order to provide a place for the commercial convoys that were running on the old trade route between Jerusalem and Istanbul.

In 1948, these ruins provided a haven for refugees from northern Palestine, especially from the villages of the Hula valley. The camp, which is located 23 kilometers south of Damascus, was officially established between 1950-1951 on a land area of 0.03 square kilometers.

A significant percentage of the population descends from the villages of Mallaha and Al-Salihiyya, as well as other villages in the district of Safad, including Al-Mufakharah, Darwara, Al-Khalisa, Al-Zuq Al-Tahtani, Al-Zuq Al-Fawqani, Al-Walid's tents, and Jahoula. In addition to the clan of Trama and Al-Salma from the Galilee.
