= Zureiqiya =

Zureiqiya الزريقية
- Village
- Location in Syria
- Coordinates: 33°13′58″N 36°11′44″E
- Country: Syria
- Governorate: Rif Dimashq
- District: Markaz Rif Dimashq District
- Subdistrict: al-Kiswah

Population (2004)
  - Total: 749
- Time zone: UTC+2 (EET)
  - Summer (DST): UTC+3 (EEST)

Zureiqiya (Arabic: الزريقية), is a Syrian village located in Markaz Rif Dimashq District, Rif Dimashq. According to the Syria Central Bureau of Statistics (CBS), Zuraiqiya had a population of 749 in the 2004 census. Nearby localities include Arkis, Ghabaghib, Kanakir, and Deir al-Bukht.
