= Zakiyah =

Zakiyah زاكية
- Town
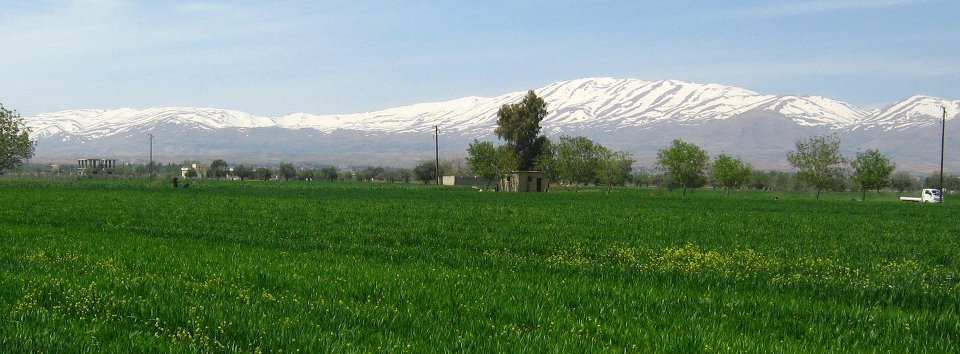
- Zakiyah with Mount Hermon in the background

- Location in Syria
- Coordinates: 33°20′4″N 36°9′24″E
- Country: Syria
- Governorate: Rif Dimashq
- District: Markaz Rif Dimashq
- Subdistrict: Al-Kiswah

Population (2004)
  - Total: 18,553
- Time zone: UTC+2 (EET)
  - Summer (DST): UTC+3 (EEST)
- City Qrya Pcode: C2279

Zakyah (Arabic: زاكية) is a Syrian town located in Markaz Rif Dimashq, Rif Dimashq. According to the Syria Central Bureau of Statistics (CBS), Zakiyah had a population of 18,553 in the 2004 census.

== History ==
In 1838, Eli Smith noted Zakyah's population being Sunni Muslims.

== Bibliography ==
- Robinson, E.; Smith, E. (1841). Biblical Researches in Palestine, Mount Sinai and Arabia Petraea: A Journal of Travels in the year 1838. Vol. 3. Boston: Crocker & Brewster.
