= Deir Khabiyah =

Deir Khabiyah دير خبية
- Village
- Location in Syria
- Coordinates: 33°22′1″N 36°9′36″E
- Country: Syria
- Governorate: Rif Dimashq
- District: Markaz Rif Dimashq
- Subdistrict: Al-Kiswah

Population (2004)
  - Total: 4,350
- Time zone: UTC+2 (EET)
  - Summer (DST): UTC+3 (EEST)
- City Qrya Pcode: C2287

Deir Khabiyah (Arabic: دير خبية) is a Syrian village located in Markaz Rif Dimashq, Rif Dimashq. According to the Syria Central Bureau of Statistics (CBS), Deir Khabiyah had a population of 4,350 in the 2004 census.

== History ==
The tell in Deir Khabiyah dates back to the Bronze Age and Iron Age from the beginning of the 2nd to the 1st millennium BC.

In 1838, Eli Smith noted Deir Khabiyah's population being Sunni Muslims.

== Syrian Civil War ==
On 26 May 2016, Deir Khabiyah was captured by Ahrar al-Sham, in conjunction with several other Syrian rebel groups.

On 16 May 2022, two fighters of the Pro-Assad Ba'ath militia were killed in a double IED explosion in the village.

== Bibliography ==
- Robinson, E.; Smith, E. (1841). Biblical Researches in Palestine, Mount Sinai and Arabia Petraea: A Journal of Travels in the year 1838. Vol. 3. Boston: Crocker & Brewster.
