= Khiyarat Dannun =

Khiyarat Dannun خيارة دنون Khiarah
- Village
- Location within Syria
- Coordinates: 33°19′31″N 36°14′36″E
- Country: Syria
- Governorate: Rif Dimashq Governorate
- District: Markaz Rif Dimashq
- Subdistrict: Kafr Batna

Population (2004)
  - Total: 3,645
- Time zone: UTC+3 (EET)
  - Summer (DST): UTC+2 (EEST)

Khiyarat Dannun (Arabic: خيارة دنون, also spelled Khiara) is a village in the Rif Dimashq Governorate in southern Syria south of Damascus. Nearby localities include Khan Dannun to the west, al-Kiswah to the north and Deir Ali to the southeast. Khiyarat Dannun had a population of 3,645 in 2004.

== History ==
In 1838, Eli Smith noted el-Khiyarah as being populated by Sunni Muslims.
