= Al-Taybah, Rif Dimashq Governorate =

Al-Taybah الطيبة
- Village
- Location in Syria
- Coordinates: 33°20′1″N 36°12′15″E
- Country: Syria
- Governorate: Rif Dimashq
- District: Markaz Rif Dimashq
- Subdistrict: Al-Kiswah

Population (2004)
  - Total: 4,008
- Time zone: UTC+2 (EET)
  - Summer (DST): UTC+3 (EEST)
- City Qrya Pcode: C2281

Al-Taybah (Arabic: الطيبة) is a Syrian village located in Markaz Rif Dimashq, Rif Dimashq. According to the Syria Central Bureau of Statistics (CBS), Al-Taybah had a population of 4,008 in the 2004 census. In 1838, Eli Smith noted Al-Taybah's population as being Sunni Muslims.

== Bibliography ==
- Robinson, E.; Smith, E. (1841). Biblical Researches in Palestine, Mount Sinai and Arabia Petraea: A Journal of Travels in the year 1838. Vol. 3. Boston: Crocker & Brewster.
