= S-300 missile system =

Series of Soviet surface-to-air missile systems

S-300 family NATO reporting name: SA-10 Grumble, SA-12 Giant/Gladiator, SA-20 Gargoyle, SA-N-6 Grumble, SA-N-20 Gargoyle
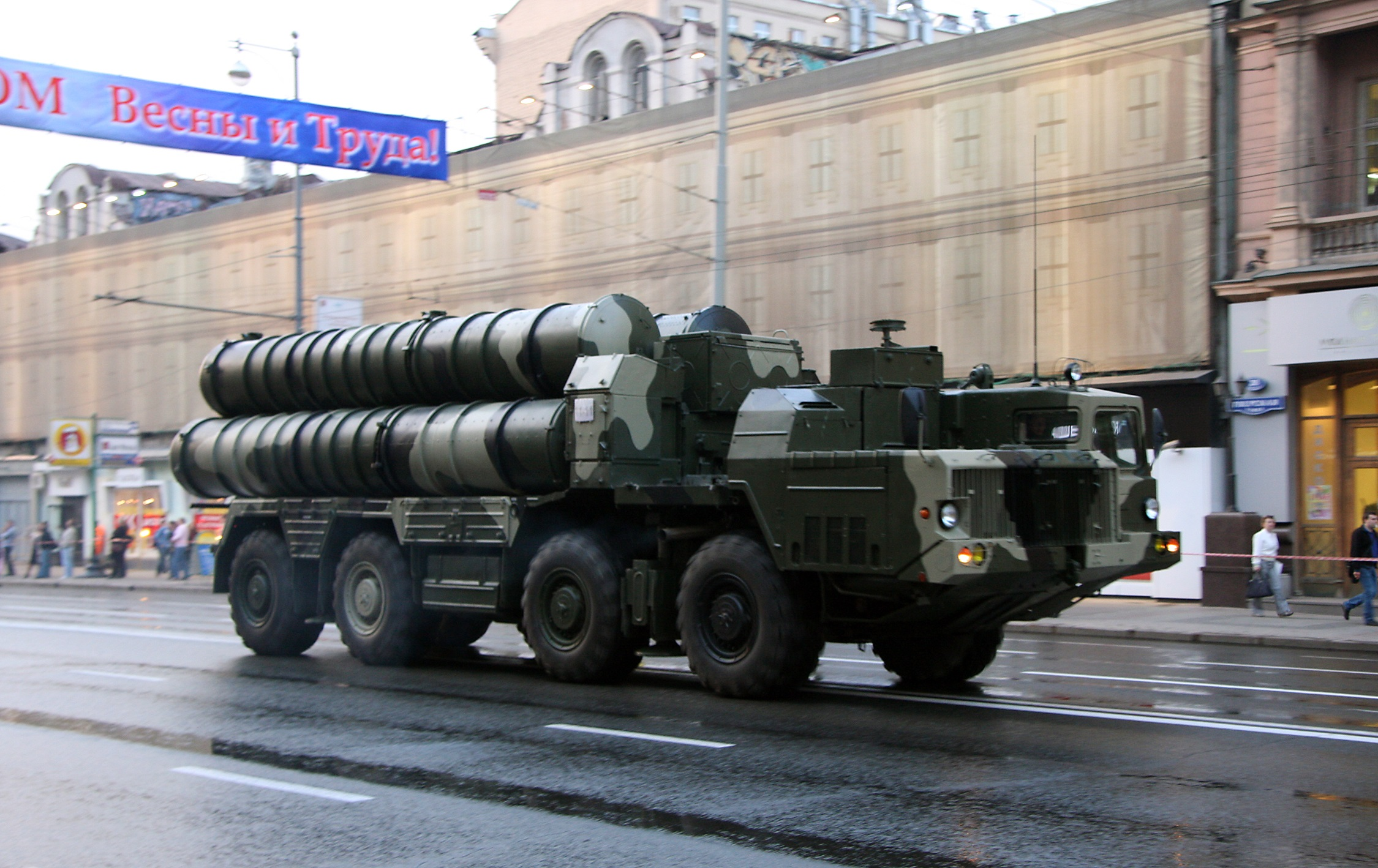
- TEL component of an S-300 air defense system at the 2009 Moscow Victory Day Parade rehearsal, Red Square, 28 April 2009
- Type: Long-range surface-to-air and anti-ballistic missile system
- Place of origin: Soviet Union

Service history
- In service: 1978–present
- Used by: See list of operators
- Wars: Syrian Civil War; Second Nagorno-Karabakh War; Russo-Ukrainian war

Production history
- Designer: Almaz-Antey: NPO Almaz (lead designer) NIIP (radars) MKB Fakel (missile designer for S-300P series) NPO Novator (missile designer for S-300V series) MNIIRE Altair (Naval version designer)
- Designed: 1967–2005
- Manufacturer: MZiK
- Unit cost: Export cost: US$120–150 million (FY 2010) for a battery
- Produced: 1975–2011 (for PS and PM)
- Variants: see variants

The S-300 (NATO reporting name SA-10 Grumble) is a series of long-range surface-to-air missile systems developed by the former Soviet Union. It was produced by NPO Almaz for the Soviet Air Defence Forces to defend against air raids and cruise missiles.

It is used by Russia, Ukraine, and other former Eastern Bloc countries, along with Bulgaria and Greece. It is also used by China, Iran, and other countries in Asia.

The system is fully automated, though manual observation and operation are also possible. Each targeting radar provides target designation for the central command post. The command post compares the data received from the targeting radars and filters out false targets. The central command post has both active and passive target detection modes. Missiles have a maximum range of 40 kilometres (25 mi) from the command post.

The successor to the S-300 is the S-400 (NATO reporting name SA-21 Growler), which entered service on 28 April 2007.

== Variations and upgrades ==
There are currently three main variations of the S-300, named S-300V, S-300P, S-300F. The production of the S-300 started in 1975, with the tests for the S-300P variant being completed in 1978. The tests for the S-300V variant were conducted in 1983, and its anti-ballistic capabilities were tested in 1987. Numerous versions have since emerged with different missiles, improved radars, better resistance to countermeasures, longer range, and better capability at targeting aircraft flying at very low altitude as well as incoming munitions, such as anti-radiation missiles or glide bombs.

=== S-300 system family tree ===
S-300 Family
S-300V	S-300P	S-300F
S-300V1	S-300V2	S-300PT	S-300PS	Fort	Rif
S-300VM	S-300PT-1	S-300PM	S-300PMU	Fort-M	Rif-M
Favorit-S
S-300VM1	S-300VM2	S-300PT-1A	S-300PM1	S-300PMU1
Antey 2500	S-300PM2	S-300PMU2	Domestic Version
S-300V4	Favorit	Export Version
S-300VMD	S-400

=== S-300P (SA-10) ===
The total production for the S-300P systems was 3,000 launchers and 28,000 missiles through 2012.

==== S-300P/S-300PT ====
The S-300P/S-300PT (Russian: С-300П/С-300ПТ, NATO reporting name SA-10A Grumble A) is the original version of the S-300. The P suffix stands for PVO-Strany (Russian: противовоздушная оборона–страны, or country air defence). In 1987, over 80 of these systems were active, mainly around Moscow. An S-300PT unit consists of a 36D6 (NATO reporting name Tin Shield) surveillance radar, a 30N6 (FLAP LID) fire control system, and 5P85-1 launch vehicles. The 5P85-1 vehicles are semi-trailer trucks. A 76N6 (CLAM SHELL) low-altitude detection radar is usually also a part of the unit.

The S-300PT had a passive electronically scanned array radar and had the ability to engage multiple targets with a single fire-control system. Since the original system was semi-mobile, it took just over one hour to set up for firing. It ran the risk of the missile hot launch system scorching the transporter erector launcher (TEL).

It was originally intended to use a track-via-missile (TVM) guidance system. However, the TVM system had problems tracking targets below 500 metres (1,600 ft), allowing incoming SEAD aircraft to effectively utilize terrain masking to avoid tracking. To improve tracking of low-altitude targets, a command-guidance system was added to guide the missile for the initial part of the flight. This allowed the minimum engagement altitude to be set to 25 metres (82 ft).

Improvements to the S-300P resulted in several sub-versions for both domestic and international markets. The S-300PT-1 and S-300PT-1A are incremental upgrades of the original S-300PT system, using a new 5V55KD missile and a cold launch method. The time it took to set the system up was reduced to 30 minutes and trajectory optimizations allowed the 5V55KD to reach ranges up to 75 kilometres (47 mi).

==== S-300PS/S-300PM ====
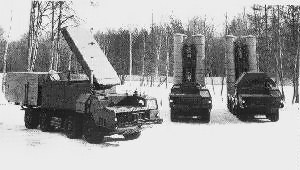
Two S-300PM missile TEL and a 'Flap Lid' radar

The S-300PS/S-300PM (Russian С-300ПC/С-300ПМ, NATO reporting name SA-10B Grumble B) was introduced in 1985 (according to Russia) and is the only version thought to have been fitted with a nuclear warhead. This model saw the introduction of the modern TEL and mobile radar and command-post vehicles that were all based on the MAZ-7910 8×8 truck. This model also featured new 5V55R missiles, which increased the maximum engagement range to 75 km (47 mi) and introduced a terminal semi-active radar homing (SARH) guidance mode. The surveillance radar of these systems was designated 30N6. Also introduced with this version was the distinction between self-propelled and towed TELs. The towed TEL is designated 5P85T. Mobile TELs were the 5P85S and 5P85D. The 5P85D was a "slave" TEL, being controlled by a 5P85S "master" TEL. The "master" TEL is identifiable thanks to the large equipment container behind the cabin; in the "slave" TEL this area is not enclosed and is used for cable or spare tyre storage.

==== S-300PMU ====
Development of a modernized variant for export, called the S-300PMU (Russian: С-300ПМУ, NATO reporting name SA-10C Grumble C), was completed in 1985. The PMU variant was fielded with the 5V55K (range 45–47 kilometres (28–29 mi)) and 5V55R (range 75–90 kilometres (47–56 mi)) missiles. Radars used for the S-300PMU complex included the 30N6 (NATO: "Flap Lid") target engagement radar, the 76N6 (NATO: "Clam Shell") low altitude detection radar, and the ST-68U (NATO: "Tin Shield") 3D search radar. In addition, the 64N6 (NATO: "Big Bird") radar was used as a search radar at the regimental command post (an S-300PMU regiment typically consisted of three missile batteries). The S-300PMU could engage targets with a radar cross section of at least 0.2 square metres (2.2 sq ft) and a maximum velocity of 1,300 metres per second (4,300 ft/s) at altitudes between 25 metres (82 ft) and 27,000 metres (89,000 ft). It could also engage surface targets at ranges up to 30 kilometres (19 mi).

==== S-300PMU-1/2 (SA-20A/B) ====
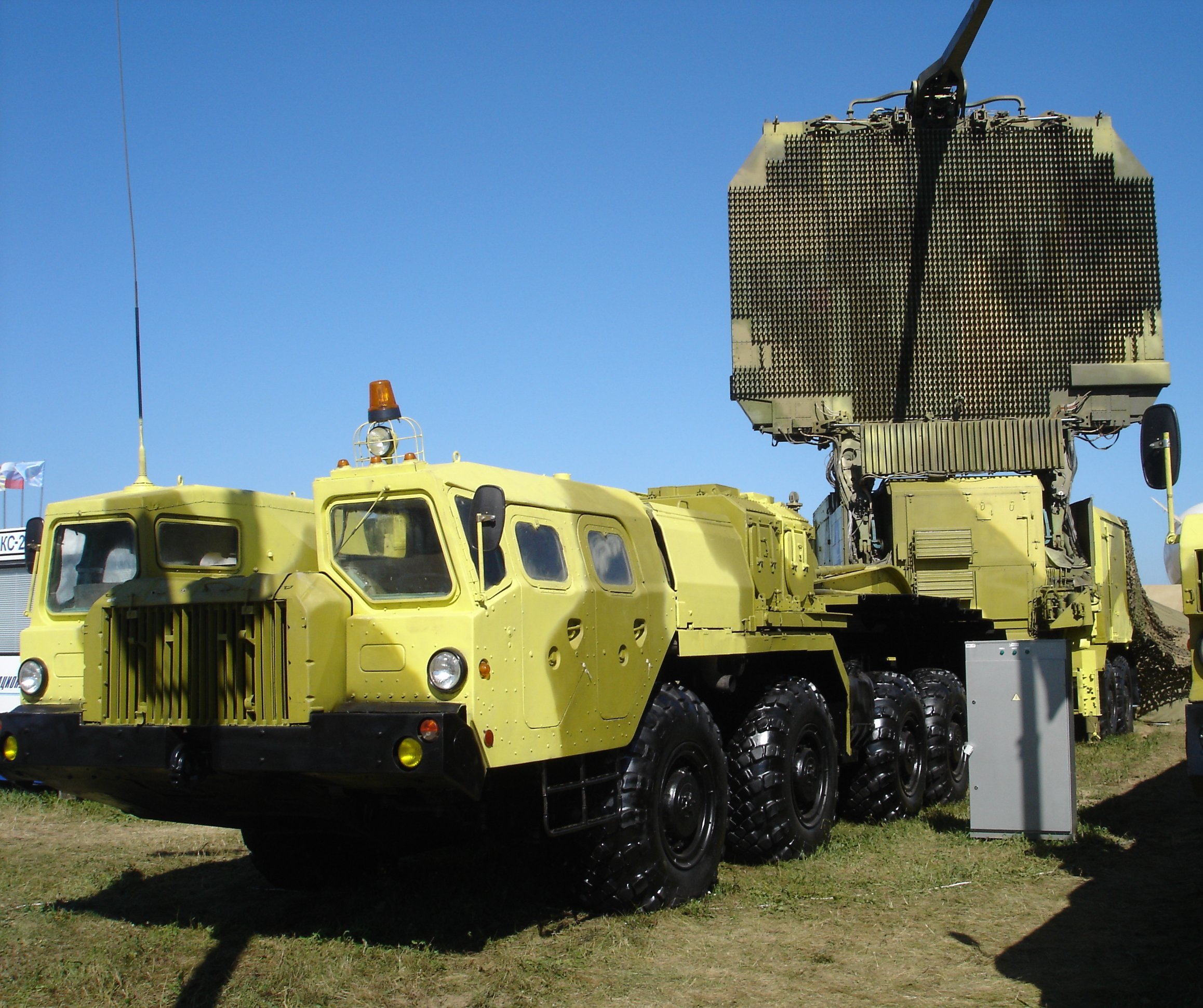
S-300PMU-2 64N6E2 acquisition radar (part of 83M6E2 command post)

The S-300PMU-1 (Russian: С-300ПМУ-1, NATO reporting name SA-20A Gargoyle) was also introduced in 1993, with the new and larger 48N6 missiles for the first time in a land-based system, and keeping all the same performance improvements from the S-300PM version, including the increased speed, range, SAGG guidance, and ABM capability. The warhead is slightly smaller than the naval version at 143 kg (315 lb). This version also saw the introduction of the new and more capable 30N6E TOMB STONE radar.

The S-300PMU-1 was introduced in 1993, using different missile types in a single system for the first time. In addition to the 5V55R and 48N6E missiles, the S-300PMU-1 can utilise two new missiles, the 9M96E1 and 9M96E2. Both are significantly smaller than the previous missiles, at 330 and 420 kg (730 and 930 lb), respectively, and carry a smaller 24 kg (53 lb) warhead. The 9M96E1 has an engagement range of 1–40 km (0.62–25 mi), and the 9M96E2 of 1–120 km (0.62–75 mi). They are still carried 4 per TEL. Rather than just relying on aerodynamic fins for manoeuvring, they use a gas-dynamic system which allows them to have an excellent probability of kill (P_{k}) despite the much smaller warhead. The P_{k} is estimated at 0.7 against a tactical ballistic missile, for either missile. The S-300PMU-1 typically uses the 83M6E command-and-control system, although it is also compatible with the older Baikal-1E and Senezh-M1E CCS command-and-control systems. The 83M6E system incorporates the 64N6E (BIG BIRD) surveillance/detection radar. The fire control/illumination and guidance radar used is the 30N6E(1), optionally matched with a 76N6 low-altitude detection radar and a 96L6E all-altitude detection radar. The 83M6E command-and-control system can control up to 12 TELs, both the self-propelled 5P85SE vehicle and the 5P85TE towed launchers. Generally, support vehicles are also included, such as the 40V6M tow vehicle, intended for lifting of the antenna post.

China developed its own version of the S-300PMU-1, called HQ-15. Previously, the missile was referred to in a Western think tank as the HQ-10, causing confusion with the unrelated HQ-10 short-range point-defense missile system.

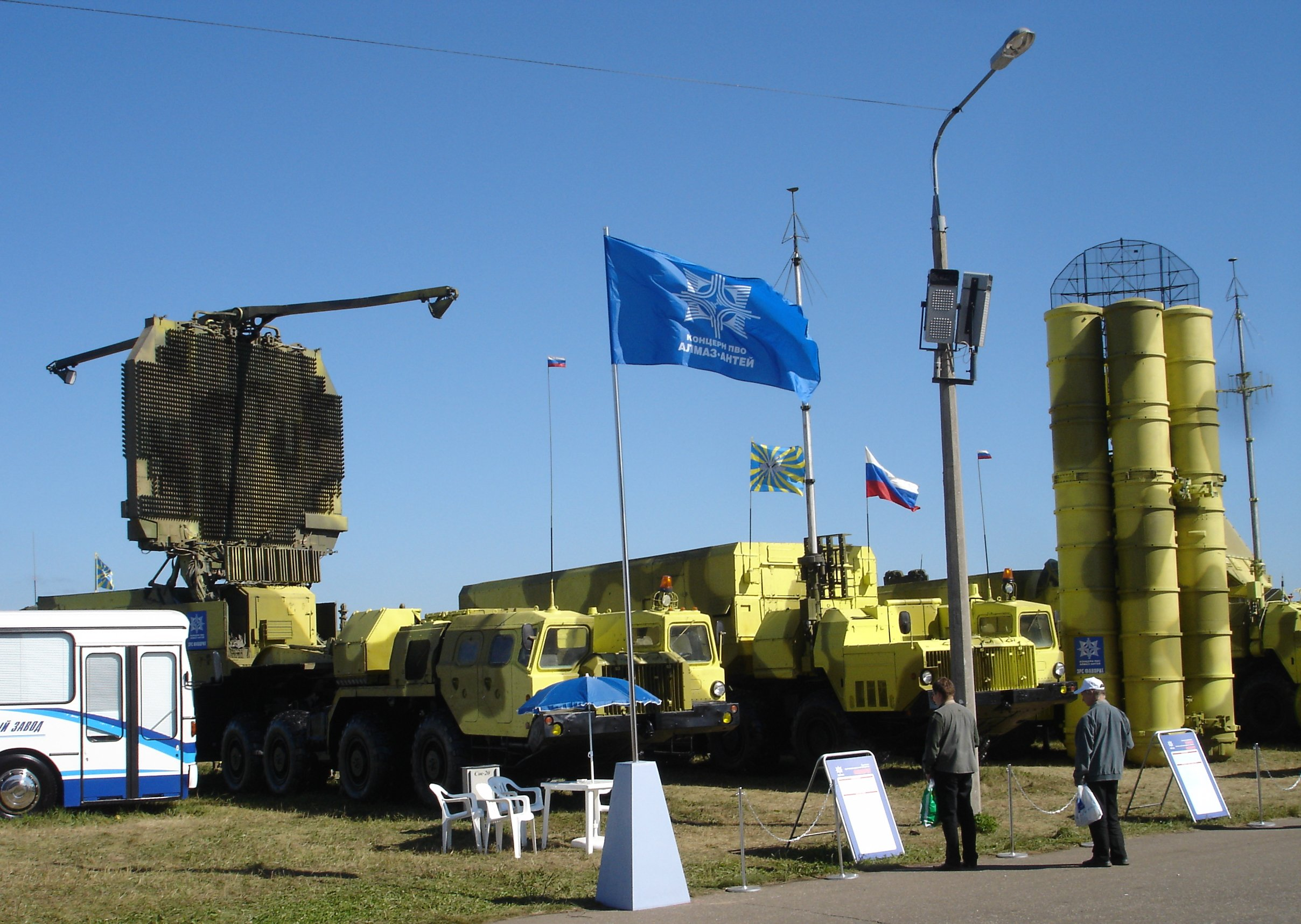
S-300PMU-2 vehicles. From left to right: 64N6E2 detection radar, 54K6E2 command post and 5P85 TEL.

The S-300PMU-2 Favorit (Russian: С-300ПМУ-2 Фаворит, NATO reporting name SA-20B Gargoyle), introduced in 1997 (presented ready 1996), is an upgrade to the S-300PMU-1 with a range of 195 km (121 mi) with the introduction of the 48N6E2 missile. This system is apparently capable against not just short-range ballistic missiles, but also medium-range ballistic missiles. It uses the 83M6E2 command and control system, consisting of the 54K6E2 command post vehicle and the 64N6E2 surveillance/detection radar. It employs the 30N6E2 fire control/illumination and guidance radar. Like the S-300PMU-1, 12 TELs can be controlled, with any mix of 5P85SE2 self-propelled and 5P85TE2 trailer launchers. Optionally it can make use of the 96L6E all-altitude detection radar and 76N6 low-altitude detection radar.

=== S-300F ===
==== Sea-based S-300F (SA-N-6) ====
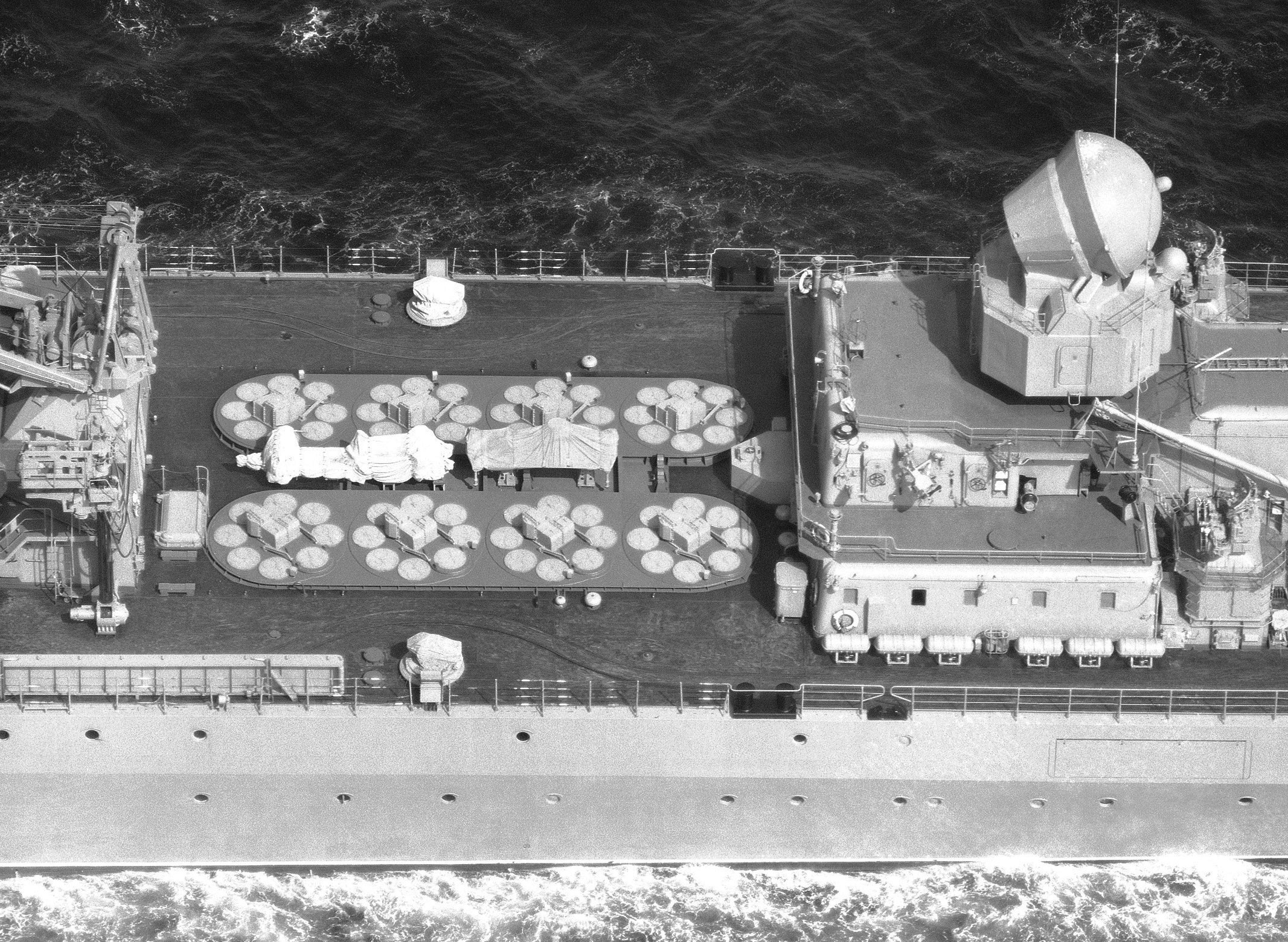
Close up view of SA-N-6 launchers on Marshal Ustinov

The S-300F Fort (Russian: С-300Ф, DoD designation SA-N-6, F suffix for Russian: Флотская or Naval) was introduced in 1984 as the original ship-based (naval) version of the S-300P system developed by Altair, with the new 5V55RM missile with range extended to 7–90 km (4.3–56 mi; 3.8–49 nmi) and maximum target speed up to Mach 4, while the engagement altitude was reduced to 25–25,000 m (82–82,021 ft). The naval version utilises the TOP SAIL or TOP STEER, TOP PAIR, and 3R41 Volna (TOP DOME) radar, and utilises command guidance with a terminal SARH mode. Its first installation and sea trials were on a Kara-class cruiser and it is also installed on Slava-class cruisers and Kirov-class battlecruisers. It is stored in eight (Slava) or twelve (Kirov) 8-missile rotary launchers below decks. The export version of this system is known as Rif (Russian: Риф or reef). The NATO name, found also in colloquial use, is Grumble.

==== Sea-based S-300FM (SA-N-20) ====
The S-300FM Fort-M (Russian: С-300ФМ, DoD designation SA-N-20) is another naval version of the system, installed only on the Kirov-class cruiser Pyotr Velikiy, and introducing the new 48N6 missile. It was introduced in 1990 and has a missile speed of approximately Mach 6 for a maximum target engagement speed of up to Mach 8.5, a warhead size of 150 kg (330 lb), an engagement range of 5–150 km (3.1–93 mi), and an altitude envelope of 10–27 km (6.2–16.8 mi). The new missiles also introduced a track-via-missile guidance method and the ability to intercept short-range ballistic missiles. This system makes use of the TOMB STONE MOD rather than TOP DOME radar. The export version is called the Rif-M. Two Rif-M systems were purchased by China in 2002 and installed on the Type 051C air-defence guided-missile destroyers.

=== S-300V (SA-12) ===
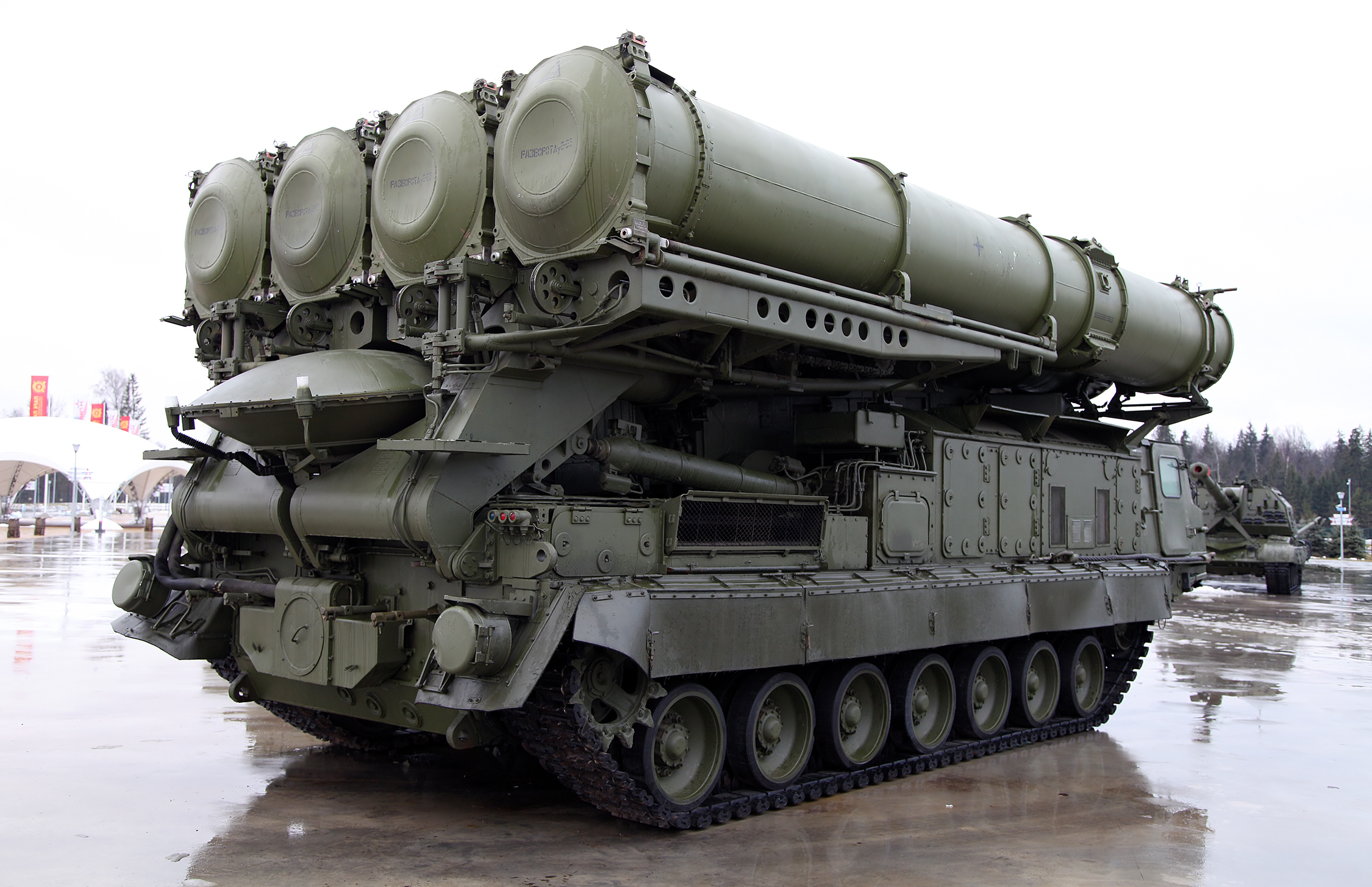
S-300V (SA-12A Gladiator)

The S-300V, starting with the 9M83 missile, entered service in 1983, and it was fully integrated in 1988.

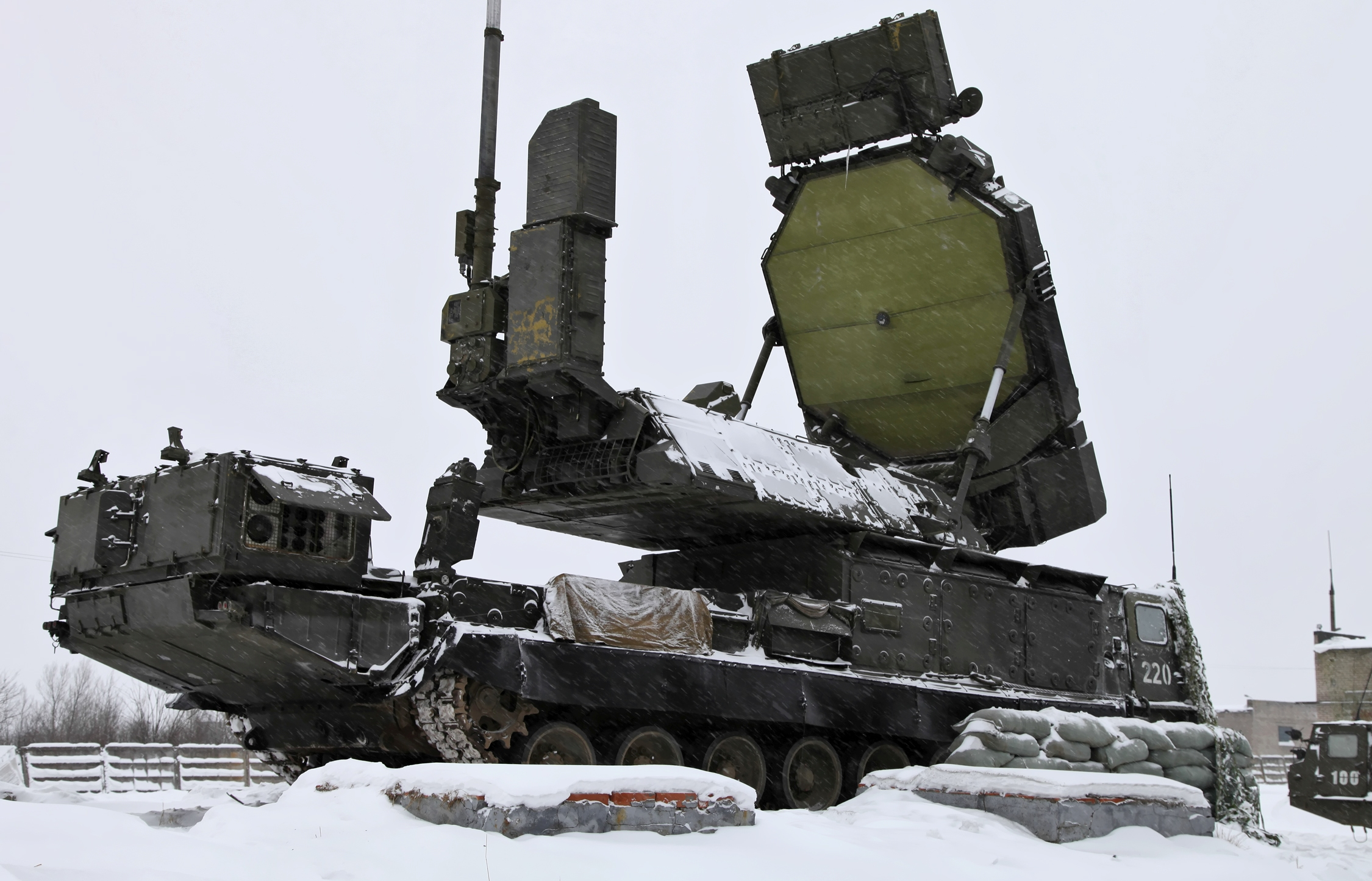
9S32 engagement radar

The 9K81 S-300V Antey-300 (Russian: 9К81 С-300В Антей-300 – named after Antaeus, NATO reporting name SA-12 Gladiator/Giant) varies from the other designs in the series. It was built by Antey rather than Almaz, and its 9M82 and 9M83 missiles were designed by NPO Novator. The V suffix stands for Voyska (ground forces). It was designed to be the top-tier army air defence system, replacing the 2K11 Krug, providing a defence against ballistic missiles, cruise missiles, and aircraft. The 9M83 (SA-12A Gladiator) missiles have a maximum engagement range of around 75 km (47 mi), while the 9M82 (SA-12B Giant) missiles can engage targets out to 100 km (62 mi) and up to altitudes of around 32 km (20 mi). In both cases the warhead is around 150 kg (330 lb).

While it was created from the same project, hence sharing the common S-300 designation with the S-300P air defense family, the S-300V had different priorities that resulted in a different design. The S-300V system is carried on tracked MT-T transporters, which gives it better cross-country mobility than the S-300Ps moving on 8×8 wheeled transporters. Its search, tracking, and command systems are more distributed than the S-300P's. For example, while both have mechanically scanning radar for target acquisition (9S15 BILL BOARD A), the battery level 9S32 GRILL PAN has an autonomous search ability and SARH delegated to illumination radar on transporter erector launcher and radar (TELAR) vehicles. The early 30N6 FLAP LID on the S-300P handles tracking and illumination, but is not equipped with an autonomous search capability (later upgraded). 9S15 can simultaneously carry out active (3 coordinates) and passive (2 positions) searches for targets.

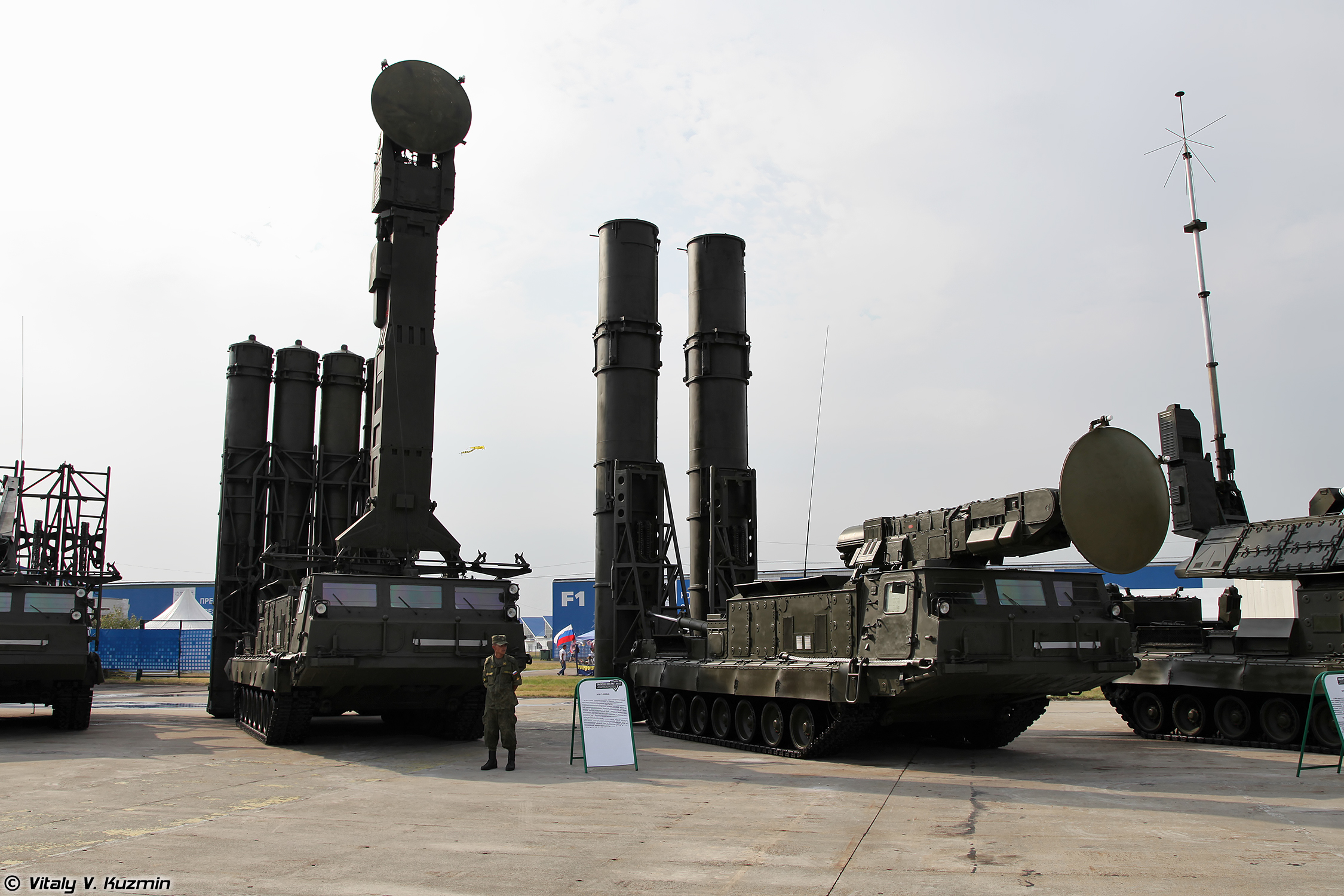
S-300V high altitude surface-to-air missile systems. Center-left 9А83, center-right 9А82 TELARs

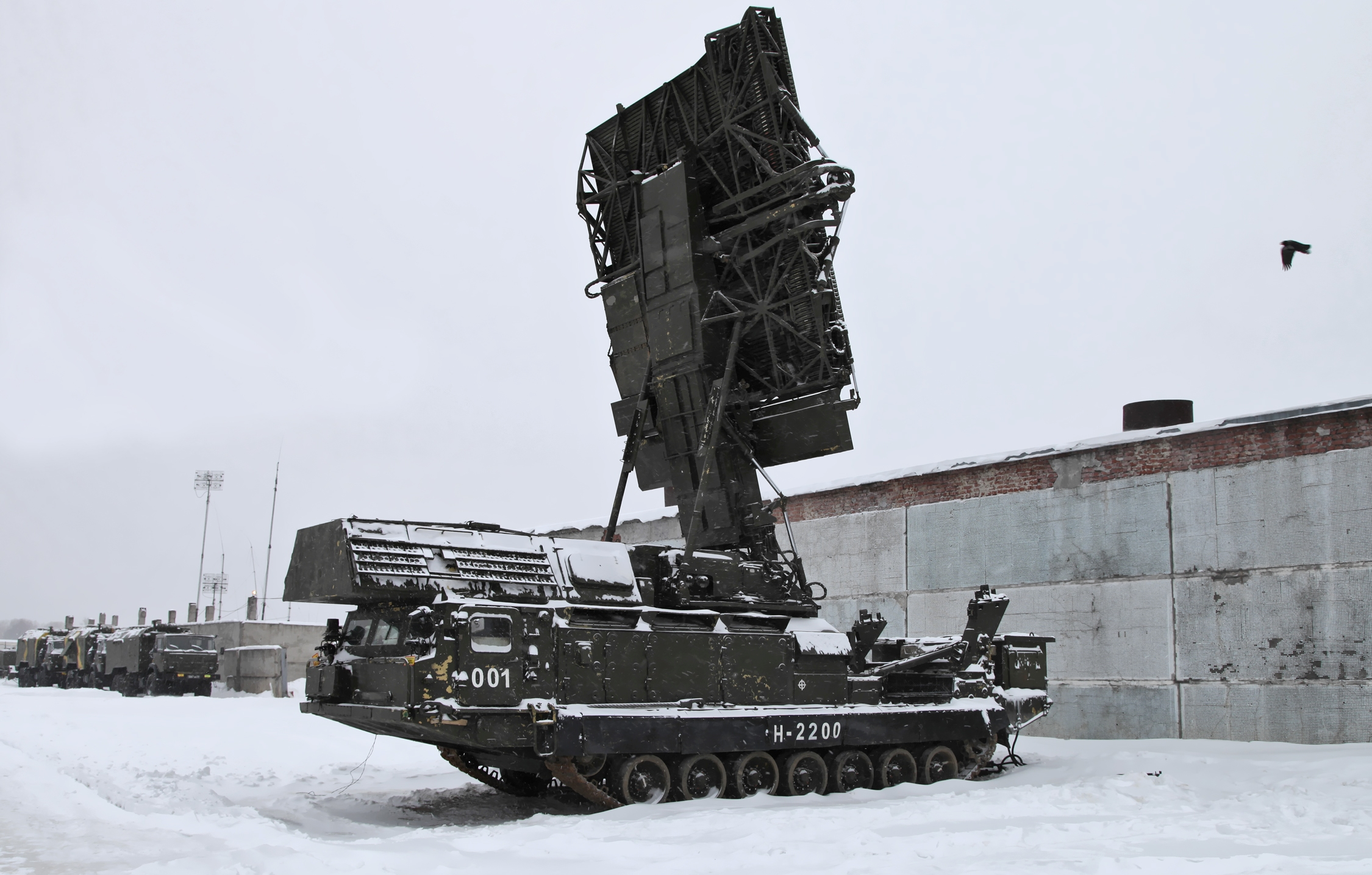
9S15M Obzor-3 acquisition radar

The S-300V places a greater emphasis on the anti-ballistic missile (ABM) mission, with a dedicated 9M82 (SA-12B Giant) anti-ballistic missile. This missile is larger and only two can be on each TELAR. It also has a dedicated ABM radar: the 9S19 HIGH SCREEN phased-array radar at battalion level. A typical S-300V battalion consists of a target-detection-and-designation unit, a guidance radar, and up to 6 TELARs. The detection-and-designation unit consists of the 9S457-1 command post, a 9S15MV or 9S15MT BILL BOARD all-round surveillance radar, and a 9S19M2 HIGH SCREEN sector surveillance radar. The S-300V uses the 9S32-1 GRILL PAN multi-channel guidance radar. Four types of missile-launcher vehicles can be used with the system:

- Transporter erector launcher and radar (TELAR) vehicles, which not only transport the missiles, but also fire and guide them (including radar illumination and targeting.) There are two models: the 9A83-1 TELAR holding four 9M83 Gladiator missiles and the 9A82 TELAR holding two 9M82 Giant missiles.
- Launcher/loader vehicles (LLV), which transport the missiles and can reload the TELARs, and also fire missiles under the control of a TELAR. There are two models: the 9A84 LLV holding two 9M83 Gladiator missiles and the 9A85 LLV holding two 9M82 Giant missiles.

The target detection ranges for each radar vary based on the radar cross-section of the target:

- 9S15M – 330 kilometres (210 mi) with a 10-square-metre (110 sq ft) cross section and 240 kilometres (150 mi) with a 3-square-metre (32 sq ft) cross section.
- 9S19M2 – 175 kilometres (109 mi) with an unknown cross-section; it contains two passive electronically scanned arrays with a very high resistance to interference.
- 9S32M (TELAR 9A82/9A83) – range is limited to 200 kilometres (120 mi), can work independently, or receive target designation from the S-300V, or a variety of other target designation data systems (AWACS aircraft and various ground-based radar). Targets with a radar cross-section of 0.1-square-metre (1.1 sq ft) are detected at ranges up to 140 kilometres (87 mi) and are locked on at 120 kilometres (75 mi). The 9S32 detection range against MGM-52 Lance missiles is 60 kilometres (37 mi), aircraft missiles 80 kilometres (50 mi), fighter or ballistic missile (MGM-31 Pershing) 140 kilometres (87 mi) (all of which the U.S. removed from service in 1991).
- The ability to hit a target with a cross section of 0.05 square metres (0.54 sq ft) at a distance of 30 kilometres (19 mi) (aiming system in the rocket (10/3 seconds before the missiles hit the target)). In addition, the guidance system inside the rocket supplements missile guidance systems commands from the 9A82 / 9A83 and 9S32, and the missile guidance systems to passively work with the radar illumination and radiation of the 9A82 / 9A83.

A S-300V system may be controlled by the upper level command post system 9S52 Polyana-D4 integrating it with the Buk missile system into a brigade.

China has built its own version of the S-300V called HQ-18.

=== S-300VM (SA-23) ===
The S-300VM (Antey 2500) is an upgrade of the S-300V. It consists of a new command-post vehicle, the 9S457ME, and a selection of new radars. These consist of the 9S15M2, 9S15MT2E, and 9S15MV2E all-round surveillance radars, and the 9S19ME sector surveillance radar. The upgraded guidance radar has the GRAU index of 9S32ME. The system can still employ up to six TELARs, the 9A84ME launchers (up to 4 9M83ME missiles), and up to 6 launcher/loader vehicles assigned to each launcher (2 9M83ME missiles each). An upgraded version, dubbed S-300V4, will be delivered to the Russian army in 2011.

The Antey-2500 complex is the export version developed separately from the S-300 family and has been exported to Venezuela for an estimated export price of US$1 billion. The system has one type of missile in two versions, basic and amended, with a sustainer stage that doubles the range (up to 200 km (120 mi), according to other data, up to 250 km (160 mi)), and can simultaneously engage up to 24 aircraft or 16 ballistic targets in various combinations.

It became the first system in the world capable of simultaneously engaging cruise missiles, aircraft, and ballistic targets. It also contains a private-sector radar for countering targets when affected by interference.

=== S-300V4 ===
The S-300V4 is also called S-300VMD. It was developed to target high-value airborne targets, such as AWACS aircraft, at long distances. Different versions of the NPO Novator 9M82MD S-300V4 missiles have a range of 400 kilometres (250 mi) at Mach 7.5 or a range of 350 kilometres (220 mi) at Mach 9, and can destroy maneuvering targets even at very high altitudes. An export version exists, marketed as the Antey-4000.

=== S-400 (SA-21) ===
The S-400 Triumf (Russian: С-400 «Триумф», formerly known as the S-300PMU-3/С-300ПМУ-3, NATO reporting name SA-21 Growler) was introduced in 1999 and featured a new, larger missile and several upgrades and new features. The project encountered delays since its original announcement, and deployment only began on a small scale in 2006. With an engagement range of up to 400 km (250 mi), depending on the missile variant used, it was specifically designed to counter stealth aircraft. It is by far the most advanced version, incorporating the ability to survive PGM threats and counter advanced jammers by using automatic frequency hopping.

== Specifications ==
S-300 variants will work together in various combinations, although interoperability between different variants is limited. Various higher-level mobile commands can coordinate certain variants at various locations into a single battery, and also integrate that battery with other air defence systems. A management system, consisting of command control and radars allows for fully automatic initiation and effective management of up to one hundred targets located up to 30–40 kilometres (19–25 mi) from the base station. Many tasks – detection, tracking, target setting, target designation, target acquisition, missile guidance, and assessment of results – can be dealt with automatically. The operator controls the target detection and the launch of rockets. In a complex environment, manual intervention is possible. Few of the previous systems possessed such capabilities.

The S-300 is a multi-channel anti-aircraft missile system whose variants can engage ballistic missiles as well as aircraft and are able to allocate up to 12 missiles to up to 6 different targets. The system can destroy ground targets at a range of 120 kilometres (75 mi), and when launched on a ballistic trajectory, can reach up to 400 kilometres (250 mi). Its vertically-launched missiles allow for the engagement of flying targets in any direction without traversing the launcher.

Early versions are guided by the 30N6 FLAP LID or naval 3R41 Volna (TOP DOME) radar using command guidance with terminal semi-active radar homing. Later versions use the 30N6 FLAP LID B or TOMB STONE radar to guide the missiles via command guidance/seeker-aided ground guidance (SAGG), similar to the U.S.-made Patriot's TVM guidance scheme. The earlier 30N6 FLAP LID A can guide up to four missiles at a time to up to four targets, and can track up to 24 targets at once. The 30N6E FLAP LID B can guide up to two missiles per target to up to six targets simultaneously. Early models can successfully engage targets flying at up to Mach 2.5, or around Mach 8.5 for later models, with one missile potentially being launched every three seconds. The mobile control centre is able to manage up to 12 TELs simultaneously.

The original warhead weighed 100 kg (220 lb), intermediate warheads weighed 133 kg (293 lb), and the latest warhead weighs 143 kg (315 lb). Each warhead is equipped with a proximity fuse and a contact fuse. A warhead will expel from 19,000 to 36,000 metal fragments upon detonation, depending on missile type. The missiles themselves weigh between 1,450 and 1,800 kg (3,200 and 3,970 lb). Missiles are catapulted clear of the launching tubes before their rocket motors fire, and can accelerate at up to 100 g (1 km/s^{2}). They launch straight upwards and then tip over towards their target, removing the need to aim the missiles before launch. The missiles are steered with a combination of control fins and thrust vectoring vanes. The sections below give exact specifications of the radar and missiles in the different S-300 versions. Since the S-300PM, most vehicles are interchangeable across variations.

=== Radar ===
The 30N6 FLAP LID A is mounted on a small trailer. The 64N6 BIG BIRD is mounted on a large trailer along with a generator and is typically towed with an 8-wheeled truck. The 76N6 CLAM SHELL (5N66M etc.) is mounted on a large trailer with a mast that is between 24 and 39 m (79 and 128 ft) tall. It is usually used with a mast. With the mast, it has a target detection range of 90 kilometres (56 mi) if altitude of the target is 500 metres (1,600 ft) above the ground.

The original S-300P utilises a combination of the 5N66M continuous-wave radar Doppler radar for target acquisition and the 30N6 FLAP LID A I/J-band phased-array digitally-steered tracking-and-engagement radar. Both are mounted on trailers. In addition, there is a trailer-mounted command centre and up to twelve trailer-mounted erector/launchers with four missiles each. The S-300PS/PM is similar but uses an upgraded 30N6 tracking-and-engagement radar with an integrated command post and has truck-mounted TELs.

If the battery was employed in an anti-ballistic-missile or anti-cruise-missile role, the 64N6 BIG BIRD E/F-band radar would also be included. It is capable of detecting ballistic missiles up to 1,000 km (620 mi) away, travelling at up to 10,000 km/h (6,200 mph), and cruise missiles up to 300 km (190 mi) away. It also employs electronic-beam steering and performs a scan once every twelve seconds.

The 36D6 TIN SHIELD radar can also be used to augment the S-300 system to provide earlier target detection than the FLAP LID radar allows. It can detect a missile-sized target flying at an altitude of 60 metres (200 ft) at least 20 km (12 mi) away, at an altitude of 100 m (330 ft) at least 30 km (19 mi) away, and at high altitude up to 175 km (109 mi) away. In addition a 64N6 BIG BIRD E/F band target-acquisition radar can be used, which has a maximum detection range of 300 km (190 mi).

The S-300 FC Radar Flap Lid can be mounted on a standard pylon.

Surveillance radar
GRAU index	NATO reporting name	Specialisation	Target detection range	Simultaneously detected targets	NATO frequency band	First used with	Notes
36D6	TIN SHIELD	–	180–360 km (110–220 mi)	120	E/F	S-300P	Industrial designation: ST-68UM; 350 kW to 1.23 MW power
76N6	CLAM SHELL	Low altitude detection			I	S-300P	
76N6	CLAM SHELL	Low altitude detection	120 km (75 mi)	180	I	S-300PMU	1.4 kW FM continuous wave
64N6	BIG BIRD	Regiment radar	300 km (190 mi)	300	C	S-300PMU-1	
96L6E	CHEESE BOARD	All altitude detection	300 km	100		S-300PMU-1	
9S15	BILL BOARD	–	250 km (160 mi)	250	F	S-300V	
9S19	HIGH SCREEN	Sector tracking		16		S-300V	
MR-75 (Note: Not a GRAU index. GRAU indices only apply to land-based versions.)	TOP STEER	Naval	300 km		D/E	S-300F	
MR-800 Voskhod	TOP PAIR	Naval	200 km (120 mi)		C/D/E/F	S-300F	

Target tracking/missile guidance
GRAU index	NATO reporting name	NATO frequency band	Target detection range	Simultaneously tracked targets	Simultaneously engaged targets	First used with	Notes
30N6	FLAP LID A	I/J		4	4	S-300P	
30N6E(1)	FLAP LID B	H-J	200 km (120 mi)	6	6	S-300PMU	Phased array
30N6E2	FLAP LID B	I/J	200 km	6	6	S-300PMU-2	
9S32-1	GRILL PAN	Multi-band	140–150 km (87–93 mi)	6	6	S-300V	
3R41 Volna	TOP DOME	I/J	100 km (62 mi)			S-300F	

=== Missiles ===
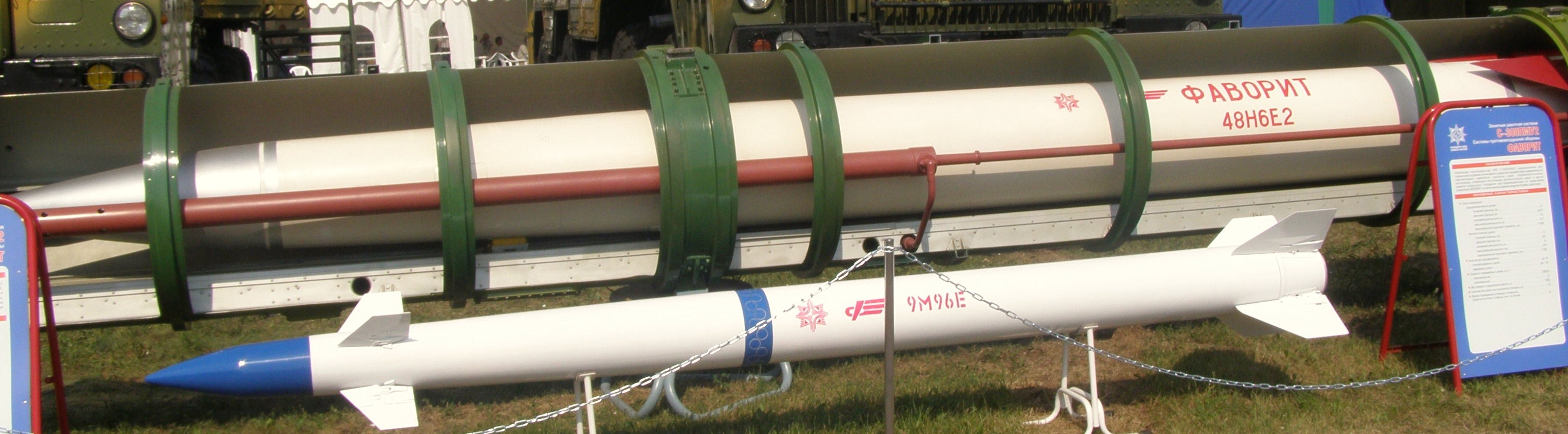
48N6E2 and 9M96E missiles for the Russian S-300PMU-2 (SA-20B Gargoyle) air defence system

Missile specifications
GRAU index	Year of initial production	Range	Maximum velocity	Maximum target Speed	Length	Diameter	Weight	Warhead	Guidance	First used with
5V55K	1975	47 km (29 mi)	2,000 m/s (7,200 km/h; 4,500 mph)	1,160 m/s (4,200 km/h; 2,600 mph)	7.25 m (23.8 ft)	514 mm (20.2 in)	1,480 kg (3,260 lb)	130 kg (290 lb)	Command	S-300P
5V55R	1981	75 km (47 mi)	2,000 m/s (7,200 km/h; 4,500 mph)	1,200 m/s (4,300 km/h; 2,700 mph)	7.25 m (23.8 ft)	514 mm (20.2 in)	1,665 kg (3,671 lb)	130 kg (290 lb)	Track-via-missile	S-300P
5V55KD	after 1982	75–90 km (47–56 mi)	1,900 m/s (4,250 mph)	1,150 m/s (2,572 mph)	7 m (23 ft)	450mm	1,450 kg (3,200 lb)	133 kg (293 lb)	Command	S-300PT
5V55RUD									Track-via-missile	
5V55U	1992	150 km (93 mi)	2,000 m/s (4,470 mph)		7 m (23 ft)	450mm	1,470 kg (3,240 lb)	133 kg (293 lb)	SAGG	S-300PT
48N6	1990	150 km (93 mi)	1,900 m/s (6,800 km/h; 4,300 mph)	2,800 m/s (10,000 km/h; 6,300 mph)	7.5 m (25 ft)	519 mm (20.4 in)	1,799 kg (3,966 lb)	143 kg (315 lb)		S-300PM
48N6P-01	1992	195 km (121 mi)	2,000 m/s (4,470 mph)	2,800 m/s (6,415 mph)	7.5 m (25 ft)	519mm	1,800 kg (4,000 lb)	150 kg (330 lb)	SAGG	S-300PMU
9M82		13–100 km (8.1–62.1 mi); 30 km (98,000 ft) alt	2,600 m/s (5,800 mph)		9.9 m (32 ft)	1215mm	4,685 kg (10,329 lb)	150 kg (330 lb)	Semi-active radar homing/Command	S-300V
9M83	1985	6–75 km (3.7–46.6 mi); 25 km (82,000 ft) alt	1,700 m/s (3,800 mph)		7.9 m (26 ft)	915mm	2,290 kg (5,050 lb)	150 kg (330 lb)	Semi-active radar homing/Command	S-300V
9M83ME	1990	200 km (120 mi)								S-300VM
9M96E1	1999	40 km (25 mi)	900 m/s (2,010 mph)	4,800–5,000 m/s (10,737–11,185 mph)			330 kg (730 lb)	24 kg (53 lb)	Active radar homing	S-300PMU
9M96E2	1999	120 km (75 mi)	1,000 m/s (2,240 mph)	4,800–5,000 m/s (10,737–11,185 mph)		240mm	420 kg (930 lb)	24 kg (53 lb)	Active radar homing	S-300PMU
40N6	2018	400 km (250 mi)							Active radar homing	S-400

=== Means of camouflage and protection ===
Decoys – sometimes equipped with additional devices to simulate electromagnetic radiation in the infrared, optical, and radar - are used for imitating components of S-300 system.

Additional means of masking are used, such as MKT-2, MKT-3 and Volchitsa-KR camouflage nets.

34Ya6E Gazetchik-E system might be used for protection against anti-radiation missiles. A combined MAWS/decoy/aerosole/chaff system is claimed by the developer to have the 85% to 95% probability to defeat a single attacking HARM missile. SPN-30 and Pelena-1 radar jamming systems are also used against airborne radars.

When using a prepared position for prolonged time, revetments might be used for TELs and additional equipment.

== Comparison with other systems ==
Official designation of unit		S-300PMU	S-300PMU1	S-300PMU2	S-300VM/S-300V4	Patriot PAC-2	Patriot PAC-3
Range of, km	aerodynamic target	5–90	5–150	3–200	200 (250)	3–160	15, at most 20 / 0.3–20
Range of, km	ballistic targets	at most 35	at most 40	5–40	40	20	15–45 (20) possible max 50
Height defeat, km	aerodynamic target	0.025–27	0.01–27	0.01–27	0.025–30 /?–37	0.06–24	15
Height defeat, km	ballistic targets	(?)	(?)	2–25	1–30	3–12	15(?). 15, possible max 20.
Maximum target speed, m/s		1,150, at most 1,300 (for the escort 3000)	at most 2,800 (for the escort 10000 km/h)	at most 2,800	4,500 of ballistic targets	at most 2,200	at most 1,600
Maximum speed of the rocket complex, m/s		at most 2,000	2000	1,900	2,600 and 1,700/7.5M or 9M (more 3000) and (?)	1,700	(?) approximately 1,500
Number of simultaneously guided anti-aircraft missiles by one unit		at most 12	at most 12	at most 72	at most 48	at most 9	
Number of simultaneously engaged targets by one unit		at most 6	at most 6	at most 36	at most 24	at most 9	at most 9
Mass of a rocket, kg		1,400–1,600	(?)	330–1,900	(?)	900	312
Warhead weight, kg		150	(?)	180	(?)	91	74
Minimum time between missile launches, seconds		3–5	3–5	3 (0 at start from different CARRIERS MISSILES)	1.5 (0 at start from different CARRIERS MISSILES)	3–4 (1 at start from different CARRIERS MISSILES)	(?)
Set up time and clotting time of starting complex, minutes		5	5	5	5	15/30	15/30(?)
Means of transportation		Wheeled	Wheeled	Wheeled	tracked	semi trailer	semi trailer

== Operational history ==
Russian officials have stated that the system has performed well in real-world exercises. In 1991, 1992, and 1993, various versions of the S-300 destroyed ballistic missiles and other objects in exercises, with a high success rate (90% or more if 1 missile interceptor is used).

In 1995, it was the first system to destroy a R-17 Elbrus Scud missile in the air. China is to test the S-300PMU2's effectiveness in destroying targets in real exercises. The planned targets include a UAV (4.6 kilometres (2.9 mi)), a simulated strategic bomber (186 kilometres (116 mi)), tactical missiles (range of the system to the point of interception 34 kilometres (21 mi) and a height of 17.7 kilometres (11.0 mi)), and pinpoint missiles. In April 2005, NATO held a combat exercise in France and Germany called Trial Hammer 05 to practice Suppression of Enemy Air Defenses missions. The Slovak Air Force brought an S-300PMU along, providing an opportunity for NATO to become familiar with the system.

Israel's purchase of F-35 Lightning II fighters was allegedly intended in part to nullify the threat of S-300 missiles that were, at the time the fighters were initially sought, part of a potential arms sale to Iran. The fighter jets were eventually deployed by Israel in late October 2024 and disabled Iran's last three S-300 batteries in the first wave in a three-waved airstrike, thereby severely compromising Iran's air defenses.

In 2010, Russia announced that its military had deployed the S-300 systems in breakaway Abkhazia in 2008, leading to condemnation from the government of Georgia.

=== Syria ===
After a Russian Sukhoi Su-24 was shot down over Syria in November 2015, Russia deployed S-300 and S-400 systems to the region – some to the Khmeimim Air Base, some with the Russian cruiser Moskva.

On 17 September 2018, a Syrian S-200 system downed a Russian military plane, killing 15 Russian service members. Moscow accused Israel of indirectly causing this incident, and announced that to keep its troops safe, it would supply Syria with modern S-300 anti-missile rocket systems. Israeli Prime Minister Benjamin Netanyahu objected to the move in a telephone call with Russian president Vladimir Putin, stating that the delivery of S-300 anti-missile rocket systems to "irresponsible players" would be dangerous for the region.

In 2020, Syrian military officials criticized the S-300 air defense systems supplied by Russia, saying they failed to protect Syrian sites from Israeli strikes. One official criticized the detection abilities of the system's radar.

On 17 May 2022, Israel said that a Russian-operated S-300 missile system fired a missile at a F-16 operated by the IAF. If confirmed, it would be the first time Russian forces have fired on Israeli jets. According to Channel 13 news, Russia fired 13 missiles at an Israeli F-16, but none of the jets were intercepted by the missile salvos. On 26 July, Israeli Defence Minister Benny Gantz confirmed the initial report of one missile being fired by a Russian-operated S-300 system. However, he downplayed the incident as a "one-off", further stating that "our jets weren't even in the area". As the missile had not locked on, it was no threat to Israeli jets. It still remains the first use of an S-300 against the Israeli Air Force.

=== 2020 Nagorno-Karabakh conflict ===
During the 2020 Nagorno-Karabakh conflict, the S-300 system took active part in an armed conflict for the first time, different versions being listed in the active inventory of both sides. The Armenian systems were initially deployed around Yerevan. On 29 September 2020, Azerbaijan reported that Armenia was moving its S-300 systems closer to the conflict zone, and vowed their destruction. On 30 September 2020, Azerbaijani Armed Forces claimed the destruction of an Armenian S-300 system without providing further details. The first alleged combat firing of the S-300 happened during the night between 1 and 2 October when the Armenian Ministry of Defense claimed that Armenian S-300s had downed three Azerbaijani drones (not missiles as initially claimed) bound for Yerevan.

On 17 October 2020, Azerbaijani Armed Forces claimed the destruction of two radar elements that were part of an active Armenian S-300 SAM site being hit by a Bayraktar TB2 UCAV.

=== Russo-Ukrainian war ===
At the time of the beginning of Russo-Ukrainian war on 24 February 2022, Ukraine had around 100 active S-300 batteries with as many as 300 launchers inherited upon the collapse of the Soviet Union in 1991. By 8 April, the Russians had knocked out at least 21 of the S-300 launchers that outside analysts confirmed with photos or videos, with the actual total of destroyed launchers likely higher. Ukrainian President Volodymyr Zelenskyy, in his message of 16 March to the U.S. Congress, had consequently asked specifically for help acquiring more of the long-range missiles. "You know what kind of defense systems we need: S-300 and other similar systems", Zelenskyy said.

The United States and its allies tried to figure out how to deliver S-300s to Ukraine. One plan was for Slovakia to transfer to Ukraine its single battery of S-300s, in exchange for the United States or some other country supplying Slovakia with a new air-defense system, such as the American-made Patriot. A few days after Zelenskyy asked for S-300s, Germany agreed to deploy some of its Patriots to Slovakia, as part of a NATO battlegroup.

On 30 March, Prime Minister Eduard Heger of Slovakia told CNN that he supported sending some of his country's own S-300s to Ukraine "because this is the equipment that Ukraine needs the most". On 8 April, U.S. President Joe Biden confirmed that Slovakia had transferred a Soviet-era S-300 system to Ukraine and said that the U.S. would reposition an American Patriot missile system to Slovakia in return. It appears that only one battery that was donated, which was a system that Slovakia inherited from the dissolution of Czechoslovakia in 1993.

On 11 April, the Associated Press reported Russia's claims to have destroyed several air defense systems in Ukraine over the previous two days, indicating a renewed push to gain air superiority and take out weapons Kyiv described as crucial, ahead of a broad new Russian offensive in the east. Moscow claimed to have hit four S-300 missile launchers provided by a European country it did not name, but never showed any concrete evidence of that. Slovakia had given Ukraine such a system the previous week, but denied that it had been destroyed. Two attacks were previously reported by Russia on similar systems in other places.

In early April, Iran also reportedly returned a large number of S-300 systems, for use against Ukraine, which it had purchased from Russia in 2007, along with a quantity of its own Iranian-made version, the Bavar-373, which has similar capabilities. Iran Foreign Minister Hossein Amir-Abdollahian refuted allegations of arms transfers to Russia in a call with Ukraine Foreign Minister Dmytro Kuleba.

On 8 July, the governor of the Mykolaiv Oblast, Vitaly Kim, claimed that Russia had been using S-300 missiles in a land-attack role by fitting them with GPS guidance and that some 12 missiles were fired using such guidance. On 30 September, The Wall Street Journal reported the claim of Kyrylo Tymoshenko, an adviser to President Zelenskyy, that 16 Russian S-300 missiles configured for ground-attack struck near Zaporizhzhia, killing at least 30 civilians and wounding 50 others. Debris from S-300 missiles was found after having struck buildings in Kharkiv on 8 October. Analysts from McKenzie Intelligence Services and the Center for Strategic and International Studies said that these missiles were likely from Russian systems repurposed for ground attack due to the dwindling stock of more precise dedicated anti-surface missiles.

Stationary surface targets do not necessarily require retrofitting, as the original design accommodates them – particularly those that emit radiation, such as radars, which S-300 missiles can target precisely with onboard radiation tracking. However, some of the reported surface-to-surface missile strikes by S-300 missiles may actually be instances of Ukrainian S-300s failing to intercept targets, and subsequently falling onto civilian areas on the ground. The most notable case of such unintentional strikes occurred on 15 November 2022, when a stray S-300 missile on a ballistic trajectory fell near the village of Przewodow in Poland, killing 2.

On 14 April 2023, Sloviansk was hit by seven S-300 missiles, which killed at least 11 people. Russian S-300 strikes in Pokrovsk Raion on 6 January 2024 killed 11 and injured 8 according to local officials.

On 10 June 2024, Ukrainian forces launched an attack near Chornomorskiy in Crimea destroying S-300 missile launchers.

On 21 August 2024, the Ukrainian military claimed to have struck a Russian S-300 air defense system in Rostov Oblast possibly with a Neptune missile.

== Operators and other versions ==
Operators Current Former

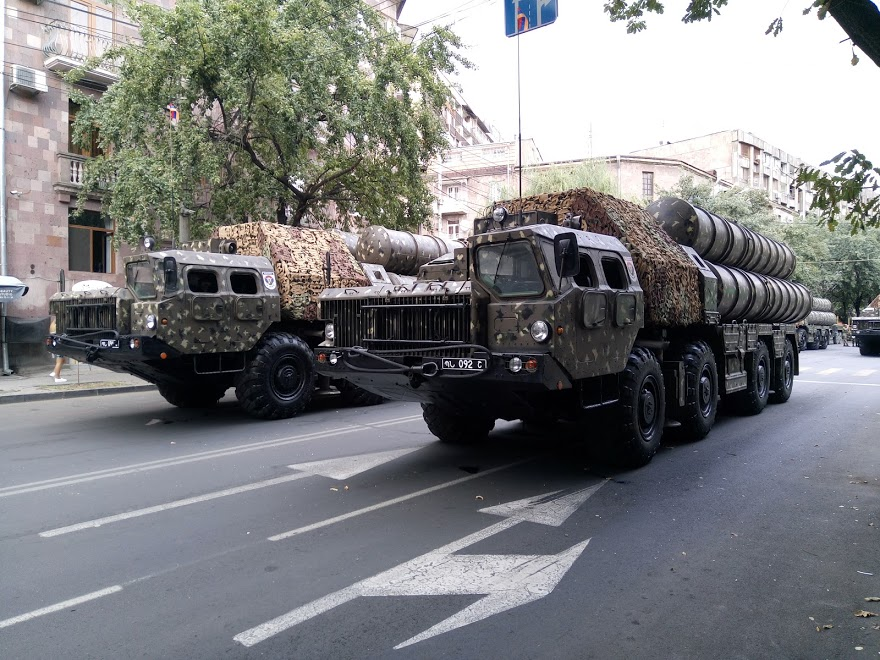
An S-300 of the Armenian Air Force during a parade in 2016

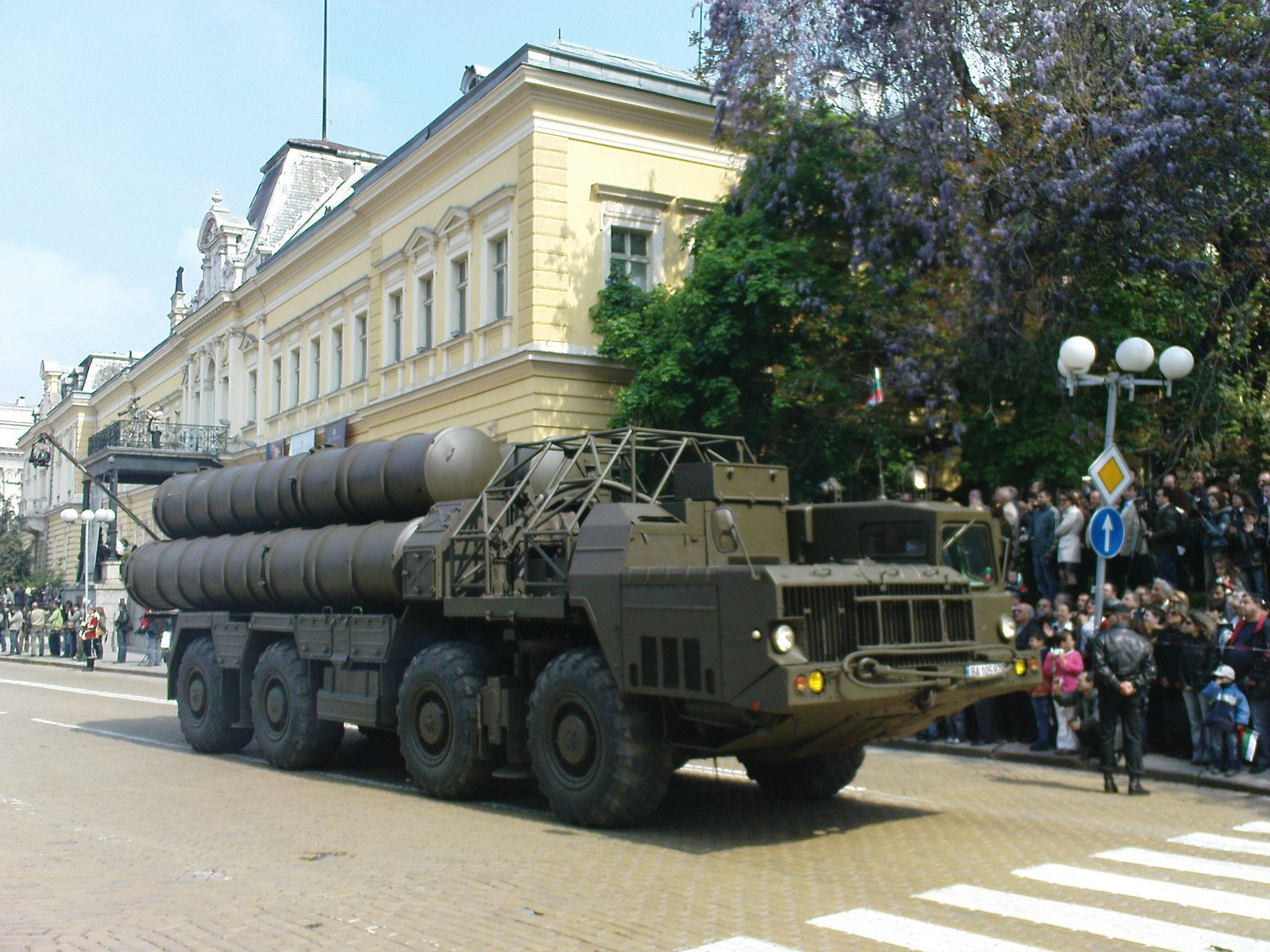
An S-300 of the Bulgarian Air Force

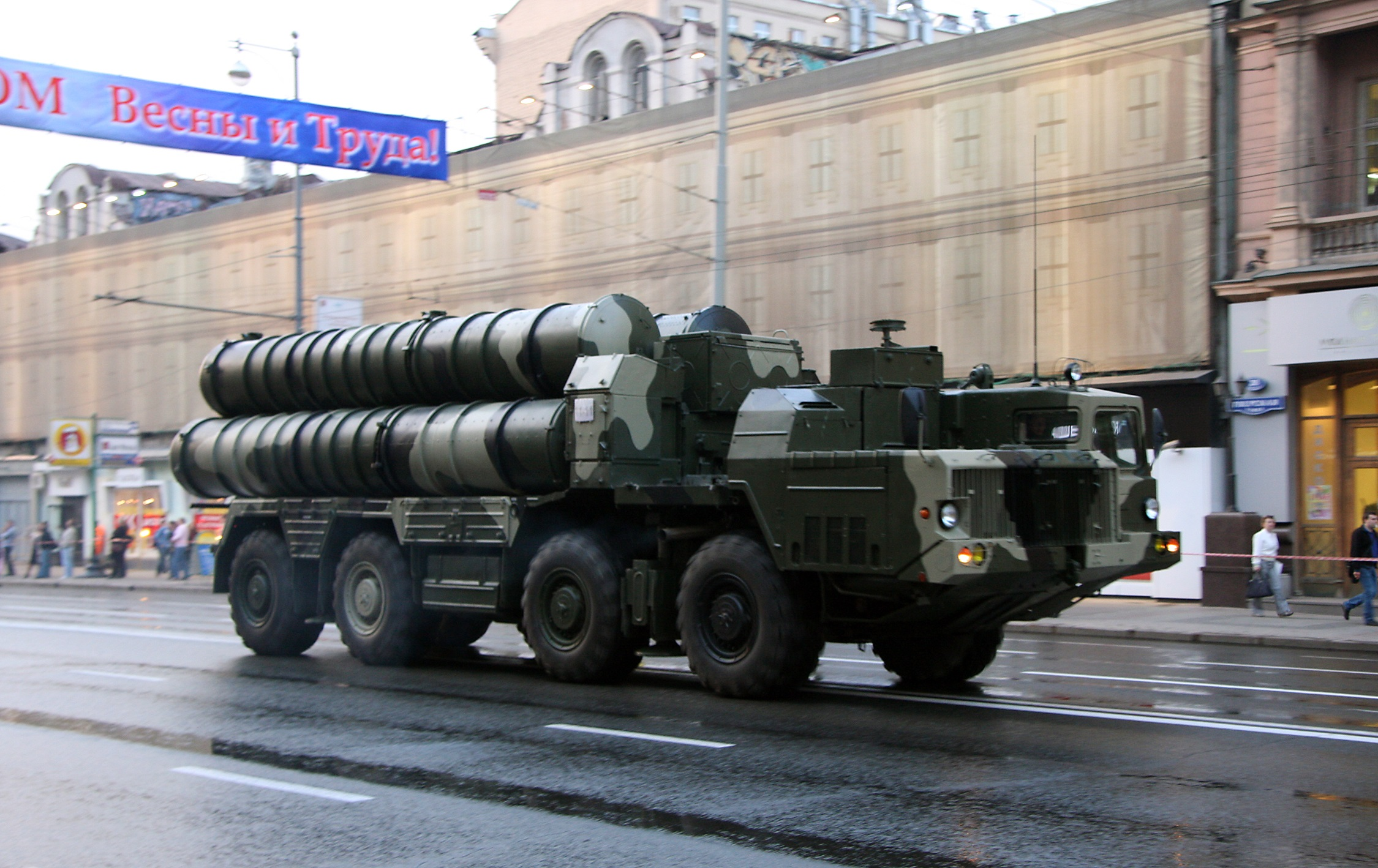
Russian S-300PMU2 during the Victory Day Parade 2009

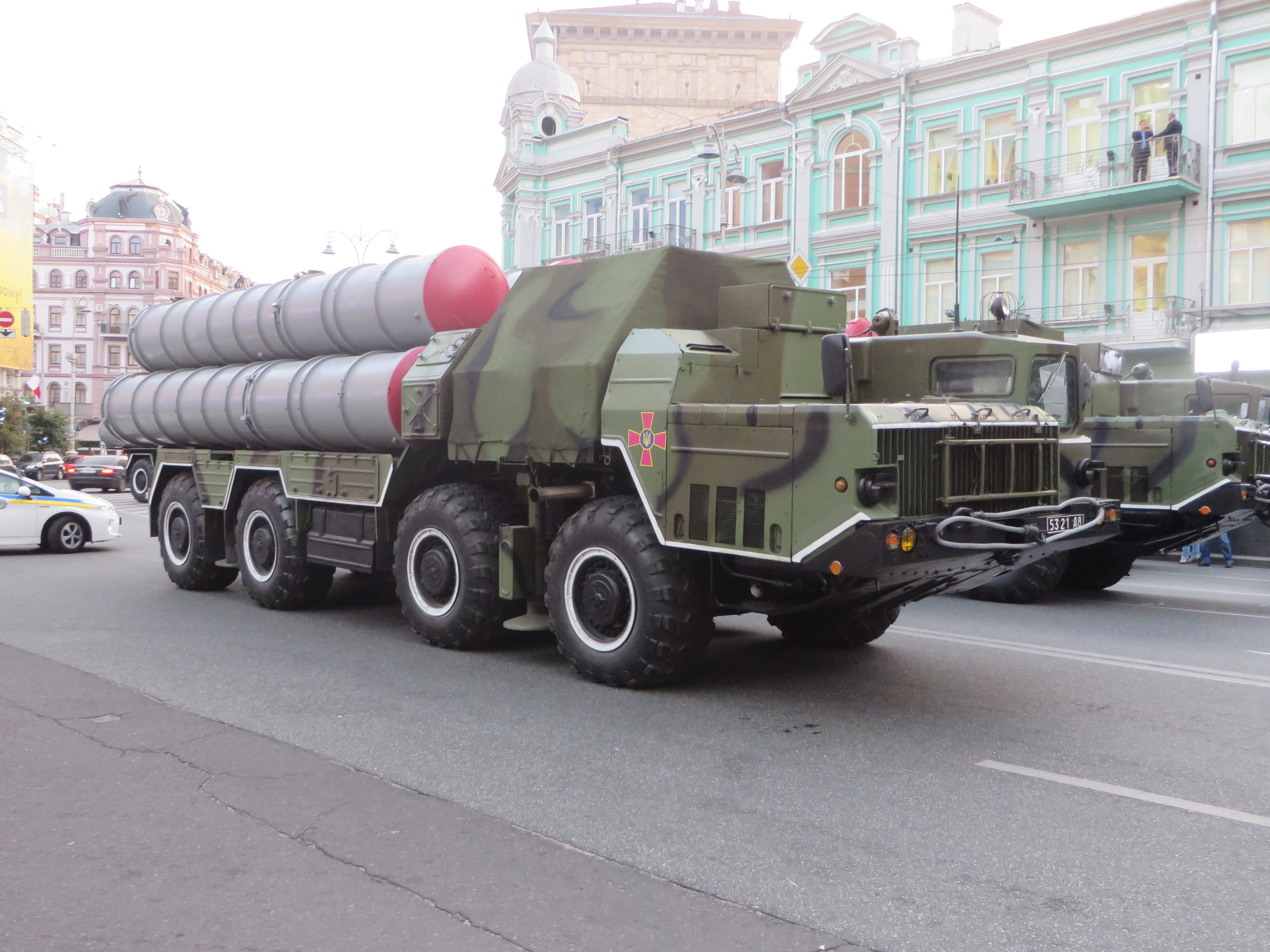
Ukrainian S-300P launcher during a parade in 2014

The S-300 is mainly used in Eastern Europe and Asia, although sources are inconsistent about which countries possess the system.

- Algeria – 8 regiments of S-300PMU2
- Armenia – 50 systems, unknown variant
- Azerbaijan bought two S-300PMU2 (SA-20B) SAM battalions for US$300 million in 2010, delivered in 2011
- Belarus – S-300PS systems delivered from Russia in 2007 to replace older S-300 model in the Belarusian inventory. Four divisions of S-300 missiles to be delivered in 2014.
- Bulgaria – 8 S-300 launchers in service as of 2024. Divided into 2 units with 6 launchers each .
- China – China first acquired the S-300PMU-1 in 1993, and later became the first customer of the S-300PMU-2, in 2004. China also built the HQ-15 with the maximum range upgraded from 150 to 200 km (93 to 124 mi). The total number of the S-300PMU/1/2 and HQ-15/18 batteries in the PLA are approximately 40 and 60, respectively, as of 2008. The total number of the missiles is well above 1,600, with about 300 launcher platforms. Five such SAM battalions are deployed and in active duty around the Beijing region, six battalions are in the Taiwan strait region, and the rest are in major cities such as Shanghai, Chengdu, and Dalian. Two Rif (SA-N-6) systems were purchased in 2002 for the Chinese Navy's Type 051C destroyers. By 2011, China had obtained 15 battalions (4 systems) of the S-300PMU-2.
- Egypt – The S-300VM "Antey-2500" missile system was ordered in 2014, as part of a billion-dollar Egyptian-Russian arms deal signed later that year. The $1 billion contract comprises 4 batteries, a command post and other external elements. In 2015, Russia started delivering the system components, and Egyptian soldiers began their training in Russian training centers. By the end of 2017, all batteries had been delivered to Egypt. Russia is in talks with Egypt on the delivery of additional Antey-2500 systems.
- Iran – Originally purchased in 2007. Russia maintained a self-imposed ban on the sale of the S-300 until the easing of some US sanctions as part of the Iran nuclear deal framework in April 2015 and subsequent Joint Comprehensive Plan of Action. Iran received four S-300PMU2 batteries from Russia in 2016, each consisting of a 96L6E target-acquisition radar, a 30N6E2 target-engagement radar, and four 5P85TE2 towed transporter-erector-launchers (TELs). The systems are supported by two 64N6E2 battle-management radars and linked using FL-95 antenna masts. The S-300s are operated by the Islamic Republic of Iran Air Defense Force. During air strikes on military targets in Iran in April and on Oct. 26 2024, Israeli aircraft disabled all of Iran's Russian S-300 anti-aircraft missile systems after Iranian radar systems were “breached” causing their screens to freeze.
- Kazakhstan – 10 battalions after the refurbishment (PS – version) (2009 or later), 5 free of charge (2014), and 5 free of charge (2015).
- North Korea – North Korea has conducted tests with a system called Pongae-5 (KN-06).
- Russia – All variations. (1900 (S-300PT/PS/PMU, 200 S-300V/S-300V1 in 2010)), 2000 total launchers. All production in 1994 (actually 1990) or older, all the S-300PM complexes have been repairing and upgrading (Favorit-S). The S-300P/PT has been retired before 2008, some S-300PS are in service, but were to be retired in 2012–2013. Modernization of all S-300P units to the S-300PM1 version was to end in 2014. The useful life of each was increased by 5 years. PM 1 was upgraded to version PM 2. By 2015, the S-300V4 was to have been delivered. Modernization of all S-300Vs to S-300V4s was to end in 2012.
- Ukraine – S-300PT, S-300PS, S-300PMU, S-300V1. Only six systems were kept in working order between 2004 and 2014; as a result, only 40% of Ukrainian S-300 systems were in good condition prior to 2014. Due to the war with Russia, Ukraine started repairing and bringing back to service several armaments, including several S-300 batteries, with at least 4 batteries overhauled in 2014–15. 34 launchers remained in Crimea after the 2014 Russian annexation of Crimea. Prior to the 2022 Russian invasion of Ukraine, the country had around 100 batteries. It received an additional battery from Slovakia in April 2022.
- Venezuela – Ordered 2 battalions of S-300VM "Antey-2500", which were delivered in May 2012.
- Vietnam – Bought two S-300PMU-1 systems (12 launchers) for nearly $300 million and RLS 96L6 after 2009. The systems were likely upgraded to the S-300PMU2 standard.

=== Former operators ===
- Czechoslovakia – One battalion created in 1990. Passed to Slovakia in 1993.
- East Germany – One S-300PMU system delivered in 1989. Inspected by West German Air Force personnel in late August 1990. Returned to the Soviet Union in September 1990 as "sensitive technology" after negotiations between East Germany and the USSR.
- Greece – An S-300 PMU1 system acquired after the Cyprus Missile Crisis and operated by HAF on Crete, consisting of 1 regiment/4 systems/8 fire units/32 launchers / 175 missiles. Greece first fired an S-300 during the White Eagle 2013 military exercise, which was the first time it was used since it had been bought 15 years earlier. According to Greek Defence Minister Nikolaos Panagiotopoulos, Greece was prepared to transfer its S-300 system to Ukraine in exchange for a PAC-3 Patriot missile system. Additionally stating that: "The same procedure applies to any other Russian made air defense system that they may want to send to Ukraine." However, Greek prime minister Kyriakos Mitsotakis denied Greece's preparedness to send the S-300 to Ukraine for concerns that this move would create a gap in Greece's air defence. Despite initially being wanted by Ukraine, the Hellenic Air Force will be sending the S-300 to Armenia.
- Slovakia – One S-300PMU battery and 48 5V55R missiles inherited from Czechoslovakia. 3 missiles were fired during an exercise in Bulgaria in 2015. The battery was donated to Ukraine in April 2022 in response to the 2022 Russian invasion of Ukraine.
- Ba'athist Syria – An order for 6 systems was signed in 2010. Syrian crews underwent training in Russia, and some of the S-300 components were delivered to Syria in 2013. Later, due to the weapons embargo against Syria and at the request of Israel, the deliveries were halted. (Note: Russian President Vladimir Putin ordered the acceleration of highly advanced Russian weapons supplies to Syria. Referring to S-300 anti-air systems and the nuclear-capable 9K720 Iskander (NATO reporting name SS-26 Stone) surface missiles. Since Syrian Air Defense Force teams have already trained in the Russian Federation on the handling of the S-300 interceptor batteries, they can go into service as soon as they are landed by one of Russia's daily airlifts to Syria. Russian air defence officials will supervise their deployment and prepare them for operation. According to President Vladimir Putin, components of the S-300 have been delivered to Syria but the delivery has not been completed. 2 SA-20B (4 batalions), contract 2010, fully prepared in 2012. Centre for Analysis of World Arms Trade (armstrade.org/english.shtml) SA-20B actually received in 2013) After the Russian Su-24 shootdown in November 2015, S-300 missile batteries were officially deployed to Latakia province for the protection of the Russian naval base and warships at Tartus. These are operated by Russian crews. Russia was reconsidering deliveries of the S-300 to Syria after the missile strikes against Syria in April 2018, but this did not happen. Following the Syrian military's downing of a Russian Il-20 aircraft in Syria in September 2018, using a S-200 system (for which Russia held Israel responsible), Russian defense minister Sergei Shoigu on 24 September said that within two weeks, the Syrian Army would receive S-300 systems. Though the S-300 variant was not specified, the stated range of the system was to be 250 kilometres (160 mi). On 2 October 2018, Shoigu told President Putin during a broadcast meeting that the delivery of the S-300 system to Syria had been completed a day prior. On 8 October 2018, the Russian news agency TASS reported that three S-300PM battalions had been given to Syria free of charge, citing "On 1 October three battalion sets of S-300PM systems of eight launchers each were delivered to Syria". According to the source, the deliveries also included more than 100 surface-to-air missiles for each battalion. It is operated by the Syrian Air Defense Force. In 2022, the systems were removed from Syria.
- Soviet Union – Passed onto successor states.

=== Evaluation-only operators ===
- United States – S-300P, devoid of electronics, purchased from Belarus in 1994. S-300V was purchased in Russia officially in the 1990s (complete set (except for 9S32 GRILL PAN multi-channel guidance radar)).

=== Cancelled ===
- Cyprus – S-300 PMU1 system transferred to Greece after the Cyprus Missile Crisis and operated by the HAF on Crete.

== See also ==
- Comparison of anti-ballistic missile systems
- List of medium-range and long-range SAMs
- Bavar 373 – (Iran)
- HQ-9 – (China)
- HQ-22 – (China)
- S-350E Vityaz 50R6 – (Russia)
- S-400 missile system – (Soviet Union, Russia)
- S-500 missile system – (Russia)
- Patriot missile system – (United States)

== Gallery ==
S-300V

The main components of the S-300V in the 2012 Technologies in Mechanical Engineering exhibition:
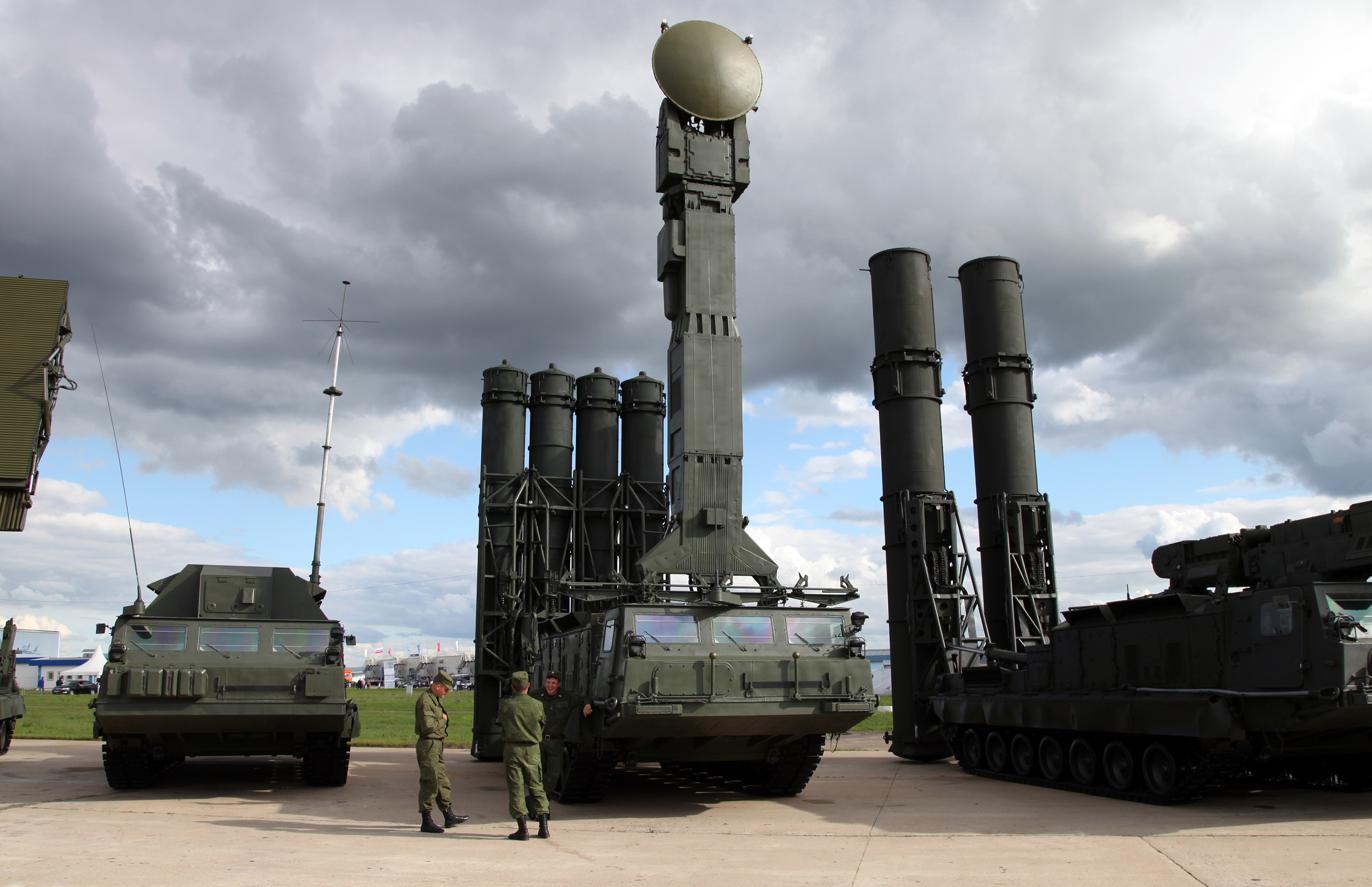
9A83 TELAR.

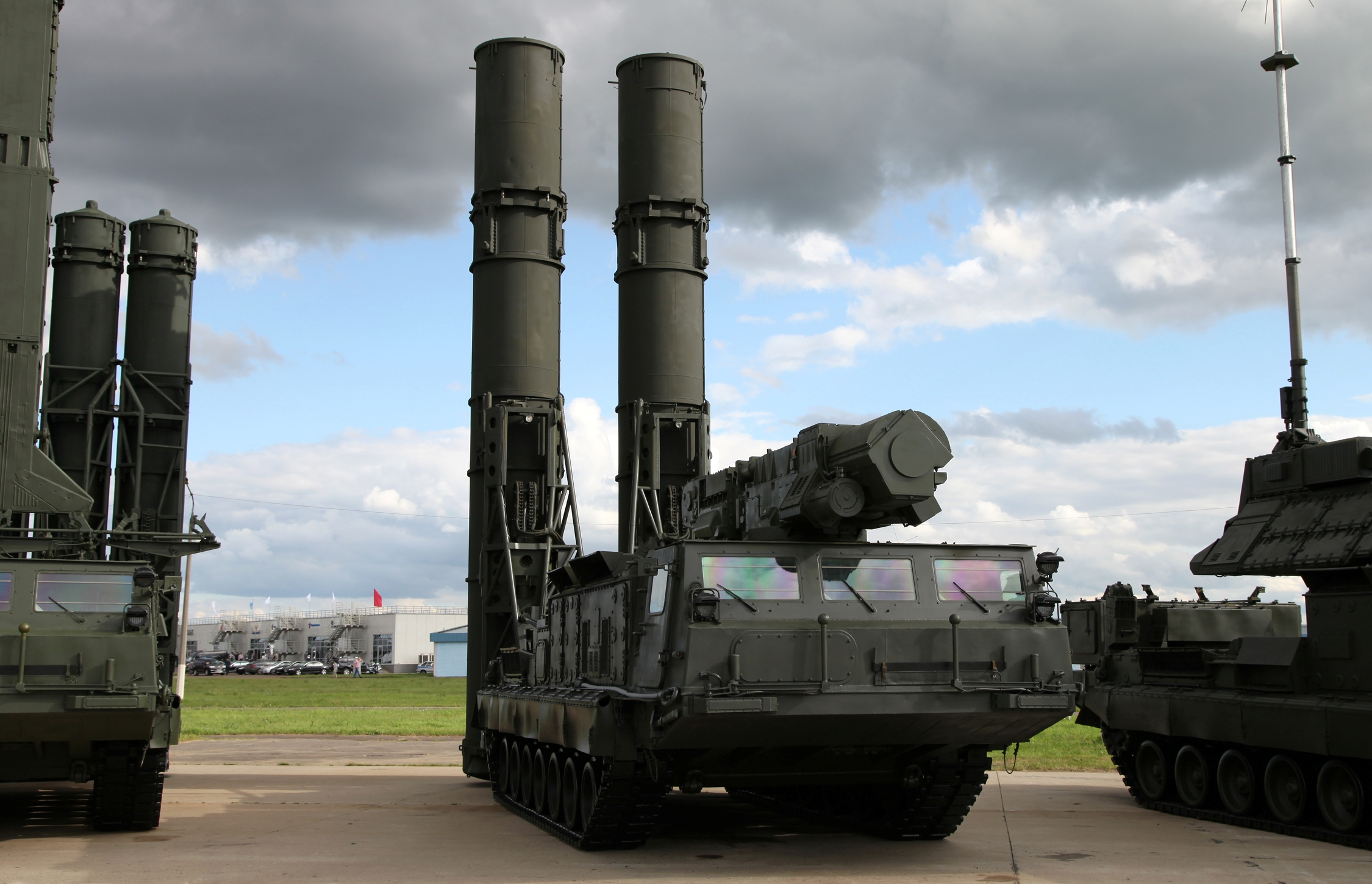
S-300V Launcher 9A82.

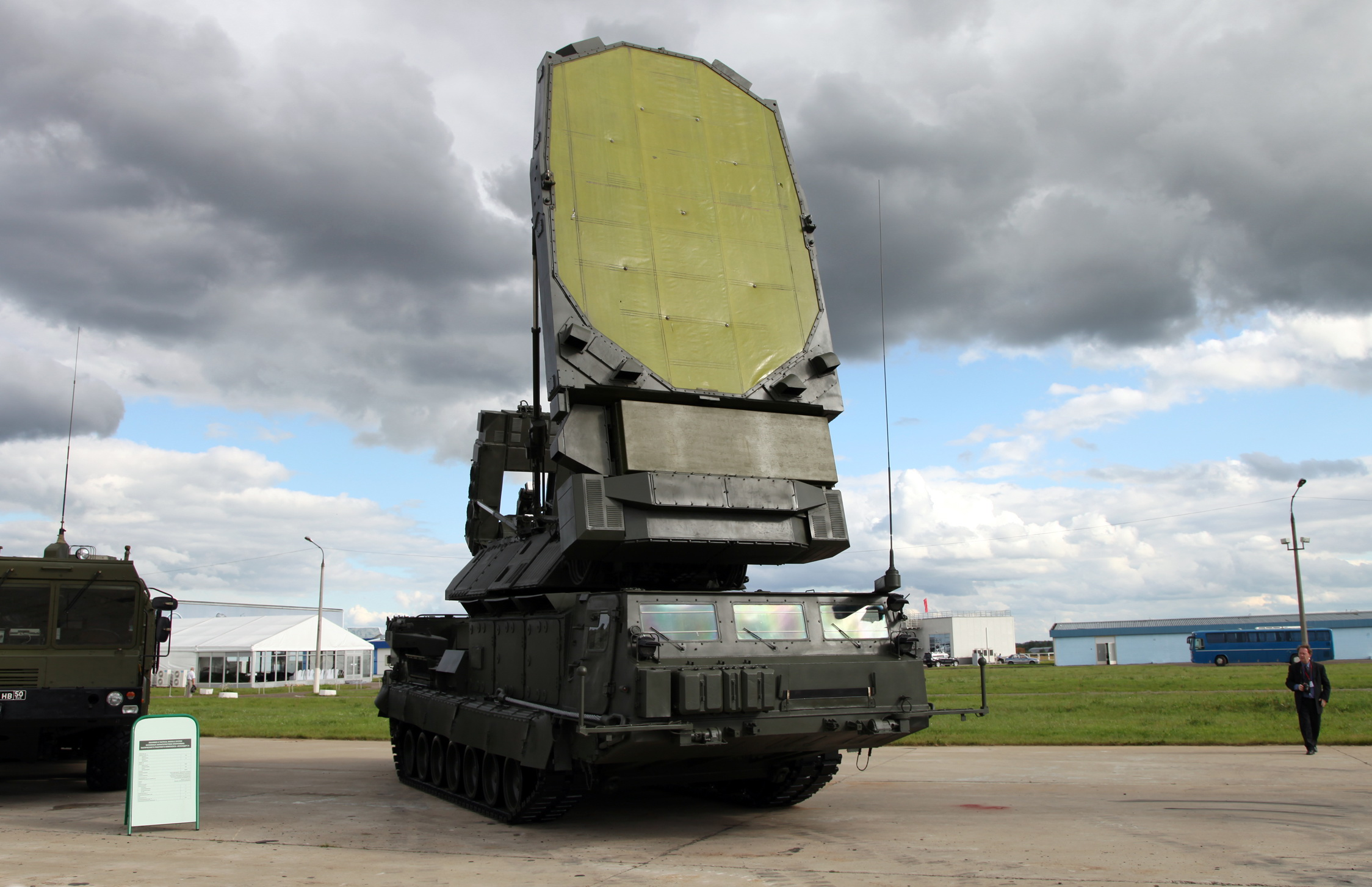
9S19M2 Imbir acquisition radar.

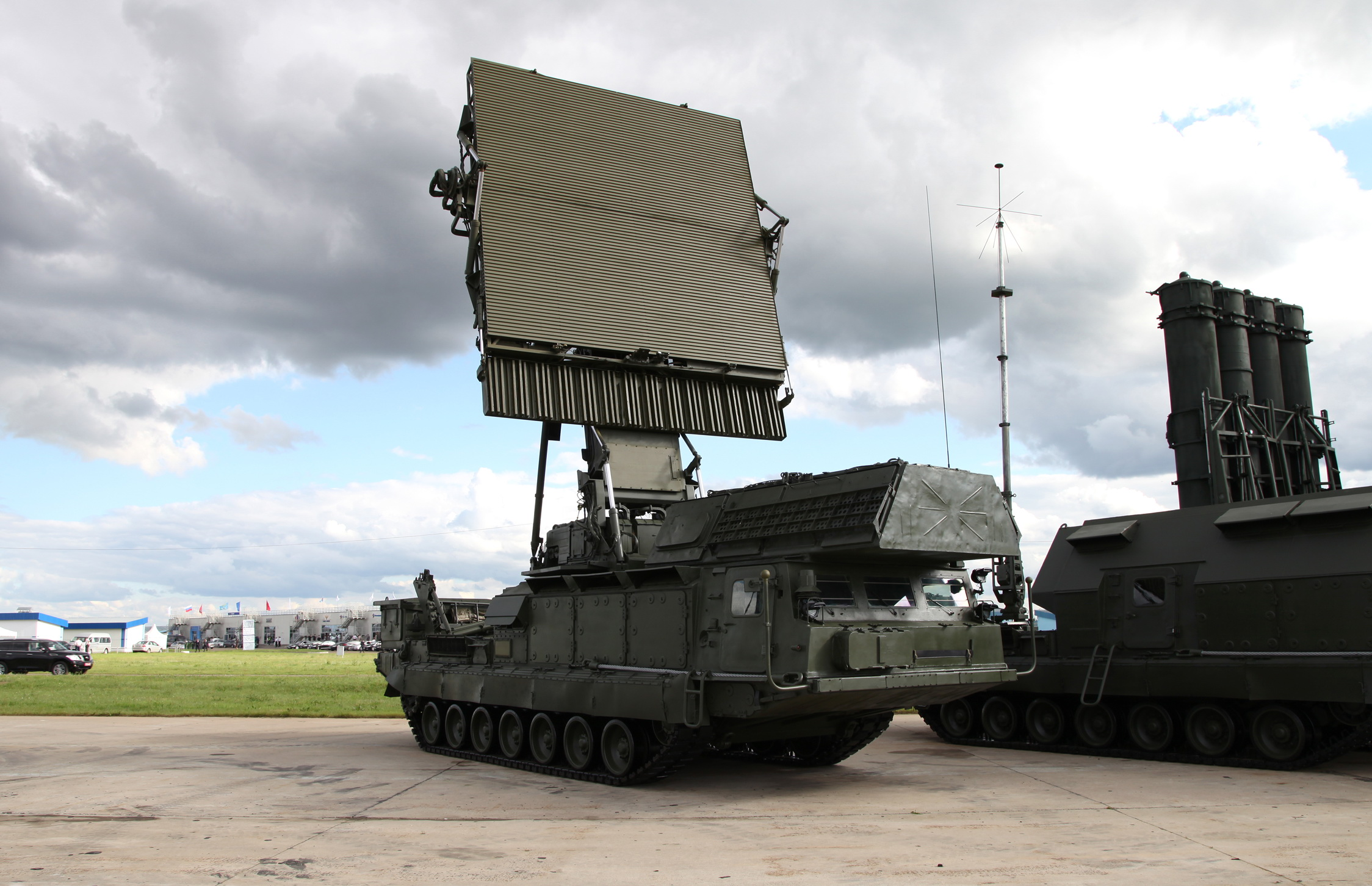
9S15M Obzor-3 round sight acquisition radar.

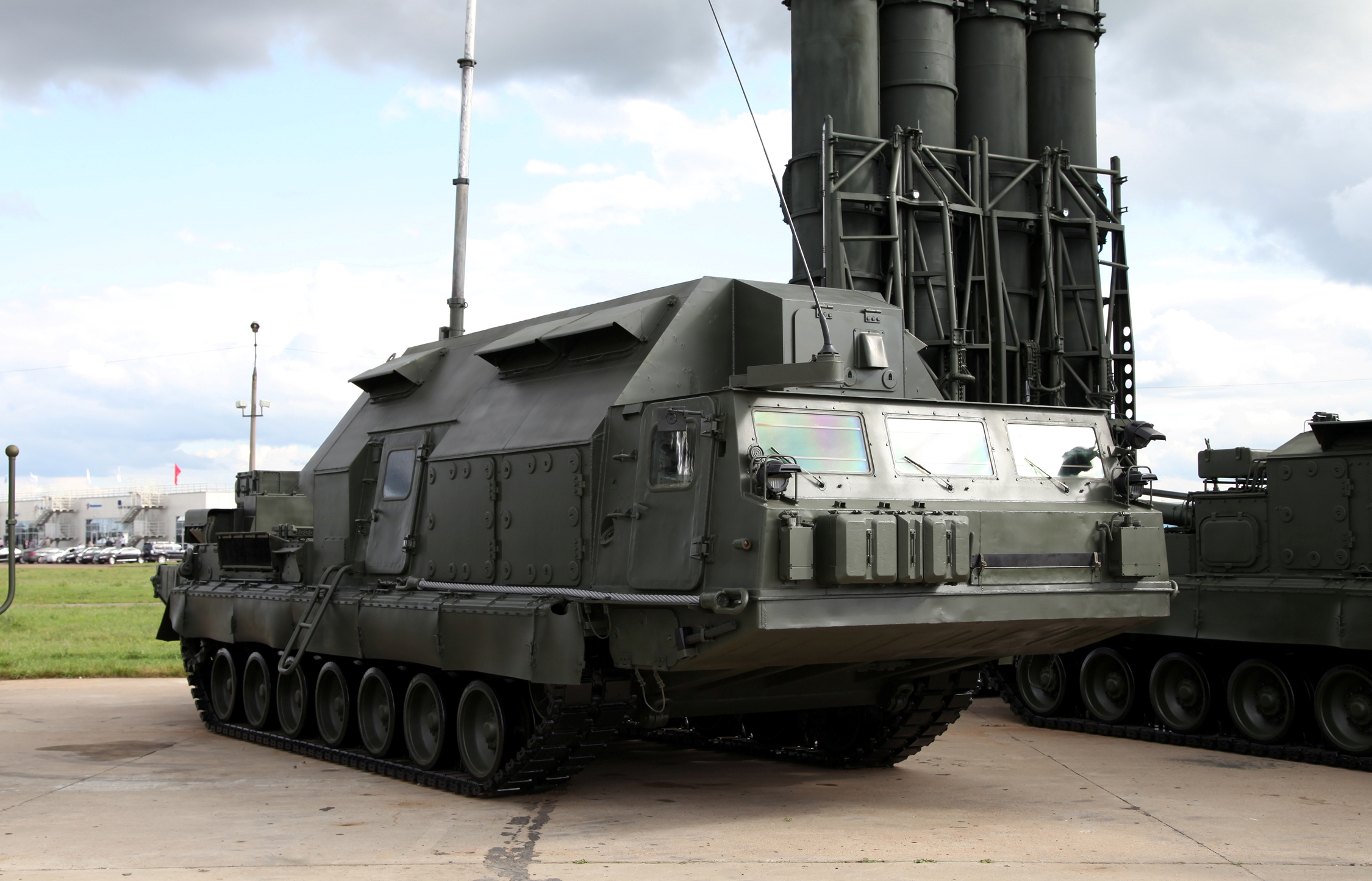
9S457 self-propelled command post.

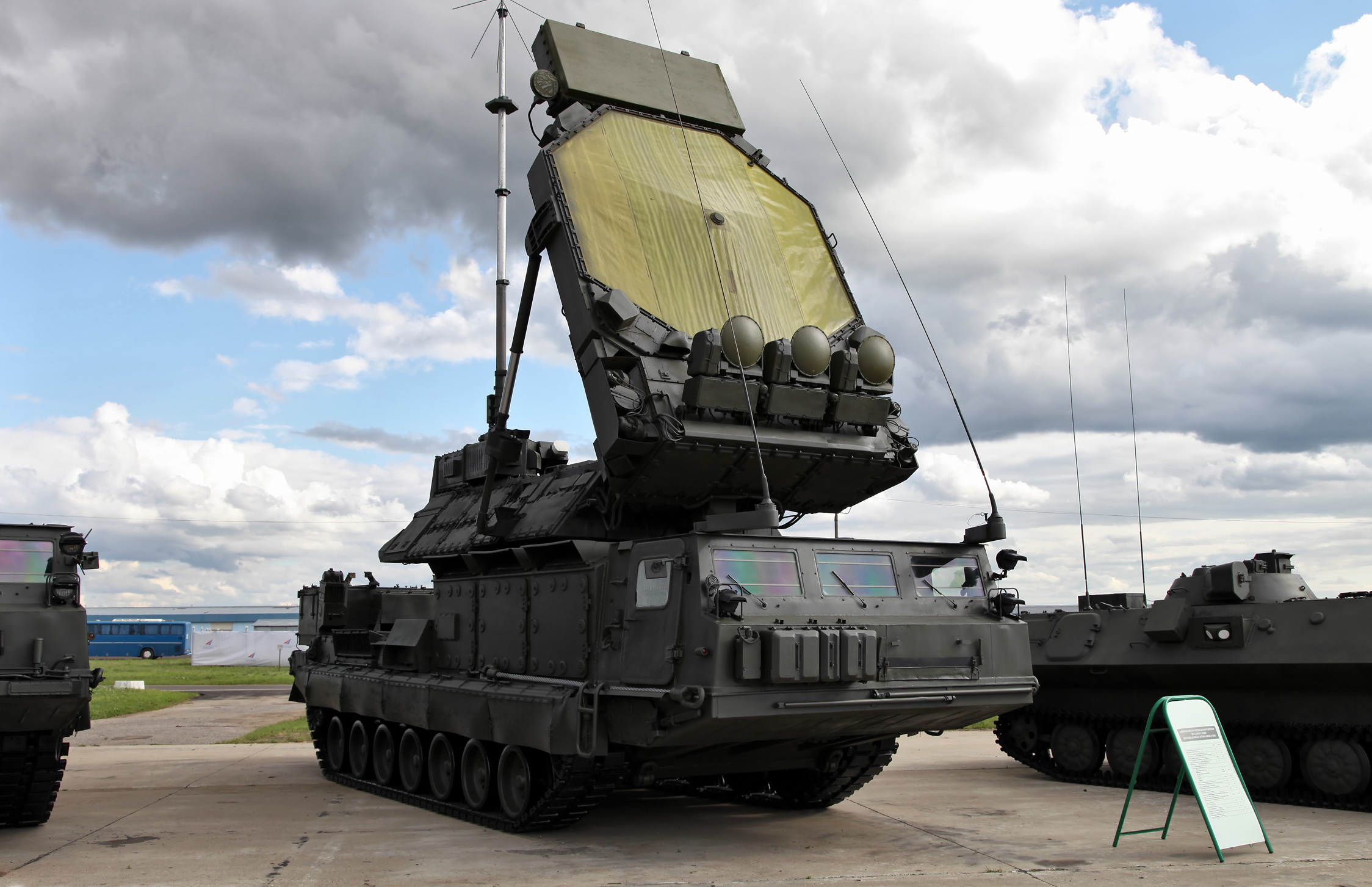
9S32 multichannel missile engagement guidance radar.

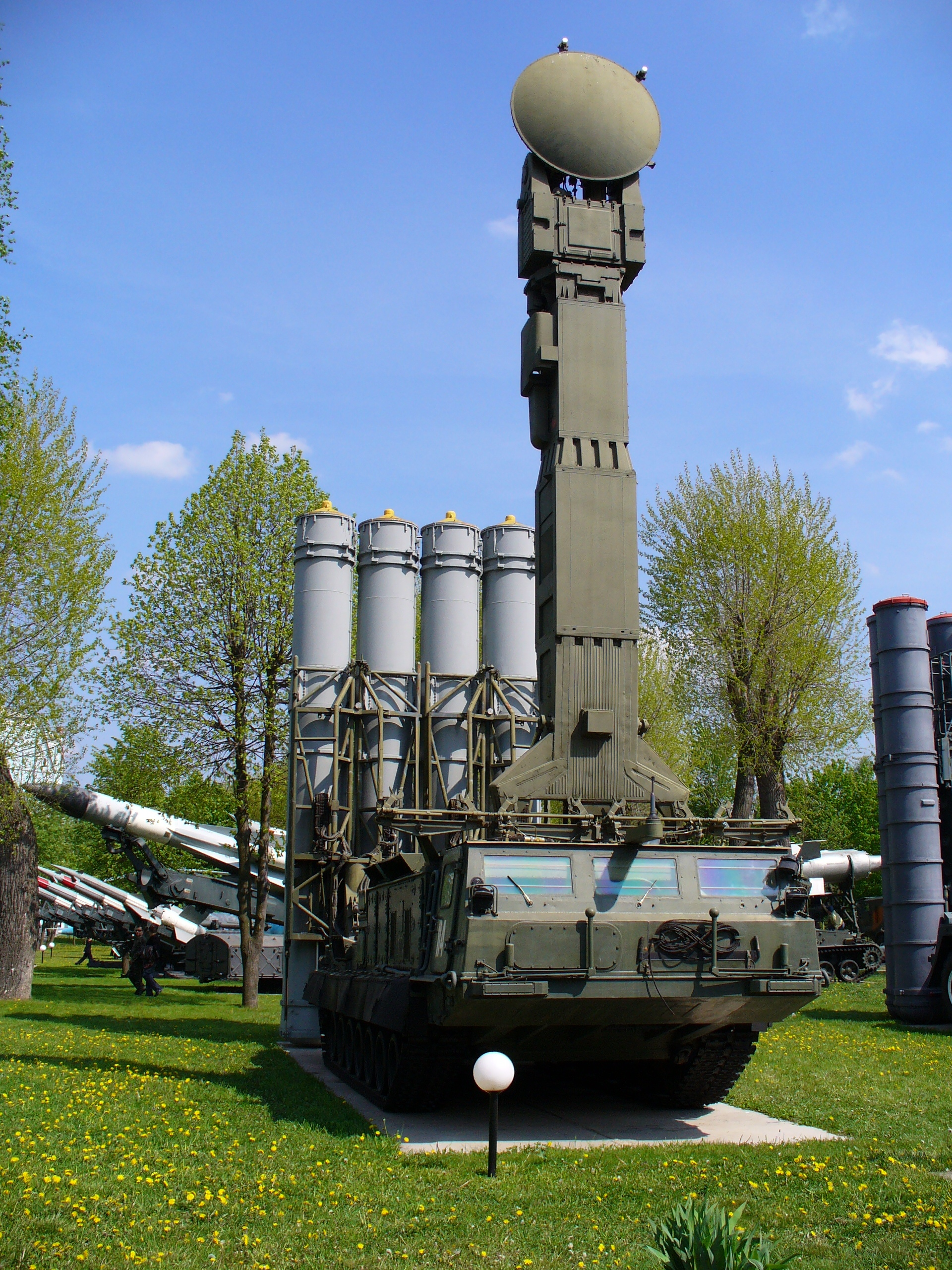
S-300V with 9M83 missiles.

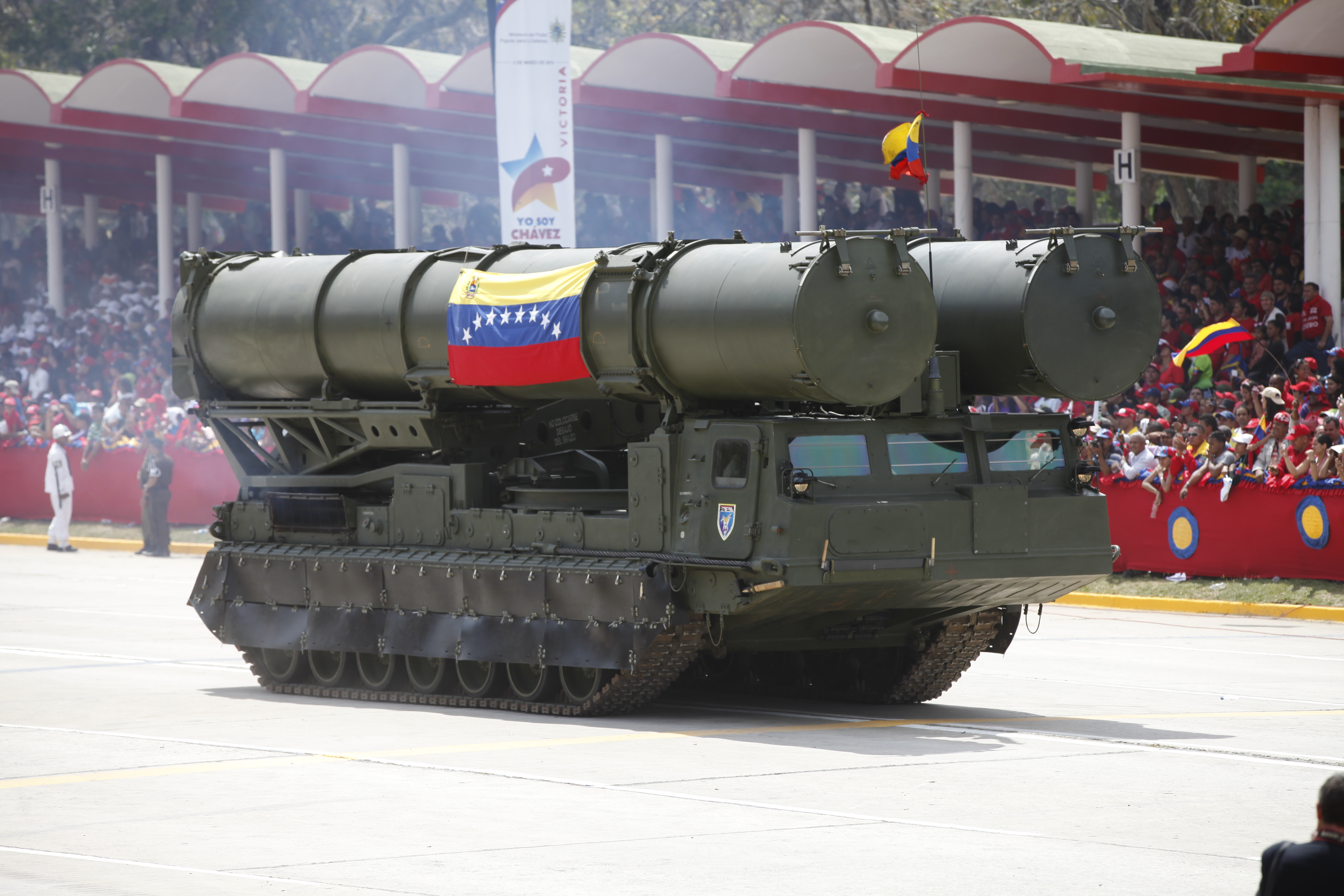
S-300VM during a 2014 display in Caracas, Venezuela.

S-300P/PT/PS

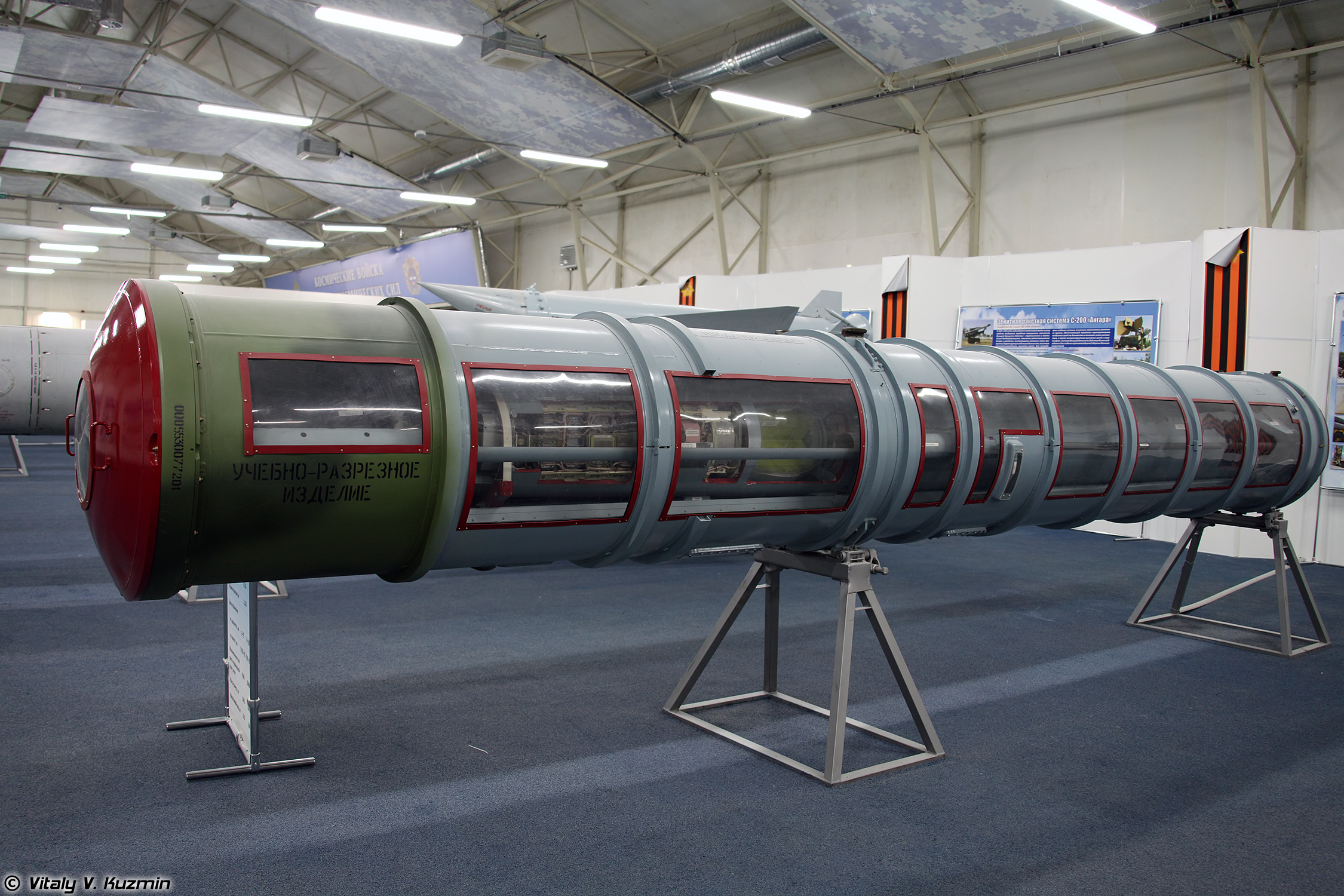
Transport-launch container with a 5V55 surface-to-air missile for the S-300P.

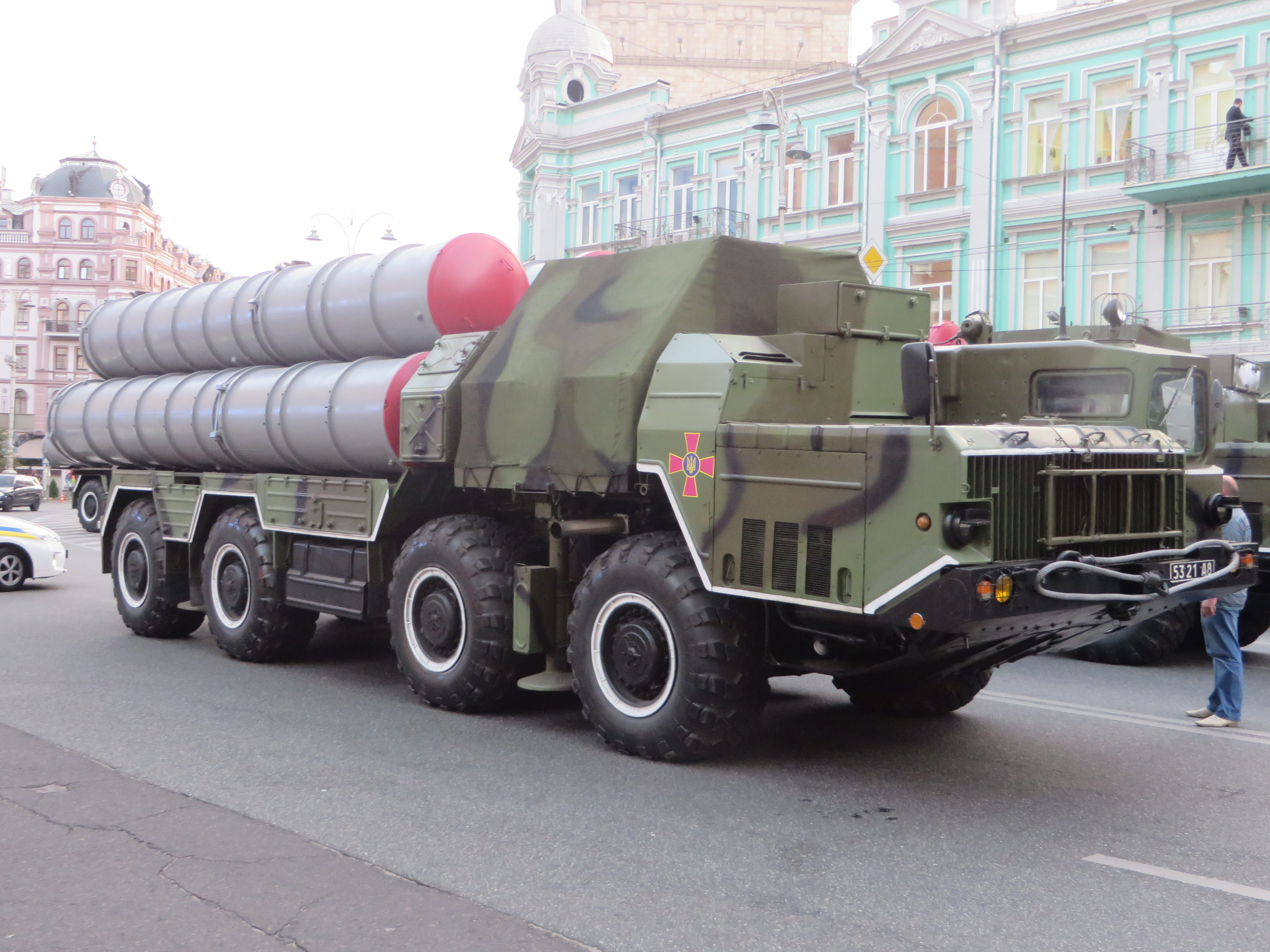
Ukrainian S-300 launcher in Kyiv, Ukraine.

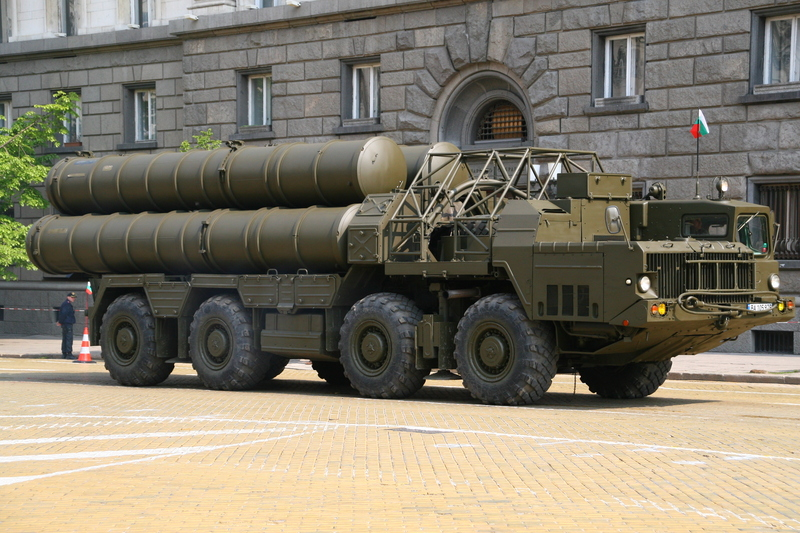
S-300P system operated by the Bulgarian military.

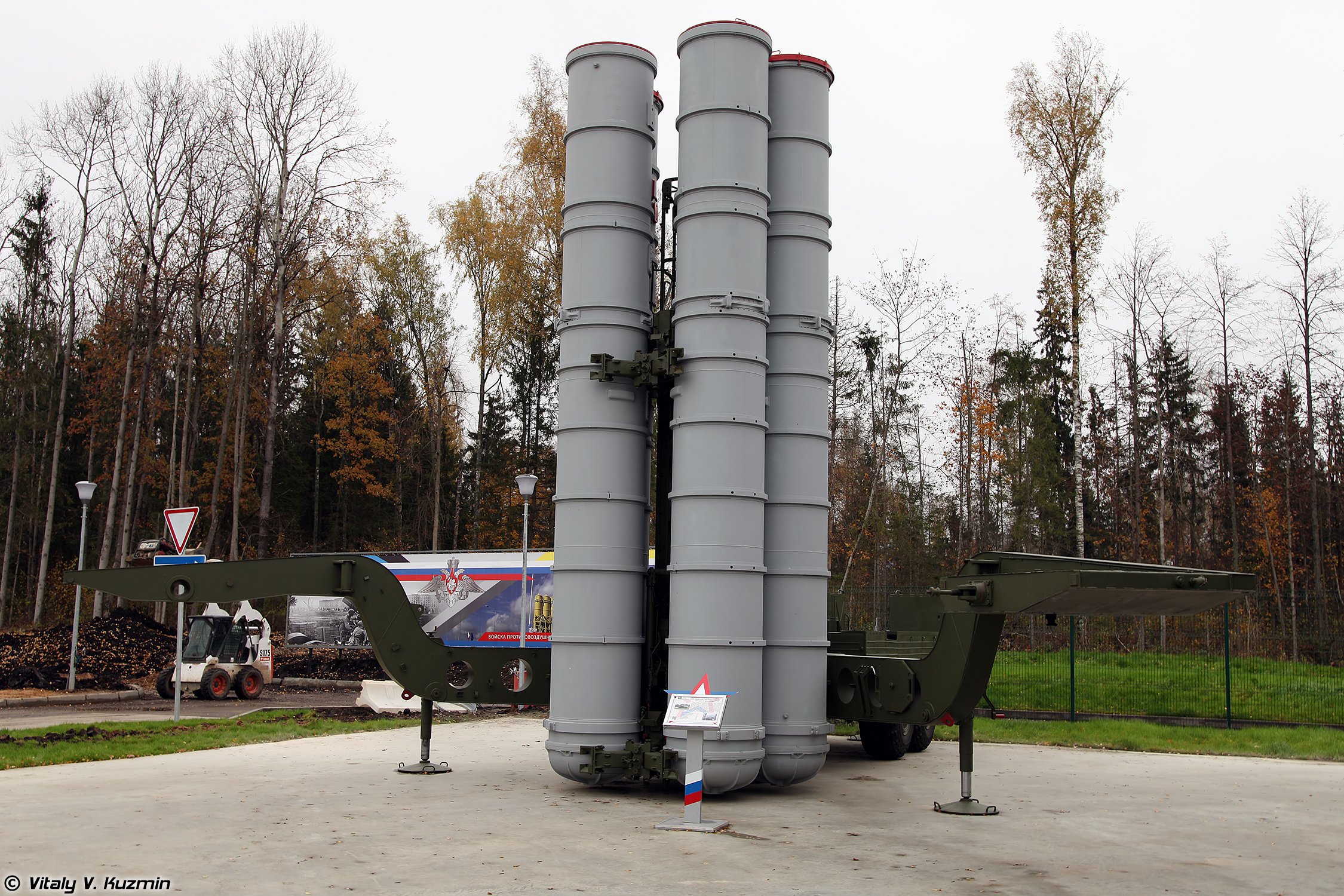
5P85-1 launcher for the S-300PT.

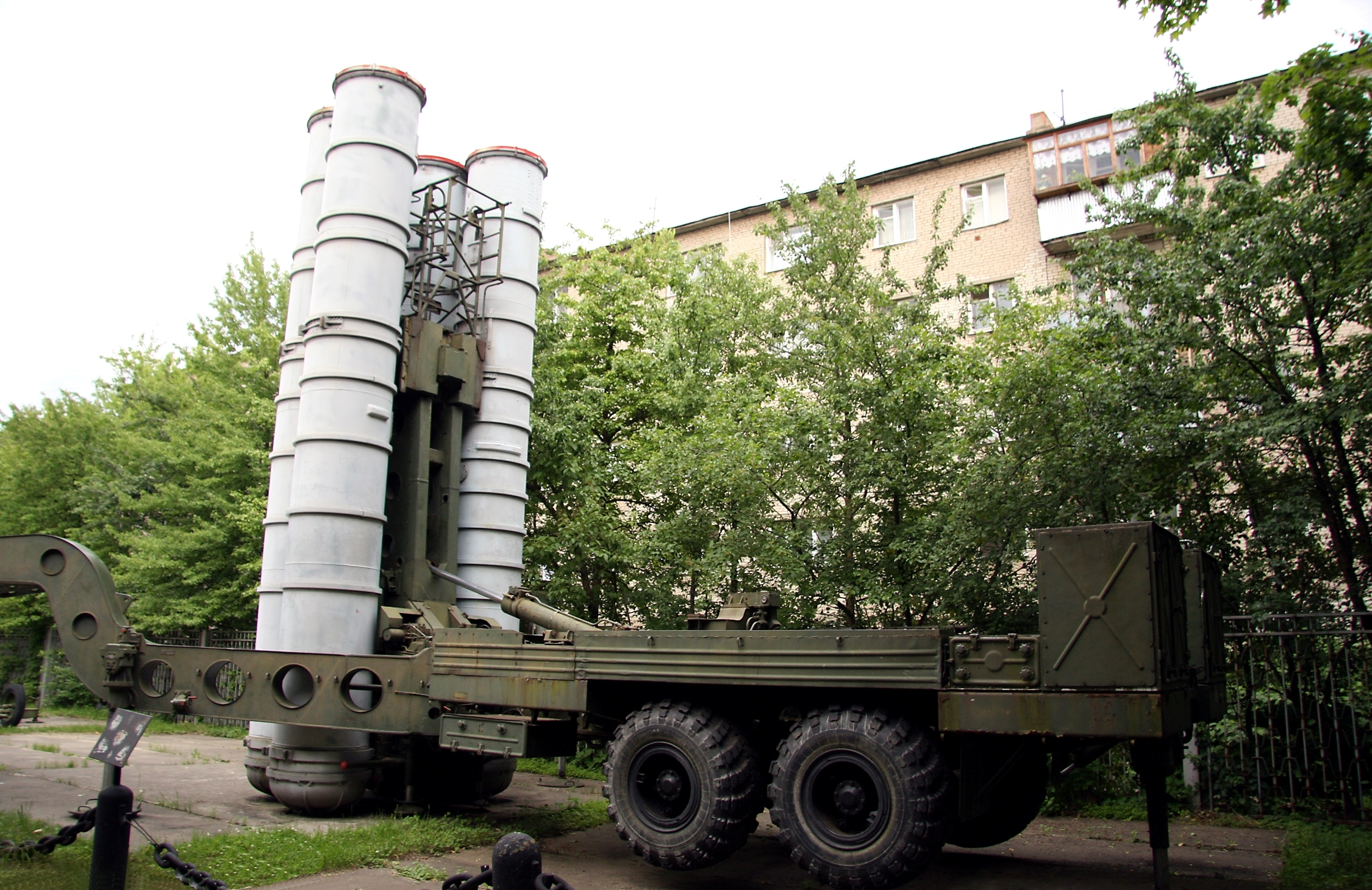
The 5P85-1 launcher for S-300PT displayed at the Air Defense History Museum in Zarya.

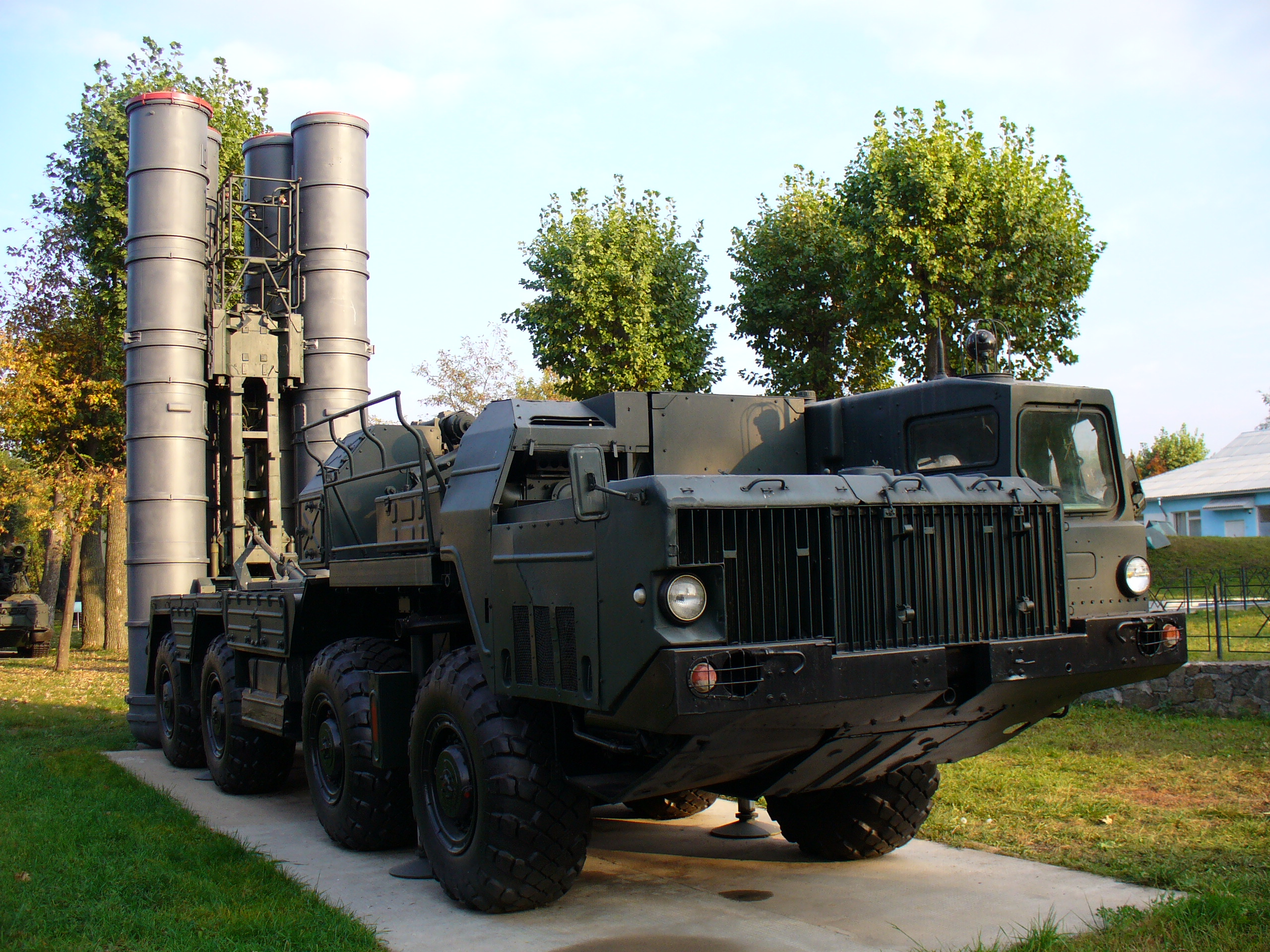
S-300PS surface-to-air missile launcher at a Ukrainian Air Force Museum in Vinnitsa.

S-300PMU2

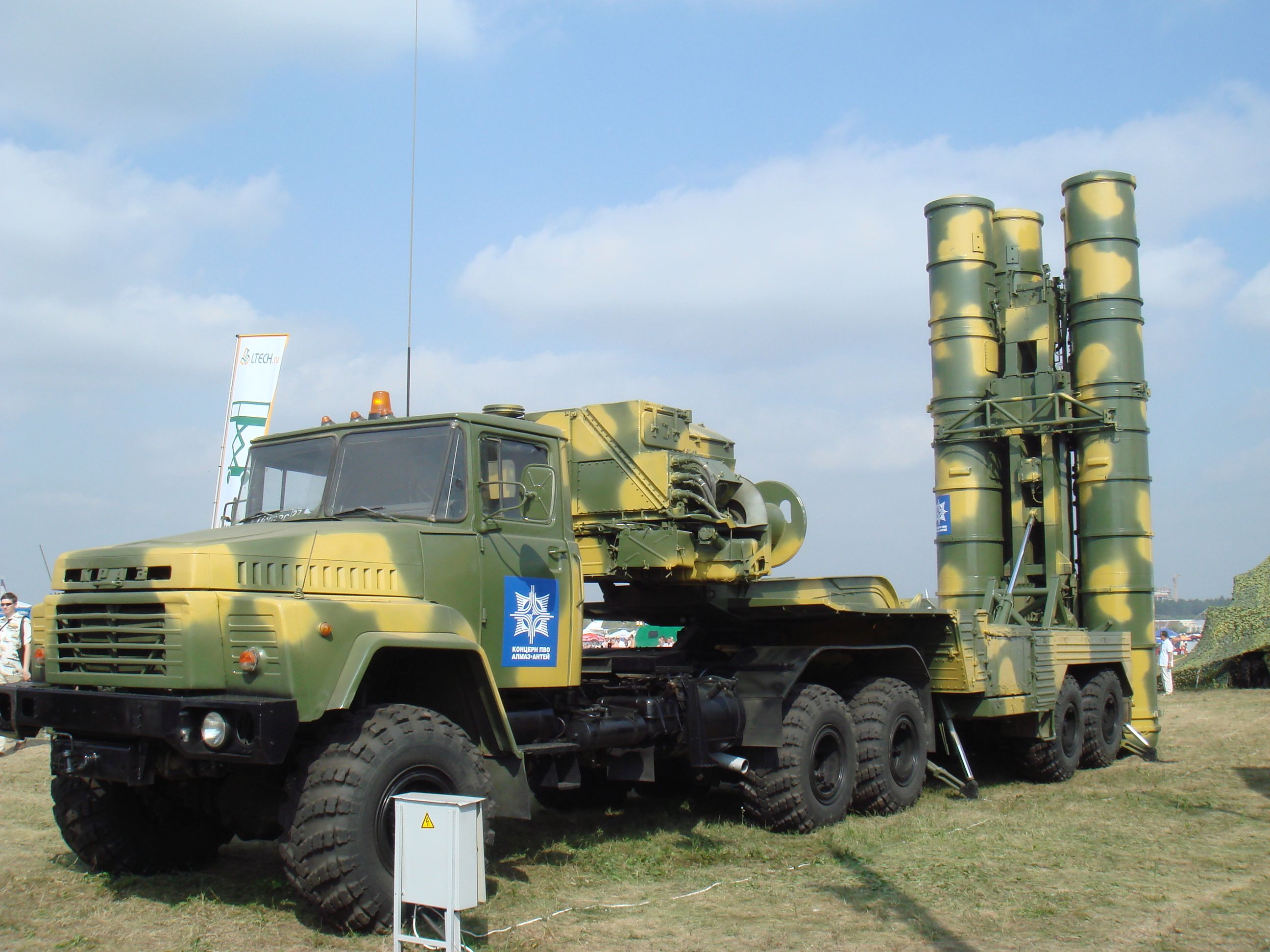
KrAZ-260 tractor-trailer of an S-300PMU2 SAM system.

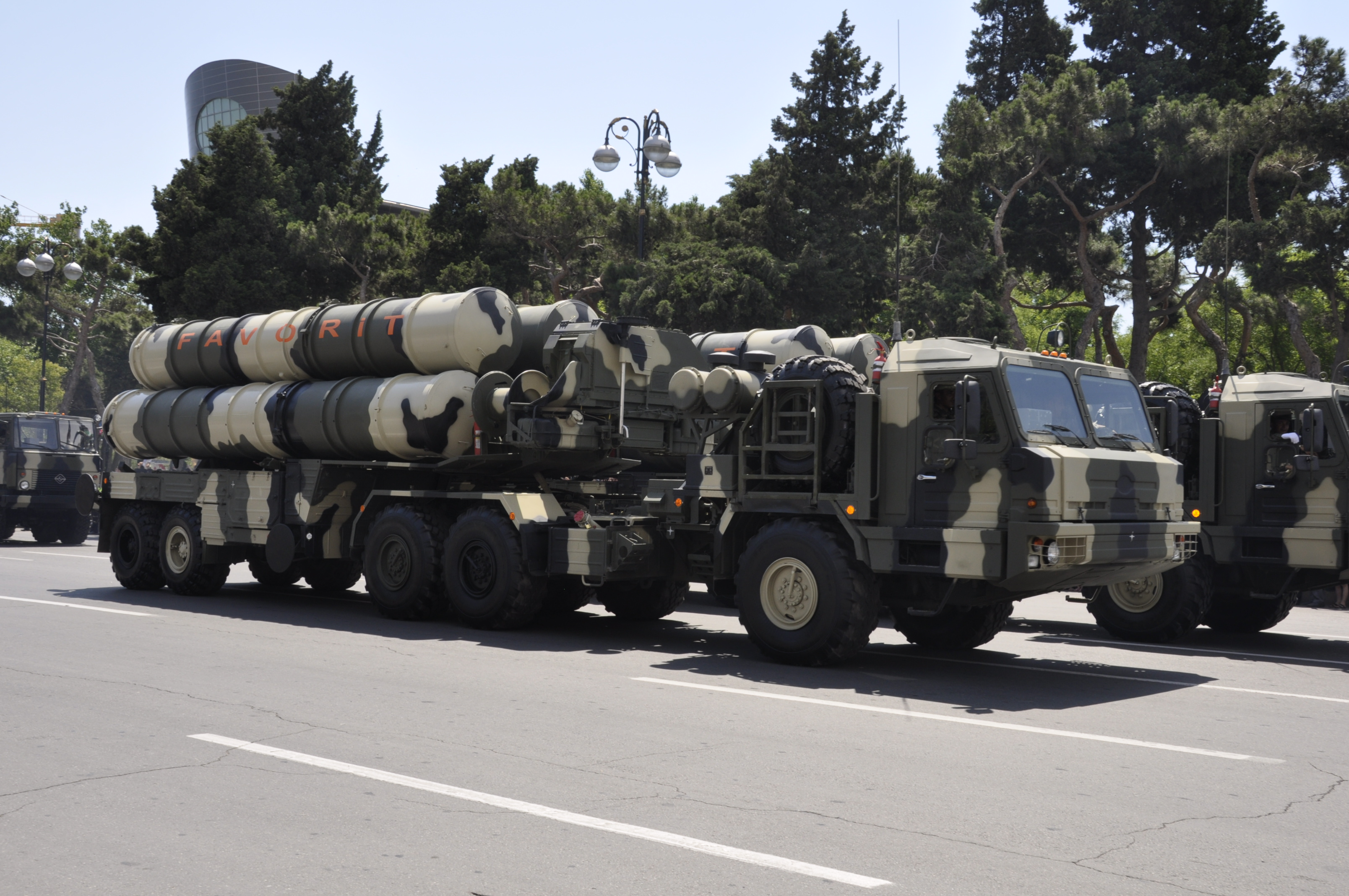
The 5P85TE2 of an S-300PMU2 SAM on parade in Baku in 2011.

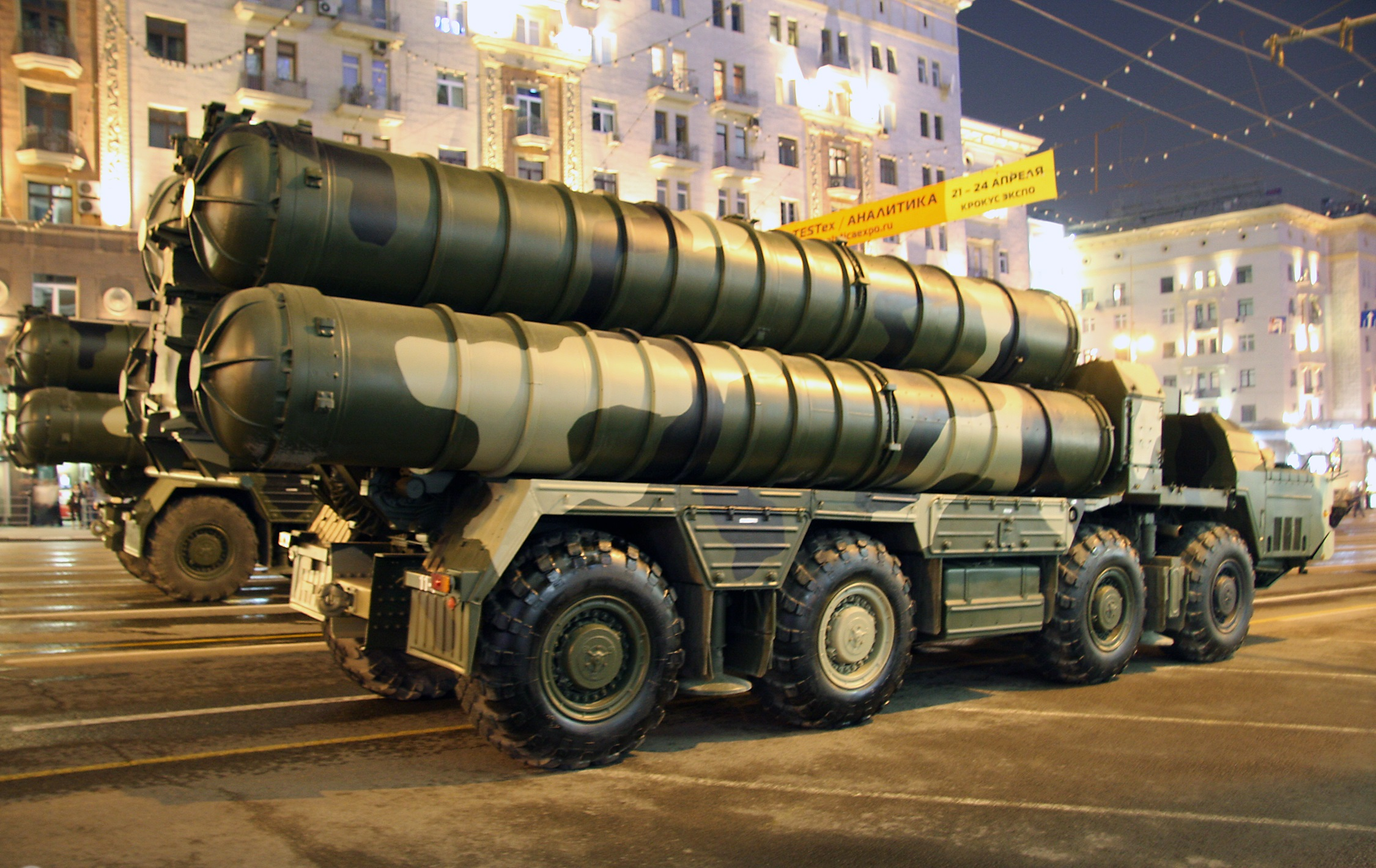
S-300PMU2 during rehearsal for the 2009 Victory Day parade.

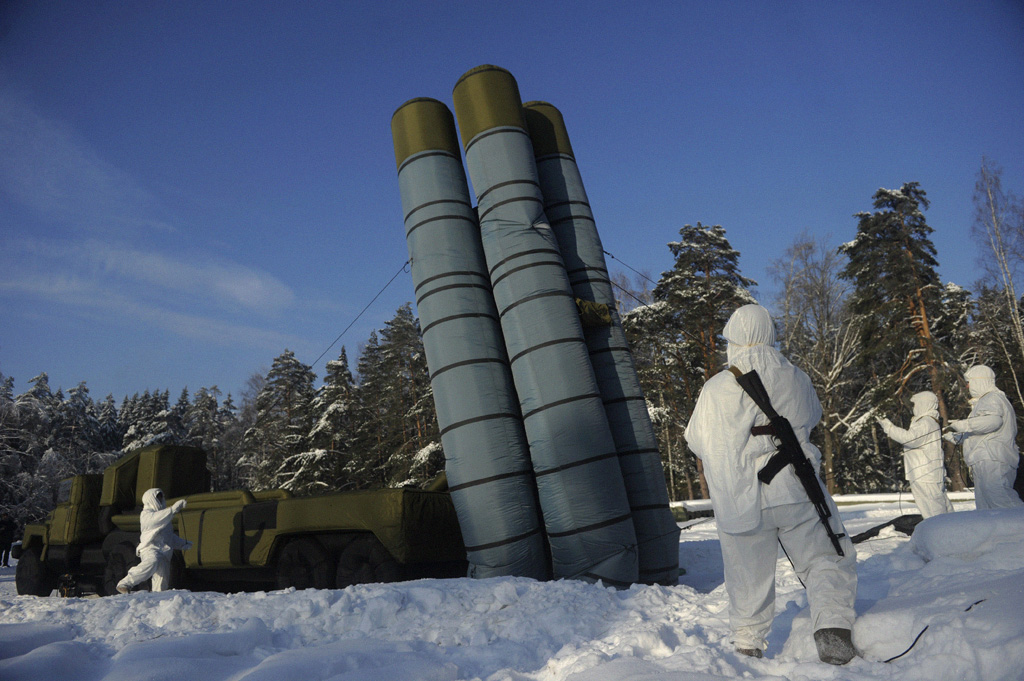
Installing inflatable decoys of the S-300S-300PMU2 during a Russian army exercise by the Guards Engineer Brigade and the Engineer Camouflage Regiment.
