= Syria missile strikes =

Syria missile strikes may refer to:

- Syria missile strikes (September 2018)
- Syria missile strikes (August 2019)
- Syria missile strikes (November 2019)
- Syria missile strikes (January 2021)
