= 2024 Masyaf raid =

2024 Israeli airstrikes and raid in Syria

- Part of the Israel–Hezbollah conflict (2023–2024), the Iran–Israel conflict during the Syrian civil war and the Middle Eastern crisis (2023–present)
- Type: Raid, airstrikes
- Location: Masyaf, Syria; 35°02′39″N 36°19′17″E
- Target: Underground Iranian missile manufacturing plant in Syria
- Date: 8 September 2024
- Executed by: Israeli Air Force: Unit 5101 "Shaldag"
- Outcome: Successful destruction of the plant
- Casualties: 18–27 (including 6 civilians) killed 32–37 injured

On 8 September 2024, in an operation called Operation Many Ways (Hebrew: מבצע רבות הדרכים), Israeli special forces raided an underground missile production facility at a branch of Syria's Scientific Studies and Research Center (SSRC) near Masyaf in the country's northwest. The raid was covered by airstrikes that killed at least eighteen people according to state media. The UK-based Syrian Observatory for Human Rights (SOHR) said that 27 people were killed.

The targeted facility was used by Iran to supply precision-guided missiles to its allies, including the Syrian government and Lebanese Hezbollah. The raid was carried out by commandos from the Israeli Air Force's (IAF) elite Shaldag Unit. In a nearly three-hour operation, the commandos landed at the site by helicopter, where they raided the facility and planted explosives inside. After they left, the explosives were detonated, destroying the facility. The operation is regarded as one of Israel's most complex in its history.

The raid was initially reported by The New York Times and Axios in September 2024, citing Western officials. It was confirmed by Israel in January 2025.

The SOHR and Western intelligence agencies had previously identified the SSRC as responsible for Syrian chemical weapons and missile development programs. The former also claimed that Iranian Revolutionary Guards officers had been stationed at the site for the last six years, which Iranian foreign ministry spokesman Nasser Kanaani refused to confirm or deny. The Israeli operation was reportedly planned as a ground raid after airstrikes over the preceding years had pushed Hezbollah and Iran—involved in a long-running conflict with Israel that has intenfisied amid the Gaza war—to move their operations underground.

== Background ==
Israel has carried out airstrikes in Syria since the beginning of the Syrian civil war in 2011 against weapon shipments to Hezbollah and Iranian forces. Masyaf, west of the city of Hama, was used by Iran-aligned forces as a base and was repeatedly struck by Israel. Israeli airstrikes escalated since the outbreak of the Gaza war in October 2023 in response to attacks on northern Israel mostly by Hezbollah from Lebanon and Syria. At the time of the Masyaf raid, the SOHR reported that over 60 Israeli strikes hit Syria since the beginning of 2024. The strikes destroyed or damaged 140 targets and killed 230 people; 208 fighters and 22 civilians.

== Target ==
=== Israeli account ===
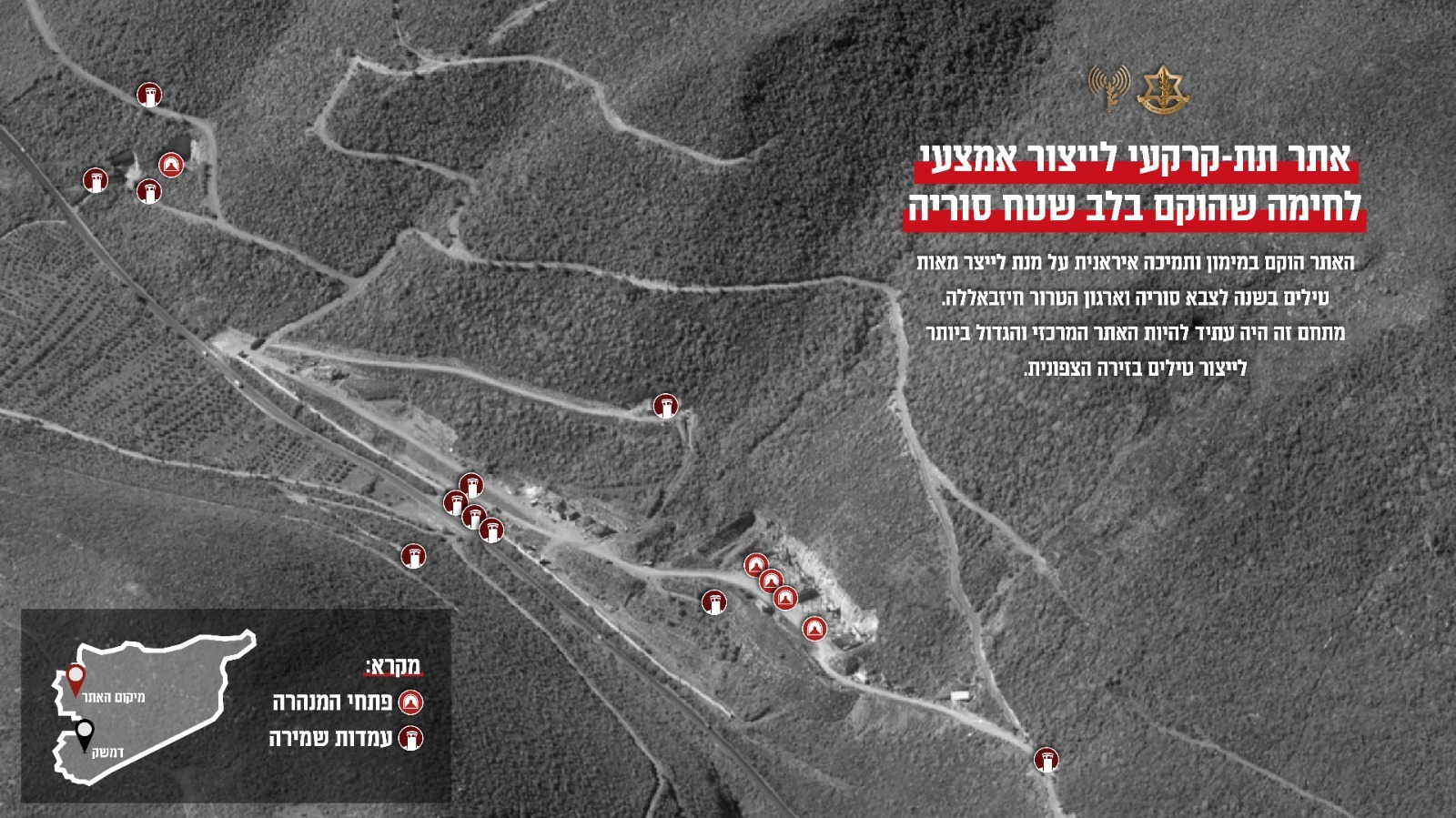
An infographic of the facility released by the IDF in Hebrew. The symbols in the key on the bottom left are labeled from top to bottom: "Tunnel Entrances" and "Guarding Positions".

According to the IDF, the target of the raid, codenamed "Deep Layer", was an underground precision-guided missile facility used by Iran to manufacture weapons for Hezbollah in Lebanon, Bashar al-Assad's forces in Syria, and other Iranian proxies. Located within a mountain at the Syrian Scientific Studies and Research Center (SSRC) in Masyaf, it was over 200 kilometres (120 mi) north of Israel. The area had one of the greatest concentrations of air defenses in Syria, second only to Damascus, at the time of the raid. The facility was 70–130 metres (230–430 ft) underground and shaped as a horseshoe, and its walls were made from reinforced concrete. Its distance underground made it difficult to destroy from the sky. The facility had three entrances in total: an entrance embedded into the mountainside for raw materials, a nearby exit used to ship completed missiles, and an adjacent entrance that provided access to the office section within the facility, which was linked to the manufacturing area. At least 16 rooms were dedicated to missile production, including planetary mixers for rocket fuel, missile body manufacturing, and paint rooms.

According to the IDF, the facility was planned by Iran in 2017, following an Israeli airstrike on SSRC that year that destroyed an above-ground rocket engine site. Many of the weapons in Hezbollah's arsenal were supplied by the facility. Following its destruction, and other Israeli strikes on weapons shipments to Hezbollah, Iran decided to build a facility underground to protect it from Israeli attacks. Iran began digging out the mountain at the SSRC in late 2017, and construction was completed by 2021. The IDF said that it had information on the site as soon as construction began. Following its completion, Iran shipped equipment used for the mass production of missiles to the facility, and later began carrying out tests on the production line. The IDF predicted that the facility would replace Iran's method of delivering missiles and missile parts via truck from its own territory to Lebanon given its proximity to the Lebanese border. These shipments were often targeted by Israel.

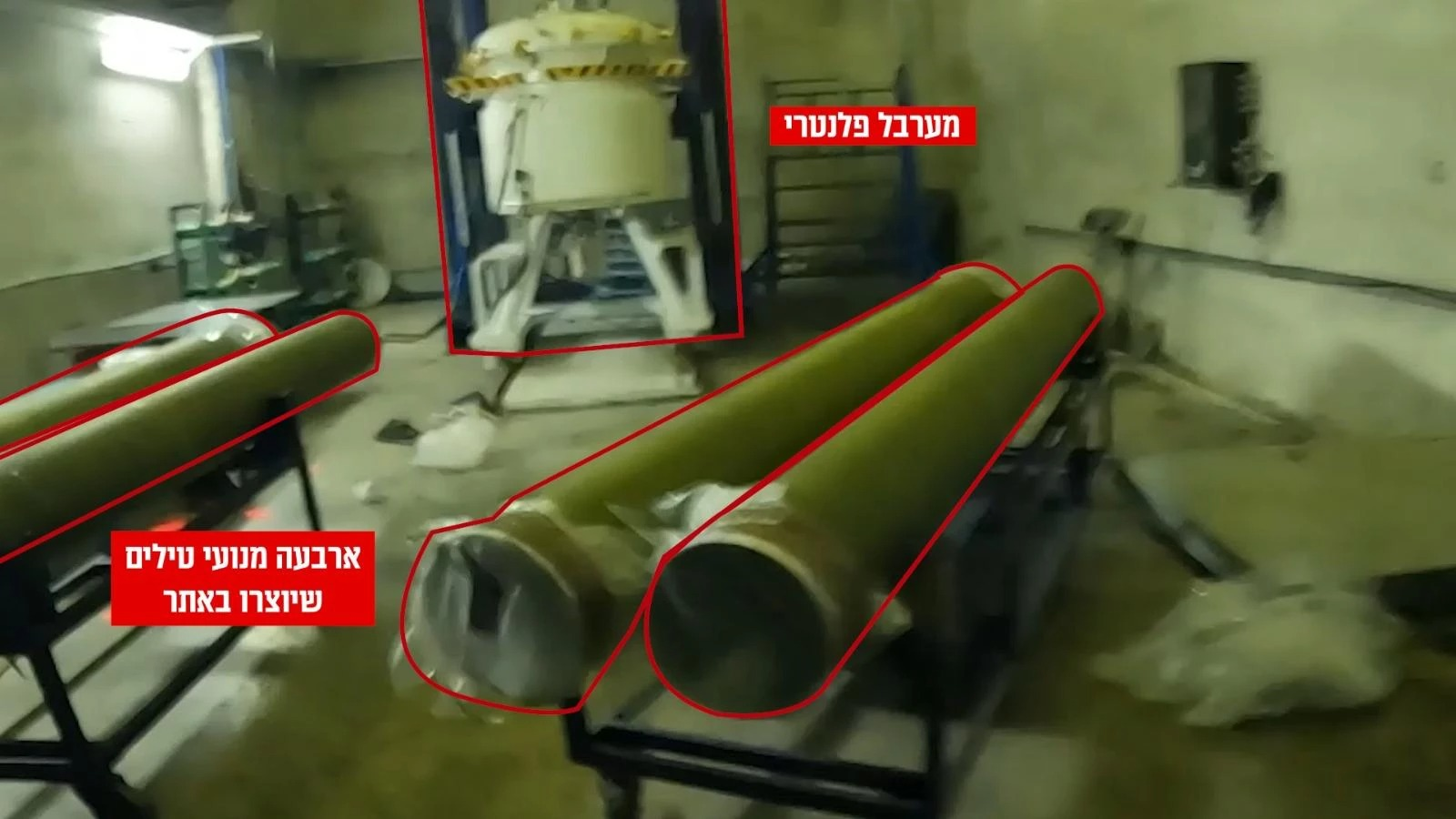
Four missile engines (front) and a planetary mixer (back) inside of the facility.

The IDF said that the facility was not fully active by the time it launched its operation, but had already successfully manufactured at least two missiles and mass-produced rocket engines. An IDF estimate stated that the facility had the potential to produce 100–300 missiles yearly upon completion, ranging from short-range rockets with ranges of 40–70 kilometres (25–43 mi) to rockets with a range of up to 130 kilometres (81 mi).

=== SOHR account ===
The Syrian Observatory for Human Rights (SOHR) reported that the targeted site, known as "Heer Abbas", contained a factory that was supervised and built by Iran's Islamic Revolutionary Guard Corps (IRGC) and used for the manufacturing of medium-range missiles. It was the most prominent of several Iranian short- and medium-range missile production facilities constructed since 2018. These factories were supervised by the IRGC and built in participation with Hezbollah and in cooperation with the Syrian regime. At the time of Israel's operation, the factories recently began developing drones, causing Israel to target Heer Abbas.

== Preparations ==
Israel had contemplated destroying the facility years prior to the raid, but the idea was only seriously considered by senior officials following the outbreak of a multi-front war against Israel that began after the October 7 attacks.

The operation was presented to Israeli Prime Minister Benjamin Netanyahu and then-Defense Minister Yoav Gallant by Lt. Col. B., the Shaldag Unit's commander. It was approved by Chief of the General Staff Herzi Halevi and air force commander Tomer Bar.

The IDF chose the Shaldag Unit to conduct the raid, an elite unit and part of the IAF. The IAF believed that using its own special forces would be more effective than using commandos from the Israeli Ground Forces or Navy, and the unit had sufficient training and capabilities for the operation. Training by Shaldag and Unit 669 began two months prior to the operation with drills representing several scenarios to ensure that a back-up plan would be available in case something went wrong. Israel ramped up intelligence efforts to ensure that the operation went according to plan and that the resources and attention that went into it were not wasted. Israel chose to conduct the raid on 8 September due to several reasons, including because it had ideal weather conditions for the helicopters carrying the soldiers.

== Attack ==
=== Arrival ===
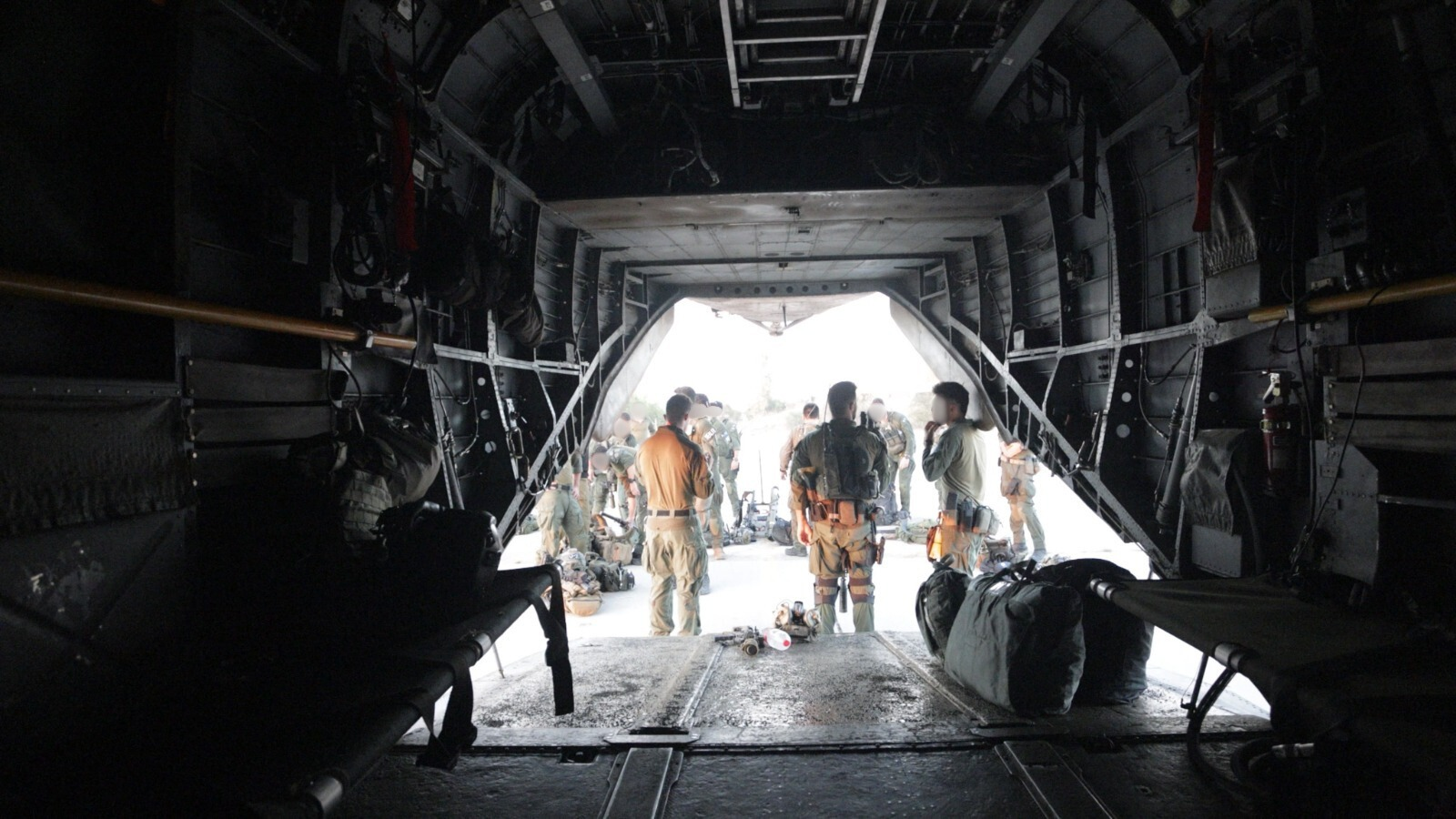
Shaldag fighters before boarding the helicopter at the start of the operation.

On the evening of 8 September, around 100 commandos from Shaldag and 20 others from Unit 669 entered four Sikorsky CH-53 Sea Stallion transport helicopters in an airbase in Israel and took off for Syria. They were joined by two attack helicopters, 21 fighter jets, five unmanned aerial vehicles, and 14 reconnaissance aircraft. Thirty aircraft were also on standby in Israel. The helicopters flew above the Mediterranean Sea, off the Lebanese coast, before entering Syria via its coast, flying low to avoid detection from Syrian radar and air defenses. They also had to avoid Russian air defenses on the coast. The helicopters arrived at the facility after 18 minutes, undetected.

=== Strikes ===
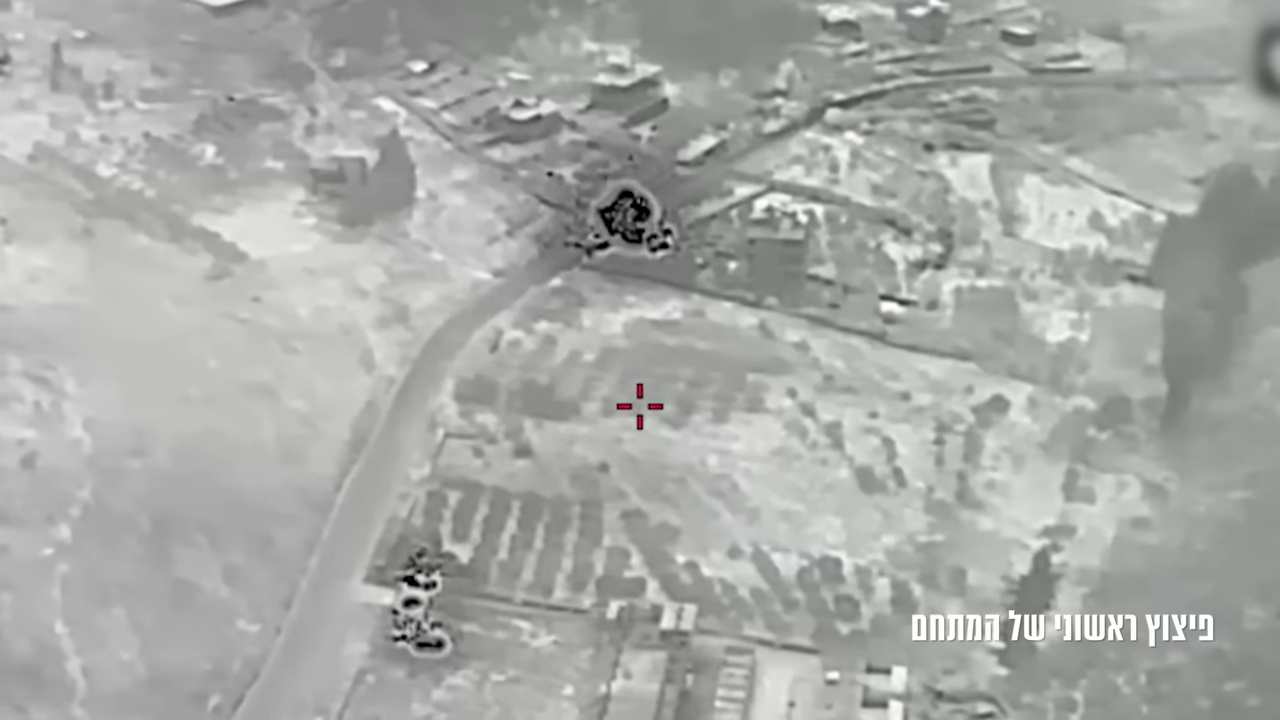
An Israeli airstrike during the operation.

Concurrently with the arrival of the helicopters, Israeli fighter jets, drones, and Navy missile boats carried out a wave of strikes on the SSRC facility and other sites in Syria. They were intended to cover up the raid and trick Syria into thinking it was a frequent attack. Additionally, the strikes intended to lure away Syrian soldiers, dozens of whom approached the site as the raid started. Roads and people attempting to reach the site were also hit. The strikes continued throughout the duration of the raid, and 49 munitions were used in total by the IAF.

The Syrian Arab News Agency reported that strikes targeting several military sites took place around 23:20 (UTC+03:00). It added that some missiles were intercepted by air defenses. According to the Syrian foreign ministry, several residential areas were attacked. Damage to key infrastructure was reported, including an underground fiber-optic cable and a high-voltage power line. The SOHR reported that several structures in the area of the research facility were destroyed on the Masyaf-Wadi al-Oyoun highway and in Hair Abbas, while an Israeli drone was shot down by Syrian defenses in Baniyas. Among the sites targeted were SSRC facility itself, the headquarters of Syria's Military Intelligence Directorate, army posts established to guard the facility, air defense facilities near Al-Bayda, and warehouses. The IDF also targeted all vehicles that approached the facility, including civilian motorcycles. Israeli forces used double tap strikes in Masyaf, where they struck civilian cars and later hit people who attempted to rescue the injured. While cutting off access to roads that led to the facility, Israeli drones targeted a bulldozer that was attempting to open a road following the first wave of strikes, killing its driver.

The Syrian health ministry reported 18 deaths by the airstrikes, and SANA reported that 37 others were injured. The SOHR reported 27 deaths in the strikes: four Syrian soldiers, 14 Syrians working with Iran-backed militias (including five from Hezbollah), three unidentified people, and six civilians. Thirty-two others were injured.

=== Raid ===
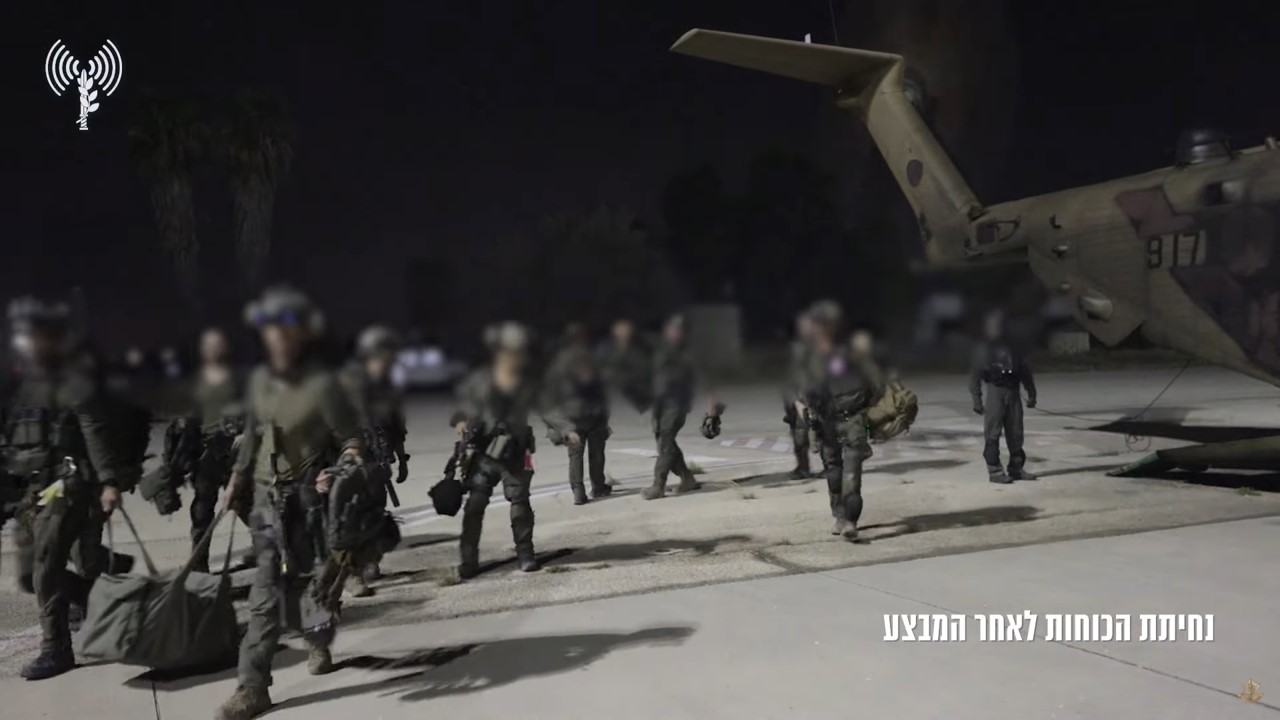
Shaldag fighters during the operation.

A transport helicopter eventually landed close to an entrance and dropped off Shaldag personnel. The two other transport helicopters landed nearby at a location overlooking the facility. The fourth transport helicopter dropped off additional personnel several minutes after the first one landed. All 100 of the Shaldag personnel were dropped off, while the Unit 669 commandos stayed in the helicopters. They brought along medical equipment and were meant to join the operation in case any of the Shaldag commandos were injured. The helicopters subsequently flew to another location and waited two-and-a-half hours for the operation to be completed.

The first group of commandos secured the area while the second approached the entrance, killing two soldiers. Another team, positioned on a nearby hill, operated a small drone to monitor the raid and kill people approaching the facility. According to the IDF, the facility had fewer guards at nighttime than when it was active, and nobody was inside during the raid. The Syrian military would lock the entrances and guard the area at night. The entrances were sealed by heavy duty doors, which were difficult to break through. Fifty minutes into the operation, the soldiers were successfully able to breach the entrance used to reach the office section. After entering the facility, the soldiers used forklifts already present inside to open the other two entrances.

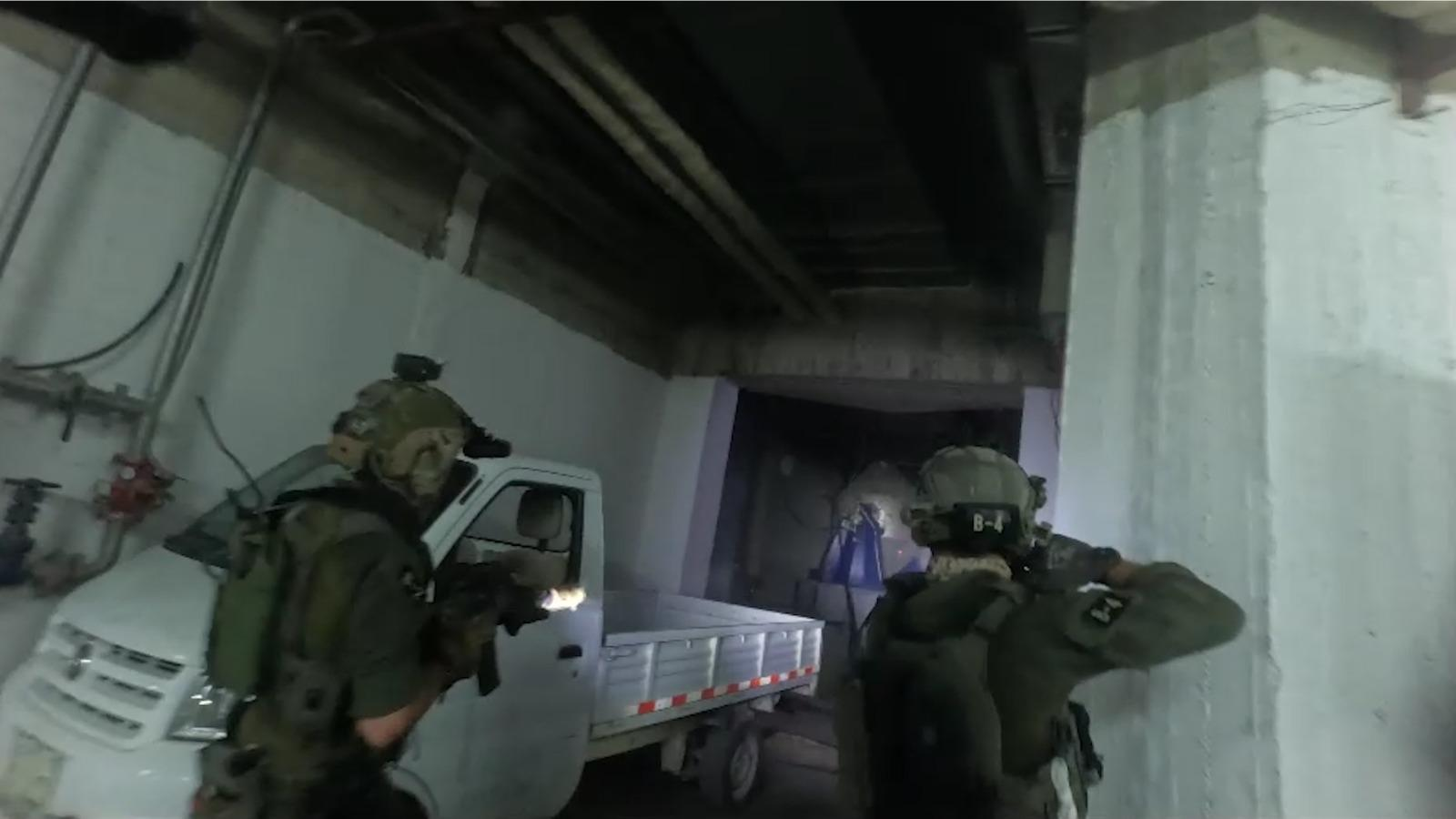
Israeli soldiers inside of the facility during the raid

Another team with explosives and a quad bike concurrently arrived at the entrances. Using the quad bike, the commandos were able to quickly plant explosives throughout the facility. Fifty commandos planted explosives on equipment along the production line, while the other 50 stayed outside to secure the area. About 300 kilograms (660 lb) of explosives were planted and rigged to a remote detonator at the facility's entrance. Soldiers also took intelligence documents from the facility. All 100 commandos subsequently evacuated to the landing spot, where they were picked up by the helicopters. The Shaldag Unit's chief explosives specialist detonated the explosives, causing a blast estimated to be equivalent to one ton of explosives and destroying the facility. Participants in the raid said the blast felt like a "mini earthquake".

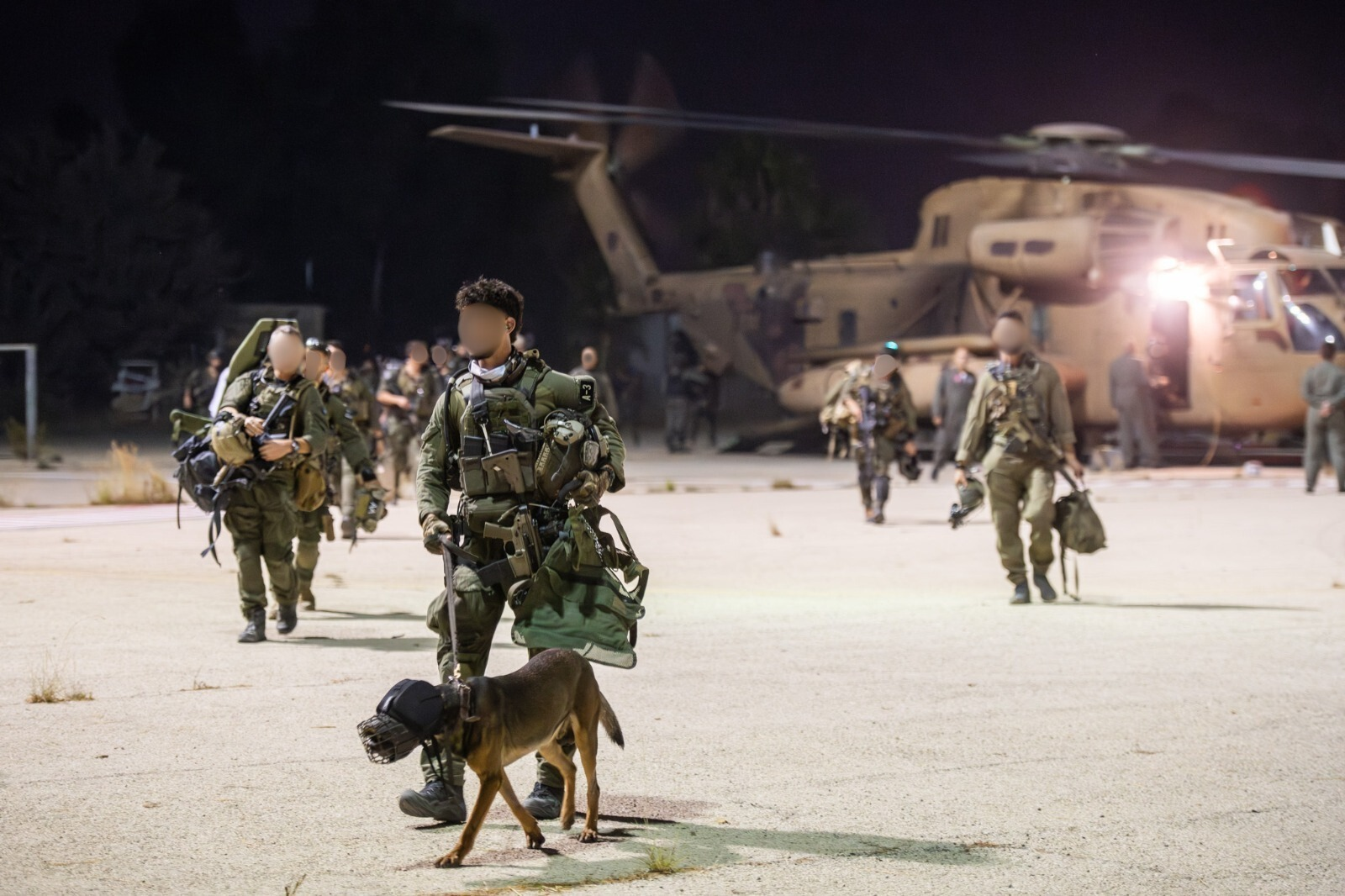
Shaldag soldiers disembark from a helicopter after the raid.

The helicopters moved towards the sea before heading to Israel, leaving behind equipment such as the quad bike. Approximately an hour after the operation ended, hundreds of Syrian soldiers arrived at the facility. The IDF estimated that around 30 Syrian soldiers were killed in the operation, while no Israeli casualties occurred.

== See also ==
- Israeli invasion of Syria (2024–present)
- 2024 Palmyra airstrike
- January 2013 Rif Dimashq airstrike
- November 2024 Batroun raid, an Israeli commando raid in northern Lebanon.
