= Damascus airstrikes =

Damascus airstrikes may refer to:

- July 2022 Damascus airstrikes
- September 2022 Damascus airstrikes
- 2023 Damascus airstrike
