= Israel and the Syrian civil war =

Israel has occasionally intervened in the Syrian civil war since it began in March 2011, with Israeli airstrikes targeting Iranian and Hezbollah forces. After the fall of the Assad regime on December 8, 2024, Israel invaded Syria.

From 2011 to 2017, the official position of Israel has been that of strict neutrality. However, due to the Iranian intervention in the conflict, which began in 2013, it has become involved both politically and militarily in attempts to prevent the growing influence and entrenchment of Iranian troops and proxies throughout Syria. Dubbed Operation Chess, Israeli military activity in Syria has primarily been limited to aerial and missile strikes targeting facilities used by Iran and its proxy forces, especially Hezbollah, which entered Syria from Lebanon shortly after the outbreak of the conflict. Before 2017, Israel did not officially acknowledge any of its operations within Syria, many of which have consisted of airstrikes to disrupt weapons shipments to Hezbollah personnel.

By August 2022, the British investigative non-profit organization Airwars estimated that 17 to 45 civilians were killed and another 42 to 101 civilians were wounded by Israeli airstrikes in Syria since 2013; Syrian reports place these figures much lower than other foreign actors in the conflict. Between 2013 and September 2018, Israel also provided humanitarian aid to victims of the Syrian civil war, especially following the launch of Operation Good Neighbour in June 2016.

During its December 2024 invasion, Israel took control of the United Nations Disengagement Observer Force (UNDOF) buffer zone in southern Syria.

== Background ==
Israel and Syria have technically been in a state of war since 1948, when both came into being. They have fought each other in three major wars: the 1948 Arab Israeli War, the 1967 Six-Day War, and the 1973 Yom Kippur War. Since 1974 there has been a ceasefire arrangement between the two countries, along the so-called Purple Line, which has largely been adhered to by both countries, though not by Hezbollah. However, both countries have been involved in the 1982 Lebanon War and the Lebanese Civil War.

A number of incidents took place on the Purple Line in the initial phase of the Syrian Civil War, straining Israel–Syria relations, including the Quneitra Governorate clashes, incidents between the Syrian Army and Syrian rebels on the Syrian-controlled side of the Golan and the Golan Neutral Zone, and Hezbollah involvement in the Syrian Civil War. Through the incidents, which began in late 2012, as of mid-2014, one Israeli civilian was allegedly killed and at least four soldiers wounded; on the Syrian-controlled side, it was estimated that at least two unidentified militants, who had attempted to cross into the Israeli-controlled side of the Golan Heights, had been killed.

== Israeli position ==
=== Neutrality ===
Israel's official position in the Syrian Civil War has been strict neutrality, as per various Israeli Defense Ministers.

In July 2017, Israel's Defence Minister, Avigdor Liberman, said that while "the rebels are not our friends, they are all versions of al-Qaeda", Israel could not allow a man like Bashar al-Assad to remain in power: "Keeping Assad in power is not in our security interests. As long as he is in power, Iran and Hezbollah will be in Syria." He said that Israel had no interest in entering the Syrian civil war, but there were ″red lines″ Israel had set, such as the smuggling of sophisticated weaponry to Hezbollah and Iran's presence on its borders. Later in July 2017, the Israeli government said it opposed the cease-fire agreement in southern Syria that the United States, Russia, and Jordan had reached a week prior that envisaged establishing de-escalation zones along Syria's borders with both Jordan and Israel, as that would legalise Iran's presence in Syria.

In October 2017, Lieberman conceded that Assad was winning the war and was now being courted by foreign powers, which he said was ″unprecedented″. The statement was said to have "marked a reversal for Israel, where top officials had from the outset of fighting in 2011 until mid-2015 regularly predicted Assad would lose control of his country and be toppled". He called for the U.S. to be more active ″in the Syrian arena and in the Middle East in general″ and noted that Israel was struggling to deal with the "Russians, Iranians, and also the Turks and Hezbollah."

=== Opposition to Iranian presence in Syria ===
On 9 July 2017, a new ceasefire agreement was directly brokered by the United States and Russia for southwest Syria. The United States and Russia had made a number of attempts in the past to reach an agreement for establishing a ceasefire in different parts of Syria. However, the earlier ceasefire attempts failed to reduce violence for long. US President Donald Trump and Russian President Vladimir Putin reached the agreement during their meeting at the Group of 20 summit in Hamburg, Germany, on 7 July 2017. It affects towns, villages and borderlands in three regions close to Jordan and Israel. The deal includes establishing de-escalation zones, otherwise known as safe zones, along Syria's borders with both Jordan and Israel.

The Israeli government opposed the ceasefire agreement, as it claimed that its security interests were not reflected in the draft ceasefire agreement being formulated. "It doesn't take almost any of Israel's security interests and it creates a disturbing reality in southern Syria. The agreement doesn't include a single explicit word about Iran, Hezbollah or the Shi’ite militias in Syria.” Israel reportedly held secret talks with Russia and the United States over the ceasefire agreement. The Israeli government stressed its desire to remove Iranian forces from Syria. However, it was disappointed, as it argued that the agreement "contradicted virtually all the positions Israel had presented to the Americans and Russians."

The Israeli government's main concern with regard to the ceasefire agreement was that it believed that Iranian influence in the region would increase. Israeli Prime Minister Benjamin Netanyahu met Putin in August 2017 to share Israel's concerns on the ceasefire agreement. "Mr. President, with joint efforts we are defeating Islamic State, and this is a very important thing. But the bad thing is, that where the defeated Islamic State group vanishes, Iran is stepping in," he told Putin. The Russian government told its Israeli counterpart that it will deter Iran or Hezbollah from opening a new front with Israel. "We take the Israeli interests in Syria into account," Alexander Petrovich Shein, Russia's ambassador to Israel, told its Channel One television on Tuesday. "Were it up to Russia, the foreign forces would not stay", he added. A delegation, led by Mossad chief Yossi Cohen, visited Washington for talks with senior White House and Pentagon officials. One of the main issues for the discussion was the ceasefire agreement in southern Syria and its ramifications. "A senior Israeli official said the delegation was expected to try to persuade senior administration officials that parts of the cease-fire agreement in southern Syria should be amended to include clearer statements about the need to remove Iranian forces, Hezbollah and Shi'ite militias out of Syria". However, the high-level delegation was unable to "secure a commitment from the Americans to ensure any agreement to end the war in Syria would include the evacuation of Iranian military forces from the country".

Following the exchange of fire on 10 May 2018, Israeli defense minister Avigdor Lieberman said that Israel won't allow Iran to turn Syria into a "forward base" against Israel.

=== Israeli humanitarian aid to Syrian victims of war ===
In June 2016, the Israeli military began Operation Good Neighbor, a multi-faceted humanitarian relief operation to prevent starvation of Syrians who live along the border and provide basic or advanced medical treatment.

The aid consisted of medical care, water, electricity, education or food and was given to Syrians near the ceasefire line between Israel and Syria, often escorted across by Israeli soldiers. Over 200,000 Syrians received such aid, and more than 4,000 of them were treated in Israeli hospitals from 2013 to September 2018. Many of the treated victims were civilians, often children. Allegations have been made that some were rebel fighters from the Free Syrian Army. This theory is supported by the claim that Israel had a strategic interest in aiding the rebels; they fought against both ISIL and Iranian-allied forces.

== Israeli–Syrian ceasefire line incidents ==
Several incidents have taken place on the Israeli–Syrian ceasefire line during the Syrian Civil War, straining the relations between the countries. The incidents are considered a spillover of the Quneitra Governorate clashes since 2012 and later incidents between Syrian Army and the rebels, in the Syrian-controlled side of the Golan and the Golan Neutral Zone and the Hezbollah involvement in the Syrian Civil War. Through the incidents, which began in late 2012, as of mid-2014, one Israeli civilian was killed and at least 4 soldiers wounded; on the Syrian-controlled side, it is estimated that at least ten soldiers were killed, as well as two unidentified militants, who were identified near Ein Zivan on Golan Heights.

== Iran–Israel proxy conflict in Syria ==
On several occasions, Israel reportedly carried out or supported attacks on Hezbollah and Iranian targets within Syrian territories or Lebanon. One of the first reliably reported incident of this kind took place on 30 January 2013, when Israeli aircraft struck a Syrian convoy allegedly transporting Iranian weapons to Hezbollah. Habitually, Israel refused to comment on the incident, a stance that is believed to seek to ensure that the Syrian government did not feel obliged to retaliate.

More incidents were attributed to IAF in May 2013, December 2014, April 2015. Some of those reports were confirmed by Syria, whereas others were denied. Israel has consistently refused to comment on alleged targeting of Hezbollah and Syrian targets in Syrian territory. In 2015, suspected Hezbollah militants launched a retaliatory attack on Israeli forces in Shebaa farms. In March 2017, Syria launched anti-aircraft missiles towards the Israeli-controlled part of the Golan Heights, allegedly targeting Israeli IAF aircraft, which Syria claimed were on their way to attack targets in Palmyra (Syria). After the incident, Israel stated it was targeting weapons shipments headed toward anti-Israeli forces, specifically Hezbollah. Israel denied Syria's claim that one jet fighter was shot down and another damaged. Israel has not reported any pilots or aircraft missing in Syria, or anywhere else in the Middle East following the incident. According to some sources, the incident was the first time Israeli officials confirmed an Israeli strike on a Hezbollah convoy during the Syrian Civil War. As of September 2017, this was the only time such confirmation was issued.

By early December 2017, the Israeli air force had confirmed it had attacked arms convoys of Ba'athist Syria and Lebanon's Hezbollah nearly 100 times over six years of the conflict in Syria.

On 13 January 2021, at least 10 airstrikes hit the mountains around Deir ez-Zor city killing 26 people, 14 Syrian soldiers and 12 Iranian soldiers. Six airstrikes hit weapons warehouses and ammunition depots in Al-Bokamal desert killing 16 militiamen. Two airstrikes targeted warehouses in Al-Mayadeen desert killing 15 militia men. In total 18 airstrikes across Deir ez-Zor Governorate killed 57 in what was the highest death toll since Israel started its attacks on Syria.

== See also ==
- Turkish involvement in the Syrian civil war
- Lebanon's role in the Syrian civil war
