= 2023 United States airstrikes in Syria =

US military strike

2023 US strikes in Syria
- Part of Syrian Civil War
- Map of Syria
Date	25 March, 26 October, 8 November, 12 November 2023
Location	Syria

Belligerents
United States	Iranian-backed militias (alleged)

Commanders and leaders
Joe Biden; Lloyd Austin	Unknown

Strength
Unknown number of warplanes About 900 troops in northeastern Syria	Unknown

Casualties and losses
3 killed 49 wounded	None reported

The United States conducted several air strikes on targets in Syria in 2023.

On 25 March 2023, the U.S. military struck facilities used by groups affiliated with Iran's Islamic Revolutionary Guard Corps (IRGC) in Syria in response to a drone attack that killed a US contractor in northeastern Syria on 23 March 2023.

On 26 October, two U.S. jets struck two IRGC sites in Syria. U.S. officials said this was in response to attacks against U.S. troops in Iraq and Syria.

On 8 November, two U.S. jets struck a facility for storing weapons in eastern Syria; U.S. officials said the strike was a response to attacks against U.S. troops in Iraq and Syria by the IRGC-Quds Force and related groups.

On 12 November, U.S. aircraft struck two more sites in Syria in response to attacks on U.S. forces.

== March strikes ==
On March 23, 2023, at 1:38 p.m. Local time (UTC+03:00), a kamikaze drone, allegedly of Iranian origin, attacked a coalition base at Abu Hajr airfield near Ramlan, al-Hasakah province in northeastern Syria. As a result, it killed an American contractor and injured five soldiers and a second contractor.

On 25 March 2023, President Joe Biden authorized and Defense Secretary Lloyd Austin ordered retaliatory strikes to protect U.S. personnel in the region. Their objective was to show that the U.S. would respond quickly and decisively if its personnel were threatened. The strikes were designed to be proportional and minimize the risk of escalation and casualties.

On 8 November, two U.S. jets struck a weapons storage facility in eastern Syria in what U.S. officials called a response to attacks against U.S. troops in Iraq and Syria by the IRGC-Quds Force and related groups.

=== Response and criticism ===
In response to the initial U.S. strikes, Iran-backed militias launched rocket attacks on American and coalition forces, leading to more strikes by coalition warplanes. The death toll from the U.S. strikes rose to 19, with three Syrian regime soldiers and 16 members of Iran-backed forces, including 11 Syrian nationals, killed.

Iran and Syria condemned the U.S. attacks and accused the U.S. of violating international law and Syrian sovereignty. Iran claimed that the U.S. presence in Syria was an excuse to continue its occupation and loot Syria's national wealth, including its energy resources and wheat. The Syrian foreign ministry criticized the "brutal" attacks that it deemed a violation of its territorial integrity and vowed to "end the American occupation."

=== Aftermath ===
Militias affiliated with Iran's Revolutionary Guards have a heavy presence across Syria, particularly around the border with Iraq and south of the Euphrates in Deir Ezzor province, where the U.S. strikes took place. The United States has around 900 troops in northeastern Syria to keep pressure on the remnants of the militant Islamic State group and support the Kurdish-led Syrian Democratic Forces. The aftermath of the U.S. strikes led to a "cautious calm" in the Deir Ezzor area.

== November strikes ==
On 8 November 2023, two U.S. Air Force F-15E jets struck a storage facility for weapons in eastern Syria; U.S. Defense Secretary Lloyd Austin said it was a response "to a series of attacks against U.S. personnel in Iraq and Syria by the [Iranian Islamic Revolutionary Guard Corps]-Quds Force" and related groups.

Austin said, "We are responding to a number of attacks against our forces and these are defensive strikes...They are not connected to what Israel is doing in its efforts against Hamas. So, in terms of deterrence overall, our goal is to make sure that the conflict that's in Gaza doesn't expand and become a region-wide conflict. To this point, we don't think that that's happened. We are going to do everything in our power to make sure that it doesn't happen. If the attacks against our forces don't decrease or stop, we will take additional measures...I think we're going to do everything we can to protect our troops. And we are absolutely serious about that."

On 12 November, U.S. military aircraft struck two facilities in eastern Syria; U.S. officials said they were a training facility and safe house near the cities of Abu Kamal and Mayadin.

== See also ==
- 2023 Israel strikes in Syria
