= 2024 Palmyra airstrike =

Airstrike by Israeli Air Force in Syria

- Part of the Middle Eastern crisis (2023–present) and the Iran–Israel proxy conflict
- Type: Airstrikes
- Location: Palmyra, Syria; 34°35′5″N 38°16′5″E
- Target: Syrian Arab Army; Hezbollah; Harakat al-Nujaba
- Date: 20 November 2024
- Executed by: Israeli Air Force
- Casualties: 108+ killed 50+ injured
- Location within Syria

On 20 November 2024, the Israeli Air Force conducted an airstrike on residential buildings and an industrial area in Palmyra in central Syria. According to the Syrian Observatory for Human Rights, the strikes killed at least 108 people, including 73 Iranian-backed Syrian militiamen and 29 foreign Iranian-backed militiamen, mostly members of the Harakat Hezbollah al-Nujaba of Iraq, as well as 15 Hezbollah militants. The strikes also injured more than 50 people.

== Background ==
Since the beginning of the Syrian civil war in 2011, Israel has been conducting hundreds of airstrikes in Syria, targeting the Syrian Army and Iran-backed groups in the country. Since the Gaza war started on 7 October 2023, Israel increased its airstrikes on Syria as its hostilities with Hezbollah intensified.

== Airstrikes ==
The Syrian Ministry of Defense reported that the airstrikes, which took place at 1:30 p.m. on 20 November 2024, were launched from the direction of the United States military base in Al-Tanf and caused "significant material damage". The Syrian Observatory for Human Rights also reported that the strikes targeted "a weapons depot near the industrial area" in Palmyra. The United Nations deputy special envoy to Syria told the UN Security Council that the attack was "likely the deadliest Israeli strike in Syria to date".

Syrian state media initially reported that the attacks killed 36 people and wounded at least 50 more, as a result of the strikes on residential buildings and an industrial area in Palmyra. The United Kingdom-based Syrian Observatory for Human Rights however reported that the airstrikes killed more than 108 people. The dead include 73 Iranian-backed Syrian militiamen, including 11 officers working for Hezbollah in Lebanon, and 29 Iranian-backed non-Syrian militiamen, primarily Iraqi fighters of Harakat Hezbollah al-Nujaba. The Israel Defense Forces declined to comment on the airstrike.
