= Timeline of the Syrian civil war (September–December 2018) =

The following is a timeline of the Syrian Civil War from September to December 2018. Information about aggregated casualty counts is found at Casualties of the Syrian Civil War.

== September 2018 ==
=== September 2 ===
- The French Foreign Minister, Jean-Yves Le Drian indicated in radio channel that "Assad won the war, we have to state this. But he hasn't won the peace."

=== September 10 ===
- The Netherlands halts funding of the Syrian opposition and police forces, saying the chances of them winning the war are "extremely limited". Dutch support for the White Helmets is also expected to end in December 2018.

=== September 17 ===
- Russia and Turkey announced a demilitarized zone in Syria's Idlib Governorate and ruled out any military operations.
- Several missiles are launched from the sea by Israeli Air Force at the coastal city of Latakia, some of which are destroyed by air defence systems. A Russian Air Force Ilyushin Il-20 reconnaissance plane with 15 servicemen on board crashes over the Mediterranean Sea during the incident. The plane was shot down by Syrian air defense systems trying to target hostile aircraft.

=== September 29 ===
- After being closed for years, the Nasib Border Crossing, the main crossing for Syrian exports to Jordan and the GCC countries, is officially reopened.

== October 2018 ==
=== October 3 ===
- Israeli defense minister Avigdor Lieberman claims Israel will continue conducting strikes into Syria despite the recent arrival of Russia's S-300 anti-missile system.
- Syrian President Bashar al-Assad told a little-known Kuwaiti newspaper Al-Shahed that Syria had reached a "major understanding" with Arab states after years of hostility over the country's civil war.

=== October 15 ===
- The Quneitra border crossing between the Israeli-controlled Golan Heights and Syria reopens for United Nations Disengagement Observer Force (UNDOF) personnel after four years of closure.

=== October 31 ===
- Turkish forces begin shelling Kurdish positions in the cities of Kobani and Tell Abyad as well as surrounding villages in northern Syria. This escalation forces the Syrian Democratic Forces (SDF) to halt its anti-ISIL offensive in the Middle Euphrates River Valley.

== November 2018 ==
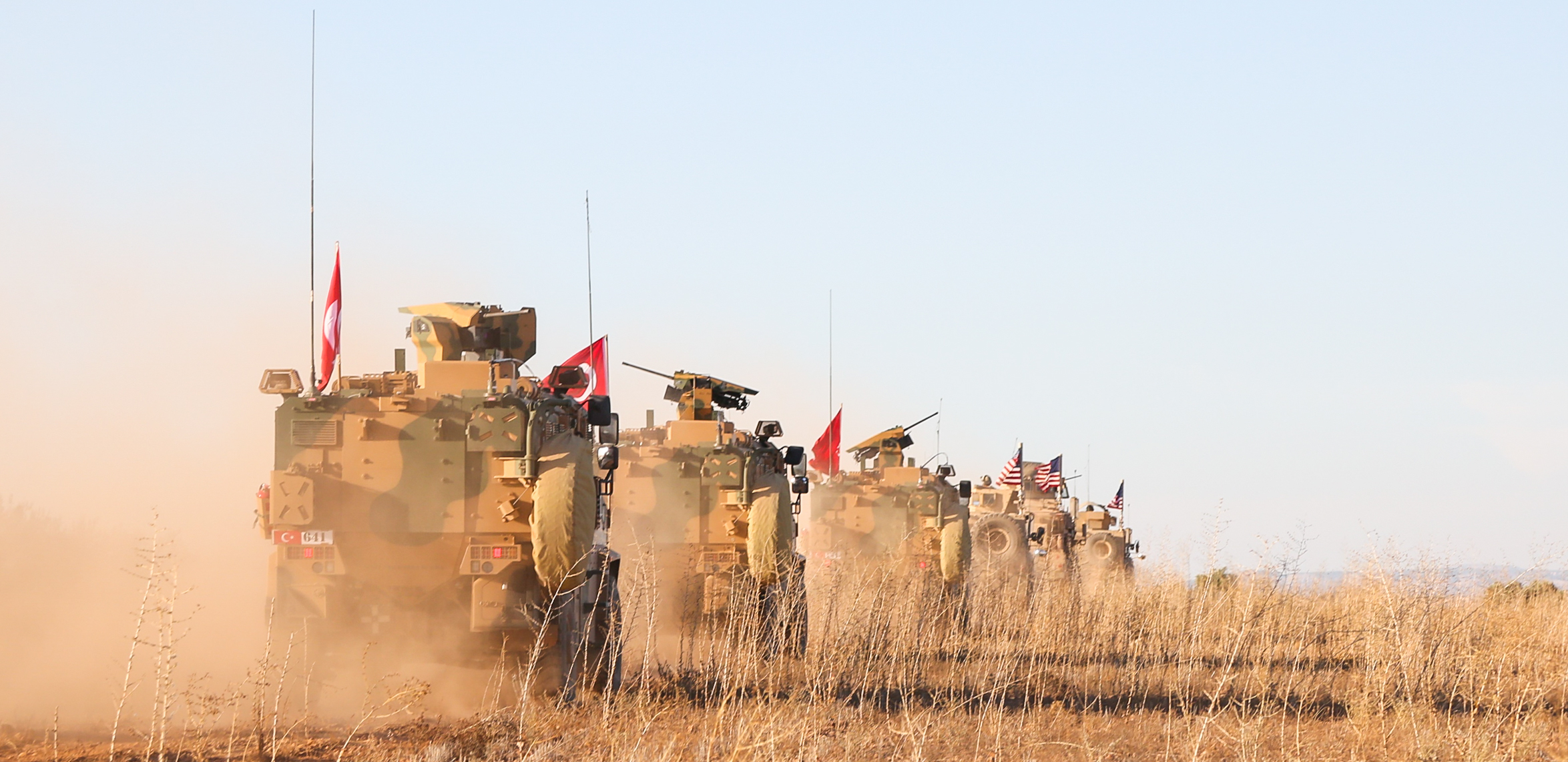
U.S. and Turkish soldiers conduct the first-ever combined joint patrol on November 1, 2018, outside Manbij, Syria

=== November 1 ===
- Turkish and U.S. troops begin joint patrols around Manbij along the front lines of the Euphrates Shield rebel territory and the Manbij Military Council. The joint patrols are seen as part of a "roadmap" for easing tensions between militants in the region and tensions between the two NATO allies.

=== November 19 ===
- The SAA clears the entire Al-Safa volcanic field of ISIL resistance, ending the offensive in the pocket with the Army in full control of all of southern Syria for the first time since 2011 – excluding Al-Tanf in the southeast.

=== November 21 ===
- United States Secretary of Defense Jim Mattis announces the U.S. will set up new observation posts along the Turkish border in northern Syria in order to reduce skirmishes between Turkish forces and armed Kurdish militants in the region such as the October 31 incident. Mattis affirms it is a co-operational endeavor with Turkey and it will not require additional US troops to be deployed to Syria.

=== November 23 ===
- Influential Syrian radio host and anti-Assad activist Raed Fares and his colleague Hammoud al-Juneid are both gunned down by unidentified gunmen in Kafr Nabl in rebel-held Idlib.

=== November 24 ===
- Syrian government officials accuse Idlib-based rebels of a suspected poison gas attack on Aleppo after Syrian state TV aired footage of more than 50 civilians being admitted to a local hospital for breathing problems and blurred vision following alleged shelling. The rebels would deny the attack, claiming to not possess poison gas nor the ability to launch projectiles of it; instead they accused the government of attempting to undermine the ceasefire.
- Turkey says the Syrian government and rebels conducted a 20-man prisoner exchange near al-Bab, calling it the "first important step" of a joint Russia-Iran-Turkey-brokered peace process.

=== November 27 ===
- The US-led Coalition establishes its first observation post along the Syrian-Turkish border in Tal Abyad. Local security sources state that there will be three total posts in Tal Abyad and two in Kobani.

== December 2018 ==
=== December 2 ===
- The US-led Coalition kills senior ISIL member Abu al-Umarayn in a drone strike in the Syrian Desert. Al-Umarayn executed American aid worker and former US Army Ranger Peter Kassig in 2014.

=== December 7 ===
- The US's Federal Aviation Administration extends its no-fly rule over Syrian airspace for commercial and private flights by American air carriers until December 2020.

=== December 11 ===
- The Syrian army general command orders the demobilization of some conscript and reserve officers that have served multiple years during the civil war.
- The Syrian Observatory for Human Rights reported a large number of local civilians and tribesmen from the Khasham and New Akidat area clashed with guards of the US-backed Syrian Democratic Forces (SDF) and managed to capture several oil wells in the Conoco oil field after SDF personnel allegedly avoided supplying fuel to the village of New Akidat and refugee camps in the region while hoarding fuel for themselves, causing local prices to spike.

=== December 12 ===
- Despite recent apparent attempts by the US to dissuade violence in northern Syria, Turkish President Tayyip Erdogan announced Turkey will launch a new military operation targeting US-backed Kurdish territory (DFNS) east of Manbij "in a few days".

=== December 14 ===
- The SDF, supported by heavy US-led Coalition airstrikes, capture the stronghold of Hajin from the Islamic State, depriving the battered terror group of its last de facto capital within its fledgling pocket of territory in the Middle Euphrates River Valley.

=== December 19 ===
- Proclaiming ISIL's defeat, US President Donald Trump orders the deliberate withdrawal of all of the approximately 2,000–2,500 American troops from Syria "within 60–100 days". Reuters reports the move comes after a phone call between Trump and the Turkish President Erdogan. French forces are to remain.

=== December 21 ===
- Following the US announcement to withdraw all troops, Turkey postponed the planned attack on Northern Syria.

=== December 23 ===
- According to the SOHR, at a meeting in Moscow, the Russians offered to deploy troops of the Syrian government along the border between Turkey and the territory of the DFNS.

=== December 24 ===
- With the previous announcement of the withdrawal of US troops, Iraq's prime minister Adil Abdul-Mahdi says Iraqi troops could potentially be deployed to Syria.

=== December 25 ===
- In the face of the planned withdrawal of US forces and the Turkish preparations to attack the DFNS, the SDF handed over the town of Arima west of Manbij to troops of the Syrian government.

=== December 27 ===
- The United Arab Emirates re-opens its embassy in Damascus in an effort to restore relations between the two countries. Bahrain would follow suit the next day.

=== December 28 ===
- Three days after handing over Arima to the Syrian army amid the continued mobilization of Turkish regular and Turkish-backed Free Syrian Army forces, conflicting reports emerged surrounding the YPG's inviting of Syrian troops to enter Manbij in order to deter the Turks from attacking the city. SOHR stated Syrian troops had deployed around the Manbij countryside while US-led Coalition officials denied that the SAA had taken Manbij as US forces continued to patrol in and around Manbij with no immediate plans to leave. In a future conflict, the Kurds want the Syrians to control Manbij, not pro-Turkish rebels. Turkey decried that the Kurds have no authority to make decisions on behalf of the region's people.

=== December 30 ===
- SANA reports that Syrian President Assad authorized Iraqi warplanes and artillery to strike ISIL targets in Syrian territory without having to seek prior approval from Damascus, a sign of improved relations and coordination between the neighboring countries.

=== December 31 ===
- Syrian government forces and Iran-backed militias intensify their attacks on civilian settlements in Homs and Idlib province's de-escalation zone despite a ceasefire agreement, killing two civilians and wounding six others in a camp for displaced people.
