= 2024 Homs airstrikes =

Israeli attacks in Syria

- Part of the Iran–Israel conflict during the Syrian civil war and the Middle Eastern crisis (2023–present)
- Type: Missile strikes
- Location: Homs, Syria
- Date: 7 February 2024
- Executed by: Israeli Air Force
- Casualties: 10 killed

On 7 February 2024, the Israeli Air Force launched missile attacks against a number of locations in Homs in central Syria, killing 10 people, including 6 civilians and 2 Hezbollah members. The missile attacks took place after the US Air Force attacked locations in Iraq and Syria on 2 February 2024.

== Background ==
Since the Israel–Gaza war began on 7 October 2023, there has been an escalation in Israeli attacks against Syria. Israel has consistently conducted missile attacks against locations it claims to be connected to Iran since the Syrian civil war broke out in 2011, rarely commenting on these actions. There has been an Iranian presence in Syria since the beginning of the Syrian civil war, with Iranian forces bolstering the government of President Bashar al-Assad against rebel forces.

On 2 February 2024, the United States Air Force launched attacks against what it claimed were militia sites in Iraq and Syria, killing 45 people in after the Tower 22 drone strike that killed 3 US soldiers in Jordan.

== Airstrikes ==
At 00:30 local time (UTC+3), Israel launched missile attacks against Homs from the direction of north of Tripoli in Lebanon, targeting Shayrat Airbase and other locations near the city of Homs and the countryside. The missile attacks demolished a building in one of Homs' most affluent districts, as well as other locations allegedly linked to militias. There was damage to private and public property in the al-Malaab neighborhood and Hamra street, where at least nine explosions were heard. According to the head of the Syrian Observatory for Human Rights, Rami Abdel Rahman, 10 people were killed, including 6 civilians and 2 Hezbollah members. Among the dead were 3 students, a woman and a child.

Syrian state media stated that the Syrian Air Defense Force intercepted and shot down Israeli missiles.
