= Syria missile strikes (January 2021) =

Series of airstrikes

- Part of the Iran–Israel conflict in the Syrian civil war
- Location: Deir ez-Zor Governorate and Hama Governorate, Syria: Deir ez-Zor District; Mayadin District; Abu Kamal District
- Planned by: Israel
- Target: Liwa Fatemiyoun
- Date: 13 January 2021; 22 January 2021
- Executed by: Israeli Air Force
- Casualties: 57 on 13 January; 4 civilians on 22 January; Total – 61

A series of airstrikes were carried out by the Israeli Air Force on multiple Iranian-linked targets in the Deir ez-Zor Governorate of Syria on 13 January 2021. 57 people were killed according to Israeli reports. Iranian sources confirmed the strikes, but said that only Syrian Army positions were hit. Israel carried out another airstrike in Hama nine days later, killing a family of four, including two children, according to Syrian state media.

== Airstrikes ==
According to the Syrian state news agency SANA Israeli aircraft carried out aerial assault at 1:10am on Deir ez-Zor city and the Al Bukamal region. The strikes were aimed at arms depots and military positions belonging to the Liwa Fatemiyoun. The Syrian Observatory for Human Rights confirmed that over 18 strikes had struck the area. The first reports mentioned a death toll of 23 killed and around 30 people injured. Later that day the death toll was adjusted to 57, including 14 Syrian regime forces, 16 Iraqi militias and 11 Iran-backed fighters. The Israeli strikes in both Deir ez-Zor city and Mayadin destroyed weapons warehouses and headquarters. While in Al Bukamal military positions and ammunition depots were targeted.

With the risen death toll, these were the deadliest airstrikes conducted by the Israeli Air Force on eastern Syria since the start of the conflict. Observers have warned that Israel and the United States will increase attacks against Iran in the final days of the Trump administration, which gave unprecedented support to the government of the Israeli prime minister, Benjamin Netanyahu. US officials confirmed that the strikes were carried out with intelligence provided by the United States. According to one official, US Secretary of State Mike Pompeo discussed the airstrikes two days earlier with Yossi Cohen, chief of Israel's Mossad spy agency, in Washington, D.C.

Israel carried out another airstrike in the country on 22 January 2021, near the city of Hama, killing a family of four, including two children. This marked the first time Israel carried out a military operation in Syria since the new US president Joe Biden took office.

== Aftermath ==
The SOHR reported on 15 January that the Iranian-backed factions started to redeploy in the cities of al-Mayadin and Abu Kamal, as well as along the Syria-Iraq border. According to observers in the region, the militias changed their positions and started to redeploy vehicles in different neighborhoods of Mayadin.

Following the fear of new Israeli attacks on Iranian positions in Syria, dozens of pro-Iranian fighters left their militias to join the Fifth Corps established by Russia.

== Reactions ==
- Iran – A deputy commander of the Quds Force of the IRGC, Ahmad Karimkhani, rejected some reports and denied the killing of any IRGC and Fatemiyoun members during the raids calling it "fake propaganda". He added that Israeli attacks on IRGC forces positions on Syria will face a harsh reaction.
- Israel – Israel's Defense Minister Benny Gantz generally stated that Israel will "remain vigilant on all our frontiers". He further reiterated that Israel will take action against anyone who tries to challenge them, whether they are close by or far away. "We’re not sitting and waiting.", he added. The Minister of Settlement Affairs, Tzachi Hanegbi, commented that "Israel is determined to prevent Iranian military entrenchment in Syria".
- Liwa Fatemiyoun – The commander of the Liwa Fatemiyoun denied that any of their fighters were killed in the strikes, saying that only Syrian Army positions were hit. Therefore, he called the claims published by western media false.

== See also ==
- Syria missile strikes (September 2018)
- Syria missile strikes (August 2019)
- Syria missile strikes (November 2019)
