= Iran–Israel conflict during the Syrian civil war =

Conflict resulted from the Syrian Civil War

- Part of the Iran–Israel proxy conflict, the Iranian and Israeli role in the Syrian civil war
Date	30 January 2013 – 8 December 2024 (11 years, 10 months, 1 week and 1 day)
Location	Syria–Israel ceasefire line, Syrian territories
Result	Fall of the Assad regime: Iranian withdrawal from Syria; Israeli invasion of Syria

Belligerents
Israel	Iran; Hezbollah; Syria; Iran-backed militias

Commanders and leaders
(Israel) Benjamin Netanyahu (2013–2021; 2022–2024); (Israel) Yair Lapid (2022); (Israel) Naftali Bennett (2021–2022)	(Iran) Ali Khamenei (2013–2024); (Iran) Hassan Rouhani (2013–2021); (Iran) Ebrahim Raisi (2021–2024); (Iran) Mohammad Mokhber (Note: As the acting President of Iran .) (2024); (Iran) Masoud Pezeshkian (2024); (Hezbollah) Hassan Nasrallah (2013–2024); (Hezbollah) Naim Qassem (2024); (Syria) Bashar al-Assad (2013–2024)

Casualties and losses
2 wounded	1,140 killed (Since April 2018) (Note: 2024: 233 killed; 92 Militia; 46 Syrian troops; 43 Hezbollah; 24 IRGC; 23 civilians; 2023: 159 killed; 79 Militia; 40 Syrians; 26 Hezbollah; 7 IRGC; 7 civilians; 2022: 90 killed; 51 Militia; 36 Syrians; 2 IRGC; 1 civilian; 2021: 130 killed; 99 Militia; 26 Syrians; 5 civilians; 2020: 217 killed; 180 Militia; 21 IRGC; 12 Syrians; 4 civilians; April–December 2019: 99 killed (Note: 3 (IRGC), 11 (7 militia, 4 Syrians), 18 (militia), 5 (3 militia, 2 Hezbollah); 9 (6 IRGC, 3 Syrians); 9 (Militia); 13 (9 militia, 6 civilians, 1 Syrian); 31 (25 militia, 6 Syrians)); April 2018–April 2019: 232 killed; 146 Militia; 86 Syrians): 721 killed; (Syria) 256 killed; (Iran) 53 killed; (Hezbollah) 71 killed
- 35 Syrian civilians killed

With increasing Iranian involvement in Syrian civil war from 2011 onwards, the conflict between Iran and Israel shifted from a proxy war into a direct confrontation by early 2018.

== History ==
One of the first reported Israeli airstike against Iranian-linked targets in Syria was on 30 January 2013, when Israeli aircraft struck a Syrian convoy in Rif Dimashq allegedly transporting Iranian weapons to Hezbollah.

Israel historically refused to comment on its purported actions in Syria, allegedly so that the Syrian government would not feel obliged to retaliate.

In March 2017, Syria launched anti-aircraft missiles toward Israeli-controlled parts of the Golan Heights, allegedly targeting Israeli Air Force aircraft, which Syria claimed were on their way to attack targets in Palmyra, Syria. After the incident, the State of Israel stated it was targeting weapons shipments headed toward anti-Israeli forces, specifically Hezbollah, located in Lebanon. Israel denied Syria's claim that one jet fighter was shot down with another one damaged. Israel has not reported any pilots or aircraft missing in Syria, or anywhere else in the Middle East following the incident. According to some sources, the incident was the first time Israeli officials confirmed an Israeli strike on a Hezbollah convoy during the Syrian Civil War.

By early December 2017, the Israeli Air Force confirmed at least 100 attacks over the past six years in Syria, all targeting arms convoys of Hezbollah and the Ba'athists. In September 2018, the Israeli Air Force stated that it had conducted over 200 airstrikes on Iranian targets in 2017–2018 alone.

The most significant direct encounter to date between Israel and Iran, was on 18 May 2018, when Israel claimed it struck nearly all key Iranian military targets in Syria, including the IRGC's logisitics headquarters, after an Iranian rocket attack in the Golan Heights. Israel's response was its largest strike in Syria since the Yom Kippur War in 1973.

In 2023 and 2024, following the start of the Gaza war, the Israeli strikes in Syria increased in frequency and intensity. It was reported that Israel stopped providing advanced warnings and were "bombing to kill".

== Timeline ==
=== 2013 ===
On 30 January 2013, Israeli aircraft allegedly struck a Syrian convoy transporting Iranian weapons to Hezbollah. Other sources stated the targeted site was a military research center in Jamraya responsible for developing biological and chemical weapons.

Two additional air strikes, also attributed to Israel, reportedly took place on 3 and 5 May 2013. Both allegedly targeted long-ranged weapons sent from Iran to Hezbollah.

According to anonymous US officials, Israel launched another attack on 5 July. It allegedly targeted Russian-made Yakhont anti-ship missiles near the city of Latakia and killed several Syrian troops. While initial reports claimed that it was an airstrike, Israeli media later reported that the attack had been carried out with cruise missiles launched from a Dolphin class submarine.

An unidentified U.S. administration official on 31 October said Israeli warplanes struck a Syrian base near the port of Latakia, targeting missiles that Israel thought might be transferred to its Lebanese militia enemy Hezbollah.

The relationship between the Popular Front for the Liberation of Palestine (PFLP) and the Islamic Republic of Iran strengthened as a result of Hamas moving away from Iran due to differing positions in the Syrian Civil War. Iran rewarded the Popular Front for the Liberation of Palestine's pro-Assad stance with an increase in financial and military assistance. Abu Ahmad Fouad, a PFLP political bureau member said that the group might retaliate toward Israel if the United States bombs Syria.

On 15 December 2013, a Lebanese sniper opened fire at an Israeli vehicle traveling near the border area of Rosh Hanikra, killing a soldier inside. Several hours later, the Israeli military said it shot two Lebanese soldiers after spotting "suspicious movement" in the same area.

=== 2014 ===
Syrian opposition sources, as well as Lebanese sources, reported that another strike happened in Latakia on 26 January 2014. Explosions were reported in the city and Israeli planes were reported over Lebanon. The target was allegedly S-300 missiles.

It was reported that Israeli aircraft carried out two airstrikes against Hezbollah facilities in Lebanon near the border with Syria on 24 February 2014, killing several militants. The Syrian Observatory for Human Rights claimed the attack targeted a Hezbollah missile base.

On 7 December 2014, Israeli jets allegedly bombed areas near Damascus international airport and in the town of Dimas, near the border with Lebanon. According to foreign reports, the attack targeted a warehouse of advanced S-300 missiles, which were en route from Syria to Hezbollah in Lebanon. Al Arabiya reported that two Hezbollah militants were killed in the strikes, including a senior military official.

=== 2015 ===
On 18 January 2015, Israeli helicopters allegedly attacked a Hezbollah's convoy in the Syrian-controlled part of Golan Heights, killing six prominent members of Hezbollah and six IRGC commanders, including a General. On 28 January, Hezbollah fired an anti-tank missile at an Israeli military convoy in the Shebaa farms, killing two soldiers and wounding seven. Israel responded with at least 50 artillery shells across the border into southern Lebanon, in which a Spanish UN peacekeeper was killed.

On 25 April 2015, a series of attacks attributed to the Israeli Air Force was made in the al-Qalamoun region of Syria against Hezbollah camps and weapons convoys in two brigade bases. Al-Nusra Front, however, has also claimed the attacks.

On 29 July 2015, Israeli airplanes reportedly struck a vehicle located in a Druze village in southwestern Syria, killing Hezbollah men and a pro-Assad militiaman. A second airstrike targeted a military base along the Syrian-Lebanese border belonging to a pro-Syrian Palestinian faction.

On 20 and 21 August 2015, after four rockets hit the Golan Heights and Upper Galilee, Israel allegedly launched airstrikes in Syria, killing several militants.

According to Syrian media, on 31 October 2015, Israeli aircraft attacked numerous Hezbollah targets in southern Syria, close to the border with Lebanon in the Qalamoun Mountains region. Estimated targets included a weapons convoy destined for Hezbollah. It was reported another Israeli airstrike near Damascus airport on 11 November that targeted Hezbollah weapons warehouses.

The Syrian opposition reported an Israeli airstrike in the Qualamoun area of the Syria–Lebanon border on 23 November 2015. According to these sources, the strike killed 13 Syrian troops and Hezbollah fighters, and left dozens wounded, including four seriously. The Qualamoun region has been a major transit point for Hezbollah fighters and other logistical equipment to and from Syria. According to Syrian sources, Israeli aircraft attacked again the Syrian army and Hezbollah targets in the area around Qalamoun on 28 November, causing dead and wounded among Hezbollah fighters.

On 19 December 2015, eight people, including Samir Kuntar and other Hezbollah commanders, were killed by an explosion on the outskirts of Damascus. According to Syrian government sources, Kuntar was killed by a "terrorist rocket attack". Hezbollah claimed that the building was destroyed by an air-to-surface missile launched by Israeli Air Force jets. On 21 December, the Free Syrian Army released a video clip claiming responsibility for killing Kuntar.

Sources affiliated with the Syrian opposition reported that Israeli aircraft attacked seven positions belonging to Hezbollah in the Qalamoun Mountains area on 26 December 2015.

=== 2016 ===
Arab media reported that on 30 November 2016, Israeli jets allegedly struck a Syrian military compound in Damascus and a Hezbollah weapons convoy on the Damascus-Beirut highway.

On 7 December 2016, Syria and Hezbollah accused Israel of launching surface-to-surface missiles targeting the Mezzeh airbase near Damascus. Unnamed Syrian sources told the Lebanese newspaper Elnashra that the strikes targeted the airport's runway and operations command center, while another unnamed source said that the strikes targeted the regime's 4th division operations center at the airport. A Syrian opposition group said the target was a convoy of chemical weapons en route to Hezbollah.

=== 2017 ===
On 12 January 2017, Israeli warplanes were blamed for striking the Mezzeh Airbase in rural Damascus. According to an Al-Masdar field correspondent, the target was an ammunition depot, causing a massive explosion that could be heard from the Syrian capital.

On 22 February 2017, Israeli jets struck a Hezbollah weapons shipment near Damascus.

The March 2017 Israel–Syria incident took place on 17 March 2017, when several Syrian S-200 missiles were fired at Israeli Air Force jets, allegedly aiming to attack targets in Syria, near a military installation in Palmyra, and one missile was shot down by an "aerial defense system", likely an Arrow missile. The State of Israel has stated it was targeting weapons shipments headed toward anti-Israeli forces, specifically Hezbollah, located in Lebanon. Israel denied Syria's claim that one jet fighter was shot down and another damaged. Israel has not reported any pilots or aircraft missing in Syria, or anywhere else in the Middle East following the raids. Also, neither Syria nor Hezbollah has shown photos or video of downed Israeli aircraft or personnel. According to some sources, the incident was the first time Israeli officials confirmed an Israeli strike on Syrian territory during the Syrian Civil War, though IDF declined any comment concerning the location of targets.

On 27 April 2017, Syria's state-run SANA news agency said that there was an explosion felt at Damascus International Airport at 3:42 am. No casualties were reported. The blast was reportedly felt 15 kilometres (9.3 mi) away. The Israeli Intelligence Minister Yisrael Katz appeared to take responsibility for the explosion, telling Army Radio that "The incident in Syria corresponds completely with Israel's policy to act to prevent Iran's smuggling of advanced weapons via Syria to Hezbollah." Two rebel sources told Reuters that "five strikes hit an ammunition depot used by Iran-backed militias."

On 7 September 2017, The Guardian reported that the Syrian military said in a statement that Israeli jets carried out airstrikes on the Syrian Scientific Studies and Research Centre, a Syrian government military research facility where it was rumoured to contain chemical weapons near the city of Masyaf, Hama Governorate, killing at least two Syrian Army soldiers. The missiles were fired from Lebanese air space; the Syrian Observatory for Human Rights and other sources identified the target as the al-Talai facility; and Syrian opposition sources said four Israeli aircraft were involved in the strike. The US claims the research center developed the sarin gas weapon allegedly used in the Khan Shaykhun chemical attack; Yaakov Amidror a former Israeli national security adviser, said "For many years it has been one of the Syrian centers for research and development for weapons systems including chemical weapons … and weapons that have been transferred to Hezbollah." The director of the Israeli national security council's counter-terrorism bureau called for the destruction of the center in 2010, alleging it had provided weapons to Hezbollah and Hamas.

On 22 September 2017, some sources reported that Israeli jets carried out three separate strikes on targets near the Damascus International Airport, which the SOHR reported to have struck Hezbollah weapons depots.

On 16 October, Israeli aircraft destroyed a Syrian SA-5 anti-aircraft battery east of Damascus after it fired a missile at Israeli jets that were on a routine aerial reconnaissance flight in Lebanese airspace. On the morning of 16 October 2017, according to the Israeli military, Israeli jets attacked a Ba'athist Syrian anti-aircraft missile launcher after it fired on Israeli aircraft flying in Lebanon's air space, close to the Syrian border, for a reconnaissance mission; an Israeli military spokesman said it was the first time Israeli aircraft had been targeted by Syrian forces while flying over Lebanon since the Syrian war began.

On 1 November 2017, Arab media claimed Israeli jets allegedly bombed a weapons depot situated in rural areas around Hisya, south of Homs. Several reports claimed that the Syrians launched a surface-to-air missile against Israeli aircraft but did not hit them. Arab media also reported Israeli strikes and anti-aircraft missile launches from Iranian bases near al-Kiswahon on 2 December 2017.

In the early morning of 2 December 2017, a military site near Al-Kiswah south of Damascus was attacked by missiles reputedly from the Israeli military; two of the surface-to-surface missiles launched were intercepted by Syrian air defense, according to Syrian media reports. The incident was three days after followed by a report by Syria that claimed that Syrian air defense units had shot down three Israeli missiles that were targeting a military post near Damascus; there was no Israeli comment on the incident. Another attack was reported on 7 December.

=== 2018 ===
==== February 2018 ====
On 7 February 2018, Syrian state media said that Israeli warplanes attacked a military position in the Damascus countryside from Lebanese airspace, with Syrian air defenses destroying most of the missiles. Other reports stated that the target was the Scientific Research Center in Jamraya, west of Damascus and that the same position had been targeted by Israel twice before. Some activists claim that the position contains arms depots used by Hezbollah.

Israel conducted further airstrikes in Syria in February 2018 which were believed to target weapon transfers to Hezbollah. Subsequently, an Iranian-made drone was shot down over northern Israel and an IAF F-16 was shot down by Syrian anti-aircraft fire in retaliatory strikes. Both aircrews ejected and landed safely before the plane crashed near the Harduf kibbutz and the IAF followed up with further strikes against targets of Syrian air defenses and Iranian drone-control facilities.

==== March 2018 ====
On 17 March 2018, the Israeli Air Force struck a target in Syria. In response, the Syrian Army fired several S-200 missiles at Israeli jets above Golan Heights. Israel reported that one Syrian missile had been shot down by an Arrow 2 missile, while none of its aircraft had been damaged. Israel stated it was targeting weapon shipments headed toward anti-Israeli forces, specifically Hezbollah, in Lebanon, while the Syrian Army claimed that a military site near Palmyra had been struck.

==== April 2018 ====
Russia and Syria accused Israel of carrying out an airstrike on 9 April 2018, against Tiyas air base, also known as the T-4 air base, outside Palmyra in central Syria. The Russian defense ministry said the Israeli aircraft launched eight missiles at the base from Lebanese airspace, five of which were intercepted by Syrian air defense systems. According to the Syrian Observatory for Human Rights monitor, at least 14 people were killed, and more were wounded. Among the dead were seven Iranian soldiers. On 16 April, an unnamed Israeli military official confirmed to the New York Times his country conducted the airstrikes.

At least 26 pro-regime fighters were killed by missile strikes on 29 April in the Hama Province of central Syria. According to Iran's state media, 18 of them were Iranians. The strikes also hit an airbase in the nearby Aleppo Province storing surface-to-surface missiles. "Given the nature of the target, it is likely to have been an Israeli strike", according to SOHR.

==== May 2018 ====
Arab media reported that on 6 May 2018, eight members of the Syrian Air Force's 150th Air Defense Division were killed in a mysterious explosion in the morning on the Damascus-Suwayda road. Engineers and soldiers from the battalion that was responsible for the operation of the anti-aircraft system S-200 and had carried out the downing of the Israeli F-16 two months prior took a transport vehicle and suddenly the explosion took place. According to Syrian sources, eight were killed and Israel was blamed for assassinating them.

According to Syrian media, on 8 May 2018, Israeli warplanes struck several military bases in Syria where there is a significant Iranian presence. The Syrian government claimed that two Israeli missiles that were targeting a weapons convoy at a base were downed near the al-Kiswah industrial zones close to Damascus.

On 10 May, Iranian elite forces on the Syrian-held side of the Golan Heights were accused by IDF of having fired around 20 projectiles toward Israeli army positions causing no damage or injuries. Israel responded with the "most extended strike in Syria in decades". According to Russia's Defense Ministry, this involved 28 planes and the fire of 70 missiles. However, the Syrian Arab Army claimed responsibility for the attack on Israeli army positions.

On 18 May, massive explosions hit the Hama Military Airport. Sky News Arabia reported that it was caused by targeted strikes against an Iranian Bavar 373 long-range missile defense system that was put into service in March 2017. The Baghdad Post reported that Israeli jets targeted the IRGC positions at the airport and that the shelling came shortly after hitting the positions of the Iraqi militias who gathered there.

On 24 May, warplanes flying from Lebanese airspace conducted a strike near an airport in Homs, following earlier reports of Israeli aircraft being seen above Lebanon. According to the Syrian Al-Marsad organization for human rights, the attack was aimed at a Hezbollah base. Twenty-one people were reportedly killed in the strike, including nine Iranians.

==== June 2018 ====
According to the Kuwaiti newspaper Al-Jarida, Israel struck Iraqi Shiite militants in Syria with the approval of both Russia and the United States on 18 June 2018, killing 52. Syrian official news agency SANA reported that two Israeli missiles struck near Damascus International Airport on 26 June. Local activists claimed that Israeli warplanes targeted an Iranian cargo plane that was being unloaded at the airport. UK-Based Syrian Observatory for Human Rights said that the Israeli missiles hit arms depots for Hezbollah near the airport and Syrian air defense systems failed to prevent the Israeli strikes.

==== July 2018 ====
According to the Syrian opposition, an Israeli airstrike destroyed ammunition warehouses belonging to the Assad regime and pro-Assad militias in the Deraa district of southern Syria on 3 July.

Syrian State TV reported on 8 July that Israeli aircraft targeted the T-4 air base near Homs, and Syrian air defense systems shot down many incoming missiles. While Syrian state media did not report any casualties, the Syrian opposition stated nine people were killed in the strikes. Citing Arab media sources, Al Jazeera claimed between four and six rockets hit the base and its surroundings.

On 11 July 2018, after an Israeli Patriot missile intercepted a Syrian reconnaissance drone which infiltrated northern Israel, Israel attacked three Syrian military posts in the Quneitra area.

Syrian media reported that on 15 July Israel attacked the Nayrab military airport outside Aleppo. In the past Al-Nayrab has been linked to Iranian forces. On 22 July, Syrian state television reported that an Israeli airstrike hit a military site in the city of Misyaf in the Hama province, causing only material damage. An intelligence source assessed that a military research center for chemical arms production was located near the city.

On 22 July 2018, SANA claimed that a facility at Masyaf had been struck. The Syrian Observatory for Human Rights confirmed that an attack had targeted the location and claimed that it was being used for the assembly of surface-to-surface missiles, under the supervision of Iranian forces. it further claimed that Iranian and Hizbollah units were present in the vicinity. The facility struck is reported to have been under the control of the Scientific Studies and Research Center which has been suspected of being responsible for the production of chemical weapons. The site was allegedly previously struck in September 2017.

On 24 July, the Israel Defense Forces (IDF) intercepted a Syrian Sukhoi fighter jet that they said had crossed about one mile into Israeli airspace. The IDF shot the aircraft down using two Patriot missiles.

==== September 2018 ====
Large explosions were reported at a Syrian military air base near Damascus on 2 September 2018 in a strike attributed by some to Israeli warplanes. However, Syria denied an attack had taken place, saying the blasts were caused by an explosion at an ammunition dump provoked by electrical malfunctions. Israel didn't issue any statement regarding the incident.

Syrian state media reported that Israeli aircraft attacked Iranian positions in the city of Hama on 4 September 2018, killing at least one person and injuring twelve others. According to a military source, Syrian air defenses intercepted several missiles over the nearby town of Wadi al-Uyun. Additional strikes were reported in Baniyas as well. Israel revealed that its forces have carried out more than 200 airstrikes against Iranian targets in Syria and fired over 800 missiles and mortar shells over the past year and a half, causing an interruption of Iran's arms smuggling and the evacuation of several Iranian bases in Syria. Israel allegedly targeted Damascus airport on 15 September, destroying a weapons depot with newly arrived arms for Hezbollah or the Iranian military. Syrian state media claimed Israeli missiles were intercepted.

On 17 September, the Israeli Air Force conducted missile strikes on a weapons facility near Latakia. The IDF acknowledged the airstrikes the following day. SANA news agency reported ten people had been injured. According to the Syrian Observatory for Human Rights, 113 Iranian soldiers were killed during the past month as a result of Israeli strikes in Syria. During or within 40 minutes after the strikes, an Il-20 ELINT reconnaissance plane, with 15 Russian servicemen on board, which was coming in to land at the Russian Khmeimim Air Base, was shot down in a friendly fire incident by Syrian air defense systems that sought to target the Israeli aircraft. Russia's defence minister Sergey Shoygu blamed Israel's military for the accident because, according to the ministry, the Russian military had only received one minute's warning from Israel about the impending missile strikes and the four Israeli F-16 jets that conducted the strikes deliberately used the Russian plane as cover to allow them to approach their targets on the ground without being hit by Syrian fire. On 20 September in Moscow, an Israeli delegation led by commander of the Israeli Air Force Amikam Norkin presented to Russia Air Force commands Israel's inquiry on the bombing of an Iranian-Hezbollah advanced weapons transfer site and the related loss of the IL-20. The IDF stated that their planes were already landing in Israel when Syrian antiaircraft missiles shot down the Russian IL-20.

==== November 2018 ====
Israeli missiles reportedly targeted sites belonging to Iranian-backed militias in al-Kiswah on 29 November 2018. Fragments of a Syrian anti-aircraft missile were found in an open area on Israel's side of the Golan Heights several hours after Syrian media said it had downed "hostile targets" over the southern part of the country the previous night. Israeli military sources denied any plane was shot down.

==== December 2018 ====
Alleged Israeli airstrike in Damascus, targeting Hezbollah and weaponry. Israeli air defenses, probably Arrow missile were fired from Hadera toward a Syrian surface to air missile.

=== 2019 ===
==== January 2019 ====
The IDF stated that it bombed 202 Iranian targets from January 2017 to September 2018 alone, using over 800 bombs and missiles, an average of one strike every three days. The 202 targets were mostly shipments of advanced weaponry, as well as military bases and infrastructure used by the IRGC and their proxy militias, which the IDF officials said drove Iranian forces to abandon some posts.

The Syrian Observatory for Human Rights reported that on 12 January 2019, Israeli aircraft attacked missile depots belonging to Hezbollah in the al-Kiswah area and Damascus International Airport. Israeli Prime Minister Netanyahu said, "Only in the last 36 hours did the air force strike targets in Syria and we have proven that we will stop the settlement of Iran in Syria." The strikes destroyed a building and radar site at the airport as well as a radar site in the Suwayda countryside and damaged a suspected Iranian target in a Syrian military base next to Jamraya.

Local Syrian media and Syrian opposition sources reported that on 20 January 2019, Israeli missiles were fired at Damascus International Airport and the town of al-Kiswah. The Syrian military claimed nine missiles were intercepted by its air defenses. IDF reported that the Iron Dome system intercepted an incoming projectile from Syria, which was heading toward the northern Golan Heights. Israel retaliated by attacking Iranian targets near Damascus and Syrian air defense batteries that fired upon the attacking Israeli jets. The Syrian Observatory for Human Rights said 21 people died in the strikes, including 12 Iranian fighters. On 23 January, Russian Foreign Ministry spokeswoman Maria Zakharova said Israel must stop its "arbitrary" air incursions into Syria. Syria's envoy to the UN Bashar Jaafari raised the prospect of retaliatory Syrian attacks on Tel Aviv airport.

The Syrian Observatory for Human Rights reported that on 12 January 2019, Israeli aircraft attacked missile depots belonging to Hezbollah in the al-Kiwash area and the Damascus international airport. Israeli Prime Minister Benjamin Netanyahu said, "Only in the last 36 hours did the air force strike targets in Syria and we have proven that we will stop the settlement of Iran in Syria."

==== March 2019 ====
On 27 March, an Israeli airstrike northeast of Aleppo on a weapons depot killed one Iranian and six Iraqi fighters.

==== April 2019 ====
On 13 April, Syria says Israel launched airstrikes at a military academy near Masyaf known as the "Accounting School", along with targeting a missile development center in a village near Masyaf, and a nearby military base run by Iran-backed fighters. The strikes injured at least 6 soldiers. The SOHR reports that 17 were wounded and deaths occurred, but no number was given.

==== May 2019 ====
On 27 May, an Israeli aircraft destroyed a Syrian anti-aircraft battery, killing 2 soldiers (one of whom was an officer).

==== June 2019 ====
On 3 June, Syrian state media reported that Israel attacked the Tiyas Military Airbase near the northern city of Homs, killing 1 to 5 soldiers. Independent satellite imagery analysis showed that the strikes were aimed at a specific recently arrived weapons cache from Iran, possibly UAVs.

==== July 2019 ====
On 1 July, Israel performed strikes on multiple Iranian and Syrian military targets outside Damascus and Homs, killing 16 people (including 9 foreign militiamen) and wounding 21. A stray Syrian S-200 missile fired in response to the Israeli strikes crashed and exploded on a mountain near Vouno in Northern Cyprus, located 20 km (12 miles) northeast of Nicosia, causing no injuries but starting a fire.

On 23 July, Israel launched missile strikes on military positions and intelligence facilities belonging to Iran and Iran-controlled militias, killing 6 Iranian soldiers and 3 militiamen.

==== August 2019 ====
On 24 August, the Israel Defense Forces (IDF) conducted strikes on targets near Damascus, citing a successful attempt to obstruct an Iranian drone attack on Israel. At 23.30 aircraft defenses were detected from Golan heading towards the area around Damascus. According to the IDF sites in the town of Aqrabah, southeast of Damascus, near the city's airport was targeted. As a result of the strikes, several Military Intelligence units, air force squadrons, and air defense units were put on high alert. Supplementary air defenses forces were deployed to northern Israel for a precautionary measure. As Syrian state TV announced, Syrian air army had responded to "hostile" targets over Damascus, they reported that "most of the hostile Israeli missiles were destroyed before reaching their targets".

==== September 2019 ====
On 9 September, Israeli aircraft struck an arms depot belonging to a pro-Iranian Iraqi militia, killing 21 militiamen and demolishing the facility.

On 17 September, Israeli aircraft struck another weapons depot belonging to pro-Iranian Iraqi militiamen, killing another 10 fighters.

==== November 2019 ====
On 12 November, Israel unsuccessfully attempted to kill Akram al-Ajouri, a senior commander of the Iran-backed Palestinian Islamic Jihad (PIJ). However, the airstrike killed his son and bodyguard.

On 19 November, after four missiles were fired and intercepted at Israeli-controlled Golan, Israeli aircraft attacked Syrian and Iranian targets in Syria, including advanced air defense systems, surface-to-air missiles, reconnaissance sites and warehouses, the National Defense Building at the Damascus International Airport which houses the Quds Force headquarters and other military positions. According to the British-based Syrian Observatory for Human Rights (SOHR), 23 people were killed, including sixteen foreigners (most likely Iranians).

=== 2020 ===
==== January 2020 ====
9–10 January, unidentified planes, probably belonging to Israel, killed eight fighters from pro-Iranian Iraqi militia, the Imam Ali Brigades, by targeting their arms depots along with other trucks carrying a weapons shipment to Lebanese Hezbollah, in the vicinity of Al-Bukamal and Al-Qitaa.

==== February 2020 ====
On 6 February, Israeli warplanes fire missiles near Damascus, Syria. A pro-opposition war monitor said army positions and Iran-backed militias were targeted, killing 15 fighters, including five Syrians and at least three Iranians. Syria said eight fighters were wounded and Israel intended to "save the armed terrorist organizations which have been collapsing in Idlib and western Aleppo Governorate in front of the strikes of the Syrian Army".

On 13 February, Israeli missiles targeted Iranian warehouses between the Damascus International Airport and the Sayyidah Zaynab neighborhood. Israeli strikes on Damascus airport killed seven fighters. Rami Abdel Rahman, the director of the Britain-based Observatory, said the dead were three Syrian soldiers and four members of Iran's Revolutionary Guard.

On 24 February, Israeli warplanes killed six people near the Damascus International Airport including Iran-backed fighters and two members of the Palestinian Islamic Jihad. On 27 February, Israeli warplanes killed a Syrian policeman in the Quneitra Governorate, as he was initially thought to be related to Hezbollah.

==== March 2020 ====
On 5 March, Israeli raids targeted Al-Qusayr and Shayrat Military Airbases, the headquarters of Hezbollah near Homs refinery, and Tulul al-Humur in Quneitra Governorate. The raids resulted in the killing of one Syrian soldier and injuring others.

On 7 March, an IRGC commander, Farhad Dabirian, was reported to be killed a day earlier in the Sayyidah Zaynab neighborhood in Damascus, without giving details on the circumstances of his death. Dabirian was responsible for operations against the Islamic State in Palmyra.

On 11 March, three warplanes targeted the al-Hassian area near the Syrian town of Al-Bukamal, which resulted in the killing of 26 of the Iraqi Popular Mobilization. However, the US-led coalition denied carrying out those airstrikes in Syria.

On 31 March, Syrian media claimed that Israeli planes targeted Shayrat Airbase with at least eight missiles from Lebanon's airspace.

==== April 2020 ====
On 15 April two Israeli airstrikes targeted the Hezbollah commander Mustafa Mughniyeh in Jdeideh Yabous, near the Syrian-Lebanese border. No one was hurt in the incident.

On 20 April, Syrian authorities stated that they intercepted Israeli airstrikes, fired from Lebanese airspace, which killed 9 Iran-backed fighters in Palmyra.

On 27 April, Israeli airstrikes fired from Lebanese airspace targeting Iranian forces in al-Hujaira and al-Adliya, south of Damascus, killed 4 militants and 3 civilians. The Syrian military claimed to have shot down most of the missiles.

On 30 April, Israeli helicopters fired five rockets from the Golan Heights over the southern Syrian border, at Tall al Ahmar al Gharbi in the Quneitra region, and also near Maaraba, Daraa.

==== May 2020 ====
SOHR reported that on 5 May 14 Iranian and Iraqi militiamen were killed due to Israeli airstrikes on positions of Iranian forces and Iranian-backed militias in the deserts of Al-Quriyah, Al-Salihiyah and Al-Mayadin in the eastern countryside of Deir Ezzor after attacking weapons and ammunition depots in As-Safira area, south-east of Aleppo. On 15 May, an Iranian commander, Abu al-Fadl Sarlak, was announced to be killed in Khanasir, probably from the Israeli airstrikes near Aleppo.

On 16 May, SOHR reported that 7 Iranian-backed militias were killed by unidentified warplanes targeting their military base in Mueayzila near Al Bukamal.

==== June 2020 ====
On 4 June, Israeli warplanes targeted defense factories belonging to the IRGC near Masyaf, in which 9 militants were killed, according to SOHR.

On 6 June, eight airstrikes by unidentified aircraft targeted a base of pro-Iranian forces in rural Deir Ezzor, killing 12 Iraqi and Afghan fighters and destroying their equipment and ammunition, according to SOHR.

On 24 June after midnight, Israeli airstrikes targeted ammunition depots in Sabburah, Salamiyah, Aqarib and Ithriya in Hama Governorate, in addition to airstrikes at Kabbajb in Deir Ezzor Governorate, Al-Sukhna in Homs Governorate, and military facilities at Tel el-Sahn and Salkhad in Al-Suwayda Governorate. The airstrikes killed at least seven soldiers and injured several others.

On 27 June, unidentified warplanes killed at least six pro-Iranian militants including four Syrians, when they targeted their sites near Al-Abbas, Deir Ezzor Governorate, according to SOHR. The airstrikes came hours after Iranian Quds Force commander Esmail Qaani visited his forces in Al-Bukamal.

==== July 2020 ====
On 11 July, at least 35 Iran-backed fighters were killed, including IRGC officer Ibrahim Asmi, by unidentified warplanes in Deir Ezzor Governorate near the Iraqi borders, according to the Anadolu Agency.

On 20 July, military sites linked to Syrian regime forces and Iranian militias were targeted by alleged Israeli airstrikes near Damascus. Syrian air defenses also responded to Israeli missiles in As-Suwayda, Izraa and Quneitra in southern Syria. According to a monitoring group based in Britain, five Iran-backed fighters were killed in the strikes, including Hezbollah member Ali Kamel Mohsen from south Lebanon, who was killed near Damascus airport. By 26 July the death toll increased to eight pro-Iranian militants of non-Syrian nationalities.

==== August 2020 ====
On 3 August, after four attackers were killed by Israeli forces while laying improvised explosives at the border fence in southern Golan the previous day, Israeli aircraft and helicopters struck targets in Syria, including lookout points, intelligence gathering mechanisms, anti-aircraft weapons and means of control and command at military bases. Israeli airstrikes struck positions of Iranian forces and Iranian-backed militias in Imam Ali military base between 5:00 am and 9:00 am killing 15 fighters and destroying military positions, bases and weapons warehouses.

On 31 August, eleven people were killed in Israeli missile strikes in southern Syria, including three Syrian soldiers, seven pro-Iranian fighters and a civilian.

==== September 2020 ====
On 3 September 16 Iran-backed fighters were killed by suspected Israeli airstrikes. Those killed were "Iraqi paramilitary fighters loyal to Iran, seven of whom were killed outside the city of Mayadeen," Rami Abdul Rahman, head of the UK-based Syrian Observatory for Human Rights, said. The other nine were killed in strikes south of the city of Abu Kamal, on the Iraqi border further east.

On 11 September, Syrian media announced that air defenses thwarted an Israeli attack against the missile compound in Al-Safirah, outside of Aleppo, which left seven militants from the Iraqi Hezbollah dead, according to the Syrian Observatory for Human Rights.

On 14 September, at least 10 pro-Iranian militiamen were killed in airstrikes believed to have been conducted by Israel in eastern Syria, a monitor reported.

==== October 2020 ====
On 21 October, Three Iranian-backed paramilitary fighters were killed in an overnight Israeli strike that hit Syria's southern province of Quneitra, a war monitor said. The three were from the Syrian Resistance to Liberate the Golan, a group linked to the Lebanese Hezbollah movement, said Rami Abdul Rahman, head of the Britain-based Syrian Observatory for Human Rights.

==== November 2020 ====
On 15 November, six Iranian proxy militants were killed in an unidentified missile strike against the Iraq-Syria border city of Al Bukamal. It was not known whether Israeli fighter jets or the US-led international coalition had staged the raid.

On 18 November 10 people were killed during an Israeli airstrike in Syria overnight, including Iranian nationals. The casualties included: three Syrian officers and members of air-defence forces, five militiamen of "Al-Quds Corps" believed to be of Iranian nationality, and two other militiamen, but it is not known yet if they were Lebanese or Iraqis. However, Israelis claimed that the airstrikes which targeted air defense positions near Damascus airport and ammunition depots near Sayyida Zainab and al-Kiswah, came after they found three Claymore anti-personnel charges in the Golan Heights.

On 22 November 14 pro-Iranian militiamen of Afghan and Iraqi nationalities were killed during the shelling by aircraft, believed to be Israeli, in the Al-Bukamal countryside, which targeted positions affiliated with these militias in that area. Two positions and vehicles were also destroyed in the attack.

The Syrian Observatory for Human Rights has documented the killing of eight militiamen of pro-Iranian militias and Lebanese Hezbollah of non-Syrian nationalities, as a result of Israeli shelling on Jabal al-Mani in the southern Damascus countryside just before midnight.

On 26 November, airstrikes likely carried out by Israel killed at least 19 pro-Iran militia fighters in war-torn eastern Syria, a war monitor said Thursday.

According to unnamed Iraqi sources on 28 or 29 November, an airstrike allegedly killed an IRGC commander along with three other people when their vehicle was carrying weapons across the Iraqi-Syrian border. Iran however denied these reports. "We have not received any report in this regard, and it seems more like media propaganda," Saeed Khatibzadeh, the spokesman for Iran's Foreign Ministry, said, according to Iran's semi-official Mehr news agency.

==== December 2020 ====
On 25 December, Israeli warplanes targeted pro-Iran weapons facilities in the Masyaf area, after they had flown very low over parts of Lebanon. Israeli airstrikes in Syria overnight killed at least six fighters operating in pro-Iran militias in the western province of Hama, a war monitoring group said Friday.

On 30 December, SANA reported that one Syrian soldier has been killed and several others wounded in an Israeli attack on a military position in the Damascus countryside near the Zabadani Valley, citing a military source.

=== 2021 ===
==== January ====
On 7 January, Israeli airstrikes targeted pro-Iranian forces' weapons depots in the al-Kiswa area, in addition to the radar system battalion to the west of Al-Dour village in Suwayda Governorate. The strikes killed three Iran-backed fighters.

On 12–13 January, at least 10 airstrikes hit the mountains around Deir ez-Zor city killing 26 people, 14 Syrian soldiers and 12 Iranian-backed militiamen. Six airstrikes hit weapons warehouses and ammunition depots in the Al-Bokamal desert killing 16 Iraqi militiamen. Two airstrikes targeted warehouses in the Al-Mayadeen desert killing 15 foreign militiamen. In total 18 airstrikes across Deir ez-Zor Governorate killed 57 in what was the highest death toll ever since Israel started its attacks on Syria.

On 22 January, Israel carried out an airstrike near the city of Hama, killing a family of four, including two children.

==== February ====
On 3 February, Israeli Air Force launched an attack on Hezbollah positions in Quneitra Governorate, and other sites near Damascus International Airport.

On 11 February, unidentified drones targeted a weapons shipment at an illegal military crossing, near Al-Bukamal in the eastern Deir Ezzor Governorate.

On 15 February, Israeli airstrikes struck positions and warehouses, west and south-west of the capital Damascus, in the area of Damascus International Airport as well as Al-Kiswah and the headquarters of the Syrian Army's 4th Armoured Division. Nine pro-Iranian militiamen were killed in the airstrikes. The dead were all of the non-Syrian and non-Arab nationalities, and it is not known whether they were Afghans, Pakistanis or Iranians, as these militias are substantially deployed in the area near the Lebanese border.

On 28 February, Iran-related sites were targeted around Damascus in what Hebrew media outlets suggest was a response to an Iranian attack against an Israeli-owned vessel in the Gulf of Oman the previous week.

==== March ====
On 11 March, The Wall Street Journal reported that Israel had used weaponry including naval mines to target a dozen Iranian ships carrying oil or weapons to Syria in the past two years.

On 16 March, a Syrian military source claimed that Israel attacked Iranian weapon shipments near Damascus.

==== April ====
On 22 April, Syria fired an SA-5 surface-to-air missile in response to what it claims was an Israeli airstrike near Damascus. The missile reportedly landed close to Israel's nuclear reactor in Dimona, after Israel failed to intercept the missile. Israel retaliated by attacking a number of Syrian missile launchers, including the one that fired the projectile.

==== May ====
On 4 May, Israeli aircraft hit targets in northern Syria, killing one and wounding six.

On 5 May, Israeli forces attacked Hezbollah outposts near Quneitra on the Syrian ceasefire line in the Golan Heights.

==== June ====
On 8 June, Israeli airstrikes took place in southern and central Syria, causing damage.

==== July ====
On 19 July, Russian anti-aircraft systems in Syria intercepted a number of missiles launched by Israeli warplanes southeast of Aleppo. Senior Iranian IRGC and Hezbollah fighters were reportedly killed in the strikes.

On 20 July, Israeli airstrikes took place south of Aleppo. Syrian air defense systems were activated in response. Syrian media claimed a factory and research center were targeted.

On 22 July, Syrian air defenses intercepted Israeli missiles in the al Qusair area of Homs. Syrian state media reported some material damage but no casualties.

==== August ====
On 17 August, Syrian media reported two Israeli missiles were fired toward the town of Hader in the northern Quneitra countryside, located on the Syrian-controlled side of the Golan Heights. Britain-based Syrian Observatory for Human Rights said the strikes targeted an area where Iranian-backed fighters are based.

On 19 August, Syrian air defenses fired over ten anti-aircraft missiles against Israeli jets targeting sites belonging to Iran-backed militias in the Qalamoun mountains near the capital Damascus. The defense missiles fell on residential areas in the town of Qara, killing four Syrian civilians as a result. Another three people were reportedly injured as well.

==== September ====
On 3 September, Israeli aircraft carried out airstrikes against weapons development centers near Damascus used by Iranian-backed militias. A Syrian air defense missile that was fired at the aircraft traversed Israeli skies before exploding over the Mediterranean Sea off the coast of central Israel, without causing injuries or damage.

On 27 September, an Iranian-backed base in eastern Syria was struck by unidentified aircraft.

==== October ====
On 8 October, an Israeli airstrike targeted a drone depot at a T-4 base in central Syria, killing two foreign fighters and wounding others.

On 13 October, an Israeli airstrike targeted a communications tower and other sites near Palmyra in central Syria. At least one Syrian soldier was killed and three wounded. Iranian militias warned of a "harsh response." The Syrian Observatory for Human Rights said nine pro-government fighters were killed in the strike, four of them Syrians and five of undetermined nationality.

On 16 October, Syrian media reported that an Israeli sniper shot dead Syrian MP Midhat as-Saleh in the town of Ain al-Tinah. As-Saleh, who was previously jailed in Israel for security-related offenses for twelve years, was believed to be working with Iran to establish a front against Israel on the Golan ceasefire line.

On 20 October, the Al Tanf base in southern Syria was under attack by five Iranian suicide drones in retaliation for Israeli air strikes, no casualties were reported.

On 25 October, Israeli helicopters struck three Hezbollah-related targets on the outskirts of Madinat al-Baath and other locations in southern Syria, causing material damage but no casualties. According to Syrian media, two of the sites were observation posts used by Hezbollah, while the third target was a site next to a Syrian military facility that Israel has claimed was cooperating with Hezbollah.

On 30 October, five people were reportedly killed in a rare daytime Israeli strike outside Damascus, according to the Syrian Observatory for Human Rights. The strike was carried out with surface-to-surface missiles and targeted a shipment of weapons intended for Hezbollah that was making its way to Lebanon.

==== November ====
On 3 November, Syrian media reported an Israeli airstrike on a military post in the town of Zakiyah in the western Damascus countryside.

On 8 November, Israeli forces carried out strikes around Homs and Tartus in Western Syria. Syrian media reported injuries to two Syrian soldiers and material losses. The Syrian Observatory for Human Rights identified the targets as Iranian-controlled weapons caches.

On 10 November, an unidentified drone carried out strikes on Iranian-backed militias in the Bukamal region of eastern Syria close to the border with Iraq, destroying arms depots. It was not clear if the attack was carried out by American-led coalition forces or by Israel.

On 17 November, Israeli forces fired two missiles from the Golan Heights towards an empty warehouse near Damascus. No wounded were reported.

On 24 November, Israel struck a site in Homs in central Syria, killing two civilians and injuring a civilian and six soldiers.

==== December ====
On 6 December, according to Syrian media, an Israeli strike targeted a container yard at the Latakia port. A number of shipping containers caught on fire, but no casualties were reported.

On 16 December, Israeli jets bombed areas in southern Syria, killing one soldier and causing damage to unspecified sites.

On 28 December, Israeli airstrikes targeted the Latakia port again, causing massive damage to containers in the area.

=== 2022 ===
The Syrian Observatory of Human Rights documented 32 Israeli airstrikes and ground rocket attacks, during which Israel targeted several positions in Syria, destroying nearly 91 targets, including buildings, warehouses, headquarters, centres, and vehicles in 2022. These strikes killed one civilian and 89 combatants and injured 121 others.

==== January ====
On 31 January, Israel carried out airstrikes near Damascus, causing material damage.

==== February ====
On 8 February, rocket sirens sounded in and near Umm al-Fahm in northern Israel after an alleged Israeli airstrike near Damascus. The IDF confirmed that an anti-aircraft missile fired from Syria exploded mid-air and set off the sirens.

On 17 February, Israel attacked targets south of Damascus with a surface-to-surface missile, causing material damage but no casualties.

On 23 February, a number of Israeli surface-to-surface missiles were launched from the Golan towards areas near Madinat al-Baath and Rwihinah close to Israel's border, causing material damage.

On 24 February, three Syrian soldiers were killed during an Israeli airstrike near Damascus, hours after Israel dropped leaflets on Syrian army positions warning that they could be attacked for cooperating with Hezbollah.

==== March ====
On 7 March, two people were killed during an Israeli airstrike in the Damascus area. According to the Syrian army, the air defense system was activated "to deal with Israeli aggression."

==== April ====
On 9 April, Israel carried out daylight airstrikes on Syrian government-held positions. Syrian state media claimed its air defenses intercepted some of the incoming missiles over the Hama province.

On 14 and 27 April, Israel carried out airstrikes near Damascus.

==== May ====
On 11 May, Israel launched four missiles at a site in Quneitra in southwest Syria close to the border with Israel.

On 13 May, five people were killed and seven others injured during an alleged Israeli airstrike in Masyaf. The area, which is home to a facility belonging to the Scientific Studies and Research Center and thought to be used as a base for Iranian forces, has been repeatedly targeted in recent years in attacks attributed to Israel.

On 20 May, three Syrian soldiers were killed when Israel fired surface-to-surface missiles near Damascus, causing damage.

==== June ====
On 6 June, Israeli jets struck targets in the suburb of al-Kiswah south of Damascus and near the Damascus International Airport, causing damage to several sites. The al-Kiswah area has been bombed by Israel in the past for purportedly containing Iranian military bases.

On 10 June, Israeli warplanes carried out a series of strikes south of Damascus, causing material damage and at least one injured.

==== July ====
On 2 July, Israeli jets carried out a daytime airstrike at the town of al-Hamidiyah, south of Tartus.

On 6 July, a Syrian militant affiliated with Hezbollah and the Assad regime was killed by an Israeli drone strike in Quneitra.

On 22 July, Israeli fighter jets attacked sites belonging to the Syrian military and pro-Iranian militias near Damascus, killing three Syrian soldiers and wounding others. A temporary storage warehouse of the IRGC was also targeted.

==== August ====
On 14 August, Israeli jets struck areas near Tartus and Damascus, killing three Syrian soldiers and wounding another three.

On 25 August, Israel carried out airstrikes in northwestern Syria, an area thought to be used by Iranian forces that has been repeatedly attacked in recent years. Two civilians were injured. Photos and videos showed large plumes of smoke and prolonged secondary explosions at the targeted sites. The Syrian Observatory for Human Rights reported that the airstrike in Masyaf destroyed a warehouse containing over 1,000 Iranian-made missiles.

On 31 August, Israel was accused by Syria of carrying out two consecutive airstrikes against the Aleppo International Airport and near the capital Damascus. A sanctioned Iranian cargo plane reportedly landed at the Aleppo airport earlier in the day.

==== September ====
On 6 September, Israeli jets struck Aleppo International Airport, taking it out of service for the second time in less than a week.

On 17 September, Israeli aircraft struck the Damascus International Airport and other positions south of the Syrian capital, causing material damage and killing five soldiers, including two members of Iranian-backed militias.

==== October ====
On 21 October, an Israeli airstrike destroyed an Iranian-backed drone manufacturing and weapons storage site at the Dimas military airport near the Lebanese border.

On 24 October, daytime Israeli airstrikes struck Damascus, Syrian state media reported. There was material damage and one Syrian soldier was injured.

On 27 October, Israeli missiles targeted sites close to Damascus, causing material damage.

==== November ====
On 9 November, Israeli forces allegedly struck a convoy carrying fuel or weapons destined for Lebanon as they crossed into Syria from Iraq at the al-Qaim border crossing, killing at least ten people, including a number of Iranian fighters.

On 13 November, Israeli airstrikes targeted a runway at the Shayrat Airbase in northeastern Syria, which military sources told Reuters was recently used by the Iranian airforce.

On 19 November, Israeli airstrikes targeted central and coastal regions of Syria, killing four soldiers and wounding one.

==== December ====
On 19 December, Israeli strikes in the Damascus area killed three non-Syrian and two Iranian-backed Syrian fighters.

=== 2023 ===
==== January ====
On 1 January, Israeli air forces struck the Damascus International airport, putting it out of service and killing three Syrian soldiers and two non-Syrian fighters. On 29 January, unidentified aircraft attacked a convoy of Iranian trucks at the al-Qaim crossing on the Syria-Iraq border. The following day another airstrike targeted a truck near the Syria-Iraq border that was carrying weapons and ammunition for Iranian militias.

==== February ====
On 18 February, an Israeli airstrike in Damascus left four civilians and a soldier killed, and 15 wounded.

==== March ====
On 7 March, Israeli air forces attacked the Aleppo airport, causing it to shut down due to damage, though no casualties were reported.

On 12 March, the city of Masyaf in Western Syria was struck by daytime Israeli airstrikes. Three soldiers were injured.

On 22 March, Israel conducted airstrikes against several Iran-linked targets in Syria, including in Damascus, the Aleppo international airport and the Latakia area.

On 29 March, Israel was accused of carrying out several airstrikes against army positions in the Al-Midan neighborhood of Damascus, injuring two Syrian soldiers and causing some material damage.

On 31 March, an Israeli strike near Damascus killed an IRGC officer. Two days later another IRGC member died of injuries sustained in the strike. It was speculated that the Israeli attack was a response to last month's suspected Hezbollah bombing near Megiddo in northern Israel that left a man seriously injured, which is believed to have been carried out by a terrorist who crossed the Lebanon border fence using a ladder. The terrorist was shot dead while trying to return to Lebanon.

==== April ====
On 1 April, Israeli airstrikes near Homs injured five soldiers.

On 2 April, an unidentified aircraft—likely of Iranian origin—that crossed into Israeli airspace from Syria was shot down by Israeli helicopters and planes. Shortly after, Syrian media reported explosions at an airport near Damascus, but did not blame Israel.

On 4 April, Israeli airstrikes near Damascus killed two Syrian civilians.

On 9 April, Israel conducted airstrikes in the Damascus area, UAV strikes against rocket launchers and fired artillery shells in response to six rockets launched toward the Golan Heights overnight. The sites targeted by the Israeli strikes included a military compound belonging to the Syrian Army's 4th Division, radar sites and artillery sites used by the Syrian military.

On 24 April, Israeli artillery shelled a number of positions near Quneitra where Iranian and Hezbollah-affiliated militias are known to be stationed.

On 29 April, Israel carried out airstrikes near the city of Homs in Western Syria, wounding three.

==== May ====
On 1 May, Israeli aircraft attacked the Aleppo airport, killing a soldier and wounding seven (five soldiers and two civilians). The airport was forced to shut down. It was later reported that the targeted sites were Iranian weapon factories operating in Syria secretly.

On 28 May, Israeli fighter jets carried out airstrikes around Damascus, causing damage but no injuries.

==== June ====
On 14 June, Israel struck military warehouses belonging to Iranian militias near the Damascus airport and an area southwest of the Syrian capital.

==== July ====
On 2 July, Israel carried out airstrikes near the city of Homs, causing unspecified "material losses". An anti-aircraft missile launched from Syria exploded over Israeli airspace, causing shrapnel to fall in the southern city of Rahat. Later Israeli jets attacked the anti-aircraft battery behind the launch and struck "additional targets in the area."

On 5 July, Israeli aircraft targeted warehouses near Damascus storing "advanced Iranian weapons."

On 18 July, two Syrian soldiers were injured after Israeli aircraft struck sites in the Damascus area.

==== August ====
On 6 August, four Syrian soldiers were killed and another four wounded in Israeli airstrikes around Damascus. Material damage was also reported.

On 21 August, Israeli jets carried out airstrikes on targets around Damascus, wounding a soldier and causing material damage.

On 28 August, Israel launched an airstrike against the Aleppo international airport, putting it out of service.

==== September ====
On 13 September, an Israeli strike in Tartus killed at least two Syrian soldiers and injured another six. Another Israeli strike in the Hama area caused material damage.

==== October ====
On 1 October, Israel reportedly carried out airstrikes near Damascus against an Iranian weapons shipment that was heading to Lebanon.

On 3 October, Israel reportedly carried out airstrikes in the Deir ez-Zor province in eastern Syria, wounding at least two soldiers and causing material damage.

On 12 October, Israel was reported to have attacked runways at the two international airports of Aleppo and Damascus, making an Iranian Mahan Air flight that was about to land in Syria turn back to Tehran. According to some reports, two flights were diverted, one flight was carrying Iran Foreign Minister Amir-Abdollahian and IRGC members, while the other carried 10 tons of missiles.

On 14 October, an Israeli airstrike put Aleppo airport out of service, according to the Syrian defense ministry.

On 22 October, Israeli aircraft struck the Aleppo and Damascus airports, knocking both out of service. Two Syrian workers from the meteorology service based in Damascus airport were killed.

On 25 October, Israeli forces struck several Syrian military targets after rockets were fired from Syria toward Israeli communities in the Golan Heights, killing eight Syrian soldiers and wounding another seven in the Daraa area. Later in the day, Israeli fighter jets targeted the Aleppo International Airport once again, knocking it out of service

==== November ====
On 8 November, Israeli and US forces reportedly carried out separate airstrikes against Iranian-backed militias in Syria, killing a total of 12 fighters.

After a drone launched from Syrian territory crashed into a school in Eilat on 9 November, Israel carried out airstrikes in Syria.

On 16 November, Israeli strikes targeted the town of Sayyida Zeinab near Damascus, where Iran-backed militias have a heavy presence.

On 22 November, Syria accused Israel of carrying out two airstrikes near Damascus. One of the missiles were downed by Syrian air defenses, and the other caused an unspecified amount of damage. Two people who allegedly worked with Hezbollah were killed in the strike.

On 22 November, Israeli warplanes fired two missiles from the Golan Heights at a site near Damascus, causing material damage but no injuries, according to Syrian media.

On 26 November, Syrian media reported Israeli airstrikes on Damascus International Airport and other targets near the capital.

==== December ====
On 2 December, two officers from the Islamic Revolutionary Guard Corps were killed in alleged Israeli airstrikes near Damascus. The strikes reportedly came from the direction of the Golan Heights, according to Syrian state news agency, most of the missiles were shot down.

On 8 December, the son of a senior Hezbollah leader and four others were killed in an Israeli airstrike in southern Syria.

On 10 December, eight people were injured and damage was reported from Israeli airstrikes around Damascus. A Syrian military source claimed that the country's air defenses shot down some of the Israeli missiles. Strikes on two Hezbollah sites in Sayyida Zeinab and a "radar battalion" killed two of its members and two other Syrians.

On 17 December, two Syrian soldiers were injured from Israeli missiles launched from the Golan Heights. Some of the missiles which targeted areas around Damascus were shot down by air defenses.

On 20 December, four rockets were fired from Syria at the Israeli-occupied Golan Heights, setting off sirens in Mas'ade and Ein Qiniyye. The IDF shelled the source of the fire and targeted a Syrian Army position in response.

On 25 December, Sayyed Razi Mousavi, a brigadier general in the IRGC, was killed in an Israeli airstrike in Sayyida Zeinab. Mousavi was in charge of coordinating Iran's alliance with Syria and was reported as close to Qassem Soleimani. According to the Syrian opposition, he was killed in a farm which acted as a Hezbollah office.

On 28 December, a series of purported Israeli strikes were conducted in southern Syria and the area around Damascus. It was reported that the aim of the strikes were air defense installation. In one instance a Syrian Army radar site was targeted in Tal al-Sahn, near the Jordanian border. Saudi media later reported that eleven IRGC leaders were killed that day in an airstrike targeting the Damascus International Airport. IRGC spokesman denied these reports.

On 30 December, Six Iran backed militants were killed, including four from Hezbollah, in three overnights strikes on the Syrian-Iraqi border. According to Syrian opposition, the strikes targeted a convoy and a weapons warehouse. Later that day, the Aleppo International Airport was targeted in an Israeli strike, killing three.

=== 2024 ===
Since the start of the Gaza war, the frequency of Israeli attacks have increased, while also becoming deadlier.

It was reported that Israel has abandoned the previous "rules of the game" and no longer provides warning shots before attacking. This resulted in the death of 19 Hezbollah members in Syria since the start of the war.

==== January ====
On 8 January, an Israeli strike killed Hassan Hakashah, a central member of Hamas in Syria that was in charge of rocket attacks against Israel. The assassination occurred in Beit Jinn.

On 15 January, According to Syrian media and SOHR, Israel has attacked Iranian-linked targets in Aleppo, and explosions were heard in the vicinity of the airport.

On 20 January, five IRGC members including senior generals were killed in a strike in Mezzeh. Among the dead are the head of the Quds Force intelligence in Syria and his deputy.

On 29 January, two people were killed during an alleged Israeli strike against IRGC operational headquarters on the outskirts of Damascus.

==== February ====
On 1 February, a member of Iran's Revolutionary Guards, Saeed Alidadi, was killed in a suspected Israeli air strike near Damascus, marking the second such attack against Tehran's forces in Syria within weeks.

On 6 February, Israel attacked the Shuyrat Airbase and other sites near the city of Homs. According to the Syrian Observatory for Human Rights, ten people were killed, including six civilians and two Hezbollah fighters.

On 10 February, Israeli airstrikes allegedly hit several sites on the outskirts of Damascus, causing material damage. The Syrian Observatory for Human Rights reported that three people were killed and they could have been "non-Syrian nationals", though it could not immediately confirm whether the dead were fighters.

On 21 February, an Israeli aistrike on a residential area of Damascus killed at least two people, according to Syrian media.

On 25 February, an Israeli strike killed two Hezbollah militants on a truck outside Qusayr, a city south of Homs near the border with northern Lebanon.

On 28 February, Israeli strikes caused damage to pro-Iranian strongholds near Damascus.

==== March ====
On 17 March, Israeli airstrikes hit several sites in southern Syria, causing material damage and wounding a soldier. The Syrian Observatory for Human Rights reported the strikes also hit two military sites in the Qalamoun mountains northeast of Damascus, an area where Hezbollah operates. One of the targets was a weapons shipment, the observatory said.

On 19 March, Syria's state news agency said Israel struck a number of targets in the Damascus countryside, resulting in material losses.

On 26 March, the Israeli air force carried out airstrikes in the Deir Ezzor and al-Bukamal areas, close to eastern Syria's border with Iraq, targeting Iranian assets and operatives involved in a recent plot to smuggle advanced arms to West Bank terrorists. More than 15 people were reportedly killed.

On 28 March, Syrian state media reported Israeli aircraft struck a building in the Damascus area, injuring two and causing material damage.

On 29 March, an Israeli airstrike targeting Aleppo airport killed 38 Syrian soldiers, 7 Hezbollah fighters and 7 militiamen. It is the single deadliest Israeli attack on Syria since 2021.

On 31 March, two civilians were injured in Israeli strikes on the outskirts of Damascus.

==== April ====
On 1 April, an Israeli airstrike from the direction of the Golan Heights region destroyed the Iranian consulate in the capital of Syria, Damascus. Syrian authorities said that the strike "destroyed the entire building, killing and injuring everyone inside". Iranian state media reported that a senior Quds force commander of the Islamic Revolutionary Guard Corps was also killed in the attack.

During the Iranian strikes against Israel on 13 and 14 April, Iran launched ballistic missiles and drones at Israeli-occupied Syrian Golan Heights alongside Hezbollah.

==== May ====
On 2 May, eight Syrian soldiers were wounded and material losses were caused during an alleged Israeli airstrike targeting a building operated by the security forces on the outskirts of Damascus.

On 29 May, Israeli airstrikes targeted a site in Baniyas and another in Furqlus in central Syria, which resulted in the wounding of ten people in addition to killing a girl, according to Syrian state media. In addition, three Syrian fighters working with Hezbollah were killed during the attack on central Syria, according to SOHR.

==== June ====
On 3 June, at 12:20 a.m., an Israeli airstrike hit a pro-Iranian militia site in the Hayyan area north of Aleppo, which initially led to 12 deaths and material losses, according to SOHR. Afterwards, it was reported that 16 militants were killed including a prominent leader in the IRGC, Saeed Abiyar.

==== September ====
On 8 September, Israeli commandos raided an underground facility near Masyaf used by Iran and Hezbollah to build precision-guided missiles.

On 27 September 2024, Israeli forces struck the Lebanon-Syria border, killing five Syrian soldiers.

On 30 September, several people including a state television presenter were killed in an Israeli strike on Damascus.

==== October ====
On 8 October an Israeli airstrike on Damascus killed 13 people.

On 20 October, a guided missile attack on a car killed two people near the Golden Mazzeh hotel in Damascus.

On 31 October, SANA reported that Israeli strikes hit a number of residential buildings in Al-Qusayr, damaging its industrial zone and killing 10 people, including civilians. The IDF said that it struck Hezbollah command centers and weapon depots.

==== November ====
On 14 November, an Israeli strike on a residential building in Mazzeh and another Israeli strike on a residential building in Qudsaya killed 23 people including seven civilians. Israeli Army Radio said that the strikes targeted assets and headquarters of PIJ. PIJ confirmed the death of two of its leaders and a group of its cadres.

On 20 November, Israeli strikes in Palmyra killed 92 Iran-backed fighters, including four from Hezbollah, and injured 21 others including seven civilians.

== See also ==
- Iran–Israel proxy conflict
- Israeli–Syrian ceasefire line incidents during the Syrian civil war
- Syria in the 2026 Iran war
