= Lebanon in the Syrian civil war =

Lebanon's role in the Syrian Civil War has been limited, compared to the role of other regional and international actors. While the Lebanese Republic has not been officially involved in the conflict, it has been greatly affected by it and some Lebanese factors have taken an active role in the Syrian War and its spillover into Lebanon.

During the war, conflicting statements were issued by Lebanese politicians in regard to the Syrian Civil War, though in general the Lebanese Republic remained neutral in the conflict. Between 2011 and 2017, fighting from the Syrian Civil War spilled over into Lebanon as opponents and supporters of the Syrian rebels travelled to Lebanon to fight and attack each other on Lebanese soil.

Hezbollah involvement in the Syrian Civil War has been substantial since the beginning of the armed insurgency phase of the Syrian Civil War, and turned into active support and troop deployment from 2012 onwards. By 2014, Hezbollah had become actively involved in support of Syrian Ba'athist Government forces across Syria. Hezbollah deployed several thousand fighters in Syria and by 2015 lost up to 1500 fighters in combat.

Since 2011, Lebanon has absorbed Syrian refugees and provided humanitarian aid too. According to the UNHCR, there were over 1 million Syrian refugees who had been registered in Lebanon in 2016.

== Background ==
Lebanon had traditionally been seen by Syria as part of the region of Syria: under the Ottoman Empire, Lebanon and Syria were included within one administrative entity. Following World War I, the League of Nations Mandate partitioned Ottoman Greater Syria under French control, eventually leading to the creation of nation-states Lebanon and Syria. Relations between the two countries had been strained, especially with the 29-year Syrian Occupation of Lebanon, accusations of Syrian intervention within Lebanese politics before and after withdrawal of Syrian troops from Lebanon, and suspicions of Syria assassinating Lebanese political figures like former prime minister Rafic Hariri.

Syria officially recognized Lebanon's sovereignty in 2008. Lebanon-Syria relations were officially established in October 2008 when Syrian President Bashar al-Assad issued a decree to establish diplomatic relations with Lebanon for the first time since both countries gained independence from France in 1943.

== Official Lebanese standpoint ==
During the war, conflicting statements were issued by Lebanese politicians in regard to the Syrian Civil War, though in general the Lebanese Republic remained neutral in the conflict. The Hezbollah and Amal affiliated politicians and ministers generally stated in support to the Syrian Ba'athist government, whereas other parties criticized it. Since 2012, Hezbollah actively intervened in the Syrian War, supporting the Ba'athist forces.

== Absorption of Syrian refugees and humanitarian aid ==
Since 2011, Lebanon has absorbed Syrian refugees and provided humanitarian aid too. According to the UNHCR, there were over 1 million Syrian refugees who had been registered in Lebanon in 2016. Nevertheless, this figure is likely largely underestimated since the UNHCR has stopped registering new Syrian refugees since May 2015 and it doesn't include individuals awaiting to be registered. Hence, precise figures of the number of Syrian people in Lebanon don't exist currently. Recent estimates were as high as 1,500,000 people.

== Border incidents and spillover ==
Between 2011 and 2017, fighting from the Syrian Civil War spilled over into Lebanon as opponents and supporters of the Syrian rebels travelled to Lebanon to fight and attack each other on Lebanese soil. The Syrian conflict has been described as having stoked a "resurgence of sectarian violence in Lebanon", with many of Lebanon's Sunni Muslims supporting the rebels in Syria, while many Shi'ites have supported Assad, whose Alawite minority is usually described as an offshoot of Shi'a Islam. Killings, unrest, and kidnappings of foreign citizens across Lebanon resulted.

Pro-Syrian forces fought against opposition to the al-Assad presidency in the Bab al-Tabbaneh, Jabal Mohsen clashes, leading to the deaths of three people and more injuries. Tripoli has a majority Sunni Muslim population but also secular pro-Assad Alawites. One Sunni cleric alleged that the Syrian president sent forces into Tripoli to introduce unrest within the region. March 2012 discussions on the national level include concerns that toppling the al-Assad government would result in regional instability for Lebanon and Iraq.

== Hezbollah involvement in the Syrian War ==
Hezbollah involvement in the Syrian Civil War has been substantial since the beginning of armed insurgency phase of the Syrian Civil War, and turned into active support and troop deployment from 2012 onwards. By 2014, Hezbollah involvement begun to turn steady in support of Syrian Ba'athist Government forces across Syria. Hezbollah deployed several thousand fighters in Syria and by 2015 lost up to 1500 fighters in combat. Hezbollah has also been very active to prevent rebel penetration from Syria to Lebanon, being one of the most active forces in the Syrian Civil War spillover in Lebanon.

In the past, Hezbollah has served a strategic arm of Iran in the region, allegedly playing a key role in the Iran–Israel and Iran–Saudi Arabia proxy conflicts in the middle east. In a number of occasions, Hezbollah weapon convoys in Syria and Syrian-Lebanese border areas were attacked, with Israel being the main suspected party behind most such attacks, though Israel did not claim responsibility except for the March 2017 Israel–Syria incident. Hezbollah convoys have also been attacked by Syrian rebel factions, most notably the Al-Nusra Front.

== See also ==
- Humanitarian aid during the Syrian Civil War
