= November 2024 Batroun raid =

Israeli naval commando raid in Lebanon

Batroun raid
- Part of the 2024 Israeli invasion of Lebanon during the Israel–Hezbollah conflict (2023–2024)
- CCTV footage of military personnel taking Amhaz away
- Operational scope: Kidnapping of Imad Amhaz, an alleged Hezbollah naval operative
- Location: Batroun, Lebanon; 34°15′0″N 35°39′0″E
- Target: Hezbollah (per IDF)
- Date: 2 November 2024
- Executed by: Israel Defense Forces: Israeli Navy
- Outcome: Successful kidnapping of Imad Amhaz by the IDF
- Location within Lebanon

On 2 November 2024, Israeli naval commando unit Shayetet 13 raided Batroun in northern Lebanon, kidnapped a Lebanese citizen and left the area in a speedboat. The Israel Defense Forces stated the target was a senior Hezbollah operative who was taken to Israel for questioning by military intelligence. The IDF identified him as Imad Ahmaz, whom it said was responsible for Hezbollah's naval operations.

== Raid ==
At dawn on 2 November 2024, an Israeli naval force consisting of the Shayetet 13 elite commando unit landed in Batroun, raided a chalet, and kidnapped a Lebanese citizen, before returning to Israel in a speedboat. According to local media reports, the raid was conducted by more than 25 armed men. Israel claimed to have identified the abducted man as Imad Amhaz, who it said was responsible for Hezbollah's naval operations. Israel said that he is now being interrogated by Unit 504. CCTV footage showed a person being led away by more than a dozen armed men. Lebanon's minister of public works, Ali Hamieh, said that the abducted man was a civilian ship captain taking a course at a maritime institute in Batroun, where he rented a chalet. He also said the abduction could be a violation of United Nations Security Council Resolution 1701.

UNIFIL spokesperson Kandice Ardiel denied allegations by some local media reports that UNIFIL assisted the Israeli naval force in its operation.

== Target ==
Imad Amhaz is a sea captain of civilian and commercial ships and was receiving his education at a civilian institute. He was not a member of the Lebanese Navy. Israel said he assisted in smuggling naval weapons from Iran through Syria to Lebanon. After the kidnapping, Lebanese security forces discovered that Emad had about ten SIM cards and passports of different countries.

Amhaz' father denied accusations of his son's ties to Hezbollah stating that "Imad is a civilian maritime captain" in a Facebook post.

== Reactions ==
- Hezbollah: Hezbollah called the incident a "Zionist aggression in the Batroun area", without confirming one of its member's capture.
- Lebanon: Lebanese prime minister Najib Mikati said he ordered the government to file a complaint to the United Nations Security Council over the kidnapping.
- Israel: The Israeli military stated that "the operative has been transferred to Israeli territory and is currently being investigated", without naming them.
