= Al-Qitaa =

Al-Qitaa القطعة
- Town
- Location in Syria
- Coordinates: 34°39′13″N 40°47′58″E
- Country: Syria
- Governorate: Deir ez-Zor
- District: Abu Kamal
- Subdistrict: al-Jalaa

Population (2004)
  - Total: 8,251
- Time zone: UTC+2 (EET)
  - Summer (DST): UTC+3 (EEST)
- City Qrya Pcode: C5179

Al-Qitaa (Arabic: القطعة), also known as Al-Majawdeh (Arabic: المجاودة), is a Syrian town located in Abu Kamal District, Deir ez-Zor. According to the Syria Central Bureau of Statistics (CBS), Al-Qitaa had a population of 8,251 in the 2004 census.
