= Tulul al-Humur =

Tulul al-Humur تلول الحمر
- Village
- Location in Syria
- Coordinates: 35°6′40″N 37°8′42″E
- Country: Syria
- Governorate: Hama
- District: Salamiyah
- Subdistrict: Salamiyah

Population (2004)
  - Total: 989
- Time zone: UTC+3 (AST)
- City Qrya Pcode: C3222

Tulul al-Humur (Arabic: تلول الحمر) is a Syrian village located in Salamiyah Subdistrict in Salamiyah District, Hama. According to the Syria Central Bureau of Statistics (CBS), Tulul al-Humur had a population of 989 in the 2004 census.
