= Syria missile strikes (September 2018) =

Israeli strikes during the Syrian Civil War

- Part of Iran–Israel conflict, and Russian military intervention in the Syrian civil war
- Location: Latakia, Tartus and Homs Governorates, Syria
- Planned by: Israel
- Date: 17 September 2018
- Executed by: Israeli Air Force
- Casualties: 2 Syrian soldiers killed (Russia) 15 Russian servicemen killed About 10 injured

On 17 September 2018, the Israeli Air Force (IAF) conducted missile strikes against multiple targets in government-controlled western Syria. Syrian air defences responded to the Israeli fighter jets, accidentally shooting a Russian military Il-20, killing 15 crew aboard. Russia blamed Israel for the loss of its plane, accusing the IAF of "hiding behind the Russian aircraft", thereby putting it in the line of fire. The Israel Defense Forces acknowledged striking a Syrian weapons facility, and expressed sorrow for the loss of lives due to Syrian fire. The strikes occurred a few hours after a Russo-Turkish agreement to create a demilitarized zone around Idlib Governorate was achieved, which postponed an imminent offensive operation by Syria's forces and its allies.

== Airstrikes ==
At approximately 22:00 (local time), a large number of missiles struck the Latakia, Tartus and Homs governorates of western Syria. According to the Russian MoD's detailed report presented on 23 September, the attack began at 21:40 and involved four F-16 fighter jets launching GBU-39 bombs at industrial sites in Latakia.

Missiles hit the Institute of Technological Industries, a subsidiary of the Syrian Ministry of Defense, in the outskirts of Latakia; the Syrian Observatory for Human Rights reported that the missiles targeted ammunition depots there. Two people were killed and ten injured. Following the strikes, released satellite images showed a destroyed ammunition warehouse.

== Russian aircraft shot down ==
During Israel's attack — at 22:02:45, according to the Russian defence ministry — an Il-20 ELINT reconnaissance plane returning to Khmeimim Air Base, with 15 Russian servicemen on board, was hit by a Syrian S-200 surface-to-air missile 35 km from the Syrian coast. The Russian military received a one-minute warning prior to the attack, which it said was not enough time to get the Il-20 out of the way. The plane's sign disappeared from radars at 22:07. Russian officials initially said that the French frigate Auvergne launched missiles during the strikes in addition to those fired from the Israeli F-16s. France denied any involvement.

The following day, Russia's defence minister Sergey Shoygu said the Russian plane had been hit by Syrian anti-aircraft fire, but, nevertheless, blamed Israel's military for the accident. According to Russia, Israeli planes "hid behind" the Russian plane, placing it in the line of Syrian anti-aircraft fire. The Russian military also said it only received one minute's warning from Israel about the impending missile strikes and the four Israeli F-16 jets that conducted the strikes deliberately used the Russian plane as cover to allow them to approach their targets on the ground without being hit by Syrian fire. President Vladimir Putin later said that the MoD's statement on the incident had been fully cleared with him.

According to the Israeli military, the Israeli jets were already in Israeli airspace when the Il-20 was shot down. According to Israel, the Syrian government is fully responsible for the missile fire, however Israel offered its condolences to Russia for the death of the crew. According to the IDF spokesperson "The Syrian anti-aircraft batteries fired indiscriminately and, from what we understand, did not bother to ensure that no Russian planes were in the air", further adding that "The extensive and inaccurate Syrian anti-aircraft missile fire caused the Russian plane to be hit".

The Israeli investigation, presented to Russian officials as well, concluded that a number of different Syrian SAM batteries fired dozens of missiles over a time span of approximately 40 minutes, well after the Israeli jets returned to their base. According to the Israeli investigation, Syrian missile fire was towards multiple directions – east inland, west to the sea, and southwards to Lebanon. According to the Israeli investigation, such Syrian use of "wild" missile fire of dozens of missiles, has become prevalent since the shoot-down of an Israeli F-16I in February 2018 and peaked in Operation House of Cards where some 170 missiles were launched at Israeli jets.

On 18 September, Israel's prime minister Benjamin Netanyahu expressed regret and told Russian president Vladimir Putin that Syrian forces were to blame for the downing. Putin described the incident as a "tragic chance events," appearing to downplay tensions with Israel.

On 23 September 2018, the Russian defence ministry's spokesman Igor Konashenkov re-affirmed the ministry's earlier accusations of the Israeli military as the ″sole" culprit of the accident and presented a detailed account of the chain of events that led to the shootdown; he noted that all the Israeli fighter jets remained off the coast of Latakia after the shootdown and left the area at 22:40.

== Aftermath ==
On 18 September, Russia summoned the Israeli envoy to Moscow to account for the incident.

On 24 September, defense minister Sergei Shoigu said that within two weeks, the Syrian army would receive S-300 air-defense missile systems to strengthen Syria's combat air defence capabilities. He added that the previous cancellation of the contract for S-300 delivery in 2013 had been due to Israel's request but following the downing of a Russian Ilyushin Il-20 aircraft in Syria the situation had changed. The S-300 would have modern IFF systems, which will prevent the missiles from targeting Russian aircraft. He also announced a few other military measures Russia would undertake to protect Russian service members in Syria. Russian president Vladimir Putin informed Syrian president Bashar Assad of the planned delivery in a telephone conversation the same day.

== See also ==
- List of accidents and incidents involving military aircraft (2010–present)
- List of accidents and incidents involving the Ilyushin Il-18
- List of aviation shootdowns and accidents during the Syrian Civil War
- List of the Israel Defense Forces operations
- Russia and the Iran–Israel proxy conflict
- Timeline of the Syrian Civil War (September–December 2018)
- Syria missile strikes (August 2019)
- 2024 Israeli invasion of Syria
