= Israeli–Syrian ceasefire line incidents during the Syrian civil war =

Incidents at the Israel–Syria ceasefire line since 2011

Israeli–Syrian ceasefire line incidents during the Syrian Civil War
- Part of Spillover of the Syrian civil war and Iran–Israel conflict during the Syrian civil war
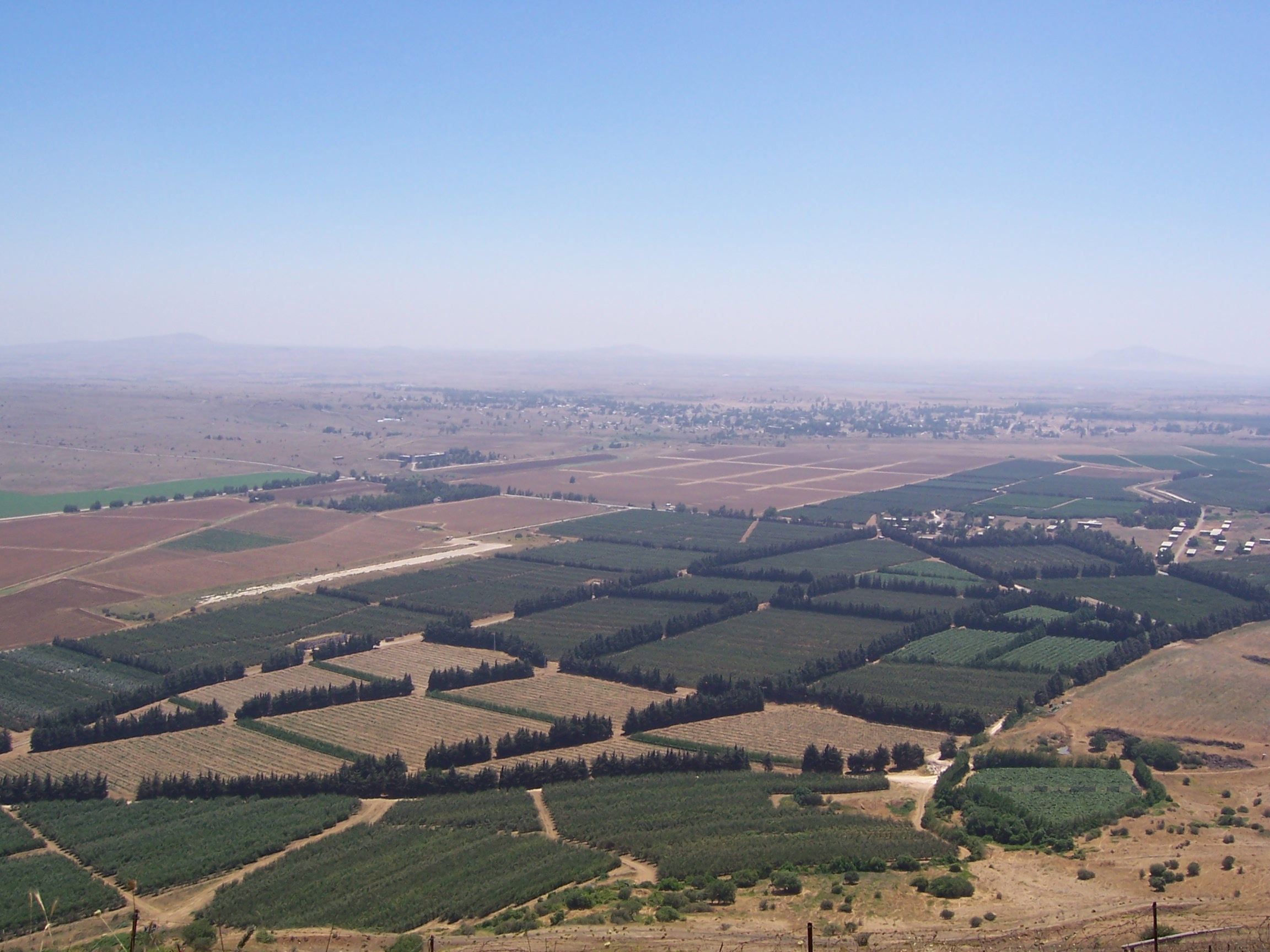
- Ceasefire line between Syrian-controlled territory and the Israeli-occupied portion of the Golan Heights in 2004. The white buildings to the right belong to UN peacekeepers. For a war map of the current situation in Quneitra, see here.
| Date | 25 September 2012 – present (14 years, 1 week and 4 days) |
| Location | Golan Heights |
| Result | Ongoing; Israel invades Syria after the fall of Assad |

Belligerents
| Israel | Axis of Resistance (until 8 December 2024): Ba'athist Syria; Iran; Hezbollah; Syria (from 8 December 2024) | (Islamic State) ISIL (until 2018); Khalid ibn al-Walid Army |

Commanders and leaders
| (Israel) Benjamin Netanyahu (Israel) Naftali Bennett (2021–2022) (Israel) Yair Lapid (2022) | (Ba'athist Syria) Bashar al-Assad (until 2024); (Ba'athist Syria) Ali Mahmoud Abbas (2022–2024); (Iran) Ali Khamenei; (Iran) Hassan Rouhani (2013–2021); (Iran) Ebrahim Raisi (2021–2024); (Iran) Ataollah Salehi (until 2017); (Iran) Abdolrahim Mousavi (2017–2024); (Iran) Mohammad Ali Jafari (until 2019); (Iran) Hossein Salami (2019–2024); (Hezbollah) Naim Qassem; (Hezbollah) Hassan Nasrallah (2012–2024) X; (Hezbollah) Jihad Mughniyah (until 2015) X; (Hezbollah) Mohamad Issa (until 2015) X; Ahmed al-Sharaa; Murhaf Abu Qasra | (Islamic State) Abu Hashim al-Hamawi |

Casualties and losses
| Israel Defence Forces: 3 soldiers killed (Note: 4 October 2024: 2 in an Iraqi militia drone strike 1 May 2025: 1 in an accident); 42 soldiers wounded (Note: 9 October 2013: 2 injured; 14 March 2014: 3 injured; 18 March 2014: 4 injured; 27 August 2014: 1 injured; 8 September 2014: 1 injured; 23 July 2015: 2 injured; 10 February 2018: 2 injured 4 October 2024: 24 wounded 1 May 2025: 3 injured); Equipment losses: 1 F-16 shot down; 2–3 Skylark drones lost | Axis of Resistance: 244–512 killed; By belligerents: (Ba'athist Syria) 124–392 killed, 138 wounded; (Iran) 41 killed; 53 killed, 8 captured; 26 other militiamen killed; Equipment losses: 2 Sukhoi fighter jets shot down; 7 drones shot down (Note: 1 Yasir; 1 Saegheh; 1 Ababil; 4 unspecified) | (Islamic State) 35 killed |
- (Israel) 1 Israeli civilian killed and 5 injured (Ba'athist Syria) 10–13 Syrian civilians killed and 6 injured (Syria) 3 Syrian Palestinians killed and 5 injured (Syrian opposition) 1 Syrian rebel killed 6 unidentified militants killed on Syrian-controlled side

Several incidents have taken place on the Israeli–Syrian ceasefire line during the Syrian Civil War, straining the relations between the countries. The incidents are considered a spillover of the Quneitra Governorate clashes since 2012 and later incidents between Syrian Army and the rebels, ongoing on the Syrian-controlled side of the Golan and the Golan Neutral Zone and the Hezbollah involvement in the Syrian Civil War. Through the incidents, which began in late 2012, as of mid-2014, one Israeli civilian was killed and at least 4 soldiers wounded; on the Syrian-controlled side, it is estimated that at least ten soldiers were killed, as well as two unidentified militants, who were identified near Ein Zivan on Golan Heights.

== Timeline ==
| Date | Events | Casualties |
|---|---|---|
| 25 September 2012 | El Rom, Golan Heights: Several errant mortar shells fired by the Syrian army fell in an agricultural land. | |
| 26 September 2012 | El Rom, Golan Heights: A mortar shell fired from Syrian landed in the same location that was hit in the previous day. | |
| 5 November 2012 | Golan Heights: An IDF jeep was hit by a bullet from Syria near the Syria-Israel border. No one was injured in the incident, but the vehicle was damaged. An IDF source said that it was errant fire by Syrian rebels. | |
| 8 November 2012 | Alonei HaBashan, Golan Heights: three mortar shells hit the area. As part of its deployment, Israel deployed obstacles in the border area and reinforced the border fence. Israeli-Druze Deputy Minister, Ayoob Kara, said that opposition elements in Syria acknowledged their responsibility for the mortar shells that fell in the Golan Heights and expressed regret over the incident. | |
| 11 November 2012 | Tel Hazeka, Golan Heights: A stray mortar shell from Syria's Quneitra Governorate landed near an Israeli military outpost. (Ba'athist Syria) Quneitra Governorate: Israel responded with a "warning shot" by firing a single Tamuz anti-tank missile and released a statement warning further retaliation if the attacks persist. The FSA issued a statement, claiming that Israel hit FSA forces that were closing in on Damascus forces and negotiating their surrender, and warned against any further interference in the Syrian conflict in favor of Assad's regime. | |
| 12 November 2012 | Tel Hazeka, Golan Heights: A stray mortar shell from Syria's Quneitra Governorate landed near an Israeli military outpost. (Ba'athist Syria) Quneitra Governorate: IDF's tanks fired on two D-3 mortar launchers belonging to the Syrian army, and confirmed a direct hit on the source of the fire. | |
| 17 November 2012 | Tel Hazeka, Golan Heights: Syrian Army fire hit an IDF patrol near the DMZ, damaging one jeep; no injuries were reported. (Ba'athist Syria) Quneitra Governorate: IDF fired artillery at the Syrian post in response. Israel confirmed a direct hit on the source of fire and said that Syrian soldiers may have been killed by the incident. Golan Heights: The Syrian Army retaliated by firing an additional mortar shell that landed in the demilitarized zone. | |
| 20 November 2012 | Tel Hazeka, Golan Heights: An IDF jeep near a military outpost was hit by stray bullets fired from Syria. No Injuries occurred and the IDF did not retaliate. | |
| 25 November 2012 | Golan Heights: Clashes between rebels and the Syrian army resulted in stray bullets striking near an IDF vehicle driving along the DMZ. No injuries or damage were reported, and Israel did not retaliate. | |
| 30 January 2013 | (Ba'athist Syria) Jamraya, Rif Dimashq: Israeli warplanes attacked the military research facility of the Syrian Scientific Studies and Research Center, which is used for the production or storage of chemical weapons. Two American officials quoted by AP said that Israel targeted a convoy of trucks, presumably containing SA-17 anti-aircraft, that was headed to reach Hezbollah in Lebanon. Syrian state TV and official news agency SANA carried a statement of the Syrian military command, claiming that Israel attacked the site and destroyed the building, killing two workers and injuring five others, but denied that the strike had targeted a convoy headed from Syria to Lebanon. Western diplomats quoted by Iraqi daily Azzaman claimed that the Israeli bombing of the Syrian military facility occurred two days before it was announced by Israeli leaks and that the announcement by international and US agencies about striking a convoy of weapons intended for smuggling near the Lebanese border may have been to camouflage the main objective of the operation, although some trucks were also destroyed in the attack. The Azzaman's sources said that the facility was heavily fortified with experts from Russia and at least 3,000 members of the Iranian Revolutionary Guards who had been guarding it for years, and that heavy casualties occurred in the ranks of the Iranian guards in particular. The Azzaman's sources also noted that the Israeli operation was linked to the previous Israeli strike on a Syrian nuclear site in Deir al-Zour a few years ago and that the Israelis may have obtained information on the transfer of materials related to nuclear enrichment of the Iranian nuclear reactor. Satellite images taken a few days after the attack showed a scorched and blackened parking lot at the center, where the arms convoy was apparently hit. A spokesman of the FSA stated that a Revolutionary Guards official, who had come to Syria to supervise the transfer of arms to Lebanon, was killed in that strike. IRGC's spokesman Ramezan Sherif issued a statement blaming Israel for killing him while he was en route from Damascus to Beirut, and identified him as a Revolutionary Guards commander who was also a head of the Iranian Committee for the Reconstruction of Lebanon. | (Ba'athist Syria) 2 civilians killed, 5 injured (Iran) 1 killed |
| 24 March 2013 | Golan Heights: Israeli troops near the border were shot twice in the span of 12 hours by Syrian fire. No Israeli soldiers were hurt in the shooting, though IDF vehicles were hit. (Ba'athist Syria) Quneitra Governorate: in retaliation, the IDF fired a Tamuz anti-tank guided missile against a Syrian machine gun nest, confirming a direct hit towards the source of the fire. | (Ba'athist Syria) 2 soldiers wounded |
| 2 April 2013 | Mount Peres, Golan Heights: a Syrian mortar landed near the area. There were no reports of injuries or damage. Tell Hazeka, Golan Heights: An IDF patrol on the border came under light fire from across the border. There were no reports of injuries or damage. (Ba'athist Syria) Quneitra Governorate: IDF's tanks hit a Syrian military outpost. The IDF confirmed a direct hit. | |
| 12 April 2013 | El Rom, Golan Heights: An IDF patrol in the Golan Heights came under artillery and small arms fire from Syrian Army forces. No injuries were reported, but damage was inflicted to an IDF vehicle. (Ba'athist Syria) Quneitra Governorate: The IDF returned fire using tanks and Tamuz anti-tank guided missile towards a Syrian army outpost, close to where the patrol came under fire. The IDF claimed a direct hit on the source of the fire. | |
| 27 April 2013 | (Ba'athist Syria) Jamraya, Rif Dimashq: The Syrian rebels' military headquarters issued a statement claiming that Israeli wareplanes attacked the military research facility of the Syrian Scientific Studies and Research Center. | |
| 3 May 2013 | (Ba'athist Syria) Damascus: Israeli wareplanes attacked the Damascus International Airport. An Israeli official confirmed to Reuters that Israel is behind the attack. A Western intelligence source quoted by Reuters said that Israel targeted stores of Fateh-110 missiles that were in transit from Iran to Hezbollah. (Ba'athist Syria) Al-Ma'atta, Damascus: according to a source in a Syria rebel unit in Damascus, Israel's F-16s attacked three times in Damascus. One of the attacks, he said, was carried out in the town of Al-Ma'atta, west of Damascus. | (Ba'athist Syria) 42 soldiers killed, 100 missing (SOHR claim) (Syria) 300 soldiers killed (opposition claim) |
| 5 May 2013 | Israeli warplanes attacked in and around Mount Qasioun, Al-Hamah, Qudsaya, Al-Sabboura, Jamraya, and al-Dimas, targeting a military facility and an arms depot of the 4th Armoured Division, warehouses of long-range missiles and bases belonging to the 104th and 105th Brigades of the Republican Guard, an ammunition warehouse belonging to the 14th Special Forces Division, a military research facility of the Syrian Scientific Studies and Research Center, al-Dimas Military Airport, and many others. | (Ba'athist Syria) 42 soldiers killed, 100 missing (SOHR claim) (Syria) 300 soldiers killed (opposition claim) |
| 15 May 2013 | Mount Hermon, Golan Heights: IDF positions were targeted by two mortar rounds that were fired by militants belonging to the "Abd al-Qadir al-Husayni Battalions" of the Free Palestine Movement. This was reportedly done in commemoration of Nakba Day. | |
| 21 May 2013 | Golan Heights: an Israeli vehicle was hit by Syrian fire. (Ba'athist Syria) Quneitra Governorate: Source of the attack was destroyed by Israeli fire. | |
| 5 June 2013 | Two mortar shells exploded in an open area near the Syrian border in the Golan Heights, south of Majdal-Shams. The IDF investigated whether they fell on the Israeli or Syrian side of the border. | |
| 16 June 2013 | (Ba'athist Syria) Mezzeh, Damascus: Huge explosion hit the Mezzeh Military Airport. State-run Syrian News Channel reported that the explosion resulted from an attempt to target the military airport. SOHR claimed that the blast resulted from a car bomb that was detonated at a checkpoint near the airport. The FSA's spokesman Louay Mikdad said that two bombs struck near the airtport, one near a checkpoint near the main door of the airport, and the second near an exterior wall of the airport. Israeli Yedioth Ahronoth, however, noted that Syrian media affiliated with the opposition estimated that the explosion was a result of an Israeli attack. One of the opposition members quoted in this context said: "I follow the airport and my house looks at it, and we usually see what is happening there with binoculars, and at some point yesterday armored vehicles entered it, presumably they had a portable radar system, and then was heard a sound of a missile that hit them inside the airport". Another quoted eyewitness said: "I saw the explosion and it was like a volcano, the flames were big and reached the sky, and three seconds later the sound of the explosion was heard, the same sound that was in Qasioun (which was targeted by an Israeli airstrike last May)". | (Ba'athist Syria) 10 soldiers killed, 10 wounded (SOHR claim) |
| 5 July 2013 | (Syria) Safira - Samiyah, Latakia: Explosions hit an arms depot at the Qassi Military Base, which is located near the port of Latakia. The FSA's Supreme Military Council spokesman, Qassim Saadeddine, said that a pre-dawn strike hit Syrian navy barracks of which the FSA's intelligence network had identified as a storage of newly supplied Yakhont anti-ship cruise missiles. Saadeddine added that it was not the FSA who targeted it, as it was beyond the firepower available to them, and suggested it was conducted either by air raid or long-range missiles fired from boats in the Mediterranean, pointing to an Israeli involvement. US officials confirmed to CNN that the strike was carried out by the Israeli Air Force, and that the target was Yakhont missiles. Citing Middle East intelligence sources, Sunday Times claimed that the explosions were the result of a cruise missile fired from the IDF's Dolphin-class submarine, targeting a consignment of 50 Yakhont P-800 missiles. | (Ba'athist Syria) 10–20 soldiers killed |
| 16 July 2013 | Golan Heights: Several mortar rounds were fired from Syria and hit across the border, leading to a fire that broke out and ignited in the area where Israeli tanks were reportedly stationed. | |
| 17 July 2013 | An Israeli army force on a routine patrol along the ceasefire line came under fire and shot back at a group of unidentified suspects on the frontier. There were no injuries among IDF soldiers. | |
| 27 July 2013 | The Revolutionary Council of the rebels in Quneitra claimed that Israeli warplanes bombed a convoy of missiles on its way from Syria to Lebanon. The Revolutionary Command Council has published on its Facebook page that Israeli Air Force planes bombed Syrian army positions. | |
| 17 August 2013 | Golan Heights: several Syrian mortar shells exploded in the Golan Heights. (Ba'athist Syria) Quneitra Governorate: a Syrian army position was fired by the IDF using a guided missile. | |
| 9 October 2013 | Golan Heights: two mortar shells fired from Syria hit the northern area, injuring 2 IDF soldiers. | (Israel) 2 soldiers injured |
| 21 October 2013 | al-Jarida reported that the Israeli Air Force struck a shipment of advanced missiles in the Syrian-Lebanese border, preventing it from reaching Hezbollah. | |
| 30 October 2013 | (Ba'athist Syria) Sanawbar - Jableh, Latakia: Huge explosions hit a missile military base near the agricultural institute. Quoted eyewitnesses said there were no casualties, but that the base was severely damaged. The site was reportedly attacked by Israeli vessels from the Mediterranean sea. International outlets reported that the target was to hit P-800 Oniks reservoirs - an advanced naval missile capable of hitting targets at close range, 300 km, while other sources claimed that the target was SA-125 surface-to-air anti-aircraft missiles. Al-Arabiya reported that Israel targeted SA-8 missiles. A US government official confirmed that Israel was behind the attack and that the targets were missiles and equipment that Israel feared Syria might transfer to Hezbollah. US officials quoted by AFP confirmed the Israeli airstrike, and claimed that the target was SA-125 missiles. (Ba'athist Syria) Damascus: Al-Arabiya reported that Israel attacked and destroyed SA-8 missiles, which were supposed to reach Hezbollah. (Ba'athist Syria) Ain Shikak: A Syrian opposition source quoted by Reuters said that Israel struck a strategic missile battery near a village called Ain Shikak where Assad's long-range Russian missiles were kept. | |
| 14 November 2013 | Sources of the FSA's intelligence reported that an Israeli drone bombarded a convoy of the Free Syrian Army which was on its way to the Qalamoun region. The convoy was reportedly loaded with ammunition which was looted from Mahin's warehouses. | |
| 6 December 2013 | Golan Heights: Israeli military vehicle had been damaged by a bomb set off by Syrians on the Syrian side of the frontier fence. | |
| 26 January 2014 | (Ba'athist Syria) Latakia: an explosion took place in the Sheikh Dahar neighborhood, near the port of Latakia, allegedly by Israeli warplanes targeting S-300 missile launchers. | |
| 24 February 2014 | Al-Nabi Shayth, Beqaa Valley: The official Lebanese news agency reported that Israeli warplanes carried out two attacks near the Syrian-Lebanese border in the Nabi Sheet area. The Voice of Lebanon radio reported that the target of the attack was Hezbollah convoys, which transferred very advanced rocket weapons from Syria to the organization's bunker in the northern Lebanon Valley. Al-Arabiya reported that the target of the attack was Hezbollah facilities inside Lebanon, near the border and that several Hezbollah members were killed in the attack. | 4 killed |
| 25 February 2014 | Israeli warplanes targeted Hezbollah positions in Yabroud, Zabadani, and Qalamoun. Five Hezbollah members were killed, including commander Abu Jamil Youne. | 5 killed |
| 1 March 2014 | Mount Hermon, Golan Heights: Two rockets were fired at an Israeli position, in what is reportedly a retaliation for an Israeli airstrike on a Hezbollah target near the Lebanese-Syrian border. | |
| 5 March 2014 | The Israeli army shot 3 Hezbollah fighters who tried to plant a bomb on the fence between the Israeli-controlled Golan Heights and Syrian-held territory. | |
| 14 March 2014 | After a detonation of an explosive device in the area of Mt. Dov that wounded three soldiers, the Israeli army fired a number of shells at the village of Kafr Kila in southern Lebanon. In retaliation for the detonation of the explosive device, an Israeli armored force attacked a Hezbollah position in the city of Halata near the Shebaa Farms. A few hours after the incident, the Islamic State of Iraq and al-Sham (ISIS) announced that it was taking responsibility for the attack on the Lebanese border. | (Israel) 3 soldiers wounded |
| 18 March 2014 | Golan Heights: An explosive device was detonated close to an Israeli jeep near the Syrian border. One soldier was seriously wounded. Another three soldiers sustained light-to-moderate injuries. This occurred a few days after a similar incident on the Israeli-Lebanese border when another explosive device targeted an Israeli jeep and Israel responded with artillery and tank fire towards Lebanon. Israel blamed Hezbollah for both incidents. (Ba'athist Syria) An IDF 155mm artillery battery returned fire, firing several shells at a Syrian outpost. Israel further responded by carrying out multiple airstrikes against Syrian targets, including a military headquarters, artillery batteries and a Syrian army training base. The Syrian army reported that the Israeli airstrikes killed one Syrian soldier and wounded seven. | (Israel) 4 soldiers wounded (Ba'athist Syria) 1 soldier killed, 7 wounded |
| 28 March 2014 | Israeli soldiers opened fire on two gunmen attempting to sabotage the border fence with Syria on the Golan Heights. The IDF said both armed suspects were struck by gunfire. | 2 unidentified militants killed |
| 2 June 2014 | Mount Hermon, Golan Heights: Syrian shells flew in the direction of Israeli military positions. No injuries or damage have been occurred. (Ba'athist Syria) Quneitra Governorate: the IDF responded with artillery salvos toward the sources of fire. | |
| 4 June 2014 | Golan Heights: two mortar shells were fired from Syria into Israeli-occupied territory. The Iron Dome missile defense system was activated for the first time in northern Israel and the Golan Heights to intercept the two shells. At least two intercepting missiles were fired towards the Syrian ceasefire line, but were "called off" in-flight by the Iron Dome's operators when it became clear the shells were going to fall in open fields. The falling shells caused fires in several spots in the area, but firefighters called to the scene and put out the fires. | |
| 22 June 2014 | Golan Heights: an anti-tank missile was fired across the border from Syria at a water truck moving along the border fence. A 14-year-old boy, the son of the contractor driving the truck, was killed and 3 other Israeli civilians were injured from the blast. (Ba'athist Syria) Quneitra Governorate: the Israeli military launched several airstrikes targeting Syrian troops in retaliation for the attack. At least ten Syrian soldiers were killed during the strikes. | (Israel) 1 civilian killed and 3 wounded (Ba'athist Syria) 10 soldiers killed |
| 7 July 2014 | Golan Heights: a mortar shell launched from Syria hit the Golan Heights, causing no injuries or damage. (Ba'athist Syria) Quneitra Governorate: the IDF responded by firing at suspicious positions on the Syrian side of the border. | |
| 13 July 2014 | Golan Heights: a rocket landed in an open area. No injuries or damage were reported. The IDF reported that the rocket was deliberately fired from Syria at Israel. | |
| 15 July 2014 | Golan Heights: a rocket hit the area. (Ba'athist Syria) Baath City / al-Kawm, Quneitra: in retaliation, Israeli warplanes struck three targets in Quneitra area. UK-based SOHR reported that Israeli warplanes struck the headquarters of the 90th Brigade and the Baath City, where the Syrian government's headquarters and administrative centers are located. SOHR reported that the Israeli attack killed 4, two guards and two women, and injured 10 others. Turkish-based Daily Sabah, quoted a Syrian opposition claiming the killing of 18 Syrian, including eight civilians and ten soldiers. | (Ba'athist Syria) 2–10 soldiers and 2–8 civilians killed (SOHR and opposition claims) |
| 24 August 2014 | Golan Heights: Five rockets from Syria landed across the border in open areas and no injuries were reported. | |
| 27 August 2014 | Golan Heights: Three errant mortar shells fired from Syria hit the Golan Heights, wounding an Israeli officer and causing damage to a pair of vehicles. An Israeli civilian was lightly injured. (Ba'athist Syria) Quneitra Governorate: The IDF responded with artillery fire against a Syrian army position. | (Israel) 1 soldier and 1 civilian injured |
| 31 August 2014 | Golan Heights: The IDF shot down a drone that entered Israeli air space from the Quneitra region in Syria. Army sources said the drone likely belonged to the military of the Syrian government, and strayed into Israeli airspace by accident. After the remains of the drone were recovered by Israeli security forces, Israeli officials said that the drone was an Iranian-made Yasir model. | |
| 2 September 2014 | Golan Heights: There were a number of small-scale shooting on journalists who came to cover the Syrian side of the border in the Quneitra area. There were no casualties and no damage was done. An Israeli military source estimated that this was not deliberate fire but rather machine-gun fire by the Syrian army against the rebel forces, which leapt into Israeli-occupied territory near Quneitra. | |
| 4 September 2014 | Golan Heights: a rocket hit the Golan Heights. (Ba'athist Syria) Quneitra Governorate: in retaliation, the IDF fired a missile at a Syrian army position. | |
| 8 September 2014 | Golan Heights: An IDF soldier was lightly injured by a stray bullet. | (Israel) 1 soldier wounded |
| 23 September 2014 | Golan Heights: Israel shot down an errant Syrian jet fighter that had strayed over the Golan Heights. | |
| 7 December 2014 | (Ba'athist Syria) Al-Dimas, Rif Dimashq: Arab media reported that Israeli jets attacked three targets at or near al-Dimas military airbase and Damascus International Airport. Some reports stated that the Syrian troops fired back a surface-to-air-missile at an IAF aircraft following the raid. Syrian military sources claimed that their air defense units had been able to down an Israel drone that had taken part in the raid. Lebanese Al-Mayadeen reported that the planes launched 10 bombs. (Ba'athist Syria) al-Kawm, Quneitra: Israeli jets struck the 90th Brigade. | 3 killed |
| 18 January 2015 | (Ba'athist Syria) Mazraat Amal, Quneitra: a cell of the Hezbollah's fighters was attacked by Israel. Hezbollah's Al-Manar TV channel confirmed that several of its fighters had been killed in the air force attack, including Jihad Mughniyah. | 6 killed (Iran) 6 killed |
| 27 January 2015 | Golan Heights: two projectiles fired from Syria landed in the Golan Heights without causing injuries or damage. (Ba'athist Syria) Quneitra Governorate: the IDF returned artillery fire toward the source of the projectiles, claiming direct hits. | |
| 31 February 2015 | (Ba'athist Syria) Homs Governorate: A security source of the Syrian government quoted by Arabi21 said that Israel struck warehouses of the 18th Armoured Division, resulting in the complete vanishment of the warehouses and the soldiers who inhabited them. | |
| 10 March 2015 | Golan Heights: An IDF officer was slightly injured near the Syrian border by small arms fire from Syria. The officer did not need medical treatment. (Ba'athist Syria) Quneitra Governorate: IDF returned fire at the source of the shooting. | |
| 15 April 2015 | Alonei Habashan, Golan Heights: An apparent stray mortar shell landed in an open area and there were no casualties. | |
| 22 April 2015 | (Ba'athist Syria) Qalamoun Mountains: Al Arabiya reported that Israel struck a Hezbollah convoy carrying weapons near the Lebanese-Syrian border. Al Arabiya reported that at least one person was killed in that attack. | (Ba'athist Syria) 1 killed |
| 25 April 2015 | (Ba'athist Syria) Qalamoun Mountains: Al-Jazeera network reported that Israeli planes had bombed Syrian and Hezbollah targets near the Syrian-Lebanese border. Al-Jazeera reported that the attack was intended to target the bases of the 155th and 65 brigades that specialize in strategic weapons and long-range missiles. Al-Arabiya network claimed that the target was Syrian Scud missile stockpiles. | 6 killed |
| 26 April 2015 | According to Israeli military, an Israeli air strike killed four militants armed with a bomb along the Israeli-Syrian frontier in the Golan Heights. Israeli military sources said the militants were spotted placing explosives on a fence near Majdal Shams. | 4 unknown militants killed |
| 27 April 2015 | (Ba'athist Syria) Qalamoun Mountains: Arab news networks al-Jazeera and al-Arabiya reported that Israel targeted missile launchers held by Hezbollah and forces loyal to Syrian President Bashar Assad. Citing reliable sources, Israeli Ynet reported that the explosions were the work of the Al-Nusra Front militant group fighting the Assad regime, and not Israel, adding that the group "is apparently trying to make psychological gains that would lead to the departure of the Syrian army and Hezbollah from the region, making them believe that Israel is launching strikes there, and taking advantage of the alleged previous Israeli assault." On the other hand, Syrian opposition factions announced on social media that they were responsible for the attack on the Syrian missile base, claiming that they have four units stationed in the Qalamoun region who fired some 30 Grad rockets at the base. | |
| 28 April 2015 | Ein Zivan, Golan Heights: An alarm sounded at 12:00 in the Golan Heights. Civilians in the Golan reported hearing explosions, apparently two hits in the orchards of Kibbutz Ein Zivan. Troops scanned the area. | |
| 17 June 2015 | Golan Heights: At 11:46, an alarm sounded in northern Golan Heights: Ortal, Aloni Habashan, Merom Golan, Ein Zivan and Keshet. The IDF spokesman reported that security forces had scanned the area, but that no hits had been identified at this stage. Apparently, mortar shells exploded on the Syrian side of the border, a few meters from the perimeter fence. | |
| 18 June 2015 | (Ba'athist Syria) } Syrian media reported that Israeli missiles hit the following targets: (Ba'athist Syria) Al-Sanamayn, Daraa: The Syrian Army's 150th regiment, destroying its missile bases and air defense vehicles. Syrian opposition elements accused Israel that it tried to prevent the rebels from seizing control of the advanced weapons and equipments.; (Ba'athist Syria) Khalkhalah, As-Suwayda: Khalkhalah Military Airport. | |
| 21 June 2015 | (Lebanon) Saghbine, Beqaa Valley: Al Jazeera reported that Israeli jets attacked targets in the mountainous areas. However, Hezbollah-affiliated Al-Manar reported that an Israeli drone crashed in the area, and that later an Israeli aircraft fired on it and destroyed the downed drone. | |
| 23 June 2015 | Majdal Shams, Golan Heights: several dozen Druze from the village attacked an Israeli military ambulance evacuating two wounded Syrians from the neutral zone. The attack was reportedly motivated by a rumor that the ambulance evacuated jihadist fighters from Syria. The attack on the ambulance resulted in the beating to death of one of the wounded Syrians, and the other's deterioration into a critical condition; an Israeli officer and a soldier were also wounded in the incident. The attack was reported by the media as a "lynch" by Druze mob, but drew a praise from the Syrian state media, who defined the act as "heroic". The Prime Minister of Israel consequently pledged to track down those responsible for the act and bring them to justice. The attack was also condemned by the Israeli Druze leader, Sheikh Muafak Tarif, who said that an emergency meeting of religious and secular Druze leaders "strongly condemned" the ambulance attack, calling it "a deplorable act committed by outlaws". | 1 killed, 1 wounded (Israel) 2 soldiers wounded |
| 28 June 2015 | Golan Heights: Rocket alert sirens sounded twice in 30 minutes. The IDF said the sirens were triggered by internal Syrian battles between rebel groups and Assad forces. | |
| 8 July 2015 | (Ba'athist Syria) Jubata al-Khashab, Quneitra: Syrian activists reported that elements of the Israeli army entered with several armored vehicles into the al-Shahaar refugee camp near the border strip between Quneitra region and the Israeli-controlled Golan Heights. Quoted eyewitnesses said that the Israeli army instructioned the displaced people to evacuate, and destroyed the tents of the residents, and that afterwards the Israeli army returned with their vehicles beyond the border. | |
| 29 July 2015 | (Ba'athist Syria) Hader, Quneitra: The Lebanese Al Mayadeen network, which is affiliated with Hezbollah, reported that Israel attacked a vehicle, killing three members of the popular committees, militias identified with Syrian President Bashar. The Al-Manar network, which belongs to Hezbollah, claimed that an Israeli drone carried out an attack and killed two people. Other reports claimed that five people were killed, including members of Hezbollah. | (Ba'athist Syria) 3 militiamen killed 2 killed |
| 3 August 2015 | Golan Heights: Two mortar shells exploded in an open area in the northern Golan Heights, and one woman was lightly injured. The mortar shells exploded in the orchards near the border, and are apparently a spillover of the Syrian Civil War. | 1 resident wounded |
| 20 August 2015 | Four rockets struck the Israeli-controlled Golan Heights and Upper Galilee. Security sources said the Islamic Jihad organization was responsible for the rocket fire, with the financial backing and the direction of Iran. Furthermore, Israel said that Syria was also responsible and "will suffer the consequences". The IDF retaliated with air strikes on Syrian Army warehouses and infrastructure in the Quneitra and Rif Dimashq region of Syria later that day and artillery fire at 14 targets in Syria including: (Ba'athist Syria) al-Kawm, Quneitra: The 90th Brigade's base.; (Ba'athist Syria) Tal al-Sha'ar, Quneitra: Syrian army's reconnaissance forces stationed in the area.; (Ba'athist Syria) Tal al-Shamm, Quneitra; (Ba'athist Syria) Jaba, Quneitra; (Ba'athist Syria) Al-Hamidiyah, Quneitra; (Ba'athist Syria) Tal Bazak (Muhaysir), Quneitra: A guns depot; (Ba'athist Syria) Baath City, Quneitra: Syrian army's artillery battalion, and the fire station.; (Ba'athist Syria) The 137th Brigade in the western suburbs of Damascus.; (Ba'athist Syria) The 220th Brigade.; After six hours, the IDF resumed its attacks on Ba'athist Syrian forces, targeting: (Ba'athist Syria) Khan al-Shih, Rif Dimashq: The 68th Brigade's base.; (Ba'athist Syria) al-Kawm, Quneitra: The 90th Brigade's base.; Fars News Agency reported that the Syrian air defense system shot down an Israeli warplane violating Syiran airspace. | (Ba'athist Syria) 2–3 soldiers killed, 8 wounded (SOHR and local activist claims) |
| 21 August 2015 | A day after four rocket struck the Golan Heights, the IDF launched an additional airstrike on a vehicle, killing 4-5 allegedly Iran-backed Islamic Jihad militants who were believed to be the perpetrators of the initial attack on Israel. The Syrian government refuted this report, claiming that the attack killed five civilians. | (Ba'athist Syria); PIJ; 5 militants killed (SOHR and Israel claim) (Ba'athist Syria) 5 civilians killed (Syria claim) |
| 26 September 2015 | Golan Heights: a rocket hit the Israeli-controlled Golan Heights without causing any injury or damage. The Israeli military did not retaliate. | |
| 27 September 2015 | Golan Heights: a rockets hit the Israeli-controlled Golan Heights without causing any injury or damage. (Ba'athist Syria) Quneitra Governorate: The Israeli military said that they hit two Syrian military installations in response to errant mortar fire launched from Syria that has landed in Israel in the past two days. RCC spokesman Abu Ali al-Jawlani confirmed that Israel targeted at least three government-held military with three missiles. UK-based SOHR reported that Israel fired at least 3 rockets against the a military company which belongs to the 90th Brigade of the Syrian Army. | (Ba'athist Syria) 2 soldiers killed |
| 30 October 2015 | The Lebanese and Syrian media reported that Israel Air Force warplanes have attacked targets in Syria linked to Hezbollah, in the Qalamoun Mountains region of western Syria, in the Damascus area, and in southern Syria. (Ba'athist Syria) Ras al-Ayn, Rif Dimashq: Syria Mubasher, an opposition-affiliated news site, reported that Israeli warplanes struck a military facility. Israel reportedly targeted two Hezbollah positions between Ras al-Maara and Ras al-Ayn, one of which was a weapons shipment headed to reach Hezbollah. (Ba'athist Syria) Al-Qutayfah, Rif Dimashq: Israeli wareplanes launched sixteen rockets against three warehouses containing Scud missiles at the 155th Brigade base. | |
| 1 November 2015 | (Ba'athist Syria) Al-Qutayfah, Rif Dimashq: Media outlets affiliated with the Syrian rebel groups reported that the Israeli Air Force attacked the 155th Brigade's three Scud missile stores at the border area, between Syria and Lebanon, which is used for weapons smuggling by Hezbollah. | |
| 11 November 2015 | (Ba'athist Syria) Damascus: Syrian opposition groups reported that weapons shipment intended for Hezbollah near Damascus International Airport were targeted by Israeli jets. | |
| 23 November 2015 | (Ba'athist Syria) Qalamoun Mountains: The Syrian opposition reported an Israeli airstrike in the Qualamoun area of the Syria–Lebanon border. According to these sources, the strike killed 13 Syrian troops and Hezbollah fighters, and left dozens wounded, including four seriously. | (Syria) 5 soldiers killed 8 killed |
| 26 November 2015 | (Ba'athist Syria) Flitah, Rif Dimashq: Israel fired three strikes on Hezbollah positions on the hillside of Flitah, forcing them to withdraw to town of Flitah. | |
| 28 November 2015 | (Ba'athist Syria) Qalamoun Mountains: Syrian sources reported that Israeli aircraft attacked Syrian army and Hezbollah targets, causing dead and wounded among Hezbollah fighters. | (Ba'athist Syria) several killed and wounded |
| 4 December 2015 | Syrian media reported that Israel attacked in the Qalamoun Mountains near the Syrian-Lebanese border, and shortly afterwards bombed the 155th Brigade in the Al-Qutayfah area. According to other reports, the Israeli Air Force struck northeast of Damascus and destroyed trucks carrying ballistic missiles at the 155th base and on the road leading to Beirut from Syria. | |
| 19 December 2015 | (Ba'athist Syria) Jaramana, Rif Dimashq: Israel struck an apartment building, killing Samir Quntar, a Hezbollah member, and nine others. | 10 killed |
| 26 December 2015 | (Ba'athist Syria) Qalamoun Mountains: Syrian sources reported that Israel attacked at least 7 Hezbollah targets. Hezbollah denied any explosions at its bases. | |
| 11 January 2016 | (Ba'athist Syria) Flitah, Rif Dimashq: Syrian opposition sources reported that Israeli aircraft conducted as much as five strikes against Hezbollah targets. A subsequent report added that ambulance sirens were heard in nearby town Yabroud after the alleged strikes. | |
| 9 February 2016 | (Ba'athist Syria) Al-Qutayfah, Rif Dimashq: Syrian sources reported that Israel attacked the 155th Brigade's Scud missile base and a Hezbollah military base on the Syrian-Lebanese border. Hezbollah-affiliated Al-Manar denied the reports. (Ba'athist Syria) Al-Ruhaybah, Rif Dimashq: Reports claimed that Israel attacked Syrian army warehouses. | |
| 17 February 2016 | The UK-based Syrian Observatory for Human Rights reported that three Israeli rockets had hit Syrian army outposts south of Damascus. | |
| 10 May 2016 | Anjar, Beqaa Valley: Israeli Air Force attacked a Hezbollah convoy which included six vehicles near the village as it made its way from Syria to Lebanon in the Qalamoun Mountains on the border with Syria. | |
| 12 May 2016 | (Ba'athist Syria) Damascus: According to Lebanese TV station al-Mayadeen, the top commander of Hezbollah, Mustafa Badreddine, was killed in an IDF military operation near the Damascus International Airport in Syria | 1 killed, several wounded (Iran) 2 killed, several wounded |
| 6 June 2016 | (Ba'athist Syria) Shinshar, Homs: Zaman al-Wasl reported that the Israeli Air Force conducted raids against fortifications related to the fourth mechanical battalion of the Syrian army. | |
| 7 June 2016 | (Ba'athist Syria) Al-Qutayfah, Rif Dimashq: Arab sources reported that Israeli Air Force bombed an ammunition warehouse inside a 19th Brigade's military base, destroying an ammunition intended for Hizbollah. | |
| 4 July 2016 | Golan Heights: Errant fire from fighting in Syria's civil war struck the Israeli-controlled Golan Heights. (Ba'athist Syria) Tal al-Sha'ar, Quneitra: In response, the Israeli Army struck two targets belonging to the Syrian military in Quneitra. | |
| 5 July 2016 | (Ba'athist Syria) Baath City, Quneitra: Israel struck a perceived weapons warehouse which local sources reported was an empty workers housing facility that had no Syrian military presence. | (Ba'athist Syria) 1 wounded child |
| 17 July 2016 | Ayelet HaShahar, Golan Heights: An unmanned aircraft penetrated the Golan Heights. The IDF fired two Patriot missiles that failed to intercept it. The fragments of the fallen missiles caused a fire on Kibbutz Ayelet Hashahar. It is not clear whether this was a UAV of the Assad, Russian or Hizbollah forces | (Israel) 1 civilian wounded |
| 20 July 2016 | Golan Heights: Syrian eyewitnesses qutoted by Al Khaleej Online said that Syrian mortar shells fell in the Israeli-controlled Golan. (Ba'athist Syria) Baath City, Quneitra: Local sources claimed that Israel conducted three airstrikes against a building belonging to the Syrian government forces and the Iranian-support groups. Al Khaleej Online, citing private sources, reported that Israel targeted a military security center of the Syrian government, and that the bombing resulted in many deaths and injuries in the center. Al Khaleej Online reported that according to preliminary information, the targeted center includes a headquarters for joint operations between the forces of the Syrian government and the Lebanese Hezbollah leadership in the region. A senior Syrian official quoted by a German news agency said that an Israeli aircraft had fired a missile at a Syrian position, killing a civilian and wounding three soldiers. The Lebanese Al-Mayadeen news agency, however, denied the accuracy of reports attributing the bombing to Israeli airstrikes in Syria, quoting Hezbollah saying the al-Qaeda affiliated Nusra Front launched rockets at Quneitra, inflicting casualties. | (Ba'athist Syria) 1 civilian killed, 3 soldiers wounded |
| 25 July 2016 | Golan Heights: Mortars exploded on the Israeli-held territory. (Ba'athist Syria) Baath City, Quneitra: Two military outposts belonging to the Syrian army were targeted by the Israeli Army. | |
| 27 July 2016 | (Ba'athist Syria) Hader, Quneitra: A National Defense Forces convoy near the predominately Druze town in the Golan Heights, was struck by an Israeli drone, killing three members of the National Defense Forces and wounding another half dozen men. It was described as an “attack on Hezbollah military installations”. | (Ba'athist Syria) 3 killed, half dozen wounded |
| 22 August 2016 | Golan Heights: A Syrian mortar shell landed in an open area near the security fence and an outpost on the Israeli-controlled Golan Heights. (Ba'athist Syria) Quneitra Governorate: The Syrian mortar launchers were attacked in response by the IDF. | |
| 4 September 2016 | Golan Heights: A Syrian mortar shell fired from Syria landed on a road. (Ba'athist Syria) Mashati, Quneitra: Syrian artillery launchers were attacked in response by the IDF. | |
| 7 September 2016 | Golan Heights: Syria mortars landed on the Israeli-controlled area. No damages or injuries were reported. | |
| 8 September 2016 | (Ba'athist Syria) Golan Heights, Quneitra: Mortars in the Syrian-controlled northern Golan Heights were attacked in retaliation of the Syrian mortars landing on Israeli-controlled area in the day. | |
| 10 September 2016 | Golan Heights: A mortar shell landed in the northern area. (Ba'athist Syria) Quneitra Governorate: Syrian army mortar launchers were attacked by the Israeli Air Force. | |
| 12 September 2016 | Golan Heights: in an apparent case of spillover fighting of the Syrian civil war, a mortar shell was identified in the northern area. No casualties or damage was reported. | |
| 13 September 2016 | Overnight the Israel warplanes struck Syrian artillery positions on the Syrian controlled Golan Heights, in retaliation for the previous night's mortal shell that fell in the Israeli-controlled Golan Heights. In response to the IDF attack, two surface-to-air missiles were launched from Syria. On the morning, the Syrian military claimed to have intercepted an Israeli jet near Quneitra and a military drone in the vicinity of Sa'sa' in southern Syria. The online news outlet Al-Masdar Al-'Arabi published a video on the same day, purporting to show an Israeli plane downed by a Syrian rocket, although it is not a clear footage. Israeli Army spokesman denied the report, branding it "total lies". | (Ba'athist Syria) 2 soldiers killed |
| 17 September 2016 | Golan Heights: The Iron Dome system recorded a first interception in the Golan Heights sector when it intercepted a high-trajectory fire from Syria. It is unclear whether the threat that was intercepted was a mortar shell or an artillery rocket. About two hours after the interception, another interception took place. (Ba'athist Syria) Khan Arnabah, Quneitra: An Israeli drone attacked artillery positions manned by Syrian Army. At least one soldier was killed in the attack and several others wounded. | (Ba'athist Syria) 1 soldier killed |
| 9 November 2016 | Golan Heights: A mortar shell fired from Syria landed in the Israeli-controlled area. (Ba'athist Syria) Quneitra Governorate: A Syrian artillery was attacked by the IDF in response.In response, the IDF attacked a Syrian artillery battery. | |
| 27 November 2016 | Golan Heights: Israeli forces were ambushed by ISIS-linked militants. In the ensuing firefight and Israeli airstrike, four terrorists were killed; there were no IDF casualties. | (Islamic State) 8 killed |
| 28 November 2016 | (Ba'athist Syria) Quneitra Governorate: Israel struck an abandoned United Nations building that was suspected of being used as a base by ISIS militants. The facility was controlled by the Khalid ibn al-Walid Army, which is part of ISIS. | |
| 8 February 2017 | Golan Heights: A mortar shell fired from a tank in Syria exploded in open territory. (Ba'athist Syria) Baath City, Quneitra: In retaliation, an Israeli helicopter attacked Syrian military structures. | |
| 17 March 2017 | Golan Heights: Israeli Defense Forces aircraft were reportedly targeted by several Syrian S-200 missiles above the Western Golan Heights, and one missile was shot down by an Arrow 2. Israel denied Syria's claim that one jet fighter was shot down and another damaged. | 1 killed |
| 19 March 2017 | (Ba'athist Syria) Khan Arnabah, Quneitra: An Israeli drone strike reportedly killed a member of a Syrian pro-government militia. | (Ba'athist Syria) 1 militiaman killed |
| 20 March 2017 | Syria media reported that Israeli jets took out a number of targets near the Lebanon-Syria border including a Hezbollah weapons convoy and Syrian military sites. | |
| 21 March 2017 | (Ba'athist Syria) Hader, Quneitra: An IDF's Skylark I drone ("Sky Rider" in Hebrew) fell while it was on a mission. Hezbollah claimed to have shot down the drone, and later the Syrian Defense Ministry released a statement saying that its air defense unit had shot down the drone. The IDF's Spokesperson's Unit denied the reports that the drone had been shot down. | |
| 6 April 2017 | Alonei HaBashan, Golan Heights: A girl from the village of Haspin was lightly wounded during an excursion in Alonei HaBashan, and a preliminary examination suggested that it was caused by an explosion of a burner gas. After the preliminary examination of the girl at the hospital she was released to her home. As a result of the pain, she was evacuated again to the hospital, and then a bullet was found in her back. An additional investigation conducted indicated that the shooting was erroneous and unintended as a result of the internal fighting in Syria. | (Israel) 1 civilian wounded |
| 21 April 2017 | Golan Heights: Three mortar shells from Syria landed in the northern area. (Ba'athist Syria) Quneitra Governorate: In retaliation, the Israeli army attacked positions affiliated with the Syrian government. | |
| 22 April 2017 | Golan Heights: Three mortar shells landed in the Israeli-controlled Golan Heights. and the IDF responded by firing at Syrian positions. (Ba'athist Syria) Quneitra Governorate: Syrian positions were fired in retaliation by the IDF. | |
| 23 April 2017 | (Ba'athist Syria) Naba al-Fawwar, Quneitra: Israeli forces attacked a camp of the pro-Syrian government group National Defence Forces, resulting in the destruction of a weapons depot. | (Ba'athist Syria) 3 soldiers killed, 2 wounded |
| 27 April 2017 | (Ba'athist Syria) Damascus: Israel warplanes targeted a weapons hub, containing arms sent from Iran to Hezbollah, located near the Damascus International Airport. Golan Heights: The IDF fired a Patriot missile towards a drone that penetrated into Israeli airspace, and successfully downed it. Initially it was not clear if the aircraft was Russian or Syrian, but the Israeli army later confirmed that it was Syrian. | |
| 29 April 2017 | (Ba'athist Syria) Damascus: Arab media and Syrian opposition forces reported that the Israeli Air Force struck Syrian Army forces. Al Mayadeen network quoted Syrian army officials who denied an attack had taken place. | |
| 26 May 2017 | (Ba'athist Syria) Al-Hamdiyah - Abu Shabta, Quneitra: An Israeli drone reportedly conducted numerous strikes in the province, leading to the death of three SAA soldiers. The Syrian Air Defense Force promptly opened fire and downed the drone over rebel-held territory. Hezbollah-affiliated Al Mayadeen denied the reports of an Israeli attack and claimed that the Syrian soldiers were killed in battles with rebels near the town of Al-Hamidiya. | (Ba'athist Syria) 3 soldiers killed |
| 24 June 2017 | (Ba'athist Syria) IAF aircraft destroyed two Syrian army tanks and a machine gun position in response to ten shells fired by Syrian artillery pieces hitting the Israeli side of the ceasefire line the previous day. Syrian state news agencies stated that several Syrian soldiers and civilians were killed. | (Ba'athist Syria) 13 soldiers killed |
| 25 June 2017 | Golan Heights: Syrian projectiles hit the Israeli-controlled Golan Heights. (Ba'athist Syria) Quneitra Governorate: Israeli military targeted two artillery positions and an ammunitions truck belonging to the Syrian government, in response to the projectiles. | (Ba'athist Syria) 13 soldiers killed |
| 26 June 2017 | Golan Heights: Israeli media reported there had been a leakage of mortar shells from Syria towards the northern Golan Heights. However, The IDF Spokesperson's Office clarified that there had not been a leakage of mortar shells, and that surveys in the fields indicate that individual machine gun bullets hit the UNDOF camp in Ein Zivan, near the fence in the northern Golan Heights. As a result of the bullets, a fire broke out in a nearby minefield. (Ba'athist Syria) Quneitra Governorate: The Israeli Air Force struck Syrian army positions at the Mafrazeh Al-Jisr Checkpoint in the Golan Heights, killing 2 soldiers and wounding three others. Another Israeli airstrike was reported at the village of Ayn-Aysha. | (Ba'athist Syria) 13 soldiers killed |
| 27 June 2017 | (Ba'athist Syria) Damascus: The Syrian state media reported that the Israeli jets targeted Syrian military position southwest of Damascus International Airport. | |
| 28 June 2017 | Golan Heights: A a stray mortar shell hit an open area in the Israeli-controlled northern Golan Heights, causing no injuries. (Ba'athist Syria) Samadanieh al-Sharqiyeh, Quneitra: The Israeli army attacked a Syrian military position, in retaliation for the stray mortar. | |
| 30 June 2017 | Golan Heights: Two Syrian hits were identified in the northern Golan Heights, near the border fence. (Ba'athist Syria) Quneitra Governorate: A Syrian-made cannon belonging to the Syrian government was attacked in retaliation by the Israeli army. | |
| 4 July 2017 | Israeli jet, believed to be a drone, fired a missiles on a position of Syrian government forces and their allied militiamen in the northern sector of Al-Quneitra countryside. | |
| 19 September 2017 | An Iranian unmanned aircraft from Hezbollah entered the demilitarized zone near the Golan Heights and was shot down by the air defense system using a MIM-104D Patriot air-to-air missile. | |
| 22 September 2017 | (Ba'athist Syria) Damascus: Reports claimed that Israel Air Force struck Hezbollah weapons depot near the Damascus International Airport. | |
| 26 September 2017 | (Ba'athist Syria) al-Kawm, Quneitra: Syrian sources reported that an Israeli aircraft launched raids on the 90th Brigade's base. | |
| 10 October 2017 | Golan Heights: Small arms hit near a field clinic which operates in the framework of the "Operation Good Neighbor", and close to the border (in an enclave) in the southern Golan Heights. As a result of the stray shooting, A foreign national doctor, who works in the clinic as a medical staff member, was lightly wounded and was treated at the site. | |
| 16 October 2017 | Israeli forces attacked an anti-aircraft battery in Syria. | |
| 19 October 2017 | A rocket from Syria landed in the Golan Heights. The IDF responded by attacking the a Syrian army position. | |
| 21 October 2017 | Israeli forces struck three Syrian artillery positions after five projectiles were launched towards Israel. Three of the five projectiles landed in open territory in northern Golan Heights, causing no damage or injuries. According to Syrian Government sources, the attack from Syria came "after terrorists linked to Israel had launched mortar shells, upon the instructions of the Israeli occupation, on an area of empty land inside the occupied territories to give the Israeli enemy a pretext to carry out its aggression." | |
| 23 October 2017 | (Ba'athist Syria) Yarmouk Basin, Daraa: Israeli strikes targeted Jaysh Khalid Ibn Al-Walid's headquarters, killing at least 10 members and leaders of Jaysh Khalid Ibn Al-Walid. | (Islamic State) 10 killed |
| 1 November 2017 | (Ba'athist Syria) Hisyah, Homs: Israeli warplanes targeted a Syrian military or Hezbollah installation that was believed to manufacture rockets. Pro-government sources claimed that the target was a storage warehouse in an industrial complex or a copper factory. | |
| 3 November 2017 | (Ba'athist Syria) Hader, Quneitra: On the morning, Tahrir al-Sham and allied Free Syrian Army launched a large scale offensive against the government forces in Hader, in order to break the siege of the nearby Beit Jinn opposition pocket. Al-Masdar News, which backs the Syrian government, reported that this was done with direct artillery support from the Israeli Defense Forces (IDF). Majdal Shams, Golan Heights: A Druze resident was slightly injured by small arms fire from Syrian territory. Subsequently, a large number of Druze residents of the Golan began to protest against the rebel's offensive on the predominantly Druze village, Hader. In response, the IDF spokesman said: "In the light of the escalation of fighting in Hadar, Israel has not helped and will not support any terrorist organization to touch the inhabitants of the village. On the contrary, we will continue to stand by the Druze in the Golan Heights". (Ba'athist Syria) Trinjeh, Quneitra: Syrian sources reported that Israel began shelling rebel positions after the rebel's assault reached towards the Druze village of Hader. The FSA groups announced that they were forced to retreat after Israeli forces intervened on the side of pro-Assad militias by targeting the reinforcements the FSA groups sent to the border strip of land in southwestern Syria. On the other hand, Israeli researcher Elizabeth Tsurkov claimed that the reports of Israeli shelling on the rebels were nothing more than false rumors. | 1 resident wounded |
| 11 November 2017 | The IDF's air defense system dropped an unmanned aerial vehicle in the northern Golan Heights before it was able to cross the border into Israel. The aircraft was shot down by a MIM-104D air-to-air missile Patriot. | |
| 13 November 2017 | (Ba'athist Syria) Al-Mula'il - Al-Rafid, Quneitra: Fighters from the Free Syrian Army factions and a group of youths ambushed three armored Israeli vehicles, trying to rob a humanitarian aid shipment. The Israeli army promptly struck the group with anti-personnel missiles. No injuries were recorded. | |
| 18 November 2017 | (Ba'athist Syria) Ayn al-Tineh, Quneitra: The Israeli army fired a warning shot towards the area by a tank. The Israeli army issued a statement, claiming that the forces of the Syrian regime ""violated the cease-fire signed in 1974, through the construction work aimed at strengthening a military center in the northern part of the demilitarized zone". | |
| 19 November 2017 | (Ba'athist Syria) Qers al-Nafl, Quneitra: A day after the IDF fired a warning shot due to Syrian regime's violation of the cease-fire agreement, the IDF's artillery fired "warning shots" and the army issued a similar statement. However, the Israeli statement this time indicated that it had filed a complaint with the United Nations Disengagement Observer Force (UNDOF), which monitors the cease-fire line. | |
| 28 November 2017 | (Ba'athist Syria) Daraa Governorate: Opposition groups, aided by limited Israeli air support, had launched a major offensive codenamed “The People of the Land” against the Islamic State-affiliated Jaish Khalid Ibn al-Walid. The rebels made minor advances on the Tasil front, but later the Islamic state quickly reversed all the rebels' gains in a counterattack. | |
| 1 December 2017 | (Ba'athist Syria) Al-Kiswah, Rif Dimashq: Iranian military base or ammunition warehouse was targeted by the IDF using both surface-to-surface missiles and warplanes. | (Iran) 12 killed |
| 4 December 2017 | (Ba'athist Syria) Jamraya, Rif Dimashq: Reports claimed that Israel targeted the military research facility of the Syrian Scientific Studies and Research Center. Syria's state news agency reported that Syrian air defense has shot down three Israeli missiles which targeted the site. | |
| 5 December 2017 | (Ba'athist Syria) Jabal Azzan, Aleppo: Syrian sources reported that an Iranian base was subjected to air strikes, causing huge explosions inside it. The sources said that they believe that the air strikes were conducted by the Israeli Air Force because of the absence of any flight by Russian or other aircraft at the time in the northern region. This was confirmed by the generalizations of the local observatories which monitor the movement of the air traffic in the north. | |
| 22 December 2017 | (Ba'athist Syria) Al-Qutayfah, Rif Dimashq: Israeli Air Force targeted the 155th Brigade's Scud missile base. Pro-government media denied the reports. | |
| 9 January 2018 | (Ba'athist Syria) Al-Qutayfah, Rif Dimashq: Israel attacked the 155th Brigade's Scud missile base. | |
| 1 February 2018 | (Ba'athist Syria) Daraa: Syrian opposition media reported that during an offensive by rebel groups against the Islamic State, Israel launched four surface-to-surface missiles against Islamic State positions. | (Islamic State) 10 killed |
| 7 February 2018 | (Ba'athist Syria) Jamraya, Rif Dimashq: the Syrian army claimed that early in the morning the Israeli Air Force fired missiles from Lebanese territory towards the military research facility of the Syrian Scientific Studies and Research Center. | |
| 10 February 2018 | Beit Shean: An Israeli AH-64 Apache helicopter shot down an Iranian-produced copy of the RQ-170 drone (Saegheh) (Ba'athist Syria) Tiyas, Homs: In response to the sighting of the drone crossing the Israeli border, 8 F-16s of the Israeli Air Force (IAF) struck Tiyas Military Airbase from which the Israeli military said the drone had launched, very likely with standoff weapons. Harduf, Jezreel Valley: The Israeli attack prompted a response from Syrian Air Defense systems, which after firing on the Israeli jets, shot down an Israeli F-16I fighter jet over northern Israel. Two weeks later, Israeli Defence Forces (IDF) stated that the F-16I was hit by a S-200 surface-to-air missile (SAM) with the crew failing to take proper evasive actions. The same statement reported that 13 SAMs had been fired at the 8 F-16Is which took part in the initial attack, with another 14 SAMs fired during the subsequent attack flights, resulting in a total of 27 missiles fired on the attacking jets. (Ba'athist Syria) Israel responded by hitting 12 sites in Syria (8 Syrian & 4 Iranian; per Israel). Some opposition sources reported that Israel struck the following targets: (Ba'athist Syria) Mezzeh, Damascus: Mezzeh Military Airport.; (Ba'athist Syria) Serghaya, Rif Dimashq: A site of the Republican Guard.; (Ba'athist Syria) Madaya, Rif Dimashq: A site of the Republican Guard and other targets.; (Ba'athist Syria) Jabal Al-Mana, Rif Dimashq.; (Ba'athist Syria) Tal Abu Thaalib.; (Ba'athist Syria) Al-Dimas, Rif Dimashq.; (Ba'athist Syria) Qalamoun Mountains: A 16th Brigade's site which is one of the most important military points containing air defense systems.; (Ba'athist Syria) Al-Dreij, Rif Dimashq: A site belonging to the 104th Brigade of the Republican Guard.; (Ba'athist Syria) Alqeen, Daraa: The 156th Brigade; (Ba'athist Syria) Jabab, Daraa: The 79th Brigade and 89th Brigade.; (Ba'athist Syria) Izra, Daraa: 175th Brigade; (Ba'athist Syria) Khalkhalah, As-Suwayda: Regiment 159's Khalkhalah Military Airport.; (Syria) Qatana, Rif Dimashq: Wearhouses of the 10th Mechanised Division.; (Ba'athist Syria) As-Safira, Aleppo: Defense facilities for arms and ammunitions.; (Ba'athist Syria) Al-Nayrab, Aleppo: Aleppo International Airport.; (Ba'athist Syria) Jabal Azzan, Aleppo: An Iranian base. | (Israel) 2 soldiers wounded (Ba'athist Syria) 6–10 killed |
| 7 March 2018 | (Ba'athist Syria) Jabal al-Mana, Rif Dimashq: Correspondent of Orient News reported that Israeli forces targeted long-range missiles launchers of Toshka rockets which belong to Hezbollah, adding that two platforms were destroyed and resulted in the killing of large numbers of Hezbollah militants. The correspondent added that he heard the voices of ambulances who came to the place to transport the wounded to hospitals in Damascus. | |
| 25 March 2018 | Beqaa Valley: Arabic media outlets reported that Israeli jets struck a number of Hezbollah positions along the Lebanon-Syria border. Lebanese al-Jadeed news reported the loud sounds heard by residents of the area were not explosions, but Israeli planes breaking the sound barrier, causing sonic booms. Hezbollah-affiliated Al Manar denied the reports and said that neither Hezbollah or the Syrian army were attacked by Israeli forces. | |
| 31 March 2018 | (Lebanon) Khalit Maryam, Nabatieh: An Israeli Hermes 450 drone crashed due to a technical failure. An additional Israeli drone bombed the crashed drone. The Lebanese Army issued a statement saying that the crashed drone was found to be equipped with four unexploded ordnance. A technical unit of the Lebanese Army detonated it. (Ba'athist Syria) Jabab, Daraa: Correspondent of Orient News in the region reported Israeli airstrikes targeted a military site of the Iranian and regime militias belonging to the 89th Regiment of the 9th Armoured Division, reportedly after pro-Assad pages published pictures of military equipment which were destinated to reach Daraa. In addition, special sources had confirmed to Orient that the regime's militias had transferred chemicals to the site. Syrian official news agency SANA, citing its correspondent in Daraa, claimed that there is no truth to the reports by some media outlets about Israeli airstrikes on Syrian army sites in the north of the province. | |
| 16 April 2018 | The Syrian army reported that six missiles targeted Shayrat air base in Homs and three missiles targeted Dumayr airbase, and that the air defense systems intercepted nine of the missiles and accused the Israeli Air Force of attacking the air force. Later, they admitted that there had been no missile attack and that air defense systems had been activated as a result of a false alarm. They blamed Israel and the United States for electronic warfare that disrupted Syrian radar systems and caused a malfunction. | |
| 23 April 2018 | Golan Heights: An errant mortar shell which was fired from Quneitra countryside have landed near the security fence in the northern area. (Ba'athist Syria) al-Kawm, Quneitra: A Syrian military post was hit by precision artillery in retaliation of the IDF. Orient News's correspondent in the region reported that the Israel army shelled the artillery battalion of the Syrian army, which resulted in the destruction of artillery system within the battalion. | |
| 5 May 2018 | (Ba'athist Syria) Quneitra Governorate: Syrian opposition forces reported that they arrested a number of suspected Hezbollah members in the past week. The opposition forces posted a filmed confession of a suspect saying that he was awaiting orders to fire rockets at Israel. | 8 captured |
| 6 May 2018 | Arab media reported that eight members of the Syrian Air Force's 150th Air Defense Division were killed in a mysterious explosion in the morning on the Damascus-Suwayda road. Engineers and soldiers from the battalion, which is responsible for the operation of the anti-aircraft system S-200 and was responsible for the downing of the Israeli F-16 two months ago, took a transport vehicle and suddenly the explosion took place. According to Syrian sources, eight were killed and Israel was blamed for assassinating them. | (Ba'athist Syria) 8 soldiers killed |
| 8 May 2018 | (Ba'athist Syria) Al-Kiswah, Rif Dimashq: Israeli warplanes struck several military bases in Syria where there is significant Iranian presence. Two Israeli missiles that were targeting a weapons convoy at a base were downed near the al-Kiswah industrial zones close to Damascus. 9 Iranian or pro-Iranian militiamen were killed. | (Iran) 9 killed |
| 9–10 May 2018 | (Ba'athist Syria) Baath City, Quneitra: Israeli forces bombarded the area. Opposition-affiliated Al Jisr TV reported that Israel conducted a preemptive strike against a local Hezbollah cell which attempted to fire a Kornet anti-tank missile at an Israeli force patrolling in the Golan Heights. Golan Heights: Iranian elite forces on the Syrian-held side of the Golan Heights fired around 20 projectiles towards Israeli army positions. (Ba'athist Syria) Syria: Israel responded with rounds of rocket fire into Syria, striking over 50 Iranian targets. Twenty-three fighters, among them 18 foreigners, were killed in the Israeli strikes. Amikam Norkin, Israeli Air Force commander, said Israel used its F-35 stealth fighters for the first time. | (Ba'athist Syria) (Iran) 27 killed (11 Iranians, 10 other foreigners) |
| 17 May 2018 | Golan Heights: Local residents reported seeing an unidentified object being intercepted by the Iron Dome. The media initially reported that the reported object was a missile that was fired towards Israel, and later the media reported that it was actually a foreign drone. However, the Israeli army denied intercepting a missile or a drone, and claimed that the Iron Dome was triggered by a false alarm. | |
| 21 May 2018 | (Ba'athist Syria) Najha, Damascus: Sky News Arabia reported that massive explosions hit the Najha area, near Damascus International Airport, targeting a Syrian military academy that serves as an Iranian/HIzballah intelligence war room and an Iranian electronic warfare. | |
| 5 June 2018 | (Ba'athist Syria) Assal al-Ward, Rif Dimashq: Quoted local activists by Sky News Arabia said that violent explosions rocked the area after Israeli airstrikes attacked Hezbollah military positions and an arms depots. | |
| 11 June 2018 | (Ba'athist Syria) Al-Qutayfah, Rif Dimashq: A series of explosions hit structures in the area. Local sources claimed that it was caused by an airstrike by the Israeli Air Force, reportedly after Hezbollah and Iranian-backed militias had transported trucks of weapons and missiles to the area. Pro-government sources, however, claimed that the explosions occurred inside a warehouse of weapons and ammunition and the reason for this was the sudden rise in temperatures. There were conflicting reports about what was damaged in the incident; some reported that it was a missile factory, while others reported it was missile stockpiles belonging to the Syrian Army and Hezbollah. | |
| 14 June 2018 | (Ba'athist Syria) Qalamoun Mountains: Syrian sources reported that Israel conducted airstrikes against Hezbollah positions near the Lebanon–Syria border. | |
| 15 June 2018 | (Ba'athist Syria) Tell Fatima, Quneitra: Activists from northern Daraa reported that Israel fired surface-to-surface missiles towards the town, targeting sophisticated air defense systems which were handed over to the Lebanese Hezbollah militia by the Assad regime. Orient News's correspondent reported that the target was an Iran-affiliated Pantsir-S1 missile system which was set up on Fatima Hills. Activists reported that the town, which is one of the points of concentration of Shiite militias loyal to Iran, as well as the towns of Deir al-Adas, Tal Kurom and Tal Bazak, have been shelled by the Israeli army for about two months. | |
| 19 June 2018 | (Ba'athist Syria) Hader, Quneitra: An Israeli Skylark drone crashed. The IDF announced that the crash was due to a technical problem. | |
| 24 June 2018 | (Ba'athist Syria) Quneitra Governorate: The IDF fired a Patriot missile at a drone that was incoming towards the Israeli-occupied Golan Heights. The drone retreated and no interception was recorded. | |
| 26 June 2018 | (Ba'athist Syria) Damascus: Syrian official news agency SANA reported that two Israeli missiles struck near Damascus International Airport. Local activists claimed that Israeli warplanes targeted an Iranian cargo plane that was being unloaded at the airport. UK-Based SOHR chief, Rami Abdel Rahman, told AFP that the Israeli missiles hit arms depots for Hezbollah near the airport and that the Syrian air defense systems failed to prevent the Israeli attack. | |
| 3 July 2018 | (Ba'athist Syria) Mahajjah, Daraa: Explosions hit ammunition warehouses, of which the local residents claim are controlled by Iranian militias and Lebanese Hezbollah, and contain missiles and tank shells. Syrian opposition media reports claimed that the explosions were the result of an Israeli airstrike. Reportedly, the compound was completely destroyed and there were multiple casualties. | |
| 6 July 2018 | (Ba'athist Syria) Quneitra Governorate: Israeli forces struck a Syrian army post that was the source of a mortar shell which landed within the Syrian side of the border fence in the demilitarized zone, in violation of the Israel-Syria Separation of Forces Agreement-1974. The mortar shell is reportedly the result of a spillover due to fighting between the Syrian army and rebel groups in the area. | |
| 7 July 2018 | (Ba'athist Syria) Southern Syria: Arab sources reported that Israel air raids against an Iranian convoy resulted in the killing of Iranian-led and Hezbollah militants. | |
| 11–12 July 2018 | HaOn, Emek HaYarden: An Israeli Patriot missile intercepted a Syrian reconnaissance drone which infiltrated some 10 kilometers into northern Israel. Some parts of the UAV fell in the shore of the Sea of Galilee. It is estimated that this drone was an Iranian made Ababil model which was designed to fulfill reconnaissance, photography and assault missions. (Ba'athist Syria) Quneitra Governorate Around midnight, Israel warplanes attacked multiple positions of the Syrian army. The Israeli army acknowledged it had struck three Syrian military posts in retaliation to the drone that infiltrated into Israeli airspace. These Syrian military posts were reportedly used as observatory and intelligence posts by Iranian forces. Orient News' correspondent in Quneitra area quoted a source claiming that casualties occurred in the ranks Iranian Shia militias, Hezbollah, and Assad militias and that the resulted death toll is at least 7 members. | (Ba'athist Syria) (Iran) 7 killed |
| 13 July 2018 | (Ba'athist Syria) Bariqa, Quneitra: An Israeli Patriot missile intercepted a Syrian UAV over the Al-Rafid area in the buffer zone. | |
| 18 July 2018 | Golan Heights: Rockets sirents were heard overnight, and shortly afterwards the IDF released a statement claiming that these were false alarms. | |
| 22 July 2018 | (Ba'athist Syria) Masyaf, Hama: Syrian state-run news agency SANA reported that Israel targeted a military site. UK-based SOHR said that the airstriiek targeted an Iranian-supervised facility which manufactures surface-to-surface missiles. | |
| 23 July 2018 | (Ba'athist Syria) Quneitra Governorate: Israeli forces fired David's Sling interceptor missiles towards two SS-21 surface-to-surface missiles that Israeli forces feared may fall in Israeli-occupied territory. However, when the Syrian missiles approached the ceasefire line it became clear that they would not fall in Israeli-occupied territory, and therefore one of the interceptors was destroyed. | |
| 24 July 2018 | (Ba'athist Syria) Tasil, Daraa: Israel forces launched two Patriot missiles towards a Syrian Sukhoi Su-22 fighter jet, successfully intercepting it. Israel claimed it had penetrated what Israel considered its airspace on the Golan Heights by a margin of 2 kilometres. The Syrian government stated that the aircraft was flying on a mission against ISIL and other militants around Saida and was within Syrian airspace. The plane crashed on the Syrian side of the Heights. An Islamic State-affiliated news agency reported that the remains of the jet fell in Tasil. Sputnik reported that one pilot was killed in the incident and that the other one is lost. | (Ba'athist Syria) 1 pilot killed |
| 25 July 2018 | Two BM-21 Grad rockets landed in the Sea of Galilee. The rockets were initially thought to be a spillover of the fighting near the border, but were later believed to be an effort by the Islamic State group to draw Israel into a confrontation with the Syrian regime. (Ba'athist Syria) The Israeli army announced that its airforce struck the rocket launcher of which was the source of the fire into Israeli territory, and that using its artillery it struck targets in the vicinity of the area from which the rockets were launched. Local activists quoted by SMART News Agency said that the Israeli bombardment targeted positions of the Syrian regime forces in the villages of Ghadir al-Bustan and Qalaitra in Quneitra area. The Russian Defence Ministry thanked Israel for attacking the rocket launcher, adding that the attack resulted in the death of some Islamic State militants. | |
| 1 August 2018 | (Ba'athist Syria) Golan Heights, Quneitra: Israeli strikes targeted a group of ISIL fighters who had crossed the ceasefire line but did not yet cross the border fence, killing 7 militants. | (Islamic State) 7 killed |
| 23 December 2018 | The Israeli Defence Forces opened fire at a group of gunmen who crossed the 1974 ceasefire line and were approaching the border fence. The IDF worked to determine if the suspectss crossed the lines for intelligence-gathering purposes. | |
| 24 January 2019 | : The IDF Spokesperson's Unit reported that Israeli forces operating near the border with Syria were fired upon, and that the Israeli forces returned fire. | |
| 2 June 2019 | On 2 June in the early dawn, Israel struck several targets after two rockets were launched into the Golan Heights from the Syrian side of the border. Syrian state media reported that five Syrian soldiers were killed and seven were wounded in the strikes, while the Syrian Observatory for Human Rights reported that 10 were killed, seven of which were Iranian and Hezbollah militants. Israel said its air force struck a number of targets, including two artillery batteries, a number of observation posts near the border, and an air defense battery. | (Ba'athist Syria) 3-5 soldiers killed (Hezbollah) (Iran) 0-7 fighters killed |
| 2 August 2020 | Israeli forces opened fire killing four men laying explosives at a security fence along the Israeli-occupied sector of the Golan Heights. | |
| 11 May 2022 | Israeli planes strike a military target near Masyaf. SANA, a Syrian state media agency, reported that four soldiers and one civilian had been killed and seven wounded. SOHR said that all five victims were personnel on a Pantsir missile system. Channel 13 reported that the Russian Air Force had allegedly fired S-300s at Israeli jets in response. | (Ba'athist Syria) 4-5 soldiers killed, 0-1 civilians killed |
| 19 September 2022 | Israeli forces opened fire on four suspects close to the border fence who were throwing mines at the perimeter road, injuring one. The other three fled the scene. | |
| 29 January 2023 | Israeli soldiers fired at two armed individuals from Syria who approached the ceasefire line in the Golan Heights, killing one. The second man fled back deeper into Syria. | 1 killed |
| 8 April 2023 | Three rockets were launched from Syria towards the Golan, including one landing near Metzar, an Israeli settlement. | |
| 21 September 2023 | Israeli tanks shelled two Syrian army structures that violated the 1974 truce line. | |
| During Gaza war (October 2023–Present) | See Israeli violations of the Demilitarized Buffer Zone with Syria during Gaza war | |
| December 2024–Present | See 2024 Israeli invasion of Syria | 7 Syrians killed by Israeli forces. A number of Syrians arrested |

== Reactions ==
Israel – On 12 November 2012, Israeli prime minister Benjamin Netanyahu said "we are closely following the events and will respond accordingly," and that Israel "won't allow its borders to be breached or its citizens to be fired upon."

On 6 January 2013, it was reported that Israel would be building an improved security fence in the ceasefire line between the Israeli-occupied and Syrian-controlled zones of the Golan Heights. Netanyahu stated that the Syrian army had largely "backed off" from the area, leaving it in control of "global jihad operatives" and that the fence would protect the "Jewish state" from "infiltrations and terror". An Israeli security official stated that around 10 kilometres (6.2 mi) of the fence had already been completed, with approximately 60 kilometres (37 mi) remaining.

On 30 March 2018, Chief of General Staff of the Israel Defense Forces, Gadi Eizenkot, confirmed in an interview with Maariv that the Israeli Air Force continued to conduct operations in Syria since the February 2018 Israel–Syria incident.

On 22 May 2018, during a conference in Herzliya, a senior Israeli Air Force officer said that Israel continued to strike targets in Syria since the May 2018 Israel–Iran incidents.

German Magazine Contra questioned the occurrence of the attack alleging that "Israel has insisted that the S-300s wouldn't interfere with its ability to attack Syria, but in the space of over a month since then, not a single media report on such an attack has been made".

Russia – On 18 September 2018, after the downing of the Russian IL-20M, Vladimir Putin attributed it (sic) to a "chain of tragic circumstances" and denied that the IDF was involved in the crash.

(Ba'athist Syria) Syria – On 13 November 2012, the Syrian government, through the United Nations Disengagement Observer Force (UNDOF), pledged to halt firing toward Israeli territory.

Syrian opposition – In November 2012, Turkey's Anadolu news agency reported that the Free Syrian Army released a statement accusing Israel of attempting to "aid Assad's criminal regime" by firing into Syria.

== See also ==
- Iran–Israel conflict during the Syrian civil war
- Syrian civil war spillover in Lebanon
- Syrian–Turkish border clashes during the Syrian civil war
- History of the Arab–Israeli conflict
- War in Iraq (2013–2017)
- Gaza war
- Israel–Hezbollah conflict (2023–2024)
