= List of Syrian Air Force bases =

Syrian Arab Air Force القوات الجوية العربية السورية
- Founded: 1948–2024
- Country: Ba'athist Syria
- Part of: Former Ministry of Defense
- March: We are the Eagles
- Engagements: 1948 Arab-Israeli War; Six-Day War; Yom Kippur War; Lebanese Civil War; 1982 Lebanon War; Syrian Civil War; War in Iraq (2013–2017)

Commanders
- Commander-in-Chief: Marshal Bashar al-Assad
- Minister of Defence: Lieutenant General Ali Mahmoud Abbas
- Commander-in-Chief: Major General Tawfiq Khaddour

Insignia
- Roundel

- Air Force Ensign

Aircraft flown
- Fighter: MiG-21, MiG-23, MiG-29
- Helicopter: Mil Mi-14, Mil Mi-17, Mil Mi-8, Mil Mi-2, Kamov Ka-28, Kamov Ka-226
- Attack helicopter: Mil Mi-24, Gazelle
- Interceptor: MiG-25
- Reconnaissance: PA-31
- Trainer: MBB 223 Flamingo, Aero L-39 Albatros, MFI-17 Mushshak
- Transport: Il-76, An-24, An-26, Mi-8

This article lists air bases formerly operated or used by the Syrian Arab Air Force.

== List ==
Name	Location served	Runways	Shelters	Squadrons	Coordinates
Al-Qusayr Military Airbase (Note: Also known as Dabaa Military Airbase.)	al-Qusayr, al-Qusayr Subdistrict, al-Qusayr District, Homs Governorate	1	16	825 Squadron MiG-21Bis; 826 Squadron	34°34′08″N 36°34′22″E
Al-Nasiriyah Military Airbase	Al-Nasiriyah, Jayroud Subdistrict, al-Qutayfah District, Rif-Dimashq Governorate	1	20	695 Squadron MiG-23BN/UB; 698 Squadron MiG-23BN/UB	33°55′08″N 36°51′59″E
Al-Tha'lah Military Airbase	Tha'lah, Suwayda Subdistrict, Suwayda District, Suwayda Governorate	2	16	765 Squadron Mi-25; 766 Squadron Mi-25	32°42′19″N 36°24′46″E
Al-Dumayr Military Airport	al-Dumayr, al-Dumayr Subdistrict, Duma District, Rif Dimashq Governorate	1	52	67 Squadron MiG-23ML; 54 Squadron Su-22M-2	33°36′35″N 36°44′56″E
Hama Military Airport	Hama, Hama Subdistrict, Hama District, Hama Governorate	1	20	679 Squadron MiG-21MF/UM; 680 Squadron MiG-21MF/UM ? Squadron MiG-29	35°07′05″N 36°42′40″E
Jirah Military Airbase	Jirah, al-Khafsah Subdistrict, Manbij District, Aleppo Governorate	1	12	2 Squadron L-39ZA ? Squadron L-39ZA	36°05′48″N 37°56′11″E
Khalkhalah Military Airbase	Khalkhalah, Surah Saghirah Subdistrict, Shahba District, Suwayda Governorate	2	30	945 Squadron MiG-21Bis; 946 Squadron MiG-21Bis	33°03′40″N 36°33′08″E
Marj Ruhayyil Military Airbase	Marj Ruhayyil, Kisweh Subdistrict, Rif-Dimashq Governorate	1	24	54 Squadron MiG-23ML; 77 Squadron MiG-23ML/UM; 767 Squadron Mi-25	33°17′11″N 36°27′26″E
Marj al-Sultan Military Heliport	Marj al-Sultan, al-Nashabiyah Subdistrict, Douma District, Rif Dimashq Governorate	1	0	525 Squadron Mi-8 Hip C/H; 537 Squadron Mi-8 Hip C/H; 909 Squadron (VIP) Mi-8 ? Squadron Mi-8 Hip H/J/K	33°29′13″N 36°28′31″E; 33°30′01″N 36°28′00″E
Mezzeh Military Airport	Mezzeh, Rif-Dimashq Governorate	1	22	976 Squadron SA-324-L; 977 Squadron SA-324-L	33°28′39″N 36°13′24″E
Menagh Military Airbase	Menagh, Azaz Subdistrict, Azaz District, Aleppo Governorate	2	0	4 Squadron Mi-8 Hip C, MBB 223 Flamingo	36°31′17″N 37°02′29″E
Qabr al-Sitt Military Heliport	Beit Sahem, Babbila Subdistrict, Markaz Rif Dimashq District, Rif-Dimashq Governorate	1	0	532 Squadron Mi-2, Mi-8 Hip C/H	33°27′30″N 36°21′23″E
Al-Seen Military Airbase (Note: Also known as Sayqal Military Airbase)	Sayqal, al-Dumayr Subdistrict, Rif-Dimashq Governorate	2	44	697 Squadron MiG-29; 698 Squadron MiG-29; 699 Squadron MiG-29	33°40′56″N 37°12′50″E
Shayrat Air Base	Shayrat, al-Riqama Subdistrict, Homs Governorate	2	40	675 Squadron MiG-23MF/UM; 677 Squadron Su-22M-2; 685 Squadron Su-22M-4	34°29′24″N 36°54′32″E
Tabqa Military Airbase	Tabqa, Tabqa Subdistrict, Raqqa Governorate	1	18	12 Squadron MiG-21MF/UM; 24 Brigade Mi-8	35°45′17″N 38°34′00″E
Taftanaz Military Airbase	Taftanaz, Taftanaz Subdistrict, Idlib District, Idlib Governorate	1	0	253 Squadron Mi-8 Hip C/H; 255 Squadron Mi-8 Hip C/H	35°58′20″N 36°46′59″E
Tiyas Military Airbase (T4)	Tiyas, al-Qaryatayn Subdistrict, Homs District, Homs Governorate	1	60	1 Squadron MiG-25PD/PU/RB; 5 Squadron MiG-25PD/PU/RB; 819 Squadron Su-24MK; 827 Squadron Su-22M-4	34°31′21″N 37°37′47″E
Al-Nayrab Military Airbase	Aleppo, Aleppo Governorate	1			36°11′05″N 37°12′57″E
Kuweires Military Airbase	Aleppo, Aleppo Governorate	1			36°11′13″N 37°34′59″E
Abu al-Duhur Air Base	Abu al-Duhur, Idlib Governorate	2			35°43′55″N 37°06′15″E

== See also ==
- List of airports in Syria
- Syrian Arab Air Force
- Military of Syria
