= Al-Kawm =

Al-Kawm, Syria may refer to:

- El Kowm (archaeological site)
- Al-Kawm, Homs
- Al-Kawm, Quneitra
