= Operation House of Cards =

2018 confrontation between Israel and Iran

- Part of Israeli–Syrian border incidents and the Iran–Israel conflict during the Syrian civil war
- Location: Syria and the Israeli-occupied Golan Heights
- Planned by: Israel
- Target: Islamic Republic of Iran Army (Quds Force); Syrian Arab Armed Forces
- Date: 10 May 2018
- Executed by: Israeli Air Force
- Casualties: 27 killed (SOHR claim); 4 killed (Syrian claim); 4 SAM systems (Israeli claim)

On 10 May 2018, Israel stated that Iranian forces in Syria launched 20 rockets against Israeli army positions on the western Golan Heights. The Syrian Observatory for Human Rights said that the attack occurred after Madinat al-Baath, a town in the demilitarised zone, was bombarded by Israeli forces. According to the Israel Defense Forces (IDF) some missiles were intercepted by Israel's Iron Dome system, while some fell short in Syrian territory.

Following this, Israel launched an extensive strike in Syria against Iranian targets, called Operation House of Cards (Hebrew: מִבְצָע בֵּית הַקְלָפִים; mivtza beit haKlafim) targeting Iranian military bases in Syria. Syria state media called the attacks an act of Israeli aggression on Syrian territories. Iran denied Israeli claims, stating it had neither fired rockets against Israel nor had any military bases in Syria. During the operation, the Israel Air Force destroyed a number of Syrian air defense batteries, including a Pantsir-S1 system, a S-75 Dvina system, a S-200 missile system radar, and a Buk missile system.

The clash came during rising tensions between Israeli and Iranian forces in Syria, including threats by the leader of Iran's Quds Force in Syria, Qasem Soleimani, to attack Israel. The incidents also came just a day after the US announced it was withdrawing from the Iranian nuclear deal.

== Background ==
On 10 February 2018, an Israeli F-16I was shot down by the Syrian air defenses after conducting an air raid on Iran-backed positions inside Syrian territory. The aircraft was part of a larger Israeli aerial dispatch which Israel said was sent in response to detection of an Iranian drone entering Israeli airspace. Two hours after the downing of the jet, Israel began attacking additional targets inside Syria, including air defense sites.

On 9 April, Israeli aircraft targeted the T-4 air base in the Syrian province of Homs, killing up to 14 soldiers, including seven Iranians, two days after a reported chemical attack was carried out by the Syrian government.

On 30 April 2018, Israeli Prime Minister Benjamin Netanyahu accused Iran of pursuing a program of nuclear weapons development.

On 8 May 2018, U.S. President Donald Trump announced that the U.S. would withdraw from the Joint Comprehensive Plan of Action. The same day Israeli air strikes targeted Syrian army positions in the southern Damascus area of Al-Kiswah, killing 15 people, including 8 Iranians according to the Syrian Observatory for Human Rights. According to reports, the targets were Iranian rocket launchers aimed at Israeli territory.

== Events ==
On 10 May, Iranian forces on the Syrian-held side of the Golan Heights reportedly fired around 20 Fajr-5 rockets towards Israeli army positions, though there were no damage or injuries. Abolfazl Hassanbeigi, Vice Chairman of Iran's Supreme National Security Council denied Iran was behind the rocket attack on Israel, stating that "Teheran has nothing to do with the missiles launched at Israel from Syria overnight Wednesday". According to the Fox News the Iranian missile barrage was done without the notification of the Syrian government.

The Israeli army stated that in response, it launched "Operation House of Cards", the "most extensive strike in Syria in decades", attacking dozens of alleged Iranian targets. According to Russia's Defense Ministry, this involved 28 warplanes and the firing of 70 missiles.

According to Israeli sources, the targets hit by Israel, included Iranian intelligence sites operated by the Quds Force.

- Logistics headquarters of the Quds Force.
- A military compound and logistics complex of the Quds Force in Kiswah.
- An Iranian military camp north of Damascus.
- Weapons storage sites belonging to the Quds Force at Damascus International Airport.
- Intelligence systems and installations associated with the Quds Force.
- Observation, military posts and weapons in the buffer zone.
- In addition, the Iranian launcher from which missiles were fired at the Golan Heights was destroyed.

The Israel Air Force hit Syrian air defense batteries (SA-5 radar, SA-2, SA-22, SA-17) belonging to the Syrian army, that fired surface-to-air missiles on Israeli warplanes. The Britain-based Syrian Observatory for Human Rights estimated that at least 23 soldiers were killed in Israeli attacks, 5 Syrians and 18 "foreigners". The IDF estimated that nearly all Iranian infrastructure in Syria was hit.

After the incidents, Israeli Defence Minister Avigdor Lieberman said, "I hope we finished this chapter, and everyone got the message". Iranian Ayatollah Ahmad Khatami said, "The holy system of the Islamic Republic will step up its missile capabilities day by day so that... if [Israel] does anything foolish, we will raze Tel Aviv and Haifa to the ground." On May 22, Israel's air force commander, Major General Amikam Norkin, reported that Iran fired 32 rocket at Israel during the incidents, while more than 100 surface-to-air missiles were fired from Syria against Israeli jets. He also stated that IAF used its F-35 stealth fighters to attack Iranian targets, making Israel the first country in the world to carry out an operational attack with such aircraft.

== Reactions ==
- Iran: Iran denied Israel's allegations that it launched rocket attacks on its forces in the occupied Golan Heights, calling the claims "fabricated" and "baseless".
- United States: White House Press Secretary Sarah Sanders supported the Israeli strikes and said that it "absolutely has a sovereign right to defend itself. The Iranian regime's deployment into Syria of offensive rocket and missile systems aimed at Israel is an unacceptable and highly dangerous development for the entire Middle East. Iran's Islamic Revolutionary Guard Corps (IRGC) bears full responsibility for the consequences of its reckless actions." The White House also demanded that the IRGC and Hezbollah "refrain from any further provocations", and called on "all nations to make clear that Iran's actions pose a severe threat to international peace and stability."
- France: The French Foreign Ministry said its country has an "unwavering commitment to Israel's security" and that it "condemns any attempt to undermine it". It called on both Israel and Iran to exercise restraint, while demanding that "Iran refrain from any military provocation" and "warned it against any temptation toward regional hegemony".
- United Kingdom: British Prime Minister Theresa May's spokesman condemned Iran's attack on Israel and asserted that "Israel has every right to defend itself. We call on Iran to refrain from any further attacks and for calm on all sides. We call on Russia to use its influence in Syria to prevent further Iranian attacks."
- Germany: The German Foreign Ministry said: "We are deeply concerned by reports about last night's Iranian rocket attacks on Israeli army outposts. These attacks are a severe provocation that we most strongly condemn. We have always emphasized that Israel has the right to defend itself. At the same time, it is key that the situation does not escalate any further. This particularly means we must do everything we can to finally arrive to a sustainable political solution to the conflict in Syria — it is needed to end the suffering of the Syrian population and to not further threaten stability in the region."
- China: Geng Shuang, spokesman for the Chinese Foreign Ministry, stated "We have taken note of all the relevant reports and hope that all the parties concerned will remain calm, show restraint and make joint efforts to achieve regional peace and stability."
- Bahrain: The Bahraini foreign minister issued a statement supporting Israel's right to self defense from Iranian aggression.
- Hamas: Hamas condemned "the continuation of the occupation army targeting the Palestinian people and the countries of the region and its escalation on Syrian territory." Hamas said in a press statement that targeting was proof that the occupation was "the main enemy of the nation and the greatest threat to it and the source of terrorism in the region". The movement stressed that it is "the right of the Arab and Islamic countries to defend their territories and respond strongly to any aggression. This requires harnessing all the nation's energies and capabilities to deter the enemy and break its prestige and thwart its plans aimed at the Palestinian cause and the region and the nation's capabilities."

== See also ==
- Israeli involvement in the Syrian Civil War
- March 2017 Israel–Syria incident
- February 2018 Israel–Syria incident
- September 2018 Syria missile strikes
