= Tal al-Sha'ar =

Hill in Quneitra, Syria

- تل الشعار
- Location within Syria

Highest point
- Coordinates: 33.1734458°N 35.9440074°E

Tal al-Sha'ar (Arabic: تل الشعار) is a hill located in the northern part of the Quneitra Governorate in southern Syria, near the town of Jabah. The hill has held strategic significance over the years due to its elevation and proximity to the Syrian border with the Israeli-occupied Golan Heights.

== History ==
Under the rule of the Ba'athist regime in Syria, Tal al-Sha'ar was used as a military observation point. The hill's location made it valuable for monitoring activities in the area.

In 2024 during the Syrian civil war, Russia established a military police post there to oversee border activities and monitor any possible violations from both sides of it. This move was part of Russia's broader military involvement in Syria.

== Attacks ==
Tal al-Sha'ar has been targeted by multiple Israeli Air Force strikes and missile attacks since the beginning of the Syrian civil war. And the attacks continued even after the fall of the Assad regime.

== See also ==
- Iran–Israel conflict during the Syrian civil war
- Israeli–Syrian ceasefire line incidents during the Syrian civil war
- 2024 Israeli invasion of Syria
