= February 2018 Israel–Syria incident =

2018 air attack

Coordinates: 34.5225°N 37.62972°E

- Part of Israeli–Syrian border incidents and the Iran–Israel conflict during the Syrian civil war
Date	10 February 2018
Location	Syria, Israel
Result	Inconclusive: Per IAF, Iranian drone shot down after entering Israeli airspace; Israel responds by striking the Tiyas Military Airbase in Syria; Downing of Israeli F-16 jet by the Syrian Air Defense; Per IAF, Israeli fighter jets attack additional sites, bringing the total to 12 being hit

Belligerents
Israel	(Ba'athist Syria) Syria; Iran

Units involved
(Israel) Israeli Defence Forces; Israeli Air Force	Syrian Armed Forces; Syrian Air Force; Syrian Air Defense Force; Syrian Army; National Defence Forces

Strength
(Israel) 8 F-16 jets (Israel) 1 AH-64 helicopter	Unknown number of air defense systems and SAM batteries including S-200, SA-17, SA-6 and SA-3 (Iran) 1 Saegheh (UAV)

Casualties and losses
(Israel) 2 pilots wounded (Israel) 1 F-16 shot down	6–10 soldiers and militiamen killed 8 sites hit (Iran) 1 drone shot down (Iran) 4 sites hit

On 10 February 2018, an Israeli F-16 was shot down by the Syrian air defenses after conducting an air raid on Iran-backed positions inside Syrian territory. The aircraft was part of a larger Israeli aerial dispatch which Israel said was sent in response to detection of an Iranian drone spying on Israel. Two hours after the downing of the jet, Israel began attacking additional targets inside Syria, including air defense sites and Iranian targets near Damascus. Israel stated it destroyed the Syrian military's main command and control bunker. Iran dismissed the Israeli allegation of Iranian drone incursion into Israeli territory as "ridiculous".

It was the first time Israel and Iran confronted each other directly since the Iranian Revolution of 1979 and since the beginning of the Iran–Israel proxy conflict. Israel stated that it was "the biggest and most significant attack the air force has conducted against Syrian air defenses since the 1982 Lebanon War". Hezbollah said that the downing of the F-16 was the beginning of "a new strategic phase", as it was the first occasion on which Israel lost a jet to an enemy combatant since 1982.

== Timeline ==
At 4:30 am on 10 February 2018, an Israeli AH-64 Apache helicopter shot down an Iranian-produced copy of the RQ-170 drone (Saegheh) near the northern town of Beit Shean. The Iranian drone was sighted taking off from a base in Syria, flew along the Jordanian border, and was intercepted 90 seconds after crossing the Israeli border. Israeli journalist Ron Ben-Yishai said that the Iranian drone was sent to test if the Israeli air defense systems could detect a stealth drone – a test which had failed.

In response to the sighting of the drone crossing the Israeli border, 8 F-16Is of the Israeli Air Force (IAF) struck Tiyas Military Airbase from which the Israeli military said the drone had launched, very likely with standoff weapons. This base was attacked by the IAF in the past (March 2017), despite warnings from Russia due to its proximity to Russian military personnel. The attack prompted a response from Syrian Air Defense systems, which after firing on the Israeli jets, shot down an Israeli F-16I fighter jet over northern Israel. Two weeks later, Israeli Defense Forces (IDF) stated that the F-16I was hit by a S-200 surface-to-air missile (SAM) with the crew failing to take proper evasive actions. The same statement reported that 13 SAMs had been fired at the 8 F-16Is which took part in the initial attack, with another 14 SAMs fired during the subsequent attack flights, resulting in a total of 27 missiles fired on the attacking jets.

The F-16I was flying at high altitude to verify the results of the strike on Syrian targets, which made it easy to track by Syrian air defenses.

== Aftermath ==
Sirens were heard in the early morning in northern Israel and flights at Tel Aviv's international airport were briefly halted. Israeli Prime Minister Benjamin Netanyahu held security consultations following the incident, and Israel conducted several attacks against the Syrian Aerial Defense System and targets which Israel says are Iranian targets in Syria in response to the downing of the F-16. The Wall Street Journal cited Syrian media reporting that 25 people were killed by the Israel airstrikes.

Prime Minister of Israel Benjamin Netanyahu said "They dispatched an Iranian drone from Syrian territory into Israel. ... Israel holds Iran and its Syrian hosts responsible."

The Syrian Assistant Foreign Minister, Ayman Sussan said that they "have full confidence the aggressor will be greatly surprised, because it thought this war—this war of attrition Syria has been exposed to for years—had made it incapable of confronting attacks." He said Israel will meet new surprises should they attack Syrian again.

In Syria the events were viewed as a game-changer given that it was the first time the Syrian government made good on promises to respond to violation of its territory. The government supporters celebrated the downing of the Israeli jet and hailed the Syrian army and President Bashar Assad.

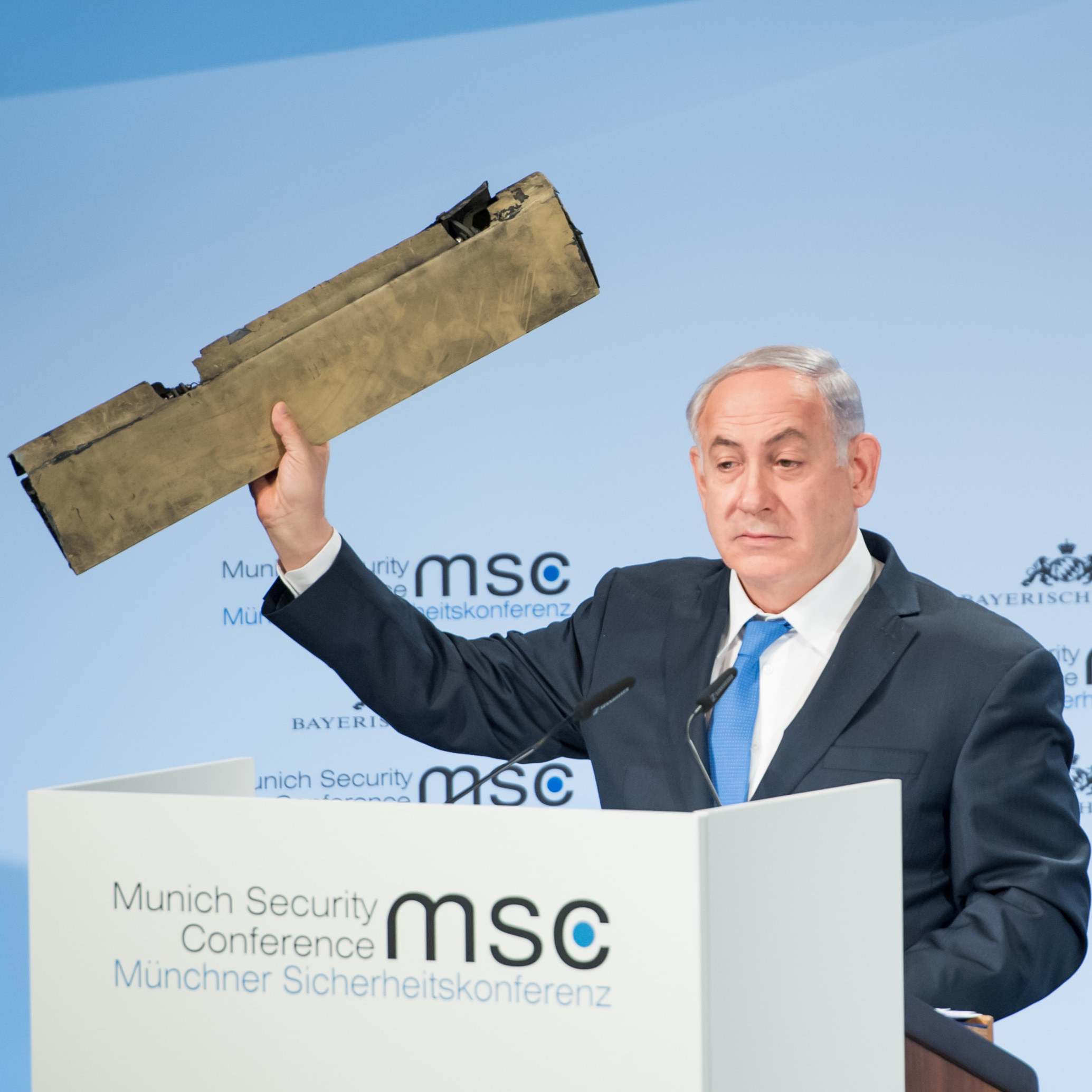
Benjamin Netanyahu presents an object that he described as part of the downed Iranian drone at the Munich Security Conference.

At the Munich Security Conference, Netanyahu showed an object that he said was part of the downed drone.

== Strategic significance ==
This incident is extremely unusual, as it is the first time Israel and Iran confronted each other directly since the Iranian Revolution of 1979 and since the beginning of the Iran–Israel proxy conflict. Israel stated that it was "the biggest and most significant attack the air force has conducted against Syrian air defenses since the 1982 Lebanon War". Hezbollah said that the downing of the F-16 is the beginning of "a new strategic phase", as it was the first occasion on which Israel lost a jet to an enemy combatant, since 1982.

Hezbollah suggested that the incident put an end to Israel's long-standing air superiority.

An Israeli army assessment stated that the twelve retaliatory air strikes destroyed nearly half of Syria's aerial defense systems. A day earlier, the Israeli military put the number of destroyed aerial defense batteries at three.

On 14 February, Haaretz reported that the Israeli strikes only ended after an afternoon phone call between Vladimir Putin and Benjamin Netanyahu.

== Reactions ==
- Israel: Prime Minister Benjamin Netanyahu stated "Israel wants peace but we will continue to defend ourselves with determination against any attack on us and against any attempt by Iran to entrench itself militarily in Syria or anywhere else."
- Syria: The Ministry of Defense stated "The Israeli enemy has resumed its aggression against some military positions in the southern region. Our air defenses have been attacked and the aggression has been thwarted".
- Iran: The Ministry of Foreign Affairs spokesman Bahram Qasemi was quoted saying "Reports of downing an Iranian drone flying over Israel and also Iran's involvement in attacking an Israeli jet are so ridiculous... Iran only provides military advice to Syria."
- United States: "The Department of Defense did not participate in this military operation... Israel is our closest security partner in the region and we fully support Israel's inherent right to defend itself against threats to its territory and its people."
- Russia: The Ministry of Foreign Affairs stated that "of particular concern is the danger of escalation of tension within and around de-escalation zones in Syria, the creation of which has become an important factor in reducing violence on Syrian soil. We urge all parties involved to exercise restraint and to avoid any actions that could lead to an even greater complication of the situation. We consider it necessary to unconditionally respect the sovereignty and territorial integrity of Syria and other countries of the region. It is absolutely unacceptable to create threats to the lives and security of Russian servicemen who are in Syria at the invitation of its legitimate government to assist in the fight against terrorists."
- United Kingdom: Foreign Secretary Boris Johnson issued a response, expressing concern at the developments, but supporting Israel's right to defend itself: "We support Israel's right to defend itself against any incursions into its territory. We are concerned at the Iranian actions, which detract from efforts to get a genuine peace process underway. We encourage Russia to use its influence to press the regime and its backers to avoid provocative actions and to support de-escalation in pursuit of a broader political settlement," said Johnson.
- Hezbollah: Hezbollah hailed Syria's response to Israel's attack on Iranian and Syrian bases in Syria, saying it signals "a new strategic phase" that puts an end to violation of Syrian territories.
- Lebanon: The Ministry of Foreign Affairs and Emigrants condemned "the raids on Syria" and stressed the right of "legitimate self-defense against any Israeli aggression." The statement added that "this aggressive policy practiced by Israel threatens stability in the region," calling on "the countries concerned to rein in Israel to stop its aggression."
- United Nations: Secretary-General António Guterres said he was following closely the alarming military escalation throughout Syria and the dangerous spillover across its borders and called for an immediate and unconditional de-escalation of violence in Syria.

== See also ==
- Israeli involvement in the Syrian Civil War
- Israeli–Syrian ceasefire line incidents during the Syrian Civil War
- List of aviation shootdowns and accidents during the Syrian Civil War
- List of the Israel Defense Forces operations
- March 2017 Israel–Syria incident
- May 2018 Israel–Iran incidents
- Syria missile strikes (September 2018)
- Quneitra Governorate clashes (2024)
