= Samadanieh al-Sharqiyeh =

Town in Quneitra, Syria

Samadanieh al-Sharqiyeh صمدانية الشرقية
- Village
- Location in Syria
- Coordinates: 33.1567463°N 35.8857797°E
- Country: Syria
- Governorate: Quneitra Governorate
- District: Quneitra District

Samadanieh al-Sharqiyeh (Arabic: صمدانية الشرقية) is a village in the Quneitra Governorate of southern Syria. It is south of the towns of Khan Arnabah and Madinat al-Baath, and near the Israeli-occupied Golan Heights.

== Attacks ==
During the Syrian civil war, Samadanieh al-Sharqiyeh became a site of clashes between forces loyal to the Assad regime and the opposition in 2017.

After a stray mortar shell from fighting in Syria landed in an open area in the northern Israeli-occupied Golan Heights, the Israeli Air Force targeted Assad-regime forces in Samadanieh al-Sharqiyeh, which caused damage and destroyed mortar launchers.

== See also ==
- Israeli occupation of the Golan Heights
- Israeli–Syrian ceasefire line incidents during the Syrian civil war
