= Khalkhalah Military Airbase =

Syrian Airforce Base

Khalkhalah Military Airbase مطار خلخلة العسكري
- IATA: none; ICAO: OS69

Summary
- Airport type: Military
- Owner: (Syria) Syrian Armed Forces
- Operator: Syrian Air Force
- Location: Khalkhalah, As-Suwayda, Syria
- Elevation AMSL: 2,310 ft (700 m)
- Coordinates: 33°03′41″N 36°33′08″E

Map
- Location in Syria

Khalkhalah Military Airbase (Arabic: مطار خلخلة العسكري) is an air base operated by the Syrian Air Force. It is located near the village of Khalkhalah in As-Suwayda Governorate. The base consists of two runways, one measuring 3 kilometers and the other 2.8 kilometers in length. It also houses twenty helicopters and thirty aircraft hangars.

== History ==
The base was attacked by the Islamic State of Iraq and Syria in April 2015.

The base was bombed by the Israel Defense Forces in February 2025.

== See also ==
- List of Syrian Air Force bases
