= Fatima Hills =

Hills in Quneitra, Syria

- تلال فاطمة
- Location within Syria

Highest point
- Coordinates: 33.1411203°N 36.0840375°E

Geography
- Location: Southwestern Syria

Fatima Hills (Arabic: تلال فاطمة) (Note: Sometimes written as "تلول فاطمة") are a series of strategic hills located in southwestern Syria, overseeing borders of the Israeli-occupied Golan Heights. The hills hold significant military and religious importance and have been the focus of various regional conflicts.

== Location and geography ==
The Fatima Hills are situated approximately 15 kilometers from the borders of the Golan Heights. They are strategically located, providing a commanding view of the surrounding area, making them one of the most important military vantage points in southern Syria.

== Strategic and religious significance ==
The Fatima Hills hold dual significance:

- Religious Importance: The hills are linked to religious narratives associated with Fatima al-Zahra', the daughter of the Prophet Muhammad. Some traditions claim she passed through these hills, giving them symbolic importance for certain groups.
- Military Importance: Due to their elevation and location, the Fatima Hills are considered a critical strategic point for military operations in southern Syria.

== History ==
=== Pre-2011 ===
Before the Syrian civil war, the Fatima Hills had a known military presence. Reports indicate that the Iranian Islamic Revolutionary Guard Corps fortified the area between 2004 and 2006 with missile platforms and a helicopter landing pad. Syrian military officials frequently inspected the site during that period.

=== Post-2011 ===
During the Syrian Civil War, the Fatima Hills became a key site for Iranian-backed militias. In February 2015, Liwa Fatemiyoun seized control of the hills after battles with opposition forces. The hills served as a base for several militias, including:

- Hezbollah
- Liwa Fatemiyoun
- Harakat Hezbollah al-Nujaba
- The Mahdi Shiraz Missile Division

These groups used the Fatima Hills as a command center for regional military operations.

=== Role in the Syrian-Israeli conflict ===
The hills' proximity to the Golan Heights has made them a focal point of tensions between Syria and Israel. Israeli airstrikes frequently targeted the area to disrupt Iranian military activity. The site also includes an abandoned Israeli military hospital from the Six-Day War in 1967, which was later repurposed by Iranian forces as a military facility.

=== 2018 Reconciliation agreement ===
In July 2018, a reconciliation agreement was reached in southern Syria, brokered by Russia and Israel. As part of the agreement, Iranian and Hezbollah forces were required to withdraw 52 kilometers away from the Golan Heights. Despite this, they maintained a presence in the Fatima Hills due to its strategic importance.

At the time, the Syrian government, with support from Iran, fortified the Fatima Hills by constructing new defensive positions and establishing a medical facility for military personnel. Advanced missile systems, such as "Zelzal" missiles, were also deployed in the area under the oversight of Hezbollah commanders.

== Current status ==
In November 2024, Hezbollah completed its withdrawal from the Fatima Hills and relocated to southern Lebanon. The move was likely motivated by concerns over potential Israeli strikes targeting the area.

During the fall of the Assad regime, all Iranian forces and Iranian-backed militias were withdrawn from Syria.

== See also ==
- Iranian intervention in the Syrian civil war
