= March 2017 Israel–Syria incident =

2017 incident between Israel and Syria

Israel border incidents during Syrian Civil War
- Part of Israeli–Syrian border incidents and the Iran–Israel conflict during the Syrian civil war
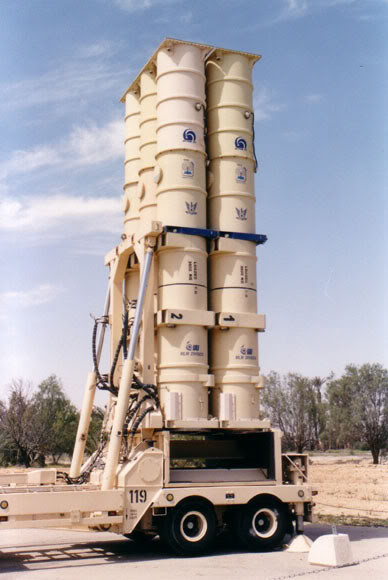
- An Israeli Arrow 2 missile launcher, similar to one used at the beginning of the current Israeli/Syrian conflict
Date	17 March 2017
Location	Golan Heights
Result	Inconclusive: According to Syria one Israeli fighter jet shot down by its Air Defense; One Syrian missile had been shot down by an Arrow 2 missile

Belligerents
Israel	Syria

Units involved
Israel Defense Forces; Israeli Air Force	Syrian Armed Forces; Syrian Air Defense Force

Casualties and losses
(Israel) 1 fighter jet shot down and another damaged (Syrian claim)	Unknown

The March 2017 Israel–Syria incident took place on 17 March 2017, when Israeli Air Force struck a target in Syria. In response the Syrian Army fired several S-200 missiles at Israeli jets above Golan Heights. Israel reported that one Syrian missile had been shot down by an Arrow 2 missile, while none of its aircraft had been damaged. Israel stated it was targeting weapon shipments headed toward anti-Israeli forces, specifically Hezbollah, in Lebanon, while the Syrian Army claimed that a military site near Palmyra had been struck.

Syria claimed to have shot down one Israeli aircraft. Israel denied Syria's claim that one jet fighter was shot down and another damaged. Israel has not reported any pilots or aircraft missing in Syria, or anywhere else in the Middle East following the incident. Also, neither Syria nor Hezbollah have shown photos or video of downed Israeli aircraft or personnel. According to some sources, the incident was the first time Israeli officials clearly confirmed an Israeli strike against Hezbollah during the Syrian Civil War.

Following a generic statement by the Israeli Defense Forces reading "Several anti-aircraft missiles were launched from Syria following the mission, and IDF aerial defense systems intercepted one of the missiles. At no point was the safety of Israeli civilians or the IAF aircraft compromised", several news reports started speculating about the use of the Arrow system to defend jet fighters from hostile surface to air missiles. However, other Israeli news publications confirmed that the initial reading of the IDF statement was wrong; in fact, the IDF said that the jet fighters were never in danger and the missiles were far from the planes. But the IDF detected Syrian S-200 missiles on course to reach Israel, so the Arrow missile system was used to prevent them falling on settled areas. Indeed, a S-200, after losing its target, hence going ballistic, has approximately the size, the speed and the range of a battlefield artillery rocket such as the FROG-7, which is one of the very standard targets the Israeli missile defense is shaped around. The Jordanian Armed Forces reported that a part of the Arrow missile fell in its territory. There were no casualties in Jordan.

== Aftermath ==
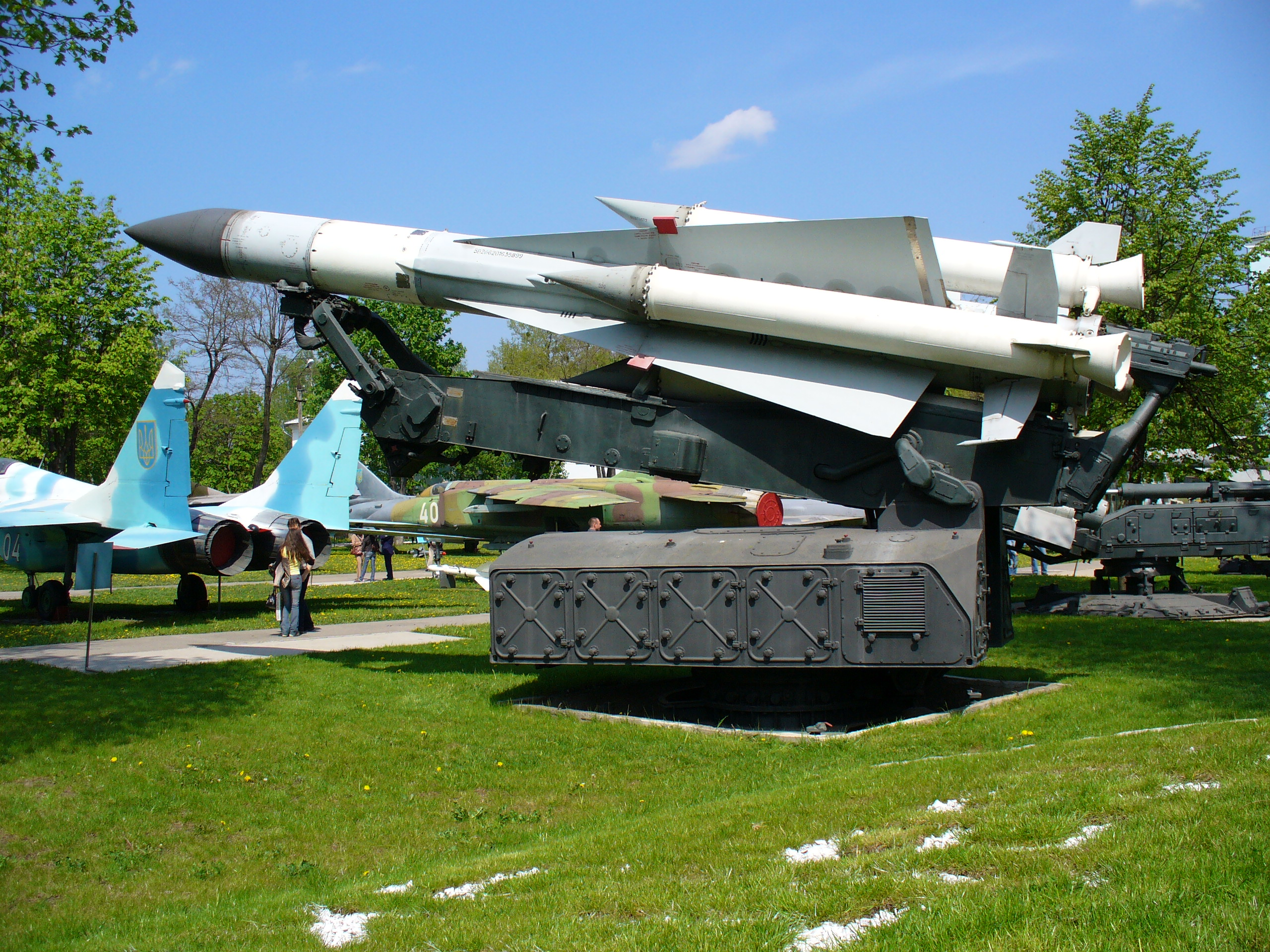
S-200 missile, similar to the ones fired at Israeli Air Force fighter jets, seen here in a Ukrainian museum

On 19 March 2017, Israeli defense minister Avigdor Lieberman said that if Syria uses its air defense system against Israeli aircraft again, Israel will respond by targeting Syrian air defense systems.

On 19 March, an Israeli Skylark drone crashed in Syria reportedly due to human error. There were further reports on alleged Israeli airstrikes on 22 March 2017, with another round of bombings carried out on suspected Hezbollah targets near Damascus.

On 25 March 2017, the Syrian government said that it will respond to future Israeli strikes on Syrian military targets with Scud missile attacks against IDF bases, and also it will retaliate against future strikes on Syrian civilian targets by firing Scud missiles at the Israeli city of Haifa.

== See also ==
- February 2018 Israel–Syria incident
