= Qers al-Nafl =

Hill in Quneitra, Syria

- قرص النفل

Geography
- Location: Quneitra Governorate, Syria

Qers al-Nafl (Arabic: قرص النفل) is a hill located in the northern part of Quneitra Governorate in southern Syria. The hill overlooks the Israeli-occupied Golan Heights, and serves as an observation and military point in the region.

== Strategic importance ==
Qers al-Nafl's location offers direct views of Majdal Shams and Israeli supply lines toward the Lebanese border. Due to its elevation and vantage point, it is considered a key position for monitoring and controlling movements in southern Syria and northern Israel.

== History ==
=== Syrian civil war ===
The hill witnessed military activity during the Syrian civil war when it had a Hezbollah presence. In April 2023, Israeli forces shelled positions held by Syrian government forces and allied militias, including Hezbollah, using heavy artillery. The strikes targeted observation points used by Iranian-backed forces for reconnaissance in the southern Syrian region.

After the fall of the Assad regime, Israeli forces invaded bordering Syrian territory and carried out extensive land clearing and road construction on and around Qers al-Nafl. These activities included creating military routes that connect northern Quneitra villages with the slopes of Mount Hermon near Beit Jinn, located in southwestern Rif Dimashq Governorate. The Israeli forces have also established military positions on the hill, including surveillance cameras and fortifications.
