= SMART News Agency =

Syrian independent news agency

SMART News Agency - وكالة سمارت للأنباء
- Website type: News
- Available in: Arabic, English (occasionally)
- Owner: Chamsy Sarkis
- Editor: Muhammad Malaak
- Website: t.me/SMARTNews_Agency smartnewsagency.com
- Launched: August 2013; 13 years ago
- Current status: open

The SMART News Agency (Arabic: وكالة سمارت للأنباء) is an independent online Arabic-language media agency that mainly operates in Syria. It was owned by the Syrian Media Action Revolution Team (SMART), the largest independent opposition media network operating in Syria. Launched in August 2013, the agency releases daily news content, including photographs, videos, and text. As of October 2015, the agency has 300 staff members.

== History ==
Syrian activists based in France established the Syrian Media Action Revolution Team (SMART) in April 2011. One of its co-founders was Chamsy Sarkis, who would later become the founder and CEO of SMART News Agency. SMART cooperates with other media organizations such as the Association for the Support of Free Media and Enab Baladi. Part of their work included smuggling modems into Syria to broadcast content.

In 2014, the European Endowment for Democracy, based in Brussels, Belgium, gave SMART a €129,000 grant.

In September 2015, SMART News Agency and Okio Report released an interactive virtual reality video on the aftermath of the Battle of Jisr al-Shughur. On 26 September, Obada Ghazal, the SMART journalist who filmed the video, was killed by an airstrike in Taftanaz. Two days later, SMART's office in Deir ez-Zor was raided by the Islamic State of Iraq and the Levant and two SMART staff members were abducted.

In June 2016, SMART News Agency released another VR video, this time on the White Helmets in Aleppo.

== See also ==
- Orient News
- Hawar News Agency
- ARA News
- Syria Direct
