= Alonei HaBashan =

Israeli settlement in the Golan Heights

Alonei HaBashan: אַלּוֹנֵי הַבָּשָׁן (Hebrew)

Hebrew transcription(s)
  - Official: Allone HaBashan
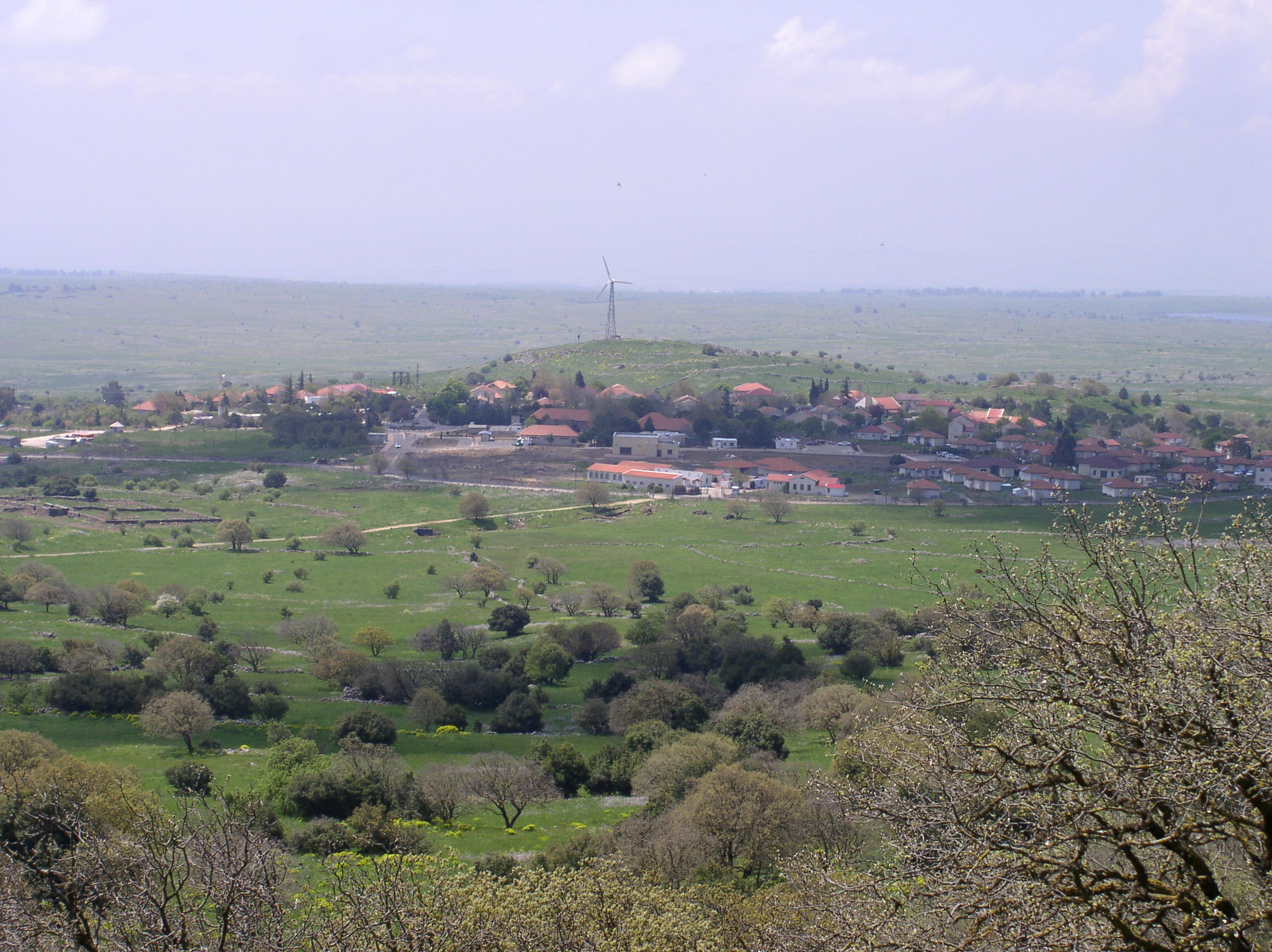

- Location within the Golan Heights Location within the Golan Heights
- Coordinates: 33°2′35″N 35°50′16″E
- Country: Golan Heights (Internationally recognized as Syrian territory occupied by Israel.)
- District: Northern
- Subdistrict: Golan
- Council: Golan
- Region: Golan Heights
- Founded: 1981
- Population (2024): 512

Alonei HaBashan (Hebrew: אַלּוֹנֵי הַבָּשָׁן) is an Israeli settlement located in the eastern Golan Heights, organized as a moshav shitufi, under the administration of Israel, which considers it part of its sovereign territory. The settlement was established after Israel occupied the area in the Six Day War in 1967. It falls under the municipal jurisdiction of the Golan Regional Council, and is the easternmost locality within Israeli-controlled territory. In 2024 it had a population of 512. It is part of the Hapoel HaMizrachi movement.

The international community considers Israeli settlements in the Golan Heights illegal under international law, but the Israeli government disputes this.

== Etymology ==
The name, literally "Oaks of Bashan", is taken from the Bible (Isaiah 2:13). "Bashan" is a Biblical name for the Golan Heights.

== History ==
The settler nucleus was established on the basis of a group of singles and one family who received settlement training at Ramat Magshimim. The nucleus ascended to the site on Lag BaOmer, May 1981 and the moshav was established. The nucleus of the founders included Bnei Akiva graduates who wanted to emphasize the importance of settlement in all parts of Israel and especially in the sparsely populated center of the Golan.

Many times the moshav was encountered with water shortage.

In November 2012, three mortars fired from Syrian-controlled territory landed near Alonei Bashan. Two exploded in open areas and one fell outside a house but did not explode. In February 2013, a Syrian tank shell landed in the village. Sappers who dismantled it believe it may have been a stray round fired in the course of the Syrian Civil War.

== Geography ==
The settlement is located on the edge of the Bashanit ridge, and as the easternmost settlement in Israeli-occupied territory, it is located about 700 meters from the ceasefire line between Israel and Syria. The settlement is located at an altitude of 980 meters above sea level, near Mount Hosek (which is 1158 meters high). The settlement is adjacent to a large nature reserve called "Forest Bashanit" – the second largest natural forest in the Golan.

The height of the settlement above sea level affects the weather in the place. In the summer the weather is cool and pleasant during the day, and at night it is sometimes not enough with light clothing. In winter the weather is cold. The whole area is often covered with thick fog, strong winds blow and every year the settlement is covered with significant snow.

== Economy ==
The economy of the moshav is based on agriculture. This includes cherry, apple, and vine groves for wine production. It has also a dairy farm.

There are also tourist attractions: a horse riding farm and a company that operates segway tours called "Kaal Daat - Segway trips".

The moshav also has a unique high school yeshiva that provides individual education and contains children with learning disabilities, or those who prefer personal treatment and a family atmosphere. Each class has a limited number of students, who are given the opportunity to specialize in photography, film and cruising, as well as to take part in an equestrian center used for tourism and therapeutic riding and located at the entrance to the moshav.

== See also ==
- Israeli-occupied territories
