= Tiyas Air Base =

Syrian Arab Air Force base in Homs Governorate, Syria

Tiyas Air Base قاعدة التياس الجوية العسكرية
- IATA: none; ICAO: OS72

Summary
- Airport type: Air base
- Owner: (Syria) Syrian Armed Forces
- Operator: Syrian Air Force
- Location: Tiyas, Homs Governorate
- In use: Unknown-present
- Coordinates: 34°31′21″N 37°37′47″E

Map
- Location in Syria

Runways
Direction	Length		Surface
Direction	ft	m	Surface
00/00	10,520	3,200	Concrete

The Tiyas Air Base, also known as the T-4 Air base, is a Syrian Air Force base located in the Homs Governorate, north of Tiyas, and west of the ancient city of Palmyra, Syria.

Tiyas is the largest airbase in Syria.

== History ==
During the 1970s and 1980s, the Soviet Union was given access to the Tiyas Air Base for the periodic deployment of naval aircraft.

=== Civil War ===
The airbase was used by the Syrian Arab Air Force and Iran's Quds Force for military operations against ISIL and opposition forces during the Syrian Civil War.

In December 2016, the Islamic State of Iraq and the Levant (ISIL) attacked the airbase a day after overrunning pro-government forces in nearby Palmyra. ISIL claimed to have destroyed four Syrian military aircraft during their attack on the airbase.

The Israeli Air Force launched an attack on the airbase on 10 February 2018, destroying the main observation tower, according to the Syrian Observatory for Human Rights.

The base was struck again on 9 April 2018 by multiple missiles. It was not immediately clear who was behind the attack; however, U.S officials denied launching any air attack on Syria. It was reported that this attack on the base, reportedly another strike conducted by the Israeli Air Force, destroyed a hangar used to shelter drones and an Iranian supplied anti-aircraft Tor missile system, before it could be set up and become fully operational.

T-4 air base was used by Iran-backed Shia militias to launch drone strikes against U.S. bases in northern Syria during summer 2021.

Israeli warplanes attacked the airbase with missiles again on 8 October 2021 around 9:30 pm. Six Syrian soldiers were injured, according to Syrian media. Israel claimed that the airbase was still used by Iranian forces.

The airbase was captured by members of the Syrian Free Army in early December 2024.

Turkey began efforts to take control of the air base and was preparing to deploy Hisar or SIPER air defence systems there, sources familiar with the matter told Middle East Eye. The bases were later bombed by the Israeli Air Force.

== Aircraft ==
- 1 Squadron MiG-25PDS/PU/RB
- 5 Squadron MiG-25PDS/PU/RB
- 819 Squadron Su-24MK2
- 827 Squadron Su-22M4

== See also ==
- List of Syrian Air Force bases
