= Jabah =

Jabah جبا
- Town
- Location in Syria
- Coordinates: 33°9′42″N 35°55′32″E
- Grid position: 236/287 PAL
- Country: Syria
- Governorate: Quneitra
- District: Quneitra District
- Subdistrict: Khan Arnabah

Population (2004)
  - Total: 5,281
- Time zone: UTC+2 (EET)
  - Summer (DST): UTC+3 (EEST)
- City Qrya Pcode: C6277

Jabah (Arabic: جبا) is a Syrian village located in Quneitra District, Quneitra. According to the Syria Central Bureau of Statistics (CBS), Jabah had a population of 5,281 in the 2004 census.

== History ==
In 1596, Jabah appeared in the Ottoman tax registers under the name of Jaba, situated in the nahiya (subdistrict) of Jaydur in the Hauran Sanjak. It had an entirely Muslim population of 30 households and 23 bachelors. They paid a fixed tax-rate of 40% on agricultural products, including wheat, barley, summer crops, fruit trees, goats and bee-hives; in addition to occasional revenues. Their total tax was 8,500 akçe, with all of it going to a waqf (religious trust).

== Archaeology ==
An archaeological survey conducted in the 1970s reported that a local mosque, constructed during the Ottoman period, contained three ancient basalt window grilles featuring the "Knot of Hercules" and grapevine decorations. A similar decorated grille was found repurposed in a local home. These grilles are believed to have originated in the Roman period.

== Bibliography ==
- Hütteroth, W.-D.; Abdulfattah, K. (1977). Historical Geography of Palestine, Transjordan and Southern Syria in the Late 16th Century. Erlanger Geographische Arbeiten, Sonderband 5. Erlangen, Germany: Vorstand der Fränkischen Geographischen Gesellschaft. ISBN 3-920405-41-2.
