= Al-Kawm, Quneitra =

Town in Quneitra, Syria

Al-Kawm الكوم
- Town
- Location within Syria
- Coordinates: 33.2069732°N 35.9599444°E
- Country: Syria
- Governorate: Quneitra Governorate
- District: Quneitra District
- Subdistrict: Khan Arnaba Subdistrict

Population (2008)
  - Total: 5,000

Al-Kawm (Arabic: الكوم), also known as Kom Elwisseh (Arabic: كوم الويسية), is a town in southern Syria, located in the eastern part of the Quneitra Governorate. It is considered to be a gateway to Quneitra and a transportation hub connecting to Daraa and As-Suwayda.

== Geography and divisions ==
Al-Kawm consists of three sections: Eastern Al-Kawm, Middle Al-Kawm, and Western Al-Kawm. It is bordered by Ma‘as and Al-Shawaktliyah to the east, Ayoubah and Jibbah to the south, Al-‘Atm and Ain Khurma to the north, and Koum Al-Wisiyah and Al-Sandianah to the west. The town is located along the Quneitra-Damascus highway, making it a key transportation link.

== Economy and agriculture ==
Al-Kawm's economy primarily relies on agriculture due to the availability of water from rivers and springs. The town's farmers cultivate a variety of crops, including apples, cherries, olives, grains, and vegetables like cabbage, tomatoes, cucumbers, and zucchini. The introduction of an irrigation network by the Quneitra Water Resources Directorate has improved agricultural output.

The town also has a growing animal husbandry sector, with residents raising dairy cattle and beekeeping. Local authorities provide support through subsidized loans and land reclamation programs to encourage small-scale agricultural and animal husbandry projects.

== Education and infrastructure ==
Al-Kawm has seven schools offering basic and secondary education.

Since the establishment of its municipality in 1996, the town has seen significant infrastructure improvements, including paved roads, street lighting, drinking water networks, and a main sewage system completed in 2008. The town also hosts a health clinic and several farmers' cooperatives.

== Population ==
The population of Al-Kawm, estimated at over 5,000 in 2008, comprises a mix of native residents and families displaced from the Israeli-occupied Golan Heights.
