= Tiyas =

Tiyas التياس الصفا
- Village
- Al-Safa
- Location in Syria
- Coordinates: 34°33′4″N 37°41′55″E
- Country: Syria
- Governorate: Homs
- District: Homs
- Subdistrict: Al-Qaryatayn
- Elevation: 550 m (1,800 ft)

Population (2004)
  - Total: 2,564
- Time zone: UTC+2 (EET)
  - Summer (DST): +3

Tiyas (Arabic: التياس, also known as al-Safa Arabic: الصفا) is a village in central Syria, administratively part of the Homs Governorate, east of Homs. It is situated in the Syrian Desert, and the closest localities are Tadmur (Palmyra) to the east, the subdistrict center of al-Qaryatayn to the southwest, Furqlus to the west and Uqayribat to the northwest. According to the Central Bureau of Statistics (CBS), Tiyas had a population of 2,564 in the 2004 census.

Tiyas is also near the Syrian Air Force base of the same name which lies just to the southwest. During the 1970s and 1980s, the Soviet Union was given access to the Tiyas Military Airbase for the periodical deployment of naval aircraft. The base at Tiyas was also used to patrol the United States' naval fleet in the Eastern Mediterranean Sea.

== Bibliography ==
- Tatum, Dale C. (2002). Who Influenced Whom?: Lessons from the Cold War. University Press of America. ISBN 0761824448.
- Polmar, Norman (1991). The Naval Institute Guide to the Soviet Navy. Naval Institute Press. ISBN 0870212419.
