= Khalkhalah =

Village in Syria

Khalkhalah خلخلة
- Village
- Location in Syria
- Coordinates: 33°4′1″N 36°31′55″E
- PAL: 293/275
- Country: Syria
- Governorate: Suwayda
- District: Shahba
- Subdistrict: Sawra as-Saghira

Population (2004)
  - Total: 2,268
- City Qrya Pcode: C6253

Khalkhalah (Arabic: خلخلة) is a village in southern Syria, administratively part of the Shahba District of Suwayda Governorate. According to the Syria Central Bureau of Statistics (CBS), Khalkhalah had a population of 2,268 in the 2004 census. Its inhabitants are predominantly Druze.

== History ==
In 1596, it appeared in Ottoman tax registers under the name of Halala, located in the nahiya of Bani Miglad in the Qada Hawran. It had a Muslim population consisting of 6 households. The villagers paid a fixed tax rate of 40% on various agricultural products, including wheat (4200 a.), barley (500 a.), summer crops (400 a.), goats and/or beehives (140 a.), in addition to "occasional revenues"(150 a.); a total of 5,340 akçe.

In 1838, it was noted as a ruin, situated "in the Luhf, east of the Lejah, i.e. in Wady el-Liwa".

== Religious buildings ==
- Maqam al-Khidr (Druze Shrine)

== See also ==
- Druze in Syria

== Bibliography ==
- Hütteroth, W.-D.; Abdulfattah, K. (1977). Historical Geography of Palestine, Transjordan and Southern Syria in the Late 16th Century. Erlanger Geographische Arbeiten, Sonderband 5. Erlangen, Germany: Vorstand der Fränkischen Geographischen Gesellschaft. ISBN 3-920405-41-2.
- Robinson, E.; Smith, E. (1841). Biblical Researches in Palestine, Mount Sinai and Arabia Petraea: A Journal of Travels in the year 1838. Vol. 3. Boston: Crocker & Brewster.
