= List of aviation shootdowns and accidents during the Syrian civil war =

During the course of the Syrian Civil War, aviation shootdowns, incidents, and accidents have taken place between different state and non-state actors. By mid-2013, according to website Strategy Page, the Syrian Arab Republic Air Force losses totaled nearly a hundred fixed-wing aircraft, as well as one hundred helicopters. Some 400 aircrew have also been killed, captured, or declared missing.

During the conflict, public observation via Google Earth of Syrian airfields shows a decreasing number of aircraft parked in the open in contrast to the increasing number of recorded air sorties. The hubs of Syrian Air Force basing activity prior to and during the Syrian Civil War have been the airfields in the cities of Aleppo, Damascus, Latakia and Hama.

Prior to the takeover of Syria by rebel factions in late 2024, Iran and Russia supported the combat readiness of the Syrian Arab Air Force increasingly over the years, with resources being consolidated towards useful assets and wider availability of service and parts for remaining air-frames.

The list below includes both crewed and uncrewed aircraft.

== Introduction ==
Involved air forces

Syrian Arab Republic Air Force Roundel - defunct

Syrian Arab Republic Armed Forces Flag - defunct

Iranian Air Force Roundel

Russian Air Force Roundel
Syrian Arab Airforce Roundel

USAF Roundel

Israeli Air Force Roundel

Turkish Air Force Roundel

Jordanian Air Force Roundel

Syrian Air Force strength during the Syrian Civil War (as of September 2014)
Year	Air Force personnel	Combat aircraft	Attack helicopters
2011	100,000	555	36
2014	63,000	295	25

== 2012 ==
- 20 June 2012 – A SyAAF Mil Mi-8 helicopter was shot down over Idlib.
- 22 June 2012 – A Turkish RF-4E Phantom reconnaissance aircraft was shot down by the Syrian Arab Air Defense over the sea near the Turkish-Syrian border while on a mission. Both pilots were killed. Turkey claimed the reconnaissance aircraft was in international airspace when it was shot down, while Syrian authorities stated it was within Syrian airspace.
- 13 August 2012 –A Syrian MiG-23 was video recorded catching fire in flight. Automatic gunfire was heard in the background while the fighter aircraft was flying level, and at low altitude. The pilot ejected, was captured by rebels, and later interrogated on video.
- 25 August 2012 – A Syrian L-39 Albatros jet crashed after a ground attack mission on Idlib.
- 27 August 2012 – An Mi-8 or Mi-17 helicopter was shot down over Damascus, possibly by a ZU-23-2 antiaircraft gun.
- 30 August 2012 – A MiG-21, tail number 2271, was downed by heavy machine gun fire, likely on takeoff or landing at Abu Dhuhur air base. The airfield was under siege by rebels.
- 4 September 2012 – Another MiG-21, tail number 2280, was video recorded being shot down. It was likely downed on takeoff or landing at Abu Dhuhur air base, which was under siege by rebels, by KPV 14.5mm machine gun fire.
- 5 October 2012 – Syrian rebels shot down a Syrian Army Mi-8 helicopter.
- 13 October 2012 – An L-39ZA Albatros crashed, possibly shot down by 23mm anti-aircraft fire, near Khan al-Asal. The crew, Lt. Col. Haitham Ismail Zhuneida and Lt. Mohammed Salman Mohammed, were killed as they ejected at low altitude.
- 15 October 2012 – A L-39 Albatros was downed near al-Taana by rebel ground fire east of Aleppo. Both pilots, Capt. Roni Ibrahim and Maj. Moti Shaaban Abbas, ejected and were captured. An Al Jazeera reporter, which reported the aircraft as a "MiG", managed to interview Ibrahim, while Abbas is said to have died in captivity. Ibrahim showed signs of having brawled with his captors and denied previous knowledge of Syrian civilians being targeted by airstrikes.
- 17 October 2012 – An Mi-8 helicopter was shot down over Damascus, exploding in midair.
- 5 November 2012 – A SyAAF Mi-17, tail number 2968, was shot down by AA fire from Al-Farouq Battalion, and proceeded to crash inside Tadmor Airbase. The fate of the crew is unknown, although some unconfirmed reports stated 11 personnel were killed in this incident.
- 28 November 2012 – A video showing the crash site of an Su-24MK2 fighter was posted, with rebels claiming they shot it down with an 9K310 Igla-1 MANPADS.
- 5 December 2012 – A SyAAF Mil Mi-8 attack helicopter was shot down by Syrian rebels over Anjara.
- 5 December 2012 – A SyAAF Mil Mi-8 helicopter crew was captured by Syrian rebels after it was shot down in the city of Abu Kamal.

== 2013 ==
- 5 January 2013 – A SyAAF Mil Mi-8 was downed near Taftanaz air base in Idlib.
- 11 January 2013 – Free Syrian Army units invaded Taftanaz air base, seizing at least 5 helicopters. Some of the helicopters were operational, and others were not.
- 3 February 2013 – SyAAF Mil Mi-8 was downed in the Mansoura area near Al Tabaqa town in Raqqa province.
- 5 February 2013 – A SyAAF MiG-23 was destroyed on the ground during an Al-Nusra Front attack on the Abu al-Duhur Military Airbase in Idlib.
- 14 February 2013 – A Sukhoi Su-22 was shot down by rebel forces using a MANPADS.
- 25 February 2013 – A SyAAF Mil Mi-8 helicopter was shot down by rebels near Menagh Air Base, close to the border with Turkey, using an FN-6 MANPADS.
- 4 March 2013 – Rebels shot down an Mil Mi-17 helicopter near Menagh airbase, south of Aleppo.
- 12 April 2013 – A SyAAF Mil Mi-17 was shot down whilst ferrying food and supplies to trapped soldiers in Wadi.
- 12 June 2013 – Liwa al Islam shot down and recovered an Ababil-3 drone in Damascus.
- 25 June 2013 – A SyAAF Su-22M-3 was shot down by rebels near Tabqa airbase.
- 18 July 2013 – Syrian rebels shot down a Syrian Arab Army helicopter, causing it to explode on impact.
- 18 August 2013 – A Syrian MiG jet fighter (probably a MiG-23) was shot down by rebel fighters (allegedly by a 9K38 Igla). The pilot ejected from the aircraft in Latakia.
- 10 September 2013 – A SyAAF MiG-21 was video recorded while on fire and crashing in Idlib. The jet was allegedly brought down by FSA (Free Syrian Army) rebel fire.
- 16 September 2013 – A Mil Mi-17 helicopter was shot down by a Turkish Air Force F-16 in Latakia province, near the Turkish border. The helicopter fell 1 km within Syrian territory.
- 4 October 2013 – One Mil Mi-17 helicopter was lost when it accidentally struck the tail of a Syrian passenger plane. The airliner landed safely at Damascus airport, and the Syrian information ministry said no passengers were harmed.
- 7 December 2013 – A Syrian Yasir UAV crashed in the Qalamoun mountains.
- 19 December 2013 – A Syrian Ababil-3 was lost over the town of Al-Ghantu, a town north of the city of Homs.

== 2014 ==
- 16 January 2014 – Syrian rebels claimed to have shot down a Syrian Mi-8 or Mi-17 helicopter with a 9K33 Osa SAM system.
- 23 March 2014 – A SyAAF MiG-23 was shot down by a Turkish Air Force F-16, when it allegedly entered Turkish air space during a ground attack mission against Al Qaeda-linked insurgents. The pilot ejected and managed to return to a Syrian Army checkpoint, but denies violating Turkish air space. The plane crashed one kilometer inside Syrian territory.
- 9 April 2014 – A Syrian Yasir UAV was shot down over the Qalamoun area.
- 21 May 2014 – An Ababil-3, serial number R-1003, crashed due to a technical failure over the town of Mleha in the Damascus countryside.
- 23 June 2014 – A SyAAF MiG-23BN was shot Down by the FSA's Al Muthanna Bin Haretha battalion in the eastern Qalamoun area north of Damascus.
- 30 June 2014 – SyAAF pilot Brig. Gen. Bassam Ali Muhammad was shot down during an attack against ground targets in the Hama governorate while flying a MiG-21. Neither side confirmed whether it was brought down by an AA gun or a MANPADS. The aircraft crashed 10 km to the east of Hama air base, as reported by rebel observers.
- 18 August 2014 – A SyAAF MiG-23MF, tail no. 617, crashed. Rebels claimed to have shot it down. The Syrian government acknowledged the jet had crashed, but did not say it was shot down. The aircraft was based at Hama air base, and was piloted by Major Aref Amin Bsesini (b. 1984), who died in the crash.
- 12 September 2014 – Syrian militant Sham Legion brigade destroyed a Syrian Mi-17 with a 9M133 Kornet, after the helicopter landed at a military airbase in Idlib Governorate.
- 16 September 2014 – The Islamic State of Iraq and the Levant (ISIL) claimed it shot down a warplane (likely a MiG-21) conducting an airstrike in the city of Raqqa.
- 23 September 2014 – A SyAAF Su-24 was shot down by an Israeli Air Force MIM-104 Patriot missile system, when it allegedly crossed the Syrian-Israeli ceasefire line during a ground attack mission against Al Qaeda insurgents. It is likely that the crew ejected successfully.
- (2) 21 October 2014 – Syrian minister of information Omran al-Zoubi claimed Syrian air force fighters had shot down two jets flown by the ISIS as they attempted to land at Jirah Military Airbase. Media reports had claimed ISIS was flying three captured Syrian jets, variously identified as MiG-21s, MiG-23s or L-39s. A brief video posted by the group claimed to show one of the jets in flight.
- 21 October 2014 – Syrian rebels destroyed a SyAAF L-39ZA with a TOW missile as it sat on a runway at Aleppo airport.
- 10 November 2014 – A Syrian MiG-21bis, tail number 2204, operating from Hama AB and piloted by Col. Tha'er Aref Saqqour, was downed 45 km east of the airbase near the town of Sabboura.
- 12 November 2014 – A SyAAF MiG-23 fighter was hit by a Syrian rebel TOW missile at Aleppo airport.
- 30 November 2014 – A USAF F-16CJ crashed due to a mechanical failure shortly after takeoff for a night combat mission against the Islamic State. The pilot was killed.
- 21 December 2014 – Syrian sources claimed a Skylark UAV crashed in Quneitra during a reconnaissance mission. The IDF said it had no knowledge of a UAV in the area at the time, but photos of the drone released showed that it was indeed an Israeli Skylark UAV.
- 24 December 2014 – A Royal Jordanian Air Force F-16AM crashed near Raqqa, Syria. Its pilot, Flight Lieutenant Muath al-Kasasbeh, was captured by Islamic State militants. Initially reported as shot down by enemy fire, ISIL reported it downed the F-16 with a MANPADS while it was flying at low altitude. Later, the US CENTCOM rejected the claim, ruling out hostile fire as the cause of the crash, but stated no further details.

== 2015 ==
- 18 January 2015 – A Syrian Air Force Antonov An-26 transport plane crashed while attempting to land at the besieged Abu al-Duhur military airport, killing all 30 soldiers on board. The government blamed the crash on heavy fog, while Al-Nusra claimed they shot the aircraft down.
- 30 January 2015 – ISIS claimed it shot down a Syrian Arab Air Force fighter in the Bir Qassab area of Damascus.
- 17 February 2015 – A SyAAF helicopter was reportedly downed by the Al-Qaeda linked Nusra Front over a military base in the northwestern province of Idlib.
- 17 March 2015 – A US MQ-1 Predator combat drone was shot down by a Syrian Air Defense Force S-125 surface-to-air missile while on an intelligence flight near the coastal town of Latakia.
- 22 March 2015 – A Syrian Navy Mil Mi-14 helicopter crashed or was shot down over opposition-held rural Idlib. At least one crew member was summarily executed by rebels, four were taken captive, and one remains unaccounted for.
- 20 April 2015 – A SyAAF L-39 operating from Kuweires air base crashed near the Military Housing due to a technical failure. The copilot Captain Ali Zaher died, while the pilot ejected safely and returned to base.
- 24 April 2015 – ISIS downed a Syrian MiG-23 ML flying east of Khalkhalah air base in Sweida governorate. Pro-ISIS Twitter accounts claimed jihadist groups had captured the pilot, but later evidence suggested the pilot, Hassan Mohamed Mahmoud, shot himself to avoid capture. Syrian television reported the aircraft crashed due to "technical problems" on a training exercise and that the search for the pilot was ongoing.
- May 2015 – A Su-24M2 was heavily damaged by anti-aircraft fire and crashed while returning to base. Both the pilot and navigator ejected safely.
- 16 May 2015 – Two Turkish Air Force F-16s shot down a Syrian Mohajer-4 UAV, firing two AIM-9 missiles after it had lingered within Turkish airspace for 5 minutes. Witnesses on the ground reported seeing the target breaking into three pieces after being hit, before it crashed on the Syrian side of the border. Turkey initially claimed it was a helicopter, but later confirmed it was a UAV.
- (2) 20 May 2015 – During the Tadmur offensive (2015), ISIL captured Tadmur airbase. Two Mi-17s were found destroyed on the runway, and analysts suspected many MiGs were stored in the base. However, most, if not all, are in derelict status.
- 24 May 2015 – A Syrian military Mi-17 helicopter crashed near Kuweires air base in Aleppo, which ISIL had besieged for over a year. All three crew members died, and while the Syrian government claimed that it crashed due to technical failure, ISIL sources claimed it was shot down.
- (2) 28 May 2015 – Two Su-24s were believed to have been destroyed on the ground while being rearmed, killing at least five, and wounding another dozen.
- 11 June 2015 – A SyAAF Su-24 exploded in midair and crashed in the eastern countryside of Dara'a near the village of Nahta. While the Southern Front of the Free Syrian Army brigade Yarmouk Army claimed they shot it down as it passed over the Brigade 52 base with 23mm AA fire, the damage suggests a midair weapon explosion as the cause of the crash.
- 13 June 2015 – At around 0025 hrs., a SyAAF Mil Mi-8/17 piloted by Lt. Col. Ahmad Saleh and Lt. Col. Muhammad Khaddour, was shot down by ISIS shortly after it took off from Kweres air base (Aviation Academy). Saleh, Khaddour, and 1Lt. Humam Ali were killed.
- 25 June 2015 – A SyAAF Mil Mi-25 operating from Blai air base reportedly crashed in the northern county of Homs Governorate near the village of Izz Eddin, killing the crew. Rebels claimed they shot down the helicopter, while government media stated it was a technical failure. The crew consisted of Brig. Gen. pilot Samir Al-Shekha, Capt. Rami Mustafa and 1Lt. Alaa' ِAhmad Al-Ali.
- 28 June 2015 – A SyAAF MiG-21bis, operating from Deir Ez-Zor airbase, crashed east of the airfield, killing the pilot, Brig. Gen. Suheil Omran. ISIS claimed that the aircraft was shot down by AA fire.
- 3 August 2015 – A SyAAF MiG-21bis, operating from Hama Air base, crashed into a marketplace in the north-western town of Ariha during a bombing run when the pilot could not pull up after bomb release. The pilot died in the crash and several others were killed on the ground.
- 26 August 2015 – A SyAAF L-39 piloted by Col. Mazen Ghanm crashed due to a technical failure south of Kweres airbase, killing the pilot.
- 15 September 2015 – A Syrian Mi-17 helicopter was shot down by a MANPADS shortly after takeoff. A first shot strayed away, while a second missile shot the aircraft down, killing the crew.
- 17 September 2015 – A SyAAF Sukhoi Su-22M4 crashed near the Jazal Oil Field area. Insurgents claimed they shot it down.
- 8 October 2015 – A SyAAF helicopter was downed near the village of Kafr Nabouda in northern Hama.
- 16 October 2015 – A Russian-made UAV (probably an Orlan-10) was downed by a Turkish F-16 near the border with Latakia, after it violated Turkish airspace.
- 4 November 2015 – A Syrian MiG-23, was downed by AA fire in northwest Hama, near the town of Kafr Nabuda, where fighting was raging between insurgents and government forces backed by air cover. The pilot was killed.
- 24 November 2015 – A Russian Sukhoi Su-24M was shot down by a Turkish Air Force F-16 near the Syria–Turkey border. Both sides disputed whether the aircraft was hit on the Turkish or Syrian side of the border. Both crew members ejected, but the pilot was killed by ground fire from Syrian Turkmen Brigade militants. The Weapon System Officer was rescued during a CSAR mission.
- 24 November 2015 – Two Russian Mi-8AMTSh helicopters were sent to find and recover the pilots from the crash site of the Su-24M downed before. One of the helicopters was damaged by small-arms fire from Syrian Turkmen Brigade militants, killing a naval infantryman copilot, and was forced to make an emergency landing. All the surviving crew of the helicopter were rescued and evacuated later on. The Free Syrian Army rebels claimed they subsequently destroyed the helicopter with a BGM-71 TOW missile.

== 2016 ==
- 12 March 2016 – A Syrian MiG-21 was shot down by Jaysh al-Nasr over Hama near Kafr Nabudah. The Syrian Observatory for Human Rights reported the warplane was downed by two heat-seeking missiles, while Jaysh al-Nasr militants say they shot it down with anti-aircraft guns. Video evidence suggested it was downed by a MANPADS. The pilot ejected, but died, either killed by ground fire while descending or by other causes.
- 5 April 2016 – The al-Nusra Front reportedly downed an Su-22 jet, likely with a MANPADS, in Aleppo near al-Eiss village while it was on a reconnaissance mission. The pilot was captured by rebel forces. Some sources state the plane was actually downed by Ahrar Al-Sham, a coalition of Islamist and Salafist units, who handed the pilot to Al-Qaeda affiliated Al-Nusra.
- 12 April 2016 – A Russian Air Force Mil Mi-28N crashed near Homs, killing its crew of two.
- 22 April 2016 – A Syrian MiG-23ML of No. 67 squadron piloted by Capt. Azzam Eid and operating from Al-Dumayr Military Airport, tail number 2754, crashed east of Tal Dakwa mountains in the eastern countryside of Damascus. Syrian Armed Forces blamed engine failure for the crash, but the Islamic State of Iraq and the Levant claimed it was shot down with an anti aircraft weapon, though they claimed no responsibility. The pilot ejected and was likely captured by enemy forces.
- (4) 14 May 2016 – Four unidentified Russian helicopters were destroyed, and multiple planes damaged at Tiyas Military Airbase, when ISIS fired Grad missiles at the base. Russia denied these losses.
- 19 June 2016 – A Syrian MiG-21 crashed shortly after takeoff at Hama airbase due to a technical problem. The pilot and two people on the ground were killed.
- 27 June 2016 – A Syrian MiG-23BN crashed, killing its pilot.
- 1 July 2016 – A Syrian Su-22M3 crashed near Jairood town in the Qalamoun region, due to what the local insurgents themselves described as "technical failure". The pilot was captured by Jaish Al-Islam and later executed.
- 1 July 2016 – A Syrian Mi-25 was shot down by rebels in Jurud Al-Qalamoun, killing three of its crew members.
- 5 July 2016 – A Syrian Arab Air Force MiG-23 from As-Seen air base crashed in flames near Maydaa in Eastern Ghouta, supposedly killing its pilot Ali Shawkat Soleiman.
- 5 July 2016 – A US MQ-9 Reaper combat drone crashed in Syria close to Tabqa. The remains of the drone were destroyed in an airstrike to prevent it from falling into enemy hands.
- 8 July 2016 – A Syrian Arab Air Force Mi-25, piloted by Russian pilots Ryafagat Khabibulin and Yevgeny Dolgin was shot down in Homs Governorate, after completing an airstrike and expending its ammunition. It was piloted by Russian pilots because Syrian units were not available at the time.
- 14 July 2016 – A Syrian MiG-21 crashed in the Deir ez-Zor region, killing its pilot. It is unknown whether it crashed due to technical issues, or was shot down by Islamic State forces as they claimed, who incorrectly identified the aircraft as a MiG-23.
- 20 July 2016– A SyAAF Liza, operating from T4 air base, was shot down by AAA in eastern rural Hama Governorate, killing the pilots, Col. Salman Suleiman and 1Lt. Ghadir Eid.
- 28 July 2016 – Syrian sources reported a MiG-23ML flown by Maj. Mohammad Suleiman Ismail took off from Nasriyeh AB, and hit the ground in the Qalamoun mountain area.
- 1 August 2016 – A Russian Mi-8AMTSh was shot down by ground fire in Idlib Governorate while returning to Khmeimim Air Base. Three crew members and two officers from Russia's Reconciliation Center in Syria were killed on what was a humanitarian mission, according to Russia's Ministry of Defence.
- 2 September 2016 – Rebels destroyed a SyAAF Aérospatiale Gazelle with a BGM-71 TOW as it landed on an airstrip near Khattab in Northern Hama. Both pilots were killed. The incident was recorded on video.
- 4 September 2016 – A SyAAF L-39 crashed near Sadad town, around 50 km south of Homs city, killing the pilot. The cause is unknown.
- 18 September 2016 – ISIS fighters shot down a SyAAF MiG-21, which crashed in Al-Thardah mountain near Deir ez-Zor airbase, killing the pilot.
- 21 September 2016 – ISIS fighters claimed to have shot down a SyAAF plane. According to testimonies on social media, the aircraft was a MiG-23 fighter plane that crashed near the airbase of Al-Dumayr, 40 kilometers from the capital.
- 24 September 2016 – A US MQ-1 Predator combat drone crashed in Al-Shaddana, Syria.
- 3 November 2016 – A Russian Mi-35 made an emergency landing near Syria's Palmyra city, and was destroyed, possibly by an unguided recoilless weapon, after it touched down. The crew returned safely to Khmeimim Airbase.
- 14 November 2016 – A MiG-29KUB ran out of fuel and crashed en route back to the Admiral Kuznetsov following a mission over Syria. It was unable to land, due to another MiG having snapped one of the arrestor cables while landing. The pilot ejected and survived.
- 3 December 2016 – A SyAAF L-39 operating from Neyrab Airbase crashed near the citadel of Aleppo, most likely due to a technical failure. Both pilots were killed.
- 3 December 2016 – The aircraft carrier Admiral Kuznetsov's air wing suffered another loss when a Sukhoi Su-33 Flanker-D crashed into the sea after the plane snapped the arrestor cable. The pilot ejected and survived.
- 10 December 2016 – A Syrian Air Force MiG-23MLD crashed in Hayyan field in eastern rural Homs Governorate. The pilot ejected and was recovered by friendly forces. Government media claimed the plane crashed because of a technical failure, while ISIS claimed they shot it down.
- 19 December 2016 – A SyAAF Aérospatiale Gazelle was shot down by ISIS in the vicinity of T4 airbase. The Gazelle was piloted by Brig. Gen. Khedr Al-Hussain and Maj. Abbas Yunes, who were both killed.

== 2017 ==
- (2) 6 January 2017 – IS forces besieging Deir ez-Zor airbase used anti-tank missiles to destroy two SyAAF L-39ZAs in their shelters.
- 5 February 2017 – A SyAAF Su-22M3 operating from Neyrab AB crashed on its landing approach, killing the pilot, Lt. Col. Bassel Saleh.
- 4 March 2017 – A SyAAF MiG-21bis from No. 679 squadron, operating from Hama AB and piloted by Col. Mohammad Sawfan, was shot down by rebels and crashed in Turkish territory nearby the borders. Sawfan ejected but was arrested by Turkish soldiers and taken to a hospital in Antakya. He returned to service, and it later became known the mission was his first sortie after suspension years before. A recording of the last conversation between Sawfan and the ground controller clearly shows Sawfan confused by a malfunctioning compass and navigation system. Unable to find his way back to base, he strayed into the range of Ahrar Al-Sham rebel AAA.
- 20 March 2017 – An Israeli Skylark UAV crashed in Quneitra during a reconnaissance mission. The Israeli military later acknowledged the loss.
- (9) 7 April 2017 – A U.S. attack allegedly destroyed several aircraft on the ground at Shayrat Air Base. Reports from Russian sources said 9 planes (all MiG-23s) were destroyed.
- 16 April 2017 – 40 Grad rockets were fired by Jaysh al-Izza and Jaysh al-Nasr at Hama airbase. The airbase was temporarily put out of action, and Jaysh Al-Nasr claimed at least one MiG-21 was destroyed on the ground.
- 27 April 2017 – A Syrian UAV was shot down by an Israeli Air Force MIM-104 Patriot Air Defense system, which fired two missiles at the target.
- 27 May 2017 – A RQ-21A UAV was reported shot down over Tartus. A Russian arms expo claimed it was downed by a Russian Pantsir air defense system.
- 5 June 2017 – A SyAAF MiG-21, tail number 2797, operating from Dmeyr air base and piloted by Brig. General Kamil Ahmad Smita, was shot down by rebels. Smita was killed by ground fire after ejecting. The plane crashed in Tal Dakwa area (around 30 km to the south east of Dmeyr AB).
- 8 June 2017 – An Iranian IRGC Shahed 129 armed drone was shot down by Coalition Forces In Syria. U.S. Army Colonel Ryan Dillon, the spokesman for Combined Joint Task Force-Operation Inherent Resolve (CJTF-OIR), the top American task force leading the fight against ISIS in Iraq and Syria, announced the incident while talking to the press on June 8, 2017. The apparent attack had occurred earlier the same day, and U.S. F-15E Strike Eagle fighters had responded by shooting down the pilotless plane.
- 15 June 2017 – A Jordanian Selex ES Falco combat drone was shot down by a Syrian MiG-23MLD in the vicinity of the Syrian town of Daraa using a R-24R missile.
- 16 June 2017 – A second Jordanian Selex ES Falco combat drone was shot down by a Syrian MiG-23MLD in the vicinity of the Syrian town of Daraa using a R-24R missile.
- 18 June 2017 – a SyAAF Su-22 was shot down by a U.S. Navy F/A-18E Super Hornet (AJ302) after it dropped bombs near U.S.-led coalition-partnered SDF fighters over the village of Ja' Din, south of Tabqa. The pilot initially fired an AIM-9X Sidewinder, which failed to bring down the Syrian jet. The missile may have been lured away by decoy flares from the Su-22, but the Navy pilot said it was unclear why the missile failed, and did not report seeing any flares. He then fired an AIM-120 AMRAAM, which brought down the Syrian plane. The Syrian pilot ejected successfully.
- 20 June 2017 – A U.S. F-15E Strike Eagle intercepted and shot down an armed Iranian IRGC Shahed 129 combat drone near al-Tanf, southern Syria, after threatening U.S. ground forces. This was the second Iranian drone shot down by U.S.-led coalition forces over Syria thatf month.
- 21 June 2017 – A SyAAF Mi-8/17 Hip helicopter crashed after takeoff from the airport of Qamishli, as a result of a technical malfunction. Other sources reported it was damaged over Deir Ez-Zor by ISIS anti aircraft fire and the pilot managed to fly back to Qamishli and crash land. The crew survived.
- 2 July 2017 – ISIS forces destroyed a SyAAF Mi-17 with an anti-tank missile immediately after it landed in the area of Al Assad Hospital in the western part of Deir Ez-Zor city. The helicopter in question was said to be delivering food and medication from Qamishli with four persons on board, all of whom were reported killed.
- 15 August 2017 – A Syrian MiG 23BN piloted by Lt. Col. Ali Al Helw was shot down by Jaysh Usud al-Sharqiya near the border with Jordan, reportedly with a ZU-23-2 or 0.50 DSHK heavy machine gun. Ali Al Helw ejected, and was captured by rebel forces. He was returned to the Syrian government along with 30 soldiers on August 31.
- 16 September 2017 – A Syrian helicopter (likely an Mil Mi-24) was shot down by Islamic State militants in Deir Ez-Zor.
- 29 September 2017 – A U.S. Marine Corps Bell Boeing V-22 Osprey crashed in Syria, injuring two U.S. servicemen.
- 19 September 2017 – A Hezbollah intelligence drone was shot down as it tried infiltrating Israeli-occupied territory through the Golan ceasefire line by an Israeli Air Force MIM-104 Patriot Air Defense system.
- 6 October 2017 – A Russian Mil Mi-28N made an emergency landing in eastern Hama province, on the south side of Sheikh Helal, with no casualties. Ground fire was ruled out by Russian MoD as the reason for the incident.
- 10 October 2017 – A Russian Su-24 crashed during takeoff at Khmeimim Air Base, Latakia province, supposedly due to technical malfunction. Both crew members died in the crash.
- (4) 13 November 2017 – IS militants disguised as Russian soldiers infiltrated the Syrian Air Base at Deir Ez-Zor, and targeted the fleet of L-39 light attack jets. Subsequent satellite evidence showed that four out of ten SyAAF L-39 were destroyed on the ground.
- 22 November 2017 – A SyAAF L-39 crashed on its landing approach after receiving ground fire during attack sortie in Deir Ez-Zor. The two pilots, Maj. Ali Mustafa and Capt. Sulaiman Yunes, were killed.
- 1 December 2017 – A Syrian Arab Air Force Mi-24 was shot down by rebel ground fire near Beit Jinn. The crew of three died.
- 31 December 2017 – A Russian Air Force Mi-24 crashed due to hitting power lines in Hama province. 2 of the 3 crew died.
- 31 December 2017 – Russian news agency Kommersant reported at least seven Russian planes were destroyed or damaged by rebel shelling of Hmeymim Airbase. Two Russian soldiers died in the attack, and another 10 were wounded. At least four Su-24 bombers, two Su-35S fighters, an An-72 transport plane, and an ammunition depot, were destroyed by the shelling, Kommersant said on its website, citing two "military-diplomatic" sources. Russian MoD later denied information about the planes' destruction. Leaked photos showed the planes were only damaged and some of them were repaired a few days after the attack.

== 2018 ==
- 3 February 2018 – A Russian Su-25, on a patrol mission over Syria's province of Idlib, was shot down by rebel forces, presumably by an anti-aircraft gun. Responsibility was claimed by Tahrir al-Sham (the former Jabhat al-Nusra) and Jaysh al-Nasr, which is affiliated with the Free Syrian Army. The pilot Maj Roman Filipov ejected and landed near Tell Debes, but blew himself up with a grenade to avoid capture after a firefight.
- 10 February 2018 – An Iranian IRGC Saegheh combat drone, was shot down by an Israeli AH-64 Apache helicopter over the northern town of Beit Shean, the Israeli military said.
- 10 February 2018 – An Israeli Air Force F-16I was shot down and crashed in Israel when it was hit by a S-200 missile fired by the Syrian Air Defense. Both pilots ejected and landed, heavily wounded, in Israel. The F-16I was part of a bombing mission against Syrian and Iranian targets around Damascus following an airspace violation by an Iranian drone, which had been shot down earlier that day.
- 10 February 2018 – A Turkish Air Force T129 ATAK helicopter was shot down by YPG in Kırıkhan district of Hatay province, close to Afrin Canton, killing its two pilots.
- 12 February 2018 – A Turkish Air Force Bayraktar Tactical UAS unmanned aerial drone was shot down by Kurdish forces near Qude village in the Afrin region.
- 6 March 2018 – A Russian military transport airplane Antonov An-26 crashed while landing at Khmeimim Airbase. Six crew members as well as 33 passengers, all of them military personnel, were killed in the crash.
- 18 March 2018 – A Syrian Arab Air Force Su-24 was shot down by rebels in the eastern Qalamoun Mountains, crashing in friendly territory. The fate of the crew is unknown, although a video later emerged that showed at least one of the pilots ejecting successfully.
- 3 May 2018 – A Russian Su-30SM crashed into the Mediterranean sea after taking off from the Khmeimim air base. According to preliminary reports, it suffered a bird strike. Both pilots were killed in the crash.
- 7 May 2018 – A Russian Ka-52 helicopter crashed during a routine flight over eastern regions of Syria. Both pilots were killed.
- 19 June 2018 – An Israeli Skylark UAV crashed in Hader during a reconnaissance mission.
- 11 July 2018 – A Syrian Arab Armed Forces' UAV was shot down above the Sea of Galilee by a Patriot missile. The IDF claimed the UAV crossed 10 km "into Israeli territory" from Syria after flying over Jordan.
- 24 July 2018 – A Syrian Arab Air Force Su-22M4 jet that took off from the T4 Homs air base to partake in the campaign against the Islamic State, was shot down by the Israeli Air Force’s 138th Battalion's surface-to-air missiles. Multiple warnings in several languages were issued when it allegedly crossed the 1974 Syrian-Israeli ceasefire line by around 2 kilometers. The Syrian government denied that it violated any airspace, claiming the jet was shot down over Syrian territory. The pilot, Col. ‘Umran Mare (or Omran Muri), from Tartous, was killed. The jet crashed in the area controlled by Islamic State in the northwestern corridor of the Yarmouk Basin.
- 17 September 2018 – A Russian Ilyushin Il-20M reconnaissance plane with 15 personnel was inadvertently shot down by a S-200 missile that was fired by the Syrian Air Defense.

== 2019 ==
- 29 June 2019 – A Russian Orlan-10 was shot down by Rouse the Believers Operations Room Jihadists, using AA over Sahl el Ghab, in the western Hama countryside.
- 14 August 2019 – Syrian insurgent group Tahrir al-Sham shot down a Sukhoi Su-22 Syrian fighter jet over the southern countryside of the Idlib Governorate. Reportedly, it was hit by heavy machine gun fire.
- 28 August 2019 – A Russian made Orlan-10 UAV crashed or was shot down near Jabal Shashabo by rebel forces.
- 31 August 2019 – Militants from Fatah al Mubin Operations Room claimed the destruction of a Russian drone. However, subsequent footage revealed the drone to be an Ababil-3.
- 19 September 2019 – Syrian Arab Air Defense Forces reported the downing of an enemy drone in the town of Aqraba. Other sources hinted the possibility of an Israeli-operated drone being shot down by Russian aircraft over Syria.
- 29 September 2019 – A Russian made Orlan-10 UAV was downed by a Turkish F-16, after it had allegedly violated the Turkish airspace six times, near the border town of Kilis.
- 18 October 2019 – A Turkish Army UH-60 Black Hawk helicopter crashed during an operation in the northern region of Syria. According to the Turkish Defense Ministry, the Turkish chopper crashed near the border city of Ras al-Ayn in Syria's Al-Hasakah Governorate.

== 2020 ==
- 11 February 2020 – A Syrian Mi-17 helicopter was shot down over Al-Nayrab, reportedly by a MANPADS.
- 14 February 2020 – A Syrian Mi-17 helicopter was shot down in the Aleppo Governorate, near the town of Qubtan al-Jabal by Syrian rebels, again using a MANPADS. All soldiers on board were killed.
- 25 February 2020 – A Turkish Army combat drone was downed by the Syrian Armed Forces in Dadekh, Idlib Governorate. The Syrian Arab News Agency reported the aircraft infiltrated in Syrian Airspace and was intercepted. Released footage showed that the downed drone was a TAI Anka.
- 1 March 2020 – A Turkish Army TAI Anka-S combat drone was downed by the Syrian Arab Army near Saraqib, Idlib. Syrian Arab Army have downed six drones in total in 24 hours.
- (2) 1 March 2020 – Two Syrian Su-24 strike bombers were shot down by Turkish Air Force F-16s using air-to-air missiles over the Syria–Turkey border. All four pilots safely ejected. Both Syrian and Turkish forces confirmed the downing.
- 2 March 2020 – A Turkish drone was shot down by Syrian Air Defense near Saraqib. On March 18, ANNA News reported the wreck of a Turkish Bayraktar TB2 combat drone shot down in Saraqib.
- 3 March 2020 – A Turkish Bayraktar TB2 drone was shot down by the Syrian Arab Army in Kifer Dael in the western countryside of Aleppo.
- 3 March 2020 – A Syrian Air Force L-39 combat trainer was shot down by a Turkish Air Force F-16 over Idlib province. The two pilots ejected into territory controlled by Turkish-backed forces, one was killed and then had his body mutilated. The other pilot was rescued by the Syrian Army 9th Storming Division, which went two kilometers behind enemy lines to retrieve him.
- 4 March 2020 – A Turkish Bayraktar TB2 combat drone was shot down by Syrian Arab Army air defenses in the evening in the Idlib Governorate. Footage during the same day was released of a Syrian Buk-M2E firing a missile at a drone near the city of Saraqib. The Syrian Army announced that this was the 10th Turkish drone to be shot down over the last 3 days, which has led to the Turkish military using them more cautiously.
- 5 March 2020 – A Syrian Air Force MiG-29 crashed in an accident at Shayrat Airbase shortly after takeoff. The pilot, Col. Yunes Al-Makdid, died in the crash.
- 10 March 2020 – A Russian Orlan-10 crashed near Suluk in Raqqa governorate.
- 26 April 2020 – A Syrian MiG-21 training aircraft crashed near the Hama Military Airport.
- 17 August 2020 – A Turkish drone is shot down by Russian forces stationed near a radio tower in Ain Al-Arab (Kobani).
- (2) 18 August 2020 – Two US MQ-9 Reapers combat drones were lost over Idlib, Syria. According to US officials, both drones collided and crashed. However, video images show one of the drones already on fire before crashing, and an explosion in the air implies that at least one of the drones was shot down by Turkish-backed rebels or Turkish forces.
- 23 August 2020 – A Turkish Bayraktar TB2 combat drone was shot down by Syrian Air Defenses near Kafr Nabl, Idlib after being detected spotting targets for Syrian rebels.
- 9 September 2020 – A Syrian Air Force MiG-23 crashed in an accident at Syrian military airbase in the province of Deir ez-Zor during takeoff, possibly due to a bird strike. The pilot managed to leave the aircraft unharmed.

== 2021 ==
- 18 January 2021 – A US Army UH-60 Black Hawk made a hard landing in Northern Syria as part of Operation Inherent Resolve. The helicopter was heavily damaged and later airlifted out of the region.
- 6 February 2021 – SDF forces mistakenly shot down a Russian Orlan-10 drone over Ayn Issa, believing it to be Turkish.
- 20 June 2021 – An Orlan-10 Russian reconnaissance aircraft crashed in the Jabal al-Arbaeen neighborhood in southern Idlib, due to technical failure.
- 2 August 2021 – A Forpost drone operated by Russia was accidentally shot down by Syrian forces near Kafr Halab.
- 15 August 2021 – An Israeli Skylark UAV crashed in Syria. The Israeli military acknowledged the loss, attributing it to mechanical failure.
- 21 August 2021 – An Iranian drone was reported shot down by a USAF F-15E, piloted by Brigadier General Christopher Sage, commander of the 332nd Air Expeditionary Wing, with an AIM-9X Sidewinder missile as it approached US and allied forces in Eastern Syria.
- 22 September 2021 – Syrian Air Defenses announced they shot down an enemy drone in southern Syria, likely an IAI Heron. Israeli officials acknowledged the loss of a drone over Syria, but claimed the cause to be technical failure.
- 23 October 2021 – A Syrian Mi-24 crashed in Homs desert as a result of a mechanical failure; the pilot was killed when he attempted to land the helicopter.
- 14 December 2021 – A Royal Air Force Eurofighter Typhoon shot down a drone of unknown origin. Two Typhoon FGR4s were on a routine patrol from their base in Cyprus when they were asked to investigate the small drone. The pilots identified it, and destroyed it using an ASRAAM missile. The incident took place near the Al Tanf coalition military base, close to the border with Iraq.

== 2022 ==
- 2 February 2022 – A US Army MH-60 Black Hawk helicopter was lost during a U.S. Joint Special Operations Command raid in Atme, Idlib Governorate to kill Abu Ibrahim al-Hashimi al-Qurashi, the leader of the Islamic State.
- 16 February 2022 – A Syrian Arab Air Force Mi-14 helicopter crash-landed in a mountainous area of the southeastern countryside of the Latakia Governorate near the town of Alruyemih due to technical problems. Two crew members died and another three were wounded. The helicopter was destroyed in the crash.
- 2 September 2022 – A Syrian Arab Air Force MiG-21 crashed in Al-Suwaida.
- 2 September 2022 – A Syrian Arab Air Force Mil Mi-8 crashed in Hama, killing all three crew members.
- 29 December 2022 – A Syrian Arab Air Force L-39 trainer aircraft crashed near Kuweires Airbase in eastern Aleppo. The pilot was killed in the crash.

== 2023 ==
- 11 June 2023 – A US Army CH-47 Chinook crashed in Syria, leaving 22 US servicemen with wounds of varying degrees.
- 5 October 2023 – During an incident involving the United States and Turkey, a Turkish TAI Anka-S combat drone was shot down by a US Air Force F-16 Fighting Falcon over the skies of the city of Al-Hasaka.

== 2024 ==
- 1 March 2024 – A US Marine Corps RQ-21 Blackjack drone crashed near Raqqa.
- 27 June 2024 – A US Army MQ-1C Gray Eagle drone crashed in Syria.
- 29 November 2024 – A Syrian Arab Army Mi-8 was destroyed in the ground by a FPV drone operated by rebels.
- 3 December 2024 – A L-39ZA Albatros of the Syrian Air Force was destroyed in the ground by Hayat Tahrir al-Sham insurgents at Kuweires Military Aviation Institute, Aleppo.
- (11) 8 December 2024 – Eleven Aérospatiale Gazelle 342 helicopters of the Syrian Air Force were destroyed in the ground at Mezzeh Air Base by Israeli airstrikes.
- (2) 9 December 2024 – Two Syrian Arab Air Force MiG-23ML were destroyed by Israeli airstrikes in Khelkhleh Air Base.
- 9 December 2024 – A US Army MQ-9A Reaper combat drone crashed over Al-Hasakah District, Al-Hasakah Governorate. Likely by friendly fire by SDF forces.
- 10 December 2024 – A Turkish TAI Aksungur combat drone was shot down over Ras al-Ayn District, Al-Hasakah Governorate.

== 2025 ==
- 1 January 2025 – A Turkish Bayraktar TB2 combat drone was shot down over Ayn al-Arab District, Aleppo Governorate by SDF forces.
- 21 March 2025 – A Su-24 was destroyed in the ground at T-4 Tiyas Air Base by Israeli forces.

== Totals ==
Aircraft & UAV losses
Country/belligerent	Destroyed
Jordan	3
Russia	26
Ba'athist Syria	147
(Syria) Syrian Arab Republic	1
Israel	7
(Islamic State) ISIL	3
Turkey	14
United States	14
Iran	4

Aircraft losses
Type	Destroyed
McDonnell Douglas F-4 Phantom II	1 (Turkey)
General Dynamics F-16 Fighting Falcon	3 (1 (United States) ,1 (Jordan) ,1 (Israel) )
Aero L-39 Albatros	19 (Syria)
Selex ES Falco	2 (Jordan)
Aérospatiale Gazelle	13 (Syria)
Antonov An-26	2 (1 (Syria) ,1 (Russia) )
Bell Boeing V-22 Osprey	1 (United States)
Boeing CH-47 Chinook	1 (United States)
Mil Mi-8 and Mil Mi-17	31 (29 (Syria) , 2 (Russia) )
Mil Mi-14	3 (Syria)
Mi-24/Mi-25	7 (1 (Russia) , 6 (Syria) )
Mil Mi-35	2 (Russia)
Mil Mi-28	2 (Russia)
Kamov Ka-52	1 (Russia)
Mikoyan-Gurevich MiG-21	18 (Syria)
Mikoyan-Gurevich MiG-23	20 (Syria)
Mikoyan MiG-29K	1 (Russia)
Mikoyan MiG-29SM	1 (Syria)
General Atomics MQ-1C Gray Eagle	3 (United States)
General Atomics MQ-9 Reaper	4 (United States)
Orlan-10	7 (Russia)
Yasir UAV	2 (Syria)
Ababil-3	2 (Syria)
Selex ES Falco	2 (Jordan)
Skylark UAV	4 (Israel)
Mohajer-4	1 (Syria)
Sukhoi Su-22	9 (Syria)
Sukhoi Su-24	11 (2 (Russia) , 8 (Syria) , 1 (Syria) )
Sukhoi Su-25	1 (Russia)
Sukhoi Su-30	1 (Russia)
Sukhoi Su-33	1 (Russia)
Shahed 129	2 (Iran)
Saegheh (UAV)	1 (Iran)
Sikorsky UH-60 Black Hawk	3 (1 (Turkey) , 2 (United States) )
TAI/AgustaWestland T129 ATAK	1 (Turkey)
Bayraktar Tactical UAS	1 (Turkey)
Bayraktar TB2	5 (Turkey)
TAI Anka	3 (Turkey)
TAI Aksungur	1 (Turkey)
IAI Heron	1 (Israel)
Boeing Insitu RQ-21 Blackjack	2 (United States)
Ilyushin Il-20	1 (Russia)
Unknown/Not identified	6 (1 (Israel) , 3 (Islamic State) , 1 (Turkey) ,1 (Iran) )

== See also ==
- List of aircraft shootdowns
- List of aviation shootdowns and accidents during the Libyan crisis
- List of aviation shootdowns and accidents during the Saudi Arabian–led intervention in Yemen
