= Latakia International Airport =

Airport in Jableh, Syria

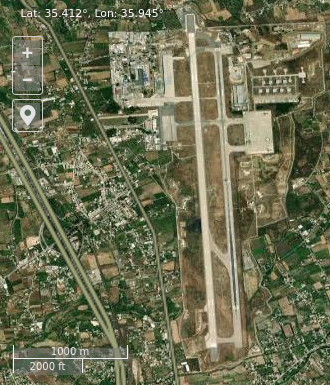
- Satellite imagery of Latakia International Airport

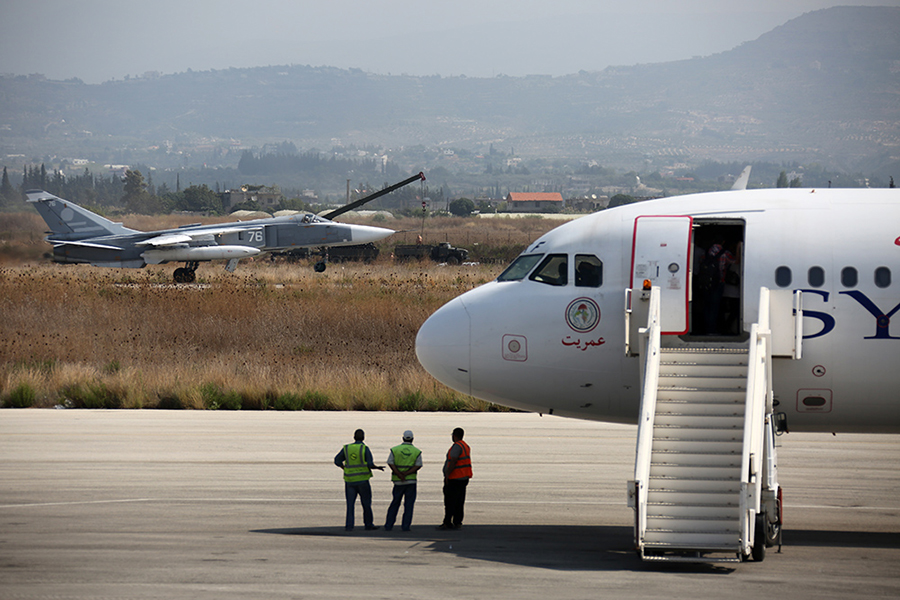
- IATA: LTK; ICAO: OSLK

Summary
- Airport type: Public / Military
- Owner: Government of Syria
- Operator: General Authority of Civil Aviation
- Serves: Latakia, Syria
- Location: Jableh
- Opened: 1983
- Hub for: Syrian Air
- Time zone: AST (UTC+03:00)
- Elevation AMSL: 157 ft (48 m)
- Coordinates: 35°24′03″N 35°56′55″E

Map
- Location of airport in Syria

Runways
Direction	Length		Surface
Direction	m	ft	Surface
17/35	2,797	9,175	Asphalt
- Source: DAFIF

Latakia International Airport (IATA: LTK, ICAO: OSLK) (Arabic: مطار اللاذقية الدولي, romanized: Maṭār al-Lādhiqīyah al-Duwalī) is an international airport serving Latakia, the principal port city of Syria.

== History ==
Until 2024, the airport was officially known as Bassel Al-Assad International Airport (Arabic: مطار باسل الأسد الدولي), named for Bassel al-Assad (1962–1994), son of former Syrian President Hafez al-Assad and brother of his successor Bashar al-Assad, who escaped to Russia with his family in December 2024 after the Fall of the Assad regime.

In 2025, negotiations between Syria and Russia stalled over control and the reopening of Latakia International Airport. Despite efforts by Damascus since late January, Russia refused to hand over the facility due to its proximity to the Khmeimim Air Base (operated by Russian forces) and ongoing security concerns. Moscow also demanded official recognition of its military presence at the Khmeimim and Tartus bases, further complicating the talks.

As of March 2026, the airport remains closed to civilian traffic and it has no airlines operating from it.

== Facilities ==
The passenger terminal opened in 1983; the tower was operational by 1989. The airport is at an elevation of 157 ft (48 m) above mean sea level. It has one runway designated 17/35 with an asphalt surface measuring 2,797 m × 45 m (9,177 ft × 148 ft).

== Military use ==
Adjacent to the civilian airport buildings is the Russian Khmeimim airbase, the principal Russian airbase being used in the air campaign in Syria since 30 September 2015. The name of the air base Хмеймим has been also transliterated as Hemeimeem Air Base and Hmeymin Air Base. Among the Russian servicemen posted, there were as of early October 2015 around 600 members of the Russian Naval Infantry, whose role is to help provide security for the airbase.

Russian military activity at Latakia Airport was revealed by American intelligence officials by early September 2015, with U.S. officials expressing concern. An Su-24 shot down by Turkish fighters on 24 November 2015 was said to be on its way back to Khmeimim.

The base, operative since 30 September 2015, can handle Antonov An-124 and Ilyushin Il-76 transport aircraft. It has parking locations for more than 50 military aircraft including Su-24s, Su-25s, and Su-34s. In addition, the base is home to T-90 tanks, BTR-82 vehicles, artillery and Mi-24 gunship helicopters and Mi-8 support choppers. Air-conditioned accommodations were erected within a few months in 2015. Other new structures include storage facilities, field kitchens, and refueling stations. Supplies are flown in from Russia or shipped via Tartus harbor 50 km away. On 26 November 2015, it was reported that S-400 missile system had been deployed by Russia.
