= Ja'Din shootdown incident =

Shoot down incident over Syria

- Part of the American-led intervention in the Syrian Civil War (Operation Inherent Resolve)
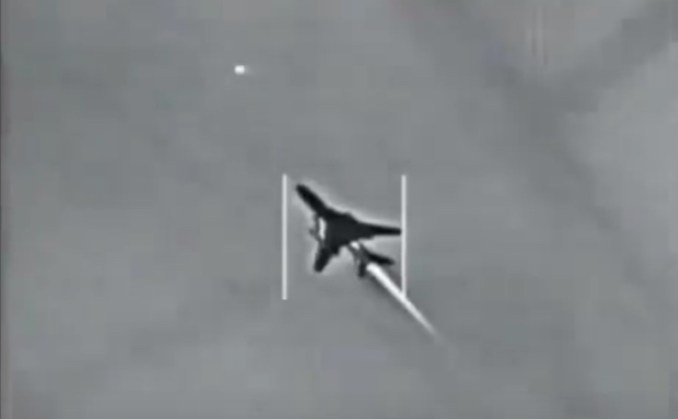
- Image taken from video footage of the incident recorded by an F/A-18
Date	18 June 2017
Location	Ja'Din, Raqqa Governorate, Syria 35°40′50″N 38°42′40″E
Result	US victory; Syrian Air Force Su-22 Fitter shot down: Further decline of US-Syria relations and US-Russia relations; SDF withdraws from Ja’Din; Australia temporarily suspends airstrikes in Syria

Belligerents
United States; Syrian Democratic Forces	Ba'athist Syria; Russia (present during incident, did not participate)

Commanders and leaders
VFA-87: Lt. Cmdr. Michael Tremel; Lt. Cmdr. Jeff Krueger; VFA-37: Lt. Cmdr. William Vuillet; Lt. Stephen Gasecki	(Syria) Captain Ali Fahd

Units involved
US Navy VAQ-131: CMDR. Clarity; VFA-87: Freedom 33; Freedom 34; VFA-37: Freedom 43; Freedom 44	Syrian Air Force Russian Air Force

Strength
United States: 2 F/A-18Es; 2 F/A-18Cs; 1 E-3 Sentry; 1 McDonnell Douglas KC-10 Extender	Syria: 1 Su-22 Fitter; Russia: 1 Su-27 (present during incident)

Casualties and losses
Unknown injured	(Syria) 1 Su-22 Fitter shot down
- Location of Ja'Din in Syria

On 18 June 2017, a United States Navy (USN) F/A-18E Super Hornet shot down a Syrian Air Force Su-22 Fitter with an AIM-120 AMRAAM missile after it reportedly attacked Kurdish Syrian Democratic Forces positions in the town of Ja'Din. It was the first time the U.S. shot down a crewed aircraft since 1999 and the first with the F/A-18E/F variant.

The downing triggered quick condemnation from Russia and Syria with both nations claiming it to be a violation of international law and Syrian sovereignty. The Syrian pilot, Captain Ali Fahd, successfully ejected from his aircraft and was found alive by Syrian troops one day later in the village of Shuwaihat. The F/A-18E pilot, Lieutenant Commander Michael Tremel, was awarded the Distinguished Flying Cross in September 2018 for his actions during the incident.

== Background ==
The United States and other Coalition partners began combat operations in Syria on 23 September 2014 against the Islamic State of Iraq and the Levant (ISIL) and al-Nusra Front. Before operations began the Syrian Government stated that "any action of any kind without the consent of the Syrian Government would be an attack on Syria". However, when the first airstrikes began the Syrian military did not respond and set radar to passive. Syria's foreign minister later suggested that Syria and the US-led Coalition were on the same side. The Coalition wouldn't attack Syrian military positions until September 2016 when warplanes from the United States, Australia, Denmark, and the United Kingdom launched 37 airstrikes on Syrian forces in Deir ez-Zor Airport killing 106 soldiers. In response Syria canceled a ceasefire forged by diplomats from the United States and Russia. The Coalition claimed it had misidentified the Syrian soldiers as ISIL militants while Syria claimed it as a deliberate attack.

In April 2017, the first deliberate military action against the Syrian Arab Republic occurred when the United States bombed the Shayrat Airbase in response to the Shaykun chemical attack. Two months later on 6 June, the United States conducted airstrikes on pro-government forces, killing an unknown number of fighters. Two days later, an American F-15E Strike Eagle shot down an Iranian operated drone. Due to the fluid nature of events the rules of engagement were constantly changing. Sometime before June the aircraft carrier USS George H.W. Bush deployed to the Eastern Mediterranean Sea south of Crete. During the carrier's operations the fighter crews were warned to be ready to defend from a third party aerial attack as a consequence of the recent events.

== Incident ==
Earlier in the day on 18 June, Syrian Government forces attacked SDF positions in Ja'Din, wounding several fighters and prompting Coalition aircraft to respond with a show of force, stopping the attack. Several airstrikes also had been conducted by pilots on board the George H.W. Bush on ISIL targets in Syria. After their pre-mission briefing, F/A-18E pilots Lieutenant Commander Michael "Mob" Tremel (call sign Freedom 33) and wingman Jeff Krueger (call sign Freedom 34) were sent from the carrier into Syria as the second wave of aircraft that day. Along with Tremel and his wingman were two F/A-18C Hornets, call signs Freedom 43 and 44, piloted by William Vuillet and Stephen Gasecki. The four fighters took the northern route along Syria's coastline through Russian and Turkish air defense range and headed toward the city of Raqqa. Over the city, they established communication with the joint terminal attack controller who was on the ground just south of Al-Tabqa. In the vicinity of the controller, they were available to provide close air support to friendly SDF forces fighting on the ground. During this time, a Russian Air Force Su-27 Flanker appeared and began flying overhead.

=== Shootdown ===
Tremel, who was having problems with his targeting pod, began tracking the Russian jet and checking his radar for other aircraft while the three other Hornets remained available to provide close air support. At this point, another aircraft appeared on his radar moving at high speed. Tremel, believing it to be Syrian, moved to intercept and identified it as a Syrian Air Force Su-22 Fitter. After identifying it, Tremel radioed an airborne command and control post and began sending warnings to the Syrian aircraft to divert its course. When that failed, Tremel flew over the Fitter's canopy and released flares. When that also failed to elicit a response, the Su-22 was in range of friendly forces on the ground, and at 6:43 p.m. local time, dived down and dropped ordnance on SDF fighters in the town of Ja'Din, causing injuries. Following the rules of engagement, Tremel locked onto the aircraft with an AIM-9 Sidewinder and fired. The Su-22 released flares and was able to successfully avoid the missile. Tremel then quickly locked on with an AIM-120 AMRAAM missile and fired at the Syrian aircraft, hitting it and blowing up on the jet's rear section.

The Syrian Army claimed that the Su-22 was on a mission to strike Daesh (ISIL) when the downing occurred.

== Aftermath ==
The Su-22 shook violently as it fell to the ground. The Syrian pilot, Captain Ali Fahd, ejected before the plane exploded and turned on his emergency transponder. Tremel and his wingman were now deep inside enemy air defense range with the Russian Su-27 still overhead. With clearance from the joint terminal air controller, they departed the area. A nearby KC-10 Extender refueled the fighters. Tremel and his wingman were cleared to return to the carrier, taking the route through Iraq. The two F/A-18Cs were ordered to provide close air support for Iraqi forces fighting the Islamic State in Mosul. The two F/A-18Cs conducted airstrikes before finally returning to the Bush.

Immediately after the shootdown, clashes broke out between Government forces and Coalition-backed Syrian Democratic Forces near Al-Resafa, according to the Syrian Observatory for Human Rights (SOHR).

Following the downing, the SDF withdrew from Ja'Din after being attacked by pro-Government militiamen, according to The Pentagon.

Captain Ali Fahd, the pilot of the Su-22, was found alive in the village of Shuwaihat by Government forces the next day.

Two days after the shootdown, a US F-15 fighter jet shot down another Iranian-operated Shahed 129 armed drone in the same area where the Su-22 was brought down, making it the third aircraft shootdown of a pro-Government aircraft that month.

In September 2017, at a Tailhook Association panel, the Hornet and Super Hornet pilots involved in the incident gave a moment-by-moment eyewitness account of the incident and surrounding events.

=== Reactions ===
- The US-led coalition stated, "The coalition does not seek to fight Syrian government, Russian or pro-government forces partnered with them but will not hesitate to defend coalition or partner forces from any threat. The demonstrated hostile intent and actions of pro-government forces toward coalition and partner forces in Syria conducting legitimate counter-ISIS operations will not be tolerated."
- (Syria) A statement released by the Syrian Army stated, "Flagrant attack was an attempt to undermine the efforts of the army as the only effective force capable with its allies ... in fighting terrorism across its territory. This comes at a time when the Syrian army and its allies were making clear advances in fighting Daesh (Islamic State) terrorist group." On state-run media, the Syrian Army also said that the Su-22 was on a mission to strike IS forces when it came under fire.
- The Russian Government quickly condemned the downing and took immediate action by temporarily suspending its hotline with the US Coalition. The Russian MoD viewed it as blatant aggression towards Syria, stating, "Syrian air force aircraft destroying American aviation in Syrian airspace, cynical violation of the sovereignty of the Syrian Arab Republic. Repeated [h]ostilities [by] [a]viation [elements of the] USA under the guise of 'fighting terrorism' against the legitimate armed forces [of] United Nations Member States, are a flagrant violation of international law and in fact military aggression towards the Syrian Arab Republic." Russia also threatened that Coalition aircraft west of the Euphrates River were now considered potential targets.
- Australia suspended its airstrikes in Syria in response to rising tensions between the US and Russia over the downing and as a precaution in response to the Russian threat.

== See also ==
- 2015 Russian Sukhoi Su-24 shootdown
- List of aviation shootdowns and accidents during the Syrian Civil War
