= 2018 Russian Air Force Antonov An-26 crash =

2018 plane crash in Syria

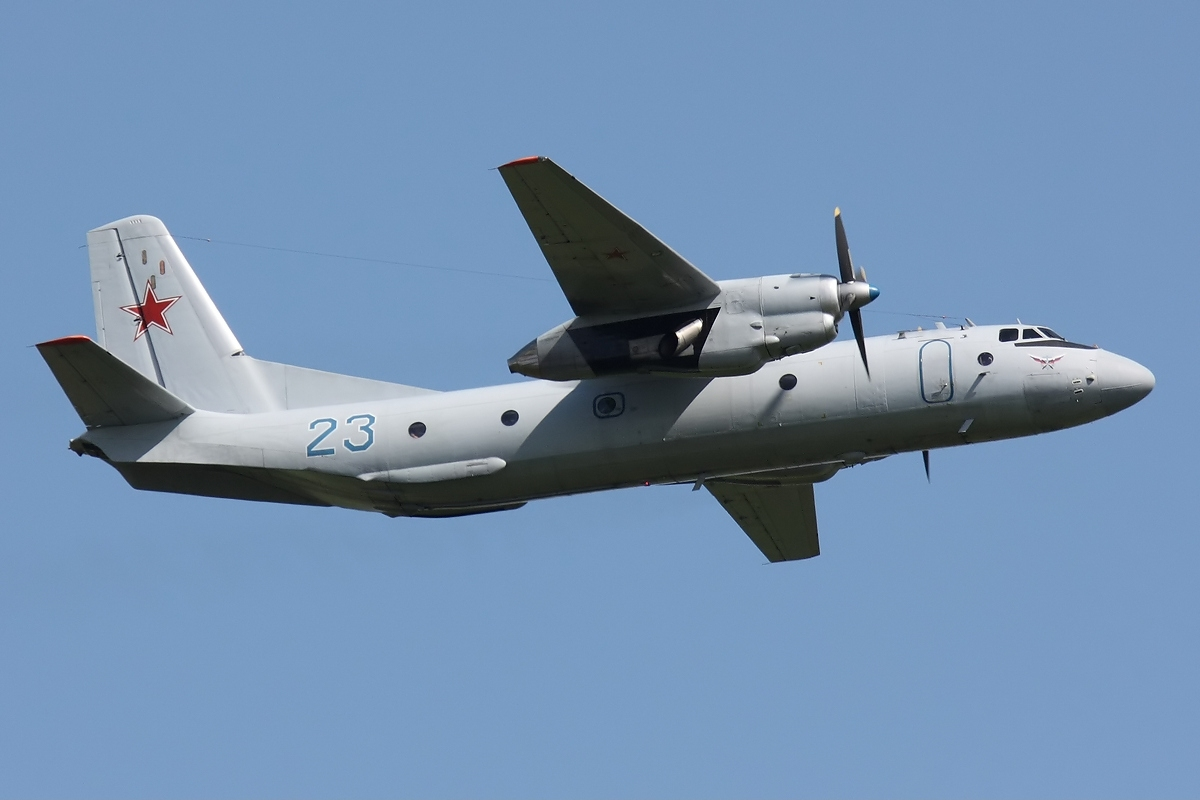
- A Russian Air Force Antonov An-26 similar to the one involved

Accident
- Date: 6 March 2018
- Summary: Loss of control on final approach
- Site: Near Khmeimim Air Base, Syria

Aircraft
- Aircraft type: Antonov An-26
- Operator: Russian Air Force
- Registration: RF-92955
- Flight origin: Kuweires air base, Syria
- Destination: Khmeimim air base, Syria
- Occupants: 39
- Passengers: 33
- Crew: 6
- Fatalities: 39
- Survivors: 0

On 6 March 2018, an Antonov An-26 transport aircraft crashed on approach to Khmeimim air base in Syria, killing all 39 people on board. All of them were servicemen of the Russian Armed Forces, including Major-General Vladimir Yeremeyev.

== Aircraft ==
The accident aircraft was an Antonov An-26, registration RF-92955, msn 10107. It had first flown in 1980. This accident is the fifteenth An-26 fatal crash in this decade with a total of 159 deaths, none of these flights were scheduled passenger airline operations.

== Accident ==
On the day of the accident, the aircraft was alleged to transport Russian military staff established in Syria from Kuweires Military Airbase to Khmeimim air base.

At about 14:00 local time (12:00 UTC), the aircraft crashed in approach to the air base at about 500 metres (1,640 ft) from the runway, killing all 39 occupants (33 passengers and 6 crew members). Based on reports from the location, the Russian Ministry of Defense ruled out the possibility that it was shot down. The preliminary cause was attributed to technical malfunction. The Investigative Committee of Russia and the Russian Military Prosecutor's Office opened criminal cases concerning the crash.

=== Shootdown claims ===
The Islamic militant group Jaysh al-Islam later claimed the responsibility for the crash; according to Ad-Diyar, five militants shot at the aircraft with heavy machine guns when it was 100 m from the ground. It was suggested that the claim might be false, as the group has made opportunistic claims in the past, as have some other groups.

== Cause ==
The accident was caused by a Wind shear occurred during the final phase of the approach leading to a loss of control and subsequent crash short of the runway.
