= Qods Yasir =

Iranian unmanned aerial vehicle

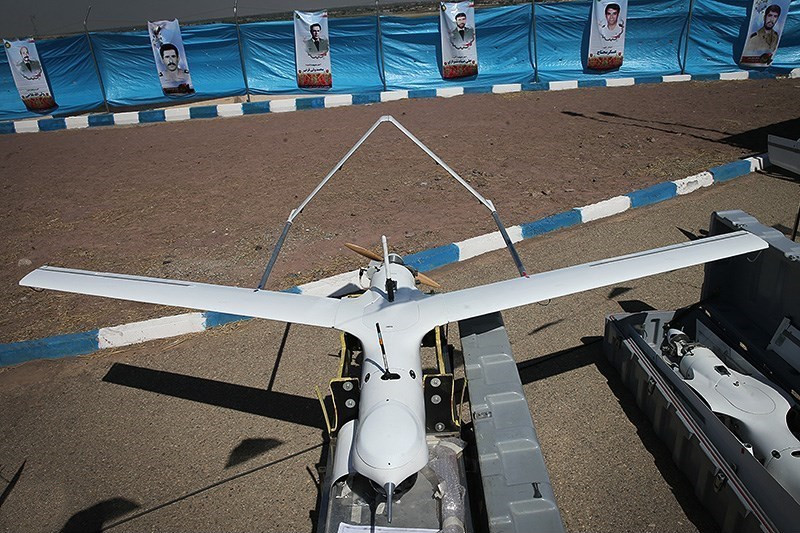

General information
- Type: Unmanned aerial vehicle
- National origin: Iran
- Designer: Qods Aviation Industry Company
- Status: in production and in service
- Primary users: Iran Syria

History
- Manufactured: 2013–onwards
- Introduction date: September 28, 2013
- Developed from: Boeing Insitu ScanEagle

The Qods Yasir (Persian: یاسر), also known as the Sayed-2, is an Iranian light tactical surveillance and reconnaissance unmanned aerial vehicle (UAV) manufactured by Qods Aviation. It is ostensibly an unlicensed copy of an American Boeing Insitu ScanEagle drone captured and reverse-engineered by Iran, but has some design changes.

Iran captured a Scaneagle in December 2012 and the Qods Yasir was unveiled about ten months later, in September 2013. The Yasir's only state operators are Iran and Syria. It has been exported to at least one non-state actor and is alleged to have been exported to several more.

Yasir UAVs have been used by Iranian allies in the civil wars in Iraq and Syria, likely because of their small footprint compared to larger Iranian UAVs.

== Development ==
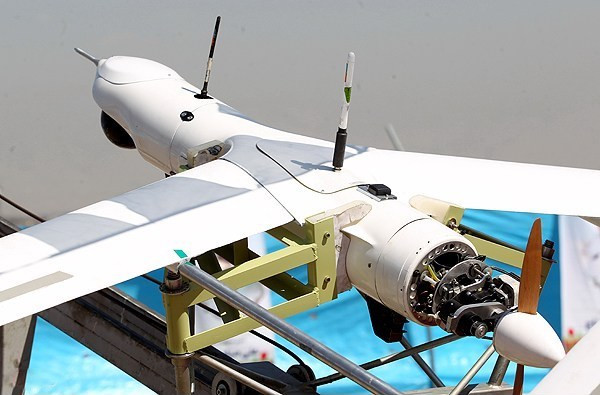
A Yasir on launcher.

On 4 December 2012 Iran said it had captured an American Boeing Insitu ScanEagle that violated its airspace over the Persian Gulf. The U.S. Navy stated that none of its ScanEagles were missing. However, there are other ScanEagle operators in the Middle East. Later that month, on 17 December 2012, Iran amended their claim to three ScanEagles and said they would attempt to reverse engineer and mass-produce the ScanEagle. Iran also claimed that they had already reverse-engineered, mass-produced, and entered the ScanEagle into service. The UAV was unveiled to the media in September 2013 when it entered service and received the name "Yasir."

In October 2013, the IRGC presented Russian Air Force Commander Lieutenant General Viktor Bondarev with a Yasir drone as a gift.

== Design ==
The Yasir has swept back wings and a large payload bubble under its nose. Unlike the ScanEagle, it has an inverted V-tail and a twin-boom empennage. The Yasir has a single, unidentified, two-bladed propeller engine. It carries an electro-optical payload. It can also be fitted with an explosive payload for use as a disposable strike munition.

The Yasir is 1.19 meters long, has a wingspan of 3.05 meters, and weighs 18 kg. This is similar to, but slightly smaller than the ScanEagle. It has a speed of 120 km/h, a max endurance of 20 hours, a 16,000 ceiling, and a communications link distance of up to 100 km.

== Operational history ==
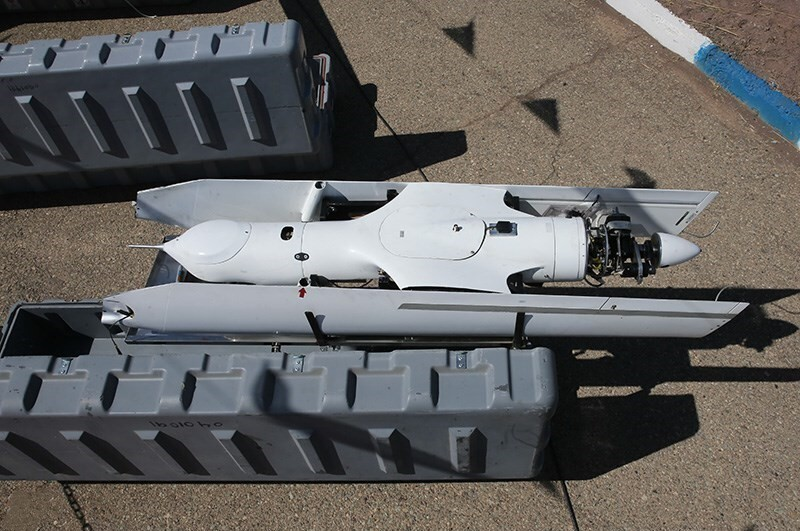
A disassembled Yasir on its carrying case

=== Iran ===
At least some Yasirs are located at Iran's Qeshm Island drone base.

=== Lebanon ===
Following the repetitive flying in early 2014 of an unidentified UAV over Lebanese Forces leader Samir Geagea's Ma'arab complex, MP Antoine Zahra accused Hezbollah of flying a Yasir UAV in order to monitor and possibly assassinate Geagea. Israeli sources say Hezbollah has flown Yasir UAVs as well.

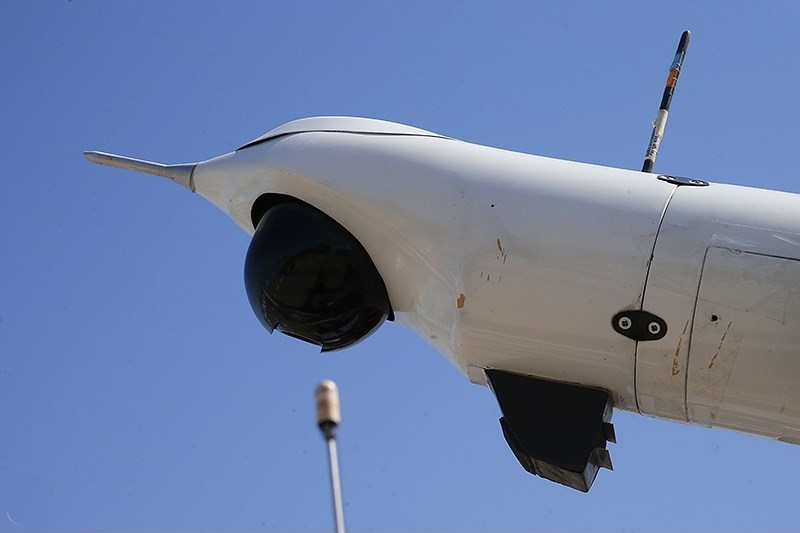
Sensor

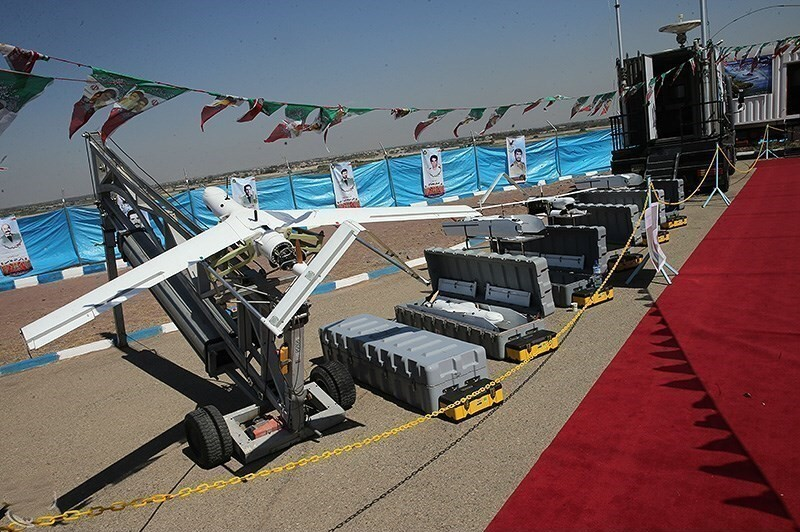
UAV with launcher

=== Iraq ===
The Iraqi Shia militia Harakat Hizballah al-Nujaba has received six Yasir UAVs. Kataib Hezbollah has also reportedly received the Yasir UAV, though they rarely use it. The Shiite militia "Jund al-Imam Ali" has also apparently received Yasir UAVs.

=== Syria ===
A Yasir UAVs operated by the Syrian Army were seen over Damascus in 2013. They have also been spotted over Homs and Aleppo. At least 3 Syrian Yasir UAVs were shot down by Al-Nusra Front.

== Operators ==
=== State operators ===
Iran

- IRGC
- Islamic Republic of Iran Army Ground Forces

Syria

- Syrian Arab Army

=== Non-state operators ===
- Harakat Hezbollah al-Nujaba
- Hezbollah (alleged)
- Kata'ib Hezbollah (alleged)
- Kata'ib al-Imam Ali (alleged)

== Specifications ==
Data from Drones Operating in Syria and Iraq and Tasnim News

General characteristics

- Crew: none
- Length: 1.19 m (3 ft 11 in)
- Wingspan: 3.05 m (10 ft 0 in)
- Gross weight: 19 kg (42 lb)
- Propellers: 2-bladed

Performance

- Cruise speed: 120 km/h (75 mph, 65 kn)
- Range: 100 km (62 mi, 54 nmi)
- Endurance: 8 h or 20 h
- Service ceiling: 4,600 m (15,000 ft)

== See also ==
- Iran–U.S. RQ-170 incident – An earlier and similar incident of an American UAV captured by Iran.
