= Khmeimim Air Base =

Russian airbase near Latakia, Syria

Hmeymim Air Base (Latakia Air Base)
- Авиабаза «Хмеймим» قَاعِدَةُ حُمَيْمِيمِ الْجَوِّيَّةِ
- Latakia International Airport; Near Hmeimim in Syria
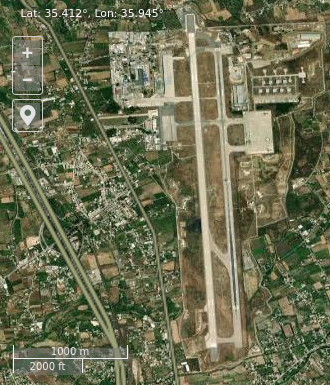
- Satellite imagery of Khmeimim Air Base

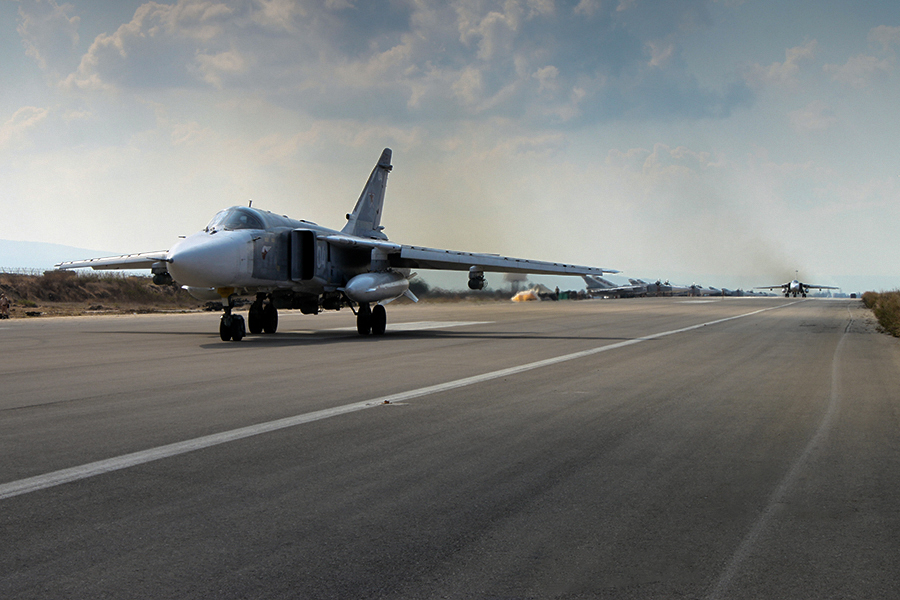
- A Russian Su-24 bomber at Khmeimim Air Base

Site information
- Owner: Syria
- Operator: Russia
- Controlled by: Russian Armed Forces

Location
- Position in Syria
- Coordinates: 35°24′42″N 35°56′42″E

Site history
- Built: 2015
- In use: 2015–present

Airfield information
- Elevation: 48 metres (157 ft) AMSL
Runways
Direction	Length and surface
17R/35L	2,797 metres (9,177 ft) Asphalt
17L/35R	2,797 metres (9,177 ft) Asphalt

Khmeimim Air Base (Russian: Хмеймим), also Hmeimim Air Base (Arabic: حميميم), is a Syrian airbase currently operated by Russia, located south-east of the city of Latakia in Hmeimim, Latakia Governorate, Syria and approximately 2 miles north-east of the coastal town of Jableh. The airbase shares some airfield facilities with Latakia Airport. The legal status of the base is regulated by a treaty Russia and Syria signed in August 2015. At the end of 2017, Russia said it had decided to turn the Khmeimim base into a component of its permanent military contingent stationed in Syria.

During the late stages of the Syrian civil war, following 2024 Syrian opposition offensives and the military offensive of a Turkish-backed coalition of forces organized as the Syrian National Army, the Assad regime fell and the Russian base in Latakia came under threat. On 7 December 2024, it was reported that Russia was preparing to evacuate its assets from the airbase. Russian forces were observed transferring S-400 and Tor air defence systems to their naval base at Tartus. On 8 December, Russian control of the airbase was under serious threat from advancing rebel forces. Bashar al-Assad, until then president of Syria, said that he went to the airbase after his opponents were closing in on Damascus, and that he was then evacuated to Russia on 8 December although he wanted to continue fighting. Later reports emerged that opposition "had no plans to penetrate" military bases, and Russia prefers to deal with new Syrian leadership.

== Name ==
The name of the village in Arabic is حميميم, usually rendered as Hmeimim or Humaymim in English.

The Russian name of the air base, Хмеймим, has also been transliterated in English as Hemeimeem and Hmeymim.

== History ==
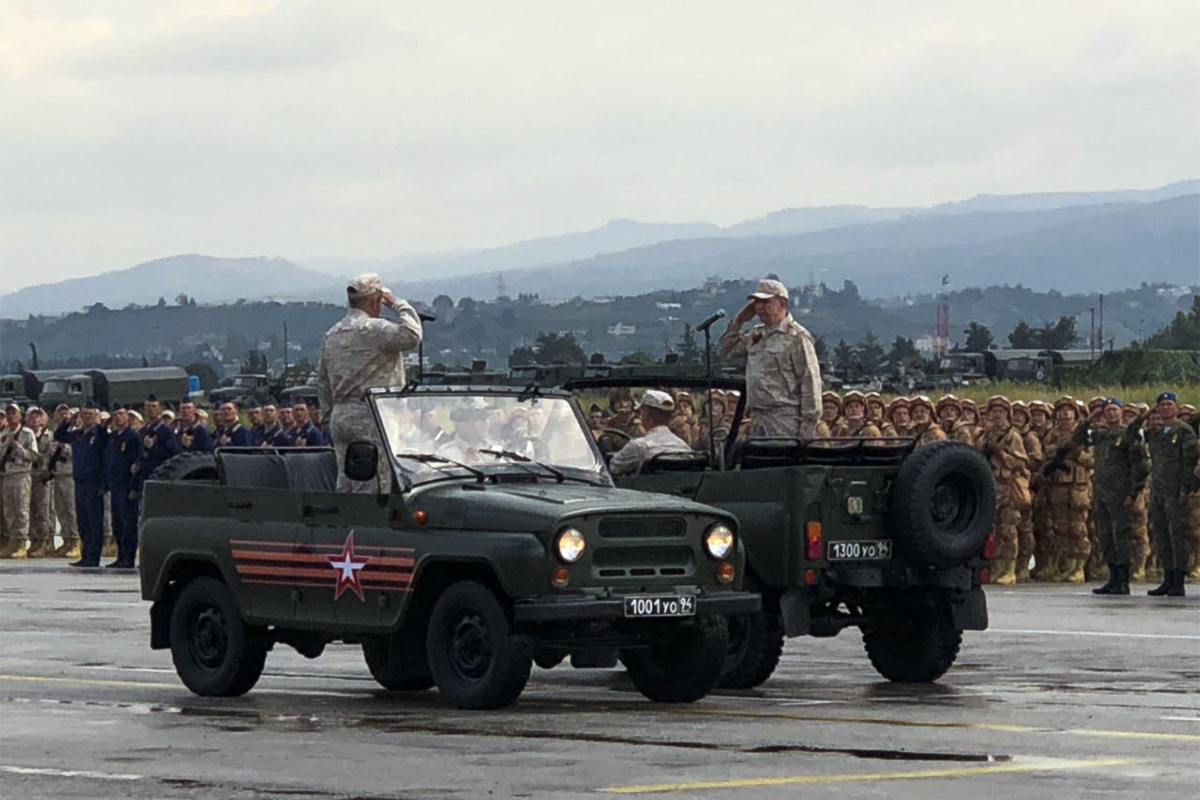
A parade at the airbase in 2018.

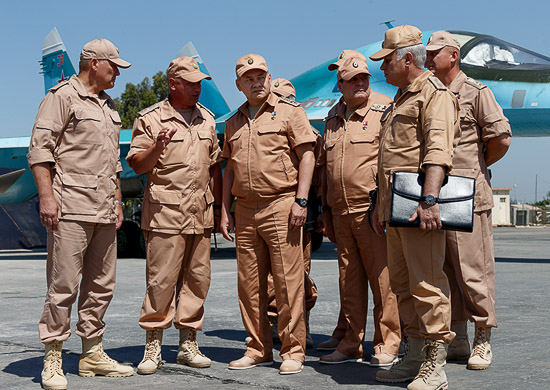
Aleksandr Dvornikov (2nd from the left) briefing Defense Minister Sergey Shoigu alongside other Russian advisors at the airbase in 2016.

Khmeimim air base was built in mid-2015 adjacent to the Latakia International Airport to serve as "the strategic center of Russian military intervention on behalf of the Syrian government in the Syrian Civil War (2011-present). The existence of the Russian strategic base was revealed by the United States in early September 2015 and American officials expressed concern over the possibility of escalation of the conflict in Syria. The airbase became operational on 30 September 2015.

On 26 August 2015, in Damascus, Russia and Syria signed a treaty that stipulates terms and conditions of use by Russia of Syria's Khmeimim Airport, free of charge and with no time limit. The treaty, ratified by Russia's parliament and signed into law by president Vladimir Putin in October 2016, grants Russia's personnel and their family members jurisdictional immunity and other privileges as envisaged by Vienna Convention on Diplomatic Relations. The Syrian military is in charge of protecting the base perimeter, while the Russian side is responsible for air defense and internal policing of base personnel. The treaty was amended by signing a protocol to the treaty on 18 January 2017.

In late December 2017, Russia announced it had set about "forming a permanent grouping" at Khmeimim as well as at its naval facility in Tartus, after president Putin approved the structure and the personnel strength of the Tartus and Hmeymim bases.

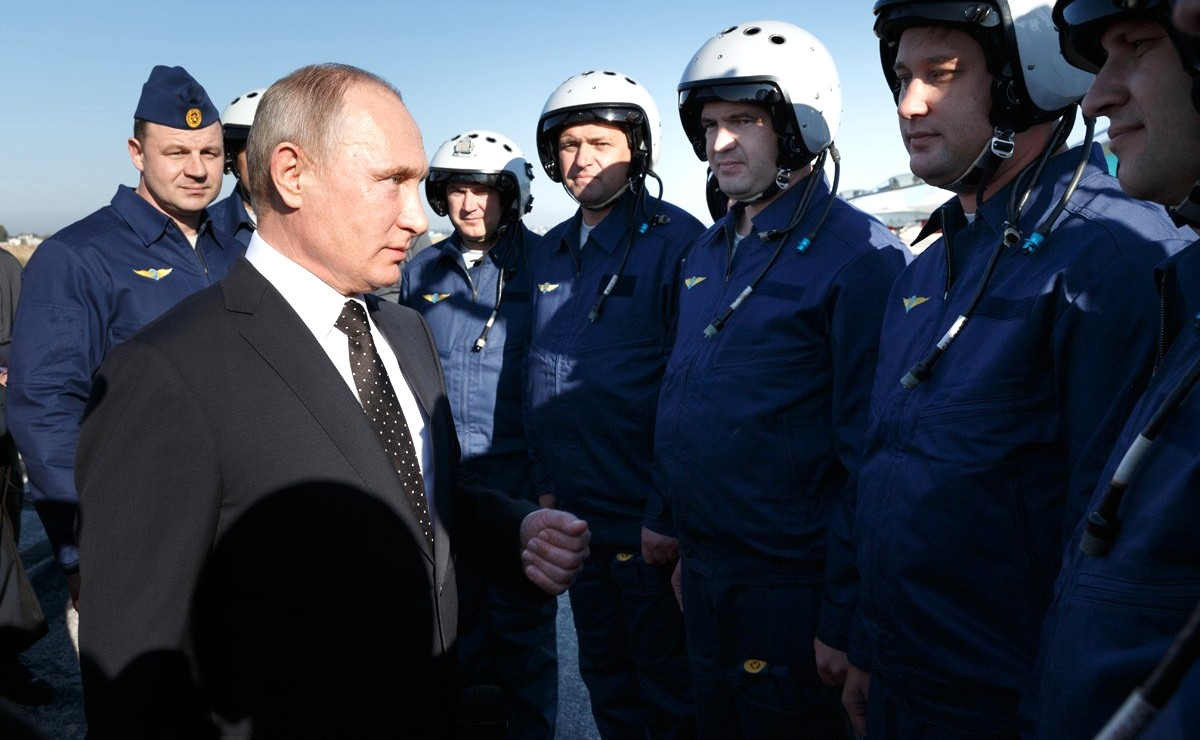
Vladimir Putin and Russian pilots at Khmeimim, on 11 December 2017.

During the 2024 Syrian opposition offensives, on 7 December, it was reported that an An-124 transport aircraft had arrived at the airbase, suggesting that Russia was preparing to evacuate its assets. Russian forces were observed transferring S-400 and Tor air defence systems to their naval base at Tartus. On 8 December, Russian control of the airbase was under serious threat from advancing rebel forces. Reuters later reported that deposed Syrian president Bashar al-Assad had made a stopover on the base as he went into exile in Russia.

Syrian Alawite civilians and their families fled to Khmeimim Air Base to seek refuge from the sectarian violence in March 2025.

== Operation ==
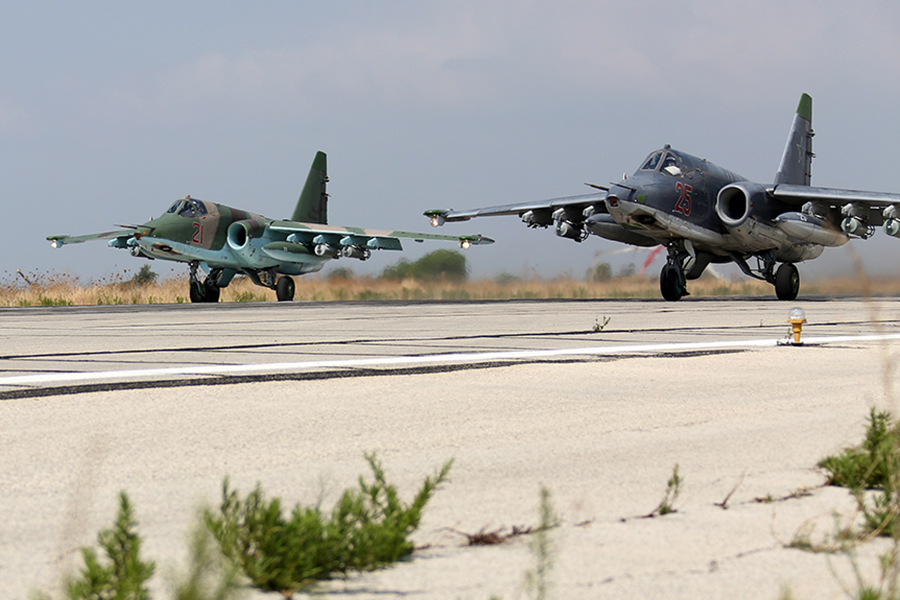
Russian aircraft at Khmeimim on 3 October 2015.

Within several months in 2015 new infrastructure was built: air-conditioned accommodation for approximately 1,000 people, an air traffic control tower, runway extensions, storage facilities, field kitchens, and refuelling stations. Supplies were flown in from Russia or shipped via Tartus harbour 50 km (31 mi) away. The base is reported to be capable of handling Antonov An-124 Ruslan and Ilyushin Il-76M transport aircraft; the deployed aircraft included Sukhoi Su-24Ms, Sukhoi Su-25s, and Sukhoi Su-34s, reconnaissance aircraft Il-20M as well as T-90 tanks, BTR-82 vehicles, artillery, with Mil Mi-24, Mi-28, Ka-52 gunships and Mil Mi-8 support helicopters.

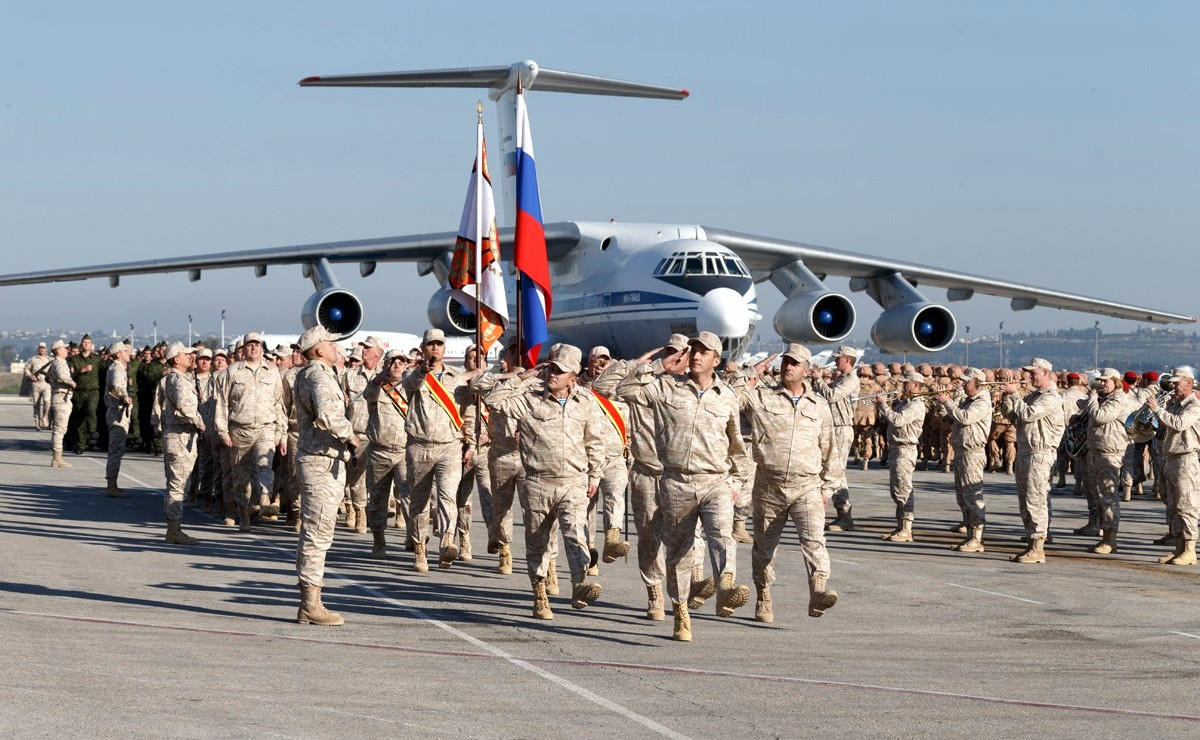
Parade of the units stationed at Khmeimim (11 December 2017).

After the 24 November 2015 shootdown of a Su-24M, a S-400 defensive missile system was installed, allowing Russia to defend the air space from Southern Turkey to Northern Israel.

At the end of January 2016, Sukhoi Su-35 fighter jets started to be deployed. In February 2016, one Tupolev Tu-214R was reported to have been deployed.

At the end of February 2016 and in response to developments at the Geneva peace talks, a truce coordination center had been established at the airbase to coordinate activities of warring parties and "render maximum assistance" to all parties participating in recent ceasefire agreements; the center will not support ISIL, Al-Nusra, and terrorist groups so designated by the UN Security Council.

The Sixth Directorate of the Russian GRU reportedly operated a signals intelligence station by the airport.

In 2018, satellite imagery analysis showed Russia had constructed hangars at the airbase to shelter aircraft from drone attacks and the sun. Construction began in June 2018 and was completed by December 2018.

In 2021, both Tu-22M3 Backfire long-range bombers and Su-35 fighters operating from the base were reported engaged in training flights over the eastern Mediterranean.

== Major incidents ==
In November 2016, after the Russian aircraft carrier Admiral Kuznetsov lost a MiG-29K fighter due to arrestor cable problems, satellite images indicated that at least some of the carrier's air wing of MiG-29K and Sukhoi Su-33 aircraft had been deployed to Khmeimim.

On 3 January 2018, the Kommersant reported that rebel shelling on 31 December 2017 caused the deaths of 2 Russian military personnel and the loss of at least seven aircraft stationed on the base; the Russian MoD on 4 January 2018 acknowledged the attack, and confirmed that two servicemen had been killed, but denied that any jets had been disabled. According to Roman Saponkov, a Russian military journalist who posted photographs of the aftermath of the attack on the same day that the Russian MoD published its statement, ten aircraft had been damaged but none destroyed. An article on /Drive said that key questions about the attack were still unanswered despite the Russian MoD's communique.

On 12 January 2018, the Russian MoD announced that the military had eliminated the group of militants that shelled the Khmeimim airbase, close to the western border of Idlib province, in a special operation, and that a drone assembly and storage depot in Idlib province had also been destroyed. Krasnopol precision projectiles were used in both strikes.

On 6 March 2018, a Russian Antonov An-26 transport plane crash during an attempted landing at the airbase killed all 39 military personnel on board. The Russian MoD said that the plane was not fired upon, and preliminary data suggested that a technical malfunction had caused the crash.

On 19 September 2018, a Russian Ilyushin Il-20 aircraft coming in to land was shot down by Syrian air defenses targeting Israeli aircraft in a friendly fire incident. The Russian Defense Ministry said that four Israeli F-16 fighter jets had attacked targets in Syria's Latakia after approaching from the Mediterranean. The Israeli warplanes had approached at a low altitude and "created a dangerous situation for other aircraft and vessels in the region. ... The Israeli pilots used the Russian plane as cover and set it up to be targeted by the Syrian air defense forces. As a consequence, the Il-20, which has radar cross-section much larger than the F-16, was shot down by an S-200 system missile," the statement said, adding that 15 Russian military service members were killed. On 3 October 2024 it was reported that the Israel Defense Forces had attacked a weapons dump in or near Khmeimim.

On the morning of 20 May 2025, insurgents from the group Burkan al-Furat attacked the perimeter of the base and engaged in a firefight with Russian troops stationed there. Preliminary reports suggest at least three of the attackers and two of the Russian defenders were killed.

== Drone attacks ==
On 6 January 2018, Russian forces thwarted a drone (UAV) swarm attack on the base, the first of this kind in the history of warfare. Statements from Russia's MoD on 8 and 10 January confirmed earlier reports about the incident, saying that the attempted attack, by 13 armed, fixed-wing drones which were used to attack both the Hmeimim base and the Tartus naval facility on 5–6 January, was repulsed by the Russian forces' radio-electronic warfare technologies; it also denied earlier reports that a greater number of UAVs were involved in the attack and said that the drones could have been obtained only from a country that possessed "high-tech capabilities for providing satellite navigation and remote control."

Referring to the 6 January swarm attack on 25 October, Russian Deputy Defense Minister Colonel General Alexander Fomin said that "Thirteen drones moved according to common combat battle deployment, operated by a single crew. During all this time the American Poseidon-8 reconnaissance plane patrolled the Mediterranean Sea area for eight hours," according to a TASS article which provided details on the operation, claiming that the Poseidon managed the attack, and the drones were switched from autonomous to manual control. Further analysis was provided by Editor-in-Chief of National Defense journal Igor Korotchenko stating "There were three such goals: uncovering the Russian air defense system in Syria, carrying out radio-electronic reconnaissance and inflicting actual harm to our servicemen in Syria," in a 2nd TASS article providing further information on the Russian analysis of the attack and the official Russian belief that it was a Pentagon operation. In a statement to Military Times the Pentagon said "Any suggestion that U.S. or coalition forces played a role in an attack on a Russian base is without any basis in fact and is utterly irresponsible," in an article covering the likelihood of the Russian claims.

On 24 April, the airbase was targeted by another wave of drones in a swarm attack. Russian forces reported they had intercepted and destroyed several "small-size unidentified airborne targets" while they approached the base.

On 30 June, Russian air defences repelled another drone attack on the base, shooting down multiple unidentified unmanned aerial vehicles. During July and August 2018, the airbase was targeted by multiple drone attacks, all were repelled. In August 2018, a total of 47 drones were reported shot down by Russian air defenses. 50 drones were shot down in September–October 2018.

There were three more attacks in August 2019.

Air defense and electronic warfare systems deployed at Russia's Hmeymim air base in Syria have shot down or disabled over 100 drones during terrorists' attempted attacks on the military facility over the past two years, Defense Ministry Spokesman Major-General Igor Konashenkov said on 27 September 2019.

On 19 January 3 and 11 February 22 June and 11 July 2020, and also on 27 September 2021 Russian air defense systems repelled drone attacks.

On 18 February 2025, the Khmeimim Air Base was reportedly attacked with drones. While no group immediately claimed responsibility, a Russian milblogger claimed that Hay'at Tahrir al-Sham was behind the attack. The Russian nor the Syrian interim governments confirmed these reports.

== Status after the fall of Assad ==
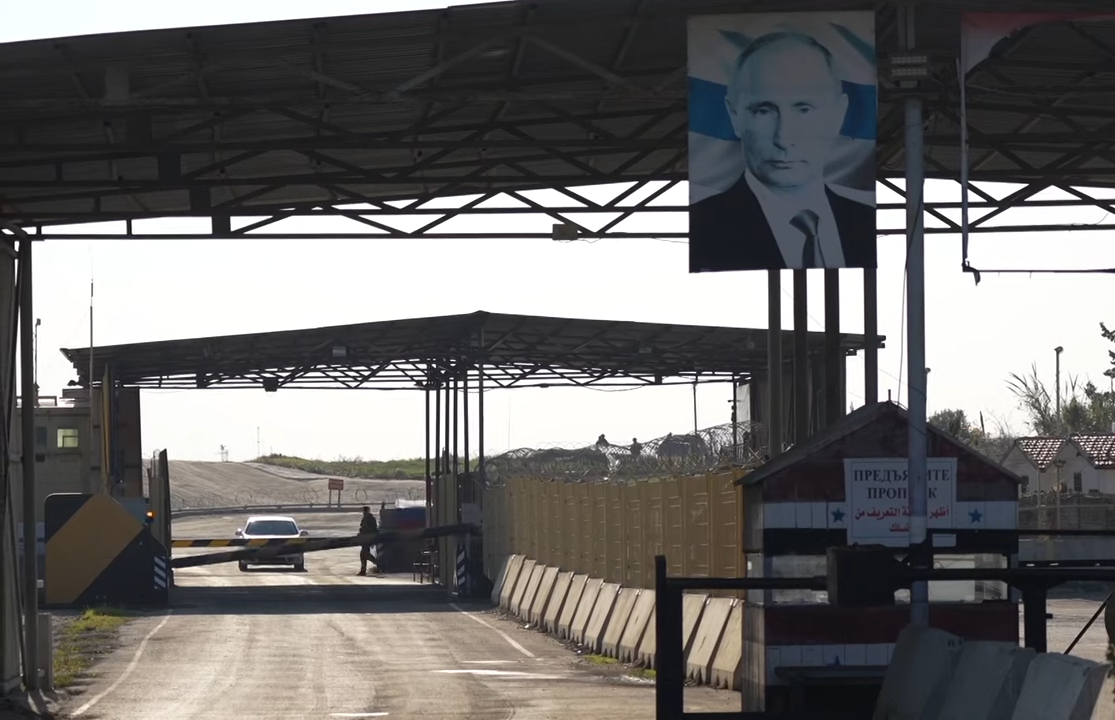
Entrance to the Khmeimim Air Base with Russian presence after Assad's fall. The image of Bashar al-Assad torn down by Russian soldiers, 18 December 2024

On 7 December 2024, during a Syrian opposition offensive which ultimately toppled the Assad regime, TheWarZone magazine reported signs of possible evacuation at the airbase. Multiple large transport aircraft arrived at the base, including three Il-76s and one An-124. One An-72 is typically forward based there. The Russian contingent at base evacuated air defense systems to the port of Tartus. As of October 2025, the Russian military remained in control of Khmeimim Air Base and its naval base in Tartus, with its future uncertain. Syria's new leader, Ahmed al-Sharaa, said both Iran and Russia are important partners for Syria, and expressed a desire to maintain positive relations with both.

On 9 August 2026, the Syrian Foreign Ministry reported that the Syrian civilian administration will resume control of the airport, with the base to be reorganized into a joint training and qualification center over a period of three months, following an agreement between the two countries.

== Reactions ==
At the end of September 2015, NATO's Supreme Allied Commander Europe, General Philip Breedlove, said that the kind of military infrastructure that Russia had installed in Syria, which included anti-aircraft defence systems, was a de facto no-fly zone: "As we see the very capable air defense [systems] beginning to show up in Syria, we're a little worried about another A2/AD [anti-access/area denial] bubble being created in the eastern Mediterranean." (Russia's third denial zone around Europe)

== In popular culture ==
Khmeimim Airbase was the subject of Russian rapper Akim Apachev's 2021 song "Хмеймим" (Khmeimim).

== See also ==
- Tartus naval base
- Mediterranean Sea Task Force
- Drone warfare
