= 2015 Russian Sukhoi Su-24 shootdown =

Turkish shootdown near the Syrian border

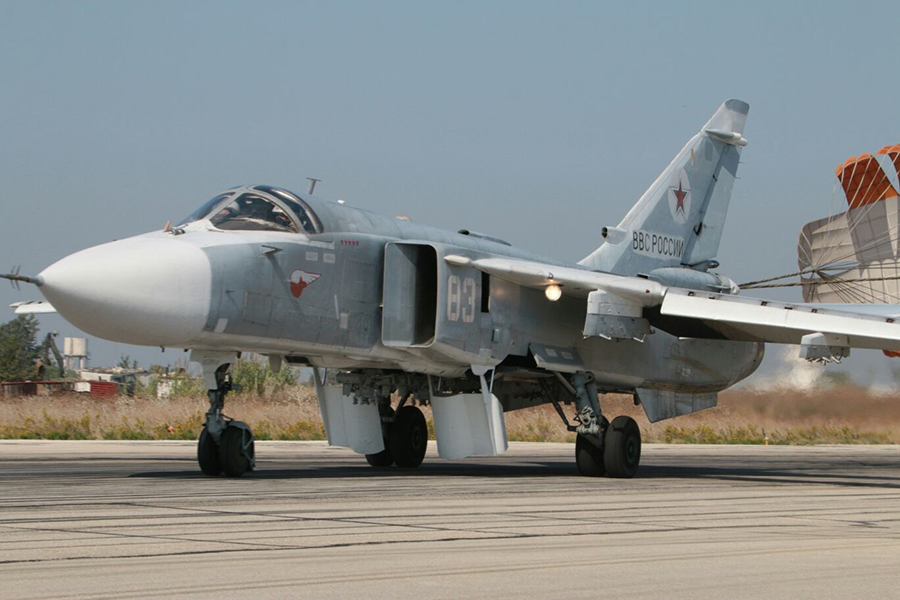
- The Su-24M aircraft that was shot down, two weeks before the event

Incident
- Date: 24 November 2015
- Summary: Shot down by Turkish F-16 fighter jet
- Site: Syria–Turkey border

Aircraft
- Aircraft type: Sukhoi Su-24M
- Operator: Russian Air Force
- Registration: RF-90932 / 83 White
- Flight origin: Khmeimim Air Base, Syria
- Occupants: 2
- Crew: 2
- Fatalities: 1
- Survivors: 1

On 24 November 2015, a Turkish Air Force F-16 fighter jet shot down a Russian Sukhoi Su-24M attack aircraft near the Syria–Turkey border. According to Turkey, the aircraft was fired upon while in Turkish airspace because it violated the border up to a depth of 2.19 kilometres (1.36 miles) for about 17 seconds after being warned to change its heading ten times over a period of five minutes before entering the airspace. The Russian Defence Ministry denied that the aircraft ever left Syrian airspace, claiming that their satellite data showed that the Sukhoi was about 1,000 metres (1,100 yd) inside Syrian airspace when it was shot down.

The U.S. State Department said that the U.S. independently confirmed that the aircraft's flight path violated Turkish territory, and that the Turks gave multiple warnings to the pilot, to which they received no response and released audio recordings of the warnings they had broadcast. Turkish president Recep Tayyip Erdoğan pointed out that Turkey had the right to defend its airspace. Although Russian president Vladimir Putin said that the U.S. knew the flight path of the Russian jet and should have informed Turkey, two U.S. officials said that Russia had not informed the U.S. military of its jet's flight plan.

The Russian pilot and navigator both ejected from the aircraft. The navigator, Konstantin Murakhtin, was rescued, but pilot Oleg Peshkov was shot and killed by Syrian rebel ground fire while descending by parachute. A Russian marine from the search and rescue team launched to retrieve the two airmen was also killed when a rescue helicopter was targeted by the rebels.

The incident was the first destruction of a Russian or Soviet Air Forces warplane by a NATO member state since an attack on the Sui-ho Dam during the Korean War in 1953. Reactions to the incident included denunciation from Russia and an attempt to defuse the situation by NATO afterwards. Russia deployed the guided missile cruiser Moskva armed with S-300F (SA-N-6 Grumble) long-range SAM missiles off the Syrian coast near Latakia and S-400 (SA-21 Growler) mobile SAM systems to Khmeimim airbase. In response, the Turkish Armed Forces deployed the KORAL land-based radar electronic support system in Hatay Province along the Turkish–Syrian border.

== Background ==
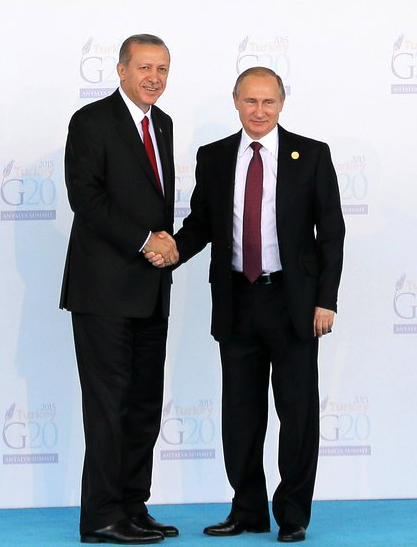
Turkish president Erdoğan (left) and Russian president Putin at the G-20 summit in Antalya on 15 November 2015

After the 2012 shooting down of a Turkish RF-4E Phantom II jet by Syrian forces, Turkish prime minister Recep Tayyip Erdoğan protested, saying that brief incursions should not trigger an attack, pointing out that Turkey did not shoot down Syrian helicopters that strayed into Turkish airspace. Nevertheless, as a response to the event he announced that Turkey changed its rules of engagement, and said it would start to consider all "military elements" approaching from Syria an enemy threat and would act accordingly. Subsequently, Turkey shot down a Syrian Mi-17 helicopter in September 2013 and a MiG-23 warplane in March 2014.

Russia was one of several countries directly involved in the Syrian conflict. On 30 September 2015, Russia began its air campaign in support of the SAA against Syrian rebels.

In early October, Turkey and NATO protested against what they saw as Russia's deliberate violations of Turkish airspace. (Note: On 15 October, Turkish jets shot down a drone operating in Turkish airspace. United States defence officials said that the drone was Russian; Russian officials denied that any of their aircraft had been shot down. On 17 October, Turkish prime minister Ahmet Davutoğlu said Turkey would shoot down any aircraft violating its airspace.) The Russian defence ministry admitted that a Russian Su-30 aircraft had entered Turkish airspace "for a few seconds" because of bad weather, adding that measures had been taken to prevent a repeat of such incidents, however Turkish radar had tracked the aircraft straying into Turkish airspace for up to 8 km (5 mi). From 3–15 October, five discussions between senior ranking officials from Turkey and Russia occurred, concerning Turkish rules of engagement and Russian violations of Turkish airspace. On 6 November 2015, six U.S. Air Force F-15C fighters were deployed by US European Command from the 48th Fighter Wing at their Lakenheath base in Britain to Incirlik Air Base as part of Operation Inherent Resolve. The government of Turkey requested these to secure the sovereignty of Turkish airspace because of earlier repeated Russian intrusions into Turkish airspace.

On 19 November, Russian ambassador to Turkey Andrei Karlov and the Russian military attaché, Colonel Andrei Victorovich Dovger, were summoned by Turkey. Russia, which was criticised by Turkey for having conducted operations near the Turkish border, a region inhabited by Syrian Turkmen and largely free of ISIL (though al-Nusra Front, the al-Qaeda affiliate in Syria, was present in the region), was notified that Turkey's rules of engagement were in place and it would react to any violations of its border security. Turkey also warned Russia that it would not be indifferent to "attacks targeting the life security of Turkmen" in the Bayırbucak area. The preceding week Turkey had called for the UN Security Council to discuss attacks against Turkish-backed Turkmens. Approximately 1,700 people had fled the area in the previous three days due to battles between Syrian government forces and anti-government Syrian Turkmen and al-Nusra Front fighters. Russia had bombed the area near the Turkish border to support Syrian government forces. Syrian Turkmen formed their own armed brigades called Syrian Turkmen Brigades in opposition to the Syrian government of President Bashar al-Assad, loosely affiliated with other rebels such as the Free Syrian Army. The Turkmen brigades also cooperated with al-Qaeda's Syrian affiliate the al-Nusra Front and with the Salafi coalition known as Ahrar al-Sham. In Latakia, the Turkish-supported rebels formed the Jabal al-Turkman Brigade.

== The shootdown ==
Approximate flight paths according to the Turkish and Russian forces

On 24 November 2015 at 9:24 am local time (7:24 am GMT), as it was returning to Khmeimim airbase, a Russian Sukhoi Su-24 aircraft with tail number 83 white and registration number RF-90932 was shot down near the Syrian–Turkish border by a missile from a patrolling Turkish Air Force F-16 fighter jet. Later analysis suggested that a radar-guided, medium range AIM-120 AMRAAM was fired from between 14–19 kilometres (9–12 mi) away. The Economist reported that the two Su-24s were on their way to strike Syrian Turkmen targets. Syrian government forces supported by the Shiite militias and the Russian Air Force were fighting against Syrian Turkmen brigades, Army of Conquest and al-Nusra Front fighters.

Early reports from Russian news agencies, citing the Russian Defence Ministry, indicated that the aircraft had been downed by a ground-based strike from Syrian Turkmen rebels, but they later confirmed Turkish reports that the aircraft had been shot down by Turkish fighter jets. The Turkish military released a graphic of the Russian aircraft's flight pattern, which shows it crossing the southern tip of Hatay Province before being shot down and crashing near Turkmen Mountain. Russia then countered Turkey's radar trace analysis by publishing a different flight map showing no airspace violation. Three days later, on 27 November, Russia published another map.

According to Turkey's statement to the UN Security Council, two aircraft, whose nationalities were unknown at the time, violated Turkish airspace up to a depth of 2.19 km (1.36 mi) for about 17 seconds. According to Turkish officials, the aircraft were given 10 warnings within the span of 5 minutes, by operators at a ground-controlled interception station, to change their course. Turkey later released the audio recording ("The unknown air traffic position to Humaymim 020 radial 26 miles. This is Turkish Air Force speaking on Guard. You are approaching Turkish airspace, change your heading south immediately"). The Russians claim there were no warnings. Analysts have noted that Turkey's warnings were issued on a dedicated mutually-agreed radio channel, which was the international Guard (emergency) channel (243.0 MHz), but the R-862M radio fitted to the Su-24M is not able to monitor this channel without optional equipment, which may not have been installed. According to Turkey, one aircraft left Turkish national airspace after violating it; the other aircraft was fired upon by Turkish F-16s patrolling the area and crashed into Syrian territory after being hit in Turkish airspace. Based on its heat signature, an anonymous American official stated that the jet was hit in Syrian airspace after a short incursion into Turkey. On 30 November, US ambassador to NATO Douglas Lute stated that the data supported the Turkish version of events.

According to the Russian Defence Ministry, the Su-24 was downed from an altitude of 6,000 metres (20,000 ft) within one kilometre of the Turkish border and in Syrian airspace, while returning to the Khmeimim airbase in Syria. Russia has maintained that the aircraft never left Syrian territory. The Russian Defence Ministry confirmed the aircraft was an Su-24 but said that it had proof the jet was within Syrian airspace. According to the commander-in-chief of the Russian Aerospace Forces, Viktor Bondarev, a Turkish F-16 entered Syria's airspace for 40 seconds and flew 2 km (1.2 mi) inside Syrian territory, and the Russian warplane did not violate the Turkish border.

== Casualties ==
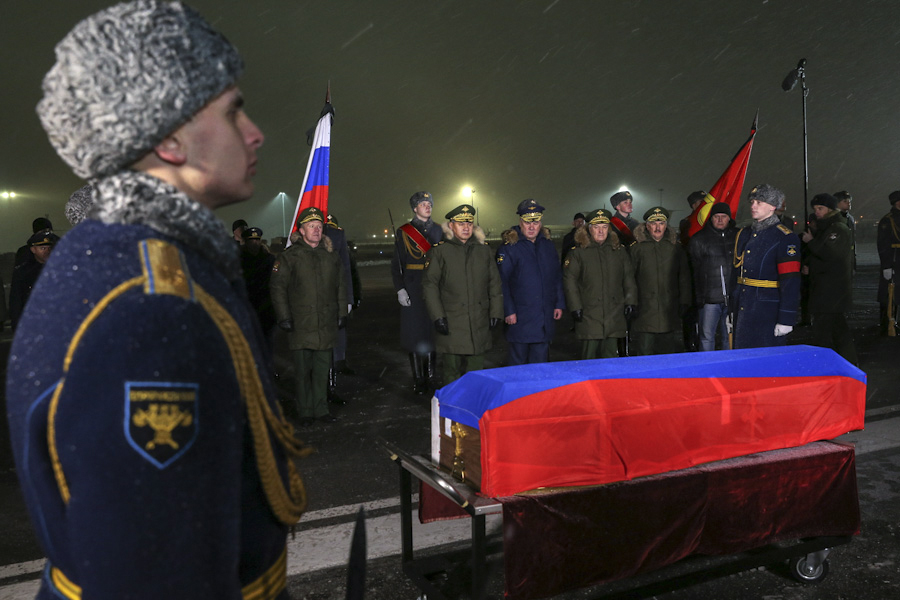
Repatriation of Oleg Peshkov's body at Chkalovsky Airport, 30 November 2015

Both pilots ejected after the aircraft was hit. Initially, the deputy commander of a Turkmen Syrian opposition rebel brigade in Syria, Alparslan Çelik (a Turkish citizen and member of the Grey Wolves ultra-nationalist group), claimed his forces had shot dead the two pilots as they descended with parachutes, and in a film a person could be heard in the background repeatedly shouting "Stop shooting!" in Turkish as the parachutists descended. A Turkish official reported that he believed both were alive. It was also reported that one of the pilots had been captured by the Turkmen fighters and a video was circulated which allegedly showed the pilot's body.

Russia's military general staff spokesman Lieutenant General Sergei Rudskoi confirmed that one pilot, Lieutenant Colonel Oleg Anatolyevich Peshkov, was killed by ground fire; the weapons systems operator was rescued.

The shooting of an ejecting aircraft pilot is in contravention of Article 42 of the 1977 Protocol I of the Geneva Conventions, yet, Protocol I applies only to interstate armed conflict (i.e., fighting between opposing states) and no international humanitarian law prohibited such practice in a non-interstate conflict (i.e., fighting between state forces and non-state armed groups). In other words, while shooting down the Russian Sukhoi Su-24 by Turkey fell under the context of interstate conflict, the killing of the parachuting pilot was caused by a non-state armed group and therefore fell under the context of non-interstate conflict.

The pilot of the Su-24, Oleg Peshkov, 45, was posthumously awarded the Hero of the Russian Federation, the country's highest military honour; the surviving weapons systems officer, Konstantin Murakhtin, and the deceased rescuer, Alexander Pozynich, 29, received the Order of Courage. On 2 December Peshkov was buried with full military honours in the Alley of Heroes of the cemetery in Lipetsk with about 10,000 people attending.

=== Search and rescue ===
The Turkish state-owned Anadolu Agency showed video footage of the aircraft crashing and the two pilots parachuting down. Russian helicopters conducted low-altitude combat search and rescue flights in the area to look for the pilot.

Two Mil Mi-8 helicopters were sent to find and recover the pilots from the crash site. One of the helicopters was damaged by small-arms fire from Syrian Turkmen Brigade militants, resulting in the death of a naval infantryman, and was forced to make an emergency landing. All the surviving crew of the helicopter were later rescued and evacuated. The Free Syrian Army's 1st Coastal Division claimed that they subsequently destroyed the abandoned helicopter using a US-made BGM-71 TOW missile.

As the Russian Armed Forces began planning an operation to extract the pilot, the Iranian General Qasem Soleimani contacted them and proposed a joint rescue operation under his supervision. The rescue team which General Soleimani put forth consisted of eight Hezbollah special forces personnel and 18 Syrian commandos, who were trained by Iran and had firsthand knowledge of the geography of the area, with Russia providing transport, logistical support, air cover and satellite intelligence. One of the pilots, Oleg Peshkov, had been wounded and then killed by rebels after parachuting from the plane, while the other one, Konstantin Murahtin, escaped and was rescued. During the rescue mission a Russian Marine, Alexandr Pozynich, had been fatally wounded. The rescue team returned to base safely and handed over the pilot to the Syrian Army. Vladimir Putin was reportedly closely following the operation. The body of the dead pilot was flown to Turkey and Russian officials in Ankara arranged for its repatriation to Moscow.

== Aftermath ==
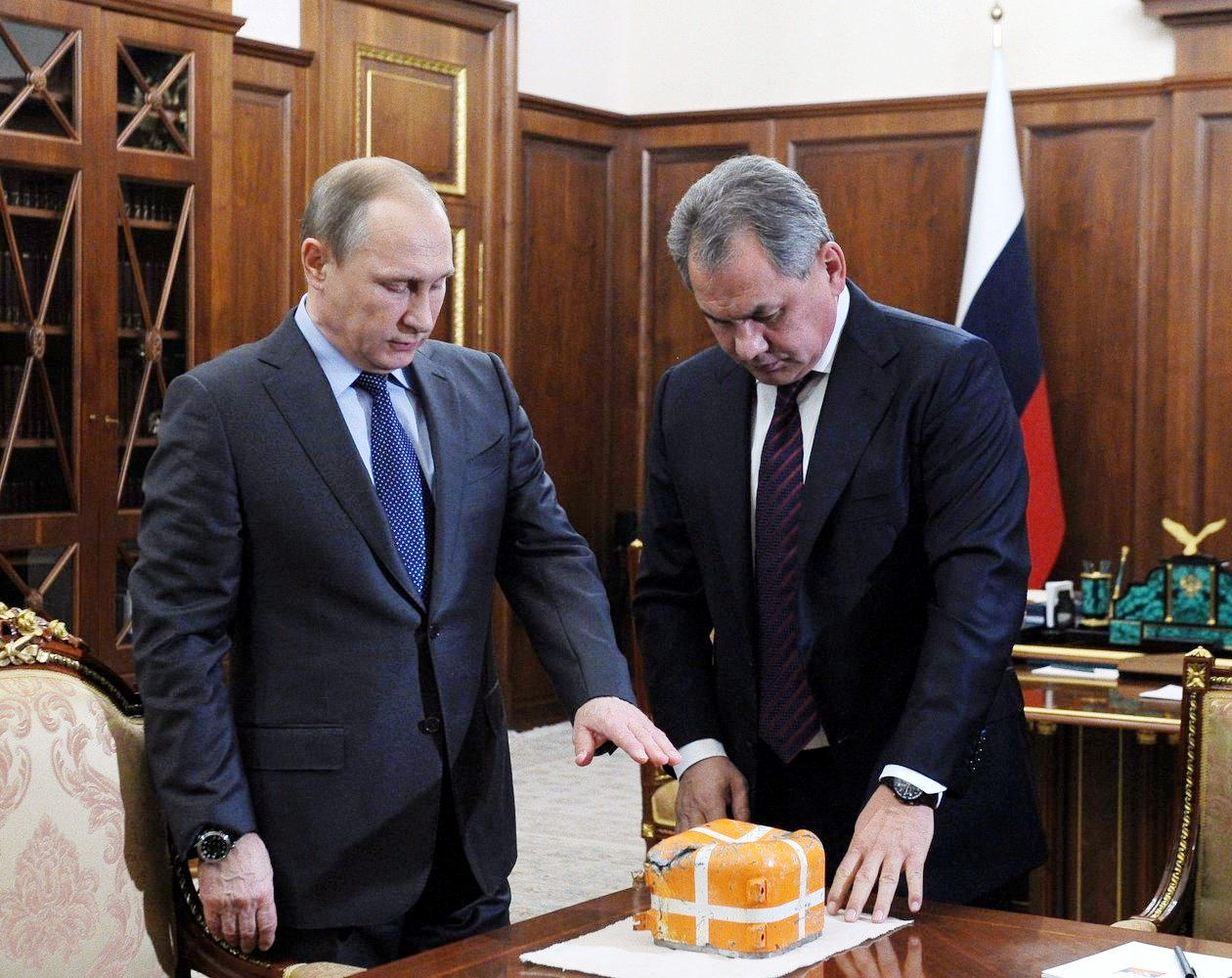
Russian Defence Minister Sergei Shoigu presents President Putin with the flight data recorder of the Su-24.

On 25 November, the foreign ministers of Russia and Turkey spoke for an hour by telephone, and both governments stated that day that they would not initiate a war as a result of the incident. Russian foreign minister Sergey Lavrov told journalists that his country would "seriously reevaluate" its relationship with Turkey. The Russian Defence Ministry broke off military contacts with the Turkish Armed Forces and Russian defence officials said that future airstrikes in Syria would be escorted by fighters. According to the Russian Minister of Defence Sergei Shoigu, Russia would deploy S-400 surface-to-air missile systems to Khmeimim airbase in Syria, where the Russian Aerospace Forces group was stationed.

== Reactions ==
=== Involved parties ===
A few hours after the incident, Russian president Vladimir Putin spoke from Sochi, where he was meeting with King Abdullah II of Jordan, saying that it was a "stab in the back by terrorist accomplices", that Russia would not put up with attacks like this one and that Russia–Turkey relations would be affected. Foreign Minister Sergey Lavrov was due to visit Turkey the next day, and Turkish president Recep Tayyip Erdoğan had scheduled a visit to Russia later in the year. Lavrov cancelled his trip after the incident. Lieutenant General Sergey Rudskoi said that forces threatening Russia would be targeted. Protesters pelted the Turkish embassy in Russia with eggs before police cleared the area. On 26 November, Prime Minister Dmitry Medvedev announced broad economic sanctions against Turkey that would affect their joint investment projects, including the possible shelving of a multibillion-dollar deal to build Turkish Stream gas pipeline through Turkey. Chechen leader Ramzan Kadyrov said that Turkey would regret its actions. Putin accused Turkey of helping ISIL in the illegal oil trade, saying that funds from the sale of oil were used to support terrorists. The Russian Air Force had recently started bombing the oil tankers en route to other countries, including Turkey, and the infrastructure for processing and storage of crude oil. Putin later claimed that the Turkish shoot-down was an "ambush" that had been prepared in advance. A bill making denial of the Armenian genocide illegal has been introduced in the Russian State Duma.

Syrian Information Minister Omran al-Zoubi said the shooting would be added to the criminal record of insurgent groups fighting in the country and of those countries that were financing and arming them; he mentioned Turkey, Saudi Arabia and Qatar as the strongest such backers.

Erdoğan pointed out that Turkey had the right to defend its airspace. He said worse incidents have not taken place in the past because of Turkey's restraint. He also stressed that Turkey's actions were fully in line with the new rules of engagement adopted after Syria shot down a Turkish jet in 2012. Turkish prime minister Ahmet Davutoğlu defended the action saying Turkey has the right to defend itself against border violations, but that it did not amount to an aggression against any foreign territory and the country called for NATO to hold an extraordinary meeting later in the day. He further called for working towards solving the crisis in Syria. Davutoğlu also said that attacks on Turkmen could not be legitimised under the justification of attacking ISIL. Turkey's ambassador to the United States, Serdar Kilic, asked for Turkey's warnings to be taken seriously. Davutoglu said Turkey would cooperate but did not offer an apology. Dozens of protesters were reported outside the Russian consulate in Istanbul demonstrating against Russian military operations in the Turkmen-populated areas of Syria. Russian president Putin issued a decree within hours of Turkey's statement which placed a ban on trade of some goods, forbade extensions of labour contracts for Turks working in Russia as of 1 January 2016, ended chartered flights from Russia to Turkey, disallowed Russian tourism companies from selling holiday packages with a stay in Turkey, and called for ending visa-free travel between Russia and Turkey, while ordering tighter control over Turkish air carriers in Russia, using security as a justification.

Russia started bombarding rebels – including Turkmen insurgents – in Latakia, ignoring demands made by Turkey over the previous week to end its military operations close to the Turkish border. A Turkmen commander said missiles fired from Russian warships in the Mediterranean were also hitting the area. Russian Defence Ministry spokesman Igor Konashenkov said that as soon as the pilot was rescued the groups responsible for the attack had been killed by Russian bombing and Syrian government rocket artillery. A Turkish supply convoy, reportedly carrying small arms, machine-guns and ammunition, was bombed by what is believed to have been Russian airstrikes in the northwestern town of Azaz, in north-western Syria. Claimed as an aid convoy by the Turks, no organization has as yet confirmed that the convoy belonged to them. At least seven people died and ten people were injured as around 20 trucks went up in flames. Turkish state-run Anadolu Agency accused Russia of supporting the Kurdish YPG, PYD and Syrian Democratic Forces.

On 25 November – the day after the jet was shot down, a Russian lawmaker, Sergei Mironov, introduced a bill to the Russian parliament that would criminalize the denial of the Armenian genocide, a political move that Turkey has strongly opposed when countries like France and Greece adopted similar laws.

On 26 November, Russia deployed the guided missile cruiser Moskva armed with S-300F (SA-N-6 Grumble) long-range SAM missiles positioned off Latakia, off the Syrian coast and S-400 (SA-21 Growler) mobile SAM systems to Khmeimim airbase. The Russian military warned it would shoot down any aerial target that posed a threat to its planes.

On 26 November, the Russian Ministry of Defence broke off contact with the Turkish military. All existing channels of communication between the two sides have been shut down, the ministry said.

On 27 November, Russia announced that it had also suspended its participation in joint Black Sea naval drills indefinitely. The Russian navy's envoy in charge of coordinating the actions of Russia's Black Sea Fleet with the Turkish navy has reportedly been recalled. On 27 November, Russian foreign minister Sergey Lavrov announced that Moscow will halt the existing visa-free regime starting on 1 January, saying that Turkey has become a conduit for terrorists and has been reluctant to share information with Moscow about Russian citizens accused of involvement in terrorist activities. On 28 November, Russian president Vladimir Putin signed a decree imposing economic sanctions against Turkey. The decree, which came into force immediately, banned charter flights from Russia to Turkey, prevented tour firms selling holidays there, and outlawed some Turkish imports, and halted or curbed the economic activities of Turkish firms and nationals. On 2 December, Russian Deputy Defence Minister Anatoly Antonov said in a media briefing with foreign journalists that Turkey was the biggest buyer of "stolen" oil from Syria and Iraq and accused the family of Turkish president Recep Tayyip Erdoğan of being directly involved in the trade of petroleum with the Islamic State group. On 3 December, Putin referred to the incident during his annual state of the nation speech.

At his annual press conference on 17 December 2015, when asked about a third-party involvement in the current Russian-Turkish relations deteriorated by the shootdown of Russian Su-24, Vladimir Putin remarked "...if someone in the Turkish government decided to lick the Americans in a certain place, well I don't know then, was that the right decision or not?".

On 23 December, Selahattin Demirtaş, co-leader of Turkey's pro-Kurdish Peoples' Democratic Party (HDP), criticized Ankara's stance regarding a Russian jet shot down by Turkey.

On 27 December, the Turkish newspaper Hurriyet published an interview with Alparslan Çelik who spoke about the downing. TASS reported that the Turkish militant had fought in Syria for two years. The Russian foreign ministry expressed surprise and indignation that a major Turkish newspaper had given floor to the "murderer and terrorist... filled with hatred towards Russia and the Russian people." On 30 December, the Russian foreign ministry called for Ankara to arrest Çelik.

In June 2016, Turkish president Recep Tayyip Erdoğan sent a letter, on the recommendation of Farkhad Akhmedov to Russian president Vladimir Putin expressing sympathy and 'deep condolences' to the family of the victims. An investigation was also reopened into the suspected Turkish military personnel involved in the incident. Three weeks later (in the meantime, there had been a coup d'état attempt against him), Erdoğan announced in an interview that the two Turkish pilots who downed Russian aircraft were arrested on suspicion that they have links to the Gülen movement, and that a court should find out "the truth". By doing so, Turkish government aimed to cast aspersions on the movement, a conspiracy theory implying that the organization was behind all the troubles Turkey was facing.

=== International organizations ===
- European Union: President of the European Council Donald Tusk called upon Turkey and Russia to stay calm; he was supported by the High Representative of the European Union for Foreign Affairs Federica Mogherini, following her meeting with Secretary General of NATO Jens Stoltenberg, who urged both parties to avoid escalation.
- NATO: Secretary General of NATO Jens Stoltenberg backed Turkey's assessment of the engagement, offered solidarity with Turkey, and called for both sides to de-escalate the situation.

=== Countries ===
- Armenia: Defence Minister Seyran Ohanian said it was a blow to efforts to fight terrorism.
- Australia: Foreign Minister Julie Bishop said that it was important the incident did not lead to an escalation of conflict "in a highly charged regional situation".
- Azerbaijan: President Ilham Aliyev said that Azerbaijan was ready to make efforts to reduce and eliminate tension in Turkish-Russian relations.
- Cyprus: The office of President Nicos Anastasiades stated that the shootdown would undermine efforts to fight terrorism.
- Czech Republic: President Miloš Zeman said Turkey's attack on the jet again fuels previously-raised suspicions that Ankara is supporting the terrorists in Syria. Prime Minister Bohuslav Sobotka and Foreign Minister Lubomír Zaorálek called for better co-ordination among those fighting in the region.
- France: President François Hollande called the plane incident "a serious one" and said that Turkey is providing information to NATO to investigate the circumstances. He also called for the prevention of any escalation of the situation.
- Georgia: Defence Minister Tinatin Khidasheli said that Turkey has every right to respond to airspace violations by Russia. She said that Russia had deliberately violated the airspace of NATO and EU member states in recent months, despite repeated warnings. She also noted that Turkey is an important and respected partner and player in today's world.
- Germany: Chancellor Angela Merkel said that countries have the right to defend their airspace, but the event took place against a context of tension, and that she had spoken to the Turkish prime minister in an effort to promote calm. German Vice-Chancellor Sigmar Gabriel called Turkish actions unpredictable. Foreign Minister Frank-Walter Steinmeier called for "prudence and common sense" in response to the incident and that Syria peace talks in Vienna should not be derailed.
- Greece: Greek Foreign Minister Nikos Kotzias expressed solidarity with Russia in a phone conversation with his Russian counterpart Sergey Lavrov. Greeks, also stated that Turkey violated Greek airspace almost daily.
- Iran: President Rouhani said the governments of Russia and Turkey should investigate the circumstances and avoid repetition. Mohammad Javad Zarif, Iranian Foreign Minister, said the recent escalation of tensions between the two nations over Turkey's downing of a Russian jet can be settled through mutual discretion and prudence. General Yahya Rahim Safavi, a revolutionary guards adviser to the Supreme Leader of Iran, said Turkey had committed a "tactical mistake".
- Iraq: Vice President Nouri al-Maliki accused Turkey of hypocrisy, saying that "Turkey's planes violate Iraqi and Syrian airspace every day".
- Kazakhstan: Kazakhstan Foreign Ministry urged both countries to show restraint. President Nazarbayev said that the plane was in a war against terrorists.
- Latvia: Minister of Defence Raimonds Bergmanis told LNT that NATO allies are united with Turkey, who had the right to protect its airspace. He added that there is much evidence regarding breaches of Turkish airspace carried out by Russian military aircraft.
- Lithuania: Foreign Minister Linas Linkevičius supported Turkey's right to defend itself.
- Pakistan: A few days later, the Foreign Office expressed concerns about the ongoing tensions between Turkey and Russia and recommended that the two countries should negotiate.
- Serbia: President Tomislav Nikolić said that the incident was the fault of Turkey and that Turkey often violated Greek and Syrian airspace adding that "now one can hardly expect aid from Turkey in the fight against terrorism".
- Ukraine: National Security and Defence Council Secretary Oleksandr Turchynov said that the Turkish Air Force acted professionally as any civilised country should operate when its sovereign space is violated by another state's warplane. He added that Ukraine should shoot down Russian jets if they violate Ukraine's airspace too.
- United Kingdom: Foreign Secretary Philip Hammond said the incident was potentially serious but also said that Turkey was an important ally of the United Kingdom and European Union. When asked by opposition Labour MP Dennis Skinner whether Turkey could still be considered an ally, Hammond said that Turkey is an important NATO ally in the context of the fight against ISIL and the migration crisis.
- United States: President Barack Obama assured his Turkish counterpart, Recep Tayyip Erdoğan, in a phone call, of support for his country's right to defend its sovereignty and that it was important to find out exactly what had happened and to prevent escalation. Department of State Spokesperson Mark Toner stated that Syrian Turkmen under attack have the right to self-defence. The United States announced a list of new economic sanctions on Russian and Syrian individuals and companies.

=== Financial markets ===
The MICEX and RTS Index, and Borsa Istanbul fell over 1%. The Turkish lira also dropped following news of the shootdown, as did broader European stock markets.

== See also ==
- List of accidents and incidents involving military aircraft (2010–2019)
- 2012 Turkish F-4 Phantom shootdown
