= Mlaihat al-Atash =

Mlaihat al-Atash مليحة العطش
- Town
- Location within Syria
- Coordinates: 32°49′27″N 36°17′38″E
- PAL: 271/248
- Country: Syria
- Governorate: Daraa
- District: Izraa
- Nahiyah: Izraa

Population (2004 census)
  - Total: 3,150
- Time zone: UTC+2 (EET)
  - Summer (DST): UTC+3 (EEST)

Mlaihat al-Atash (Arabic: مليحة العطش, also spelled Melihet el-Atash, Melihet al-Hariri or Maliha al-Shamaliyya) is a town in southern Syria, part of the Daraa Governorate situated in the Hauran plain. It is located 20 kilometers (12 mi) northeast of Daraa and 22 kilometers (14 mi) northwest of Suwayda. Nearby localities include Izraa to the northwest, Buser al-Harir to the northeast, Nahtah and al-Mlaihah al-Gharbiyah to the southeast, al-Hirak to the south, as-Sawra to the southwest, Namer and Qarfa to the west.

According to the Syria Central Bureau of Statistics (CBS), Mlaihat al-Atash had a population of 3,150 in the 2004 census. Its inhabitants are predominantly Sunni Muslims.

The town was established in 1956. The entire population belongs to the Hariri tribe, present across the southern Hauran plain, mainly from its Shawali clan. As of 2013, many of its inhabitants were emigres working in the Gulf States. The town's economy is agricultural and the main crops are grains, vegetables, olives and grapes.

== History ==
In 1838, it was noted as being east of ash-Shaykh Miskin, with a Sunni Muslim population.

== Religious buildings ==
- Zayn al-Abidin Mosque
- Abu Bakr al-Siddiq Mosque

== Bibliography ==
- Robinson, E.; Smith, E. (1841). Biblical Researches in Palestine, Mount Sinai and Arabia Petraea: A Journal of Travels in the year 1838. Vol. 3. Boston: Crocker & Brewster.
