= Rakham =

Rakham رخم
- Village
- Location within Syria
- Coordinates: 32°43′13″N 36°20′37″E
- PAL: 276/236
- Country: Syria
- Governorate: Daraa
- District: Izraa
- Subdistrict: Hirak

Population (2004 census)
  - Total: 547
- Time zone: UTC+2 (EET)
  - Summer (DST): UTC+3 (EEST)

Rakham (Arabic: رخم) is a village in the Hauran plain of southern Syria, administratively part of the Daraa Governorate. According to the Syria Central Bureau of Statistics (CBS), Rakham had a population of 547 in the 2004 census. It is located 40 km northeast of Daraa.

Populated periodically since the 1st millennium BC, its inhabitants are predominantly Christian, with a Sunni Muslim minority.

Not to be mistaken for: Zawyet umm el-Rakham in Egypt, the Jabal ar Rukham mountain in Oman and the UAE, or the Ar Rukham plain in Kuwait - after which are named the nearby Sha'ib (wadi) and Dulay (hill).

== Etymology ==
Edward Robinson's 1831 work "The Biblical Repository" lists the "Rakham" as an eagle commonly found in the mountains and hills of the Hauran sanjak. The presence of this vulture or gar-eagle is widely reported in early-modern literature: by Andrew Crichton in his "History of Arabia", by Ludovico Di Varthema in his "The Travels of Ludovico Di Varthema in Egypt, Syria, Arabia Deserta and Arabia Felix, in Persia, India, and Ethiopia" (1503-1508AD), by Ernest Friedrich Carl in his "The Biblical Geography of Asia Minor, Phoenicia, and Arabia", by Johann Ludwig Burckhardt in his "Travels in Syria and the Holy Land 1822", and by The Literary Gazette and Journal of Belles Lettres, Arts, and Sciences (1822). It is therefore plausible that the modern name of the town, which was only repopulated in the 1800s after centuries of desertion, is derived from this endemic animal.

== History ==
=== Ottoman era ===
In 1596, it appeared under the name Raham in Ottoman tax registers as a village in the Nahiya of Bani Malik al-Asraf in the Hawran Qada. It had a population of 20 households and 10 bachelors, all Muslim. The villagers paid a fixed tax-rate of 40% on agricultural products, including wheat (3000 a.), barley (1800 a.), summer crops (1250 a.), goats or beehives (250 a.), in addition to "occasional revenues" (200 a,); a total of 6,500 akçe.

The journal of Edward Robinson and Eli Smith - who travelled the southern Levant in the 1830s visiting places such as Mount Sinai, Tyre, Jerusalem, Ajloun, and Gaza - mentions Rakham as an abandoned village "khirba" in the Nukrah (Batanaea) region of Hauran, marking it south of the major town of Sheikh Meskin.

=== Syrian Civil War ===
In 2013, the Assad-affiliated Brigade 52 captured the village and began using it as an outpost against the anti-government southeastern areas of the governorate. This resulted in the complete exodus of its inhabitants, both Christian and Muslim.

The abandoned village remained under the military control of the Assad government until the Daraa and As-Suwayda offensive (June 2015) when rebels took the village from Brigade 52 as they advanced towards al-Thaalah airbase. They also captured the towns of al-Meleha al-Gharbia and Sakakah, as well as the al-Koum checkpoint.

It was seized back by the Assad government in May of the 2018 Southern Syria offensive, and unlike its neighbouring towns of Al-Hirak and Al-Karak, didn't receive any reconciliation pacts but complete military subjugation. During this time, the UN High Commissioner for Human Rights Zeid bin Ra'ad al-Hussein warned of a "catastrophe" as 120,000 locals of eastern Daraa were uprooted.

In 2021, a checkpoint nearby the village belonging to the Air Force Intelligence of the Assad Regime was attacked by unknown assailants.

During the Southern Syria offensive (2024), on the 6th of December local forces seized control of Rakham and other towns in the governorate.

== Geography ==
Rakham occupies a basaltic rise about 20 m high, extending over ~100 hectares of land, not including its agricultural acreage. The hill overlooks a wadi known as the "valley of gold", which channels water from streams originating in the Jabal al-Arab towards the village.

=== Location ===
The 1926 Arabic book Hawran al-Damiyah, which extensively explores Hauran, marked Rakham as south of Sheikh Meskin, near Al-Hirak.

It is generally known to be located a half hour walk south of Al-Mlaihah, to which it belongs to administratively, and an hour and a half walk west of al-Thaalah.

=== Climate ===
Rakham has a Hot semi-arid climate (Köppen BSh). The average high and low temperature throughout the year is 25.49 and 13.52 °C (77.9 and 56.3 °F). The average precipitation is 367.6 mm (14.5 in). More than 80% of precipitation occurs between November and March, with more than 72.4% between December and March. Average humidity is 53%. Due to a heavily winter-concentrated rainfall it resembles a Csa, but the total precipitation is too low to meet Group C criteria..

Climate data for Rakham, 519.14 m (1,703.2 ft) above sea level, 1991–2020 normals
| Month | Jan | Feb | Mar | Apr | May | Jun | Jul | Aug | Sep | Oct | Nov | Dec | Year |
|---|---|---|---|---|---|---|---|---|---|---|---|---|---|
| Record high °C (°F) | 25.81 (78.46) | 28.79 (83.82) | 33.76 (92.77) | 34.75 (94.55) | 39.71 (103.48) | 41.70 (107.06) | 43.68 (110.62) | 46.66 (115.99) | 42.69 (108.84) | 39.71 (103.48) | 31.77 (89.19) | 25.81 (78.46) | 46.66 (115.99) |
| Mean daily maximum °C (°F) | 14.23 (57.61) | 16.44 (61.59) | 19.98 (67.96) | 24.47 (76.05) | 29.36 (84.85) | 32.35 (90.23) | 34.82 (94.68) | 34.88 (94.78) | 32.81 (91.06) | 28.3 (82.9) | 21.8 (71.2) | 16.4 (61.5) | 25.49 (77.88) |
| Daily mean °C (°F) | 10.91 (51.64) | 12.91 (55.24) | 16.17 (61.11) | 20.40 (68.72) | 25.43 (77.77) | 27.98 (82.36) | 30.02 (86.04) | 30.04 (86.07) | 28.37 (83.07) | 24.43 (75.97) | 18.53 (65.35) | 13.3 (55.9) | 21.54 (70.77) |
| Mean daily minimum °C (°F) | 5.29 (41.52) | 6.13 (43.03) | 16.17 (61.11) | 20.40 (68.72) | 16.28 (61.30) | 18.68 (65.62) | 20.31 (68.56) | 20.64 (69.15) | 19.34 (66.81) | 16.74 (62.13) | 12.10 (53.78) | 7.78 (46.00) | 13.52 (56.34) |
| Record low °C (°F) | −10.92 (12.34) | −0.99 (30.22) | 0.00 (32.00) | 3.97 (39.15) | 7.94 (46.29) | 11.91 (53.44) | 13.90 (57.02) | 14.89 (58.80) | 13.90 (57.02) | 10.92 (51.66) | 3.97 (39.15) | 0.99 (33.78) | −10.92 (12.34) |
| Average precipitation mm (inches) | 79.52 (3.13) | 78.27 (3.08) | 49.16 (1.94) | 32.25 (1.27) | 13.31 (0.52) | 2.02 (0.08) | 0.17 (0.01) | 0.56 (0.02) | 2.8 (0.11) | 20.77 (0.82) | 29.70 (1.17) | 59.02 (2.32) | 30.63 (1.21) |
| Average precipitation days (≥ 1.0 mm) | 10.37 | 9.11 | 7.85 | 6.05 | 3.16 | 0.64 | 0.00 | 0.18 | 0.64 | 4.61 | 6.05 | 7.67 | 4.7 |
| Average relative humidity (%) | 66 | 60 | 57 | 50 | 43 | 46 | 48 | 52 | 51 | 49 | 50 | 58 | 53 |

== Demographics ==
In 2011, the Melkite Greek Catholic Church had approximately 400 believers in the village, while most Christians adhered to the Greek Orthodox Church of Antioch.

By 2012, the village mukhtar Atiyah Salboud recorded the population at between 1500-2000, noting that it was the first time the village population had regained its historical population level from the 1960s.

== Water System ==
The most distinguishing feature is the intricate Roman east-west water system, where an aqueduct brings water from the valley of gold and supplies it to three artificial ponds, or water collection sites. The aqueduct then drops to ground level and spreads out to two more artificial ponds. Like the two wells of the village, these ponds have been used for millennia as sites of communal gatherings, cooking, and cleaning. Their names are as follows: Umm al-Shayd, Umm al-Souf, Umm al-Bayda (the largest and in the centre of the village), and Umm al-Safa.

Historically, the water stream used to continue down a tunnel into two more ponds, all three of which have been blocked recently.

This water system appears to have been common throughout the regions surrounding the Lajat, as mentioned in the American Archaeological Expedition to Syria 1899-1900; "Rain falls annually for a few weeks... it is caught and preserved by the inhabitants in ancient cisterns". Johanns book also states that "In all these villages are several reservoirs of water, for the supply of the inhabitants during summer, and which are filled either by the winter torrents descending from the Jebel Hauran, or by rain water, which is conducted into them from every side by narrow channels: they are all of ancient date, and built entirely with the black Hauran stone".

== Buildings ==
- St. George Greek Orthodox Church (This is the older of the two churches, hosting annual celebrations on the Feast of St. George (May 6). This holiday features hymns, prayers, and sheep being butchered on the entrance of the Byzantine section for the distribution of the meat to the poor)
- Saints Peter and Paul Melkite Greek Catholic Church
- Village Mosque
- Primary School

== See also ==
- Christians in Syria
- Hauran

== Bibliography ==
- Hütteroth, W.-D.; Abdulfattah, K. (1977). Historical Geography of Palestine, Transjordan and Southern Syria in the Late 16th Century. Erlanger Geographische Arbeiten, Sonderband 5. Erlangen, Germany: Vorstand der Fränkischen Geographischen Gesellschaft. ISBN 3-920405-41-2.
- Robinson, E.; Smith, E. (1841). Biblical Researches in Palestine, Mount Sinai and Arabia Petraea: A Journal of Travels in the year 1838. Vol. 3. Boston: Crocker & Brewster.
