= Mahajjah =

Mahajjah محجة
- Town
- Location within Syria
- Coordinates: 32°57′21″N 36°13′17″E
- Grid position: 264/262 PAL
- Country: Syria
- Governorate: Daraa
- District: Izraa
- Nahiyah: Izraa

Population (2004 census)
  - Total: 9,982
- Time zone: UTC+2 (EET)
  - Summer (DST): UTC+3 (EEST)

Mahajjah (Arabic: محجة) is a town in the Izraa District of the Daraa Governorate in southern Syria located north of Daraa. It is situated about 63 kilometers south of the capital Damascus. Nearby localities include Khabab to the northeast, Tubna to the north, Inkhil to the northwest, Jasim to the west, Nawa to the southwest, Izraa and ash-Shaykh Miskin to the south and the volcanic Lejat plain to the east. According to the Syria Central Bureau of Statistics (CBS), Mahajjah had a population of 9,982 in the 2004 census. Its inhabitants are predominantly Sunni Muslims.

Mahajjah's principal economic activity is agriculture and the population is rural. The average net income for an individual owning one hectare in the village was around LS 5,000 (US$446). Large landowners who would own 10 hectares would make an average annual income of LS 45,000 (US$4,018).

== History ==
Local Muslim tradition holds that Muhammad had sat on or leaned against a stone at Mahajjah and that the stone would ease the pain of childbirth. The 13th-century Syrian geographer Yaqut al-Hamawi dismissed the local claim, asserting that Muhammad had not traveled beyond Bosra, a town lying further south of Mahajjah. The late 12th-early 13th-century Persian traveler Ali al-Harawi noted that Mahajjah was one of the ziyarat of the Hauran plain, a site of local Muslim pilgrimage.

Al-Hamawi visited the town during Ayyubid rule, in the 1220s, noting that Mahajjah was "One of the villages of the Hauran" and that local tradition held that "seventy prophets" were buried in the town's Friday mosque. Yusuf al-Muhajji (1287-1338), a native of Mahajjah, became the Chief Qadi of the Shafi'i school of Sunni Islam in 1332, during Mamluk rule. He was dismissed from his post in 1334 and imprisoned, a move that angered the Shafi'is.

In 1596, Mahajjah appeared in the Ottoman tax registers as Muhajja and was part of the nahiya of Bani Kilab in the Hauran Sanjak. It had an entirely Muslim population consisting of 40 households and 24 bachelors. The villagers paid a fixed tax-rate of 40% on wheat, barley, summer crops, goats and beehives; a total of 28,100 akçe. All of the revenue went to a waqf (= an Islamic charitable institution).

In 1838, it was noted to be north of ash-Shaykh Miskin, with a population of Sunni Muslims and Catholics.

== Religious buildings ==
- Al-Miqdad ibn al-Aswad al-Kindi Mosque
- Al-Farooq Mosque
- Uthman ibn Affan Mosque
- Ali ibn Abi Talib Mosque
- Abu Bakr Mosque

== Bibliography ==
- Asikainen, Raisa (2007). Legitimation of Political Violence: The Cases of Hamas and the Khmer Rouge. Societas Orientalis Fennica. ISBN 978-9519380650.
- Batatu, H. (1999). Syria's Peasantry, the Descendants of Its Lesser Rural Notables, and Their Politics. Princeton University Press. ISBN 0691002541.
- Hakluyt Society (1958). Works Issued by the Hakluyt Society. The Society.
- Hütteroth, W.-D.; Abdulfattah, K. (1977). Historical Geography of Palestine, Transjordan and Southern Syria in the Late 16th Century. Erlanger Geographische Arbeiten, Sonderband 5. Erlangen, Germany: Vorstand der Fränkischen Geographischen Gesellschaft. ISBN 3-920405-41-2.
- Le Strange, G. (1890). Palestine Under the Moslems: A Description of Syria and the Holy Land from A.D. 650 to 1500. Committee of the Palestine Exploration Fund.
- Robinson, E.; Smith, E. (1841). Biblical Researches in Palestine, Mount Sinai and Arabia Petraea: A Journal of Travels in the year 1838. Vol. 3. Boston: Crocker & Brewster.
- Rodinson, M. (1980). Muhammad. Pantheon Books. ISBN 0394509080.
