= Namir =

Namir, Namr, Namer, Nimr and Nimer may refer to the following places in the Middle East, with several toponyms in southern Syria, in particular:

== Syria ==
- Namir, Shaykh Maskin, a village in the Shaykh Maskin subdistrict of the Izra District of the Daraa Governorate, in southern Syria's Hauran plain.
- Namir, Jasim, a village in the Jasim subdistrict of the Izra District of the Daraa Governorate, in southern Syria's Hauran plain. Sometimes associated with the biblical Beth Nimreh.
- Nimreh (also called 'Namara' from the same root as 'Namir'), a Druze village in the Suwayda Governorate in southern Syria's Jabal Hauran massif

== Yemen ==
- Namir, Yemen, a village in southwestern Yemen.
