= Qarfa =

Qarfa قرفــا
- Town
- Location within Syria
- Coordinates: 32°48′55″N 36°12′5″E
- Grid position: 262/247 PAL
- Country: Syria
- Governorate: Daraa
- District: Izraa
- Nahiyah: Shaykh Miskin

Population (2004 census)
  - Total: 4,885
- Time zone: UTC+2 (EET)
  - Summer (DST): UTC+3 (EEST)

Qarfa (Arabic: قرفــا) is a town in southern Syria, administratively part of the Izraa District in the Daraa Governorate. Nearby localities include ash-Shaykh Miskin to the northwest, Izraa to the northeast, Mlaihat al-Atash to the east, Namer to the southeast, Khirbet Ghazaleh to the south and Abtaa to the southwest. According to the Syria Central Bureau of Statistics (CBS), Qarfa had a population of 4,885 in the 2004 census. Its inhabitants are predominantly Sunni Muslims.

== History ==
Inside a private house in Qarfa a Greek inscription dedicating a church to Saint Bacchus was discovered. The inscription was dated to 589-590 CE and written on a stone lintel decorated with a cross.

=== Ottoman era ===
In 1596, Qarfa appeared in Ottoman tax registers as a village in the Nahiya of Bani Malik al-Asraf in the Hawran Qada. It had a population of 42 households and 15 bachelors, all Muslim. The villagers paid a fixed tax-rate of 40% on agricultural products, including wheat, barley, summer crops, and goats or beehives, a total of 6,451 akçe. 5/24 of the revenue went to a Waqf

In 1838, it was noted as a Sunni Muslim village (Kurfa) in the Nukrah district, east of ash-Shaykh Miskin.

=== Modern era ===
On 13 August 1962 a tribal feud in Qarfa between the al-Makayed and al-Manasser clans resulted in five people being wounded. The fighting was a result of old rivalries. Security forces arrested several people from the town and the wounded were evacuated to the hospital.

=== Civil War ===
During the ongoing civil war, which began in 2011, opposition rebels from the Free Syrian Army attacked a petrol station in Qarfa, resulting in the death of a relative of high-ranking government official Rustum Ghazaleh in early January 2013.

== Religious buildings ==
- The Old Mosque
- Sayyida Aisha Mosque (formerly known as the Islamic Unity Mosque)
- Abd al-Rahman ibn Awf Mosque (formerly known as the Bassel al-Assad Mosque)

== Notable people ==
- Rustum Ghazaleh (1953–2015), Head of Syrian Political Security Directorate

== Bibliography ==
- Chaniotis, A. (2003). Supplementum Epigraphicum Graecum. Vol. 50. BRILL Academic Publications. ISBN 9050634087.
- Hütteroth, W.-D.; Abdulfattah, K. (1977). Historical Geography of Palestine, Transjordan and Southern Syria in the Late 16th Century. Erlanger Geographische Arbeiten, Sonderband 5. Erlangen, Germany: Vorstand der Fränkischen Geographischen Gesellschaft. ISBN 3-920405-41-2.
- Robinson, E.; Smith, E. (1841). Biblical Researches in Palestine, Mount Sinai and Arabia Petraea: A Journal of Travels in the year 1838. Vol. 3. Boston: Crocker & Brewster.
