= Al-Mlaihah ash-Sharqiyah =

Al-Mlaihah ash-Sharqiyah المليحة الشرقية
- Town
- Location within Syria
- Coordinates: 32°45′29″N 36°21′58″E
- PAL: 241/278
- Country: Syria
- Governorate: Daraa
- District: Izraa
- Nahiyah: Hirak

Population (2004)
  - Total: 2,408
- Time zone: UTC+2 (EET)
  - Summer (DST): UTC+3 (EEST)

Al-Mlaihah ash-Sharqiyah (Arabic: المليحة الشرقية) is a town in southern Syria, administratively part of the Izraa District in the Daraa Governorate. According to the Syria Central Bureau of Statistics (CBS), Al-Mlaihah ash-Sharqiyah had a population of 2,408 in the 2004 census. Its inhabitants are predominantly Sunni Muslims.

== History ==
In 1596 it appeared in the Ottoman tax registers as Malihat az-Zaytun and was part of the nahiya of Bani Malik al-Asraf in the Hauran Sanjak. It had an entirely Muslim population consisting of 56 households and 22 bachelors. The villagers paid taxes on various agricultural products, including wheat (6000 a.), barley (900 a.), summer crops (2000 a.), goats and beehives (500 a.) in addition to "occasional revenues" (600 a.); a total of 10,000 akçe.

In 1838, it was noted as being east of ash-Shaykh Miskin, with a Sunni Muslim population.

== Religious buildings ==
- Abu Bakr al-Siddiq Mosque
- Khalid ibn al-Walid Mosque
- Salah al-Din al-Ayyubi Mosque

== Bibliography ==
- Hütteroth, W.-D.; Abdulfattah, K. (1977). Historical Geography of Palestine, Transjordan and Southern Syria in the Late 16th Century. Erlanger Geographische Arbeiten, Sonderband 5. Erlangen, Germany: Vorstand der Fränkischen Geographischen Gesellschaft. ISBN 3-920405-41-2.
- Robinson, E.; Smith, E. (1841). Biblical Researches in Palestine, Mount Sinai and Arabia Petraea: A Journal of Travels in the year 1838. Vol. 3. Boston: Crocker & Brewster.
