= Buser al-Harir =

Buser al-Harir بصّر الحرير
- Town
- Location within Syria
- Coordinates: 32°50′33″N 36°20′24″E
- Grid position: 275/250
- Country: Syria
- Governorate: Daraa
- District: Izraa
- Subdistrict: Izraa

Population (2004 census)
  - Total: 13,315
- Time zone: UTC+2 (EET)
  - Summer (DST): UTC+3 (EEST)

Buser al-Harir (Arabic: بصّر الحرير, Buṣr al-Ḥarīr, also spelled Busra al-Harir, Basr al-Harir, Busra Hariri) is a town in southern Syria, part of the Daraa Governorate situated in the Hauran plain. It is located northeast of Daraa and northwest of Suwayda. Nearby localities include Mlaihat al-Atash to the southwest, ash-Shaykh Miskin to the west, Izraa to the northwest, Harran to the northeast, Najran to the east, al-Mazraa to the southeast and Nahtah to the south. According to the Syria Central Bureau of Statistics (CBS), Buser al-Harir had a population of 13,315 in the 2004 census. Its inhabitants are predominantly Sunni Muslims.

== History ==
Buser al-Harir has been identified with the city of Bosor mentioned in 1 Maccabees (2nd century BC), where Gilead was captured by Judas Maccabeus. The town is also mentioned in the 3rd-century Mosaic of Rehob. Extensive Byzantine-era ruins were found in the town. One of the ruins was a Roman temple dedicated to an unspecified deity that was consecrated as a church by 517/18 CE. The temple was built by a certain Fl. Chrysaphios but was consecrated by archdeacon Elias, a subordinate of bishop Varus of Zorava. A notable Christian family during this era, the Maiorinus maintained their estates in Buser al-Harir. The family played an important role in the conversion of the inhabitants of the Lajat plain to Christianity. It is possible that the tomb of Elias is that of the prophet Elisha.

Buser al-Harir was visited by Muslim geographer Yaqut al-Hamawi during Ayyubid rule in the 1220s. He referred to it as "Busr" and noted that it was a "village of the Hauran" in the Lajat plain. Busr contained a shrine dedicated to the prophet Joshua (Nabi Yusha) and the tomb of Sheikh al-Hariri. According to al-Harawi, the tomb of Elias (Ilyas) was still revered in Busr. The Haririyya, a highly pantheist sect of the Rifa'iyya Sufi order, was founded in Busr in 1247 by its namesake, Ali ibn Abi'l Hasan al-Hariri al-Marwazi. The teachings of the sect were repudiated in a fatwa (Islamic edict) by the Mamluk-era scholar Ibn Taymiyya.

=== Ottoman era ===
During early Ottoman Empire rule Busra al-Harir was a large village. In 1596 it appeared in the Ottoman tax registers as "Busr" and was part of the nahiya (subdistrict) of Bani Sarma in the Hauran Sanjak. At that time it had an entirely Muslim population of 42 households and 31 bachelors, who paid fixed tax rate of 40% of various agricultural products, such as wheat, barley, summer crops, goats and beehives, a total of 17,000 akçe.

In 1838, Eli Smith noted that inhabitants were predominantly Sunni Muslims.

Towards the end of Ottoman rule in Syria, the residents of Buser al-Harir engaged in regular clashes with the residents of Jabal al-Druze. In 1879 fighting flared up between the townspeople and the Druze after the Muslim inhabitants of several nearby villages fled to Buser al-Harir as a result of fighting between the al-Atrash family, a leading Druze clan, and the local Bedouin. With pressure from the Ottoman government in Damascus, a truce was reached that year stipulating a Druze evacuation of Muslim villages in the Hauran occupied during the previous years.

By 1885 the Ottoman government had set up Buser al-Harir as one of 42 stations on the telegraph grid that extended from Aleppo in the north to Gaza in the south. In 1892 Osman Nuri Pasha, the Ottoman governor of Damascus, demanded the completion of land registration in Buser al-Harir in an attempt to extend central government control over the outlier Hauran and Transjordan regions. The town's inhabitants resisted the measure, leading to a shootout that resulted in the wounding of the district governor.

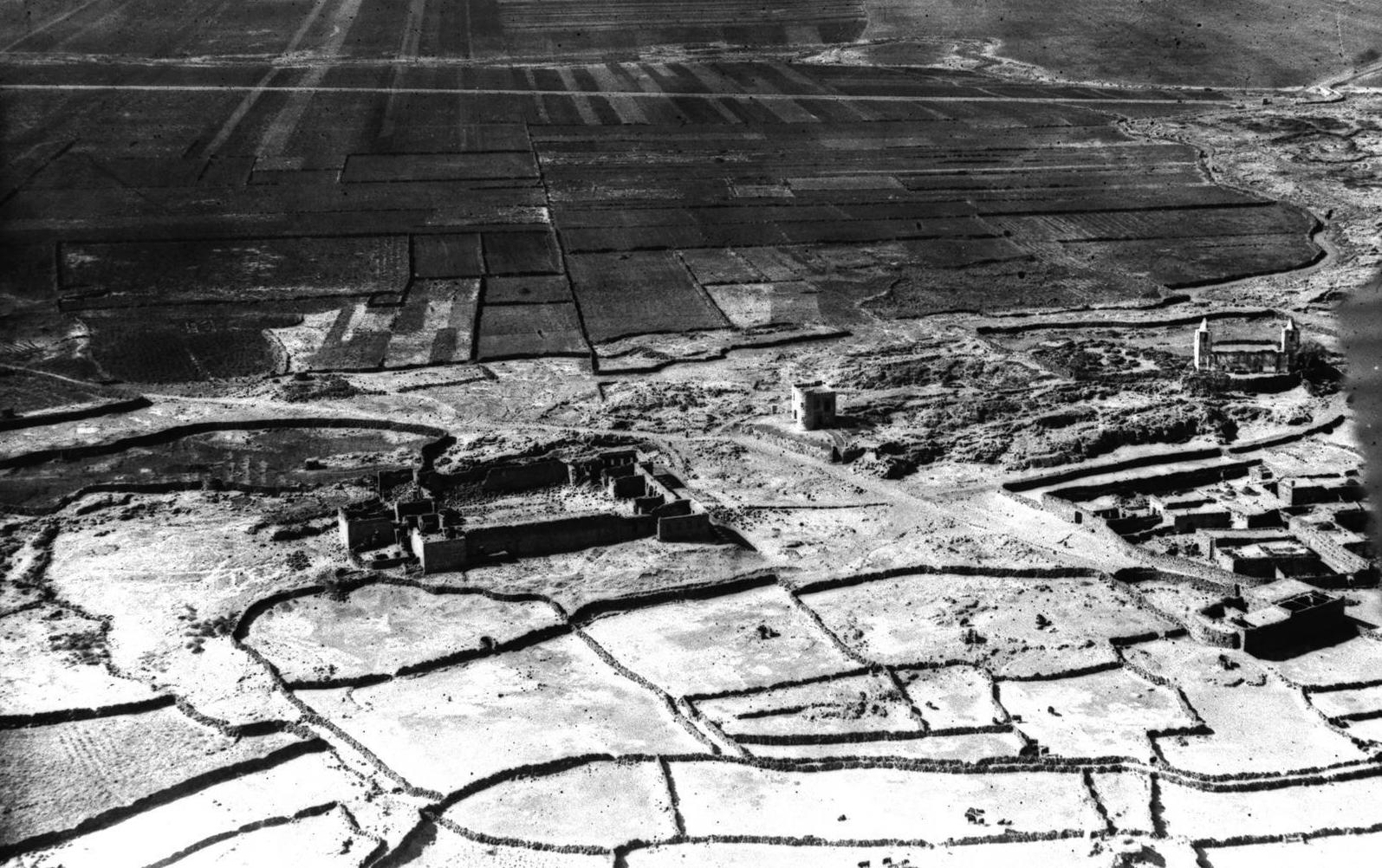
Aerial view in 1931

In May 1909 a dispute between the chief of Jabal al-Druze, Yahya "Bey" Atrash, and his business partner in a steam mill in Buser al-Harir led to armed clashes between the Druze and the town's residents. The latter were supported by the Ottoman government, which prepared a large army headed by Sami Pasha Faruqi to put down the Druze revolt in August 1910. Buser al-Harir was one of the principal garrison towns from which the Ottoman army launched its campaign. Atrash's forces were decisively defeated, with an estimated 2,000 Druze killed and hundreds of fighters imprisoned. Consequently the Ottoman government successfully began the process of extending direct rule to the Hauran.

=== Civil War ===
Buser al-Harir was reportedly "a stronghold of the rebel Free Syrian Army (FSA)" during the 2011–2012 Syrian uprising against the government of Bashar al-Assad, according to the BBC. From the town and the nearby Lajat area, the FSA attacked military supply lines. Two residents were reported killed by security forces on 10 June 2011, according to the opposition. State television reported a policeman was shot dead in the town on 16 September. On 11 December, the Syrian Army's Izra'-based 12th Armoured Brigade stormed the town in an attempt to rout out FSA fighters. According to opposition activists, two people were killed and dozens were injured after Buser al-Harir was shelled by Syrian Army tanks in April 2012. A freelance journalist for Al Jazeera and opposition activist, Mohammad al-Massalma ("al-Horani"), was killed by sniper in Busra al-Harir by security forces, according to activists. In late August 2014, the rebel battalions targeted the government-held areas in the city, while army units targeted rebel vehicles.

On 24 June 2018, the Syrian Arab Army and its elite branch, the Tiger Forces of Suheil al-Hassan, entered the city after airstrikes conducted by the Russian Air Force paved way for the assault. They captured the town on 26 June.

== Religious buildings ==
- The Old Umari Mosque (Northern)
- Al-Yasa (Elisha) Mosque
- Ubayy ibn Ka’b Mosque
- Al-Ghawazi al-Qibli Mosque

== Bibliography ==
- Freedman, D.N.; Myers, Allen C. (2000). Eerdmans Dictionary of the Bible. Amsterdam University Press. ISBN 9053565035.
- Firro, Kais (1992). A History of the Druzes. Vol. 1. BRILL. ISBN 9004094377.
- Gibb, H.A.R. (1982). The Encyclopaedia of Islam. Vol. 1. BRILL Archive. ISBN 9004064710. Part 1-2.
- Hütteroth, W.-D.; Abdulfattah, K. (1977). Historical Geography of Palestine, Transjordan and Southern Syria in the Late 16th Century. Erlanger Geographische Arbeiten, Sonderband 5. Erlangen, Germany: Vorstand der Fränkischen Geographischen Gesellschaft. ISBN 3-920405-41-2.
- Le Strange, G. (1890). Palestine Under the Moslems: A Description of Syria and the Holy Land from A.D. 650 to 1500. Committee of the Palestine Exploration Fund.
- Massignon, L. (1971). "Ḥarirīyya". In Lewis, B.; Ménage, V. L.; Pellat, Ch. & Schacht, J. (eds.). The Encyclopaedia of Islam, Second Edition. Volume III: H–Iram. Leiden: E. J. Brill. p. 222. OCLC 495469525.
- Nicolle, D. (1994). Yarmuk AD 636: The Muslim conquest of Syria. Osprey Publishing. ISBN 1855324148.
- Porter, J.L. (1858). A Handbook for Travellers in Syria and Palestine. Vol. 1. Murray.
- Robinson, E.; Smith, E. (1841). Biblical Researches in Palestine, Mount Sinai and Arabia Petraea: A Journal of Travels in the year 1838. Vol. 3. Boston: Crocker & Brewster.
- Trombley, Frank R. (1994). Hellenic Religion and Christianization: C. 370-529. BRILL. ISBN 9004096914.
- Wright, W. (1895). An Account of Palmyra and Zenobia: with Travels and Adventures in Bashan and the Desert. T. Nelson and Sons.
