= Al-Jubayliyah =

Al-Jubayliyah الجبيلية
- Village
- Location within Syria
- Coordinates: 32°54′05″N 35°56′59″E
- PAL: 239/256
- Country: Syria
- Governorate: Daraa
- District: Izraa
- Subdistrict: Nawa

Population (2004)
  - Total: 1,330
- Time zone: UTC+2 (EET)
  - Summer (DST): UTC+3 (EEST)

Al-Jubayliyah (Arabic: الجبيلية) is a village in southern Syria, administratively part of the Izraa District in the Daraa Governorate. According to the Syria Central Bureau of Statistics (CBS), al-Jubayliyah had a population of 1,330 in the 2004 census. Its inhabitants are predominantly Sunni Muslims.

== Religious buildings ==
- Mosque
