= Ruwaisat =

Ruwaisat رويسات
- Village
- Location in Syria
- Coordinates: 32°58′31″N 36°18′45″E
- PAL: 273/265
- Country: Syria
- Governorate: Daraa
- District: Izraa
- Subdistrict: Izraa

Population (2004 census)
  - Total: 117

Ruwaisat (Arabic: رويسات) is a village in southern Syria, administratively part of the Izraa District in the Daraa Governorate. According to the Syria Central Bureau of Statistics (CBS), Ruwaisat had a population of 117 in the 2004 census. Its inhabitants are predominantly Sunni Muslims.
