= Al-Warad =

Al-Warad الوراد
- Village
- Country: Syria
- Governorate: Daraa
- District: Izraa
- Subdistrict: Izraa

Population (2004 census)
  - Total: 250

Al-Warad (Arabic: الوراد) is a village in southern Syria, administratively part of the Izraa District in the Daraa Governorate. According to the Syria Central Bureau of Statistics (CBS), Al-Warad had a population of 250 in the 2004 census. Its inhabitants are predominantly Sunni Muslims.

== Religious buildings ==
- Ali ibn Abi Talib Mosque
