= Shaher Jabr Omran =

Syrian security official

Brigadier General Shaher Jabr Omran
- شاهر جبر عمران

Commander of Internal Security in Daraa
- In office 25 May 2025 – 5 November 2025
- President: Ahmed al-Sharaa
- Minister: Anas Khattab
- Succeeded by: Mohammed Ibrahim al-Sukhni

Director of the Daraa Security Directorate
- In office 31 March 2025 – 25 May 2025
- President: Ahmed al-Sharaa

Personal details
- Born: Al-Qenniyah, Daraa, Syria
- Nickname(s): Abu al-Baraa (أبو البراء); Abu Qasim 105 (أبو قاسم 105)
- Military career
- Allegiance: Al-Nusra Front (?–‍2016); Jabhat Fateh al-Sham (2016–‍2017); Hay'at Tahrir al-Sham (2017–‍2025); Syria (since 2024)
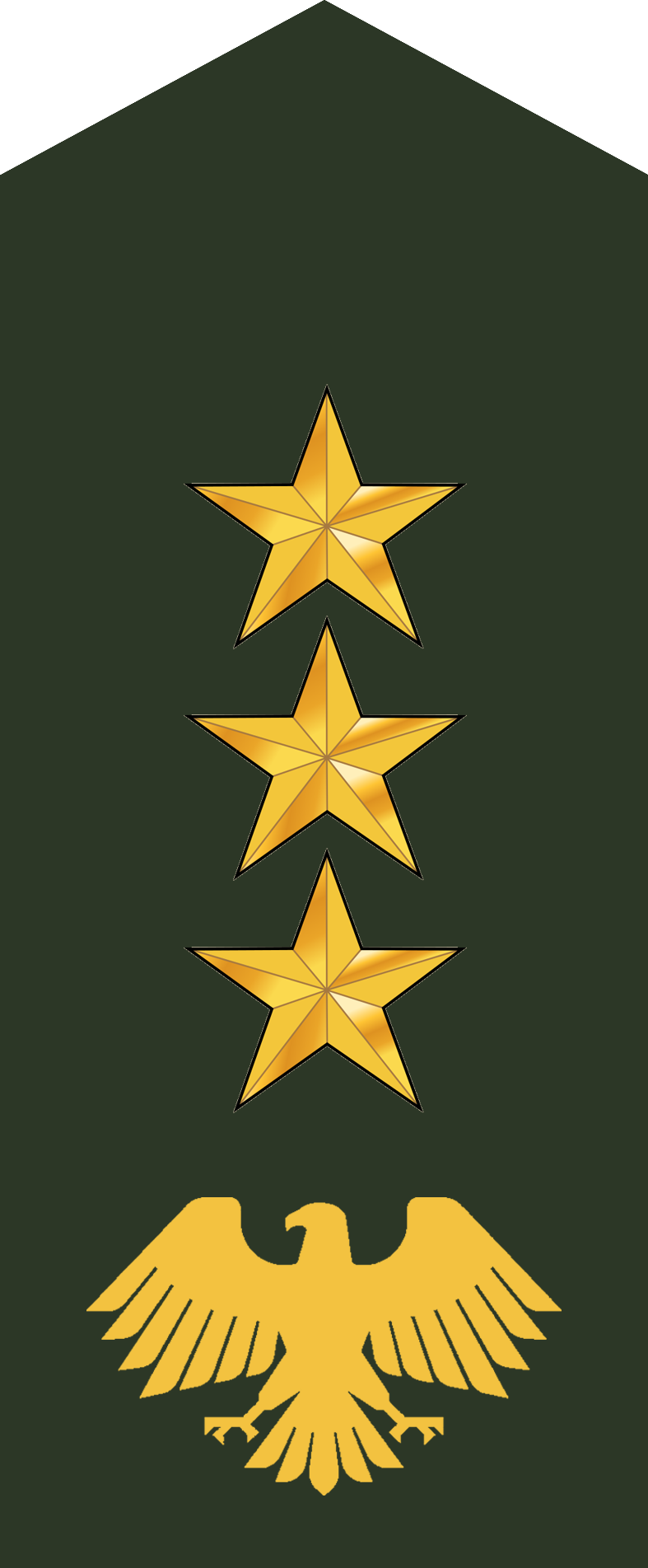
- Rank: Brigadier General
- Conflicts: Syrian civil war; Daraa Governorate campaign; 2018 Southern Syria offensive

Shaher Jabr Omran (Arabic: شاهر جبر عمران) is a Syrian security official who served as commander of Internal Security in Daraa Governorate from 25 May to 5 November 2025.

== Early life ==
He was born Al-Qenniyah, Daraa.

He was arrested by the Assad regime in 2006 and was transferred between security branches and Sednaya Prison. He was released in 2011, following the start of the Syrian revolution.

== Role during the Syrian civil war ==
He joined the Syrian opposition and participated in fighting in Damascus and then in Daraa. He then joined the Al-Nusra Front, and was appointed as a security official in southern Syria within the group in 2014.

After he was deported to opposition-held territories in Idlib Governorate following the 2018 Southern Syria offensive, he worked in the Central Control and Inspection Department within the General Security Directorate of Hay'at Tahrir al-Sham. In 2019, he established and managed the Central Information Branch within the General Security Directorate.

In 2022, he was tasked with managing infiltration operations against the Syrian government in Daraa, Suwayda, and Quneitra Governorates.

Prior to the fall of the Assad regime, he was also known by the noms de guerre Abu al-Baraa and Abu Qasim 105.

== Post-Assad ==
On 29 January 2025, Omran attended the Syrian Revolution Victory Conference and delivered a speech.

By 31 March 2025, he held the rank of brigadier general and position of security director of Daraa Governorate.

On 25 May 2025, he was appointed Internal Security commander of Daraa Governorate, as part of a broader organizational restructuring by the Syrian Ministry of Interior.

On 5 November 2025, he was transferred to the General Intelligence Service and was succeeded by Mohammed Ibrahim al-Sukhni.
