= Muawiya, Daraa =

Muawiya معاوية Mu'awiya
- Village
- Location in Syria
- Coordinates: 32°52′03″N 36°15′49″E
- Country: Syria
- Governorate: Daraa
- District: Izraa
- Subdistrict: Izraa

Population (2004 census)
  - Total: 313

Muawiya (Arabic: معاوية) is a village in southern Syria, administratively part of the Izraa District in the Daraa Governorate. According to the Syria Central Bureau of Statistics (CBS), Muawiya had a population of 313 in the 2004 census. Its inhabitants are predominantly Sunni Muslims.
