= Al-Matallah =

Al-Matallah المطلة
- Village
- Location in Syria
- Coordinates: 32°59′25″N 36°19′30″E
- PAL: 274/266
- Country: Syria
- Governorate: Daraa
- District: Izraa
- Subdistrict: Izraa

Population (2004 census)
  - Total: 565

Al-Matallah (Arabic: المطلة) is a village in southern Syria, administratively part of the Izraa District in the Daraa Governorate. According to the Syria Central Bureau of Statistics (CBS), al-Matallah had a population of 565 in the 2004 census. Its inhabitants are predominantly Sunni Muslims.

== Religious buildings ==
- Mosque
