= Al-Malzoumah =

Al-Malzoumah الملزومة
- Village
- Location in Syria
- Coordinates: 32°54′40″N 36°14′35″E
- PAL: 266/257
- Country: Syria
- Governorate: Daraa
- District: Izraa
- Subdistrict: Izraa

Population (2004 census)
  - Total: 514

Al-Malzoumah (Arabic: الملزومة) is a village in southern Syria, administratively part of the Izraa District in the Daraa Governorate. According to the Syria Central Bureau of Statistics (CBS), Al-Malzoumah had a population of 514 in the 2004 census. Its inhabitants are predominantly Sunni Muslims.

== Religious buildings ==
- Mosque
