= An-Nasiriyah, Daraa =

An-Nasiriyah الناصرية
- Village
- Location within Syria
- Coordinates: 32°56′17″N 35°57′25″E
- PAL: 240/260
- Country: Syria
- Governorate: Daraa
- District: Izraa
- Subdistrict: Nawa

Population (2004)
  - Total: 2,175
- Time zone: UTC+2 (EET)
  - Summer (DST): UTC+3 (EEST)

An-Nasiriyah (Arabic: الناصرية) is a village in southern Syria, administratively part of the Izraa District in the Daraa Governorate. According to the Syria Central Bureau of Statistics (CBS), an-Nasiriyah had a population of 2,175 in the 2004 census. Its inhabitants are predominantly Sunni Muslims.

== Religious buildings ==
- Mosque
