= Namer, Daraa =

Namer نامر
- Village
- Location within Syria
- Coordinates: 32°47′41″N 36°13′8″E
- Grid position: 264/245 PAL
- Country: Syria
- Governorate: Daraa
- District: Izraa
- Subdistrict: Shaykh Miskin

Population (2004 census)
  - Total: 2,507
- Time zone: UTC+2 (EET)
  - Summer (DST): UTC+3 (EEST)

Namer (Arabic: نامر, romanized: Nāmer), also known as Namer al-Hawa, is a village in southern Syria, administratively part of the Izraa District in the Daraa Governorate. According to the Syria Central Bureau of Statistics (CBS), Namer had a population of 2,507 in the 2004 census. Its inhabitants are predominantly Sunni Muslims, while Christians constitute a large minority.

== Geography ==
Namer is situated at an elevation of 580 meters (1,900 ft) above sea level. It is south of the district capital of Izraa, southeast of the subdistrict capital ash-Shaykh Miskin, northeast of the governorate capital of Daraa, north of Khirbet Ghazaleh, and northwest of al-Hirak. The area in which Namer lies is characterized by its rich soils and moderate rainfall, historically providing Namer with significant agricultural bounty and relatively sufficient water resources.

== History ==
Namer was mentioned by the 4th-century historian Eusebius. The 5th-century historian Jerome noted that it was a significant settlement and a place used by Nabatean nomads to encamp and convene.

During Mamluk rule (1260s–1517), Namer was part of the wilaya of Adhri'at (Daraa).

=== Ottoman period ===
With the advent of Ottoman rule in Syria in 1517, Namir or part of its revenues were granted as a tax-exempt timar (fief) to the amir al-arab (commander of the Bedouin), which was a hereditary office of the Al Hayar family. It was the center of the Banu Malik al-Ashraf nahiye (subdistrict) of the Hauran Sanjak. In 1596, it appeared in the Ottoman tax registers under the name of 'Tamir'. It had a Muslim population consisting of 98 households and 45 bachelors. They paid a fixed tax-rate of 40% on agricultural products, including wheat (7,800 akçe), barley (820 a.), summer crops (610 a.), goats and bee-hives (1500 a.), in addition to winter pastures (407 a.) and "occasional revenues"(610 a.); a total of 11,467 akçe. 9/24 of the income went to a waqf (endowment).

In 1838, it was noted as being east of ash-Shaykh Miskin, with a Sunni Muslim population.

=== Modern era ===
Namer is one of a few towns in the Daraa Governorate with a significant Christian population.

==== Civil War ====
During the civil war, some of Namer’s Christian residents joined the local branch of the Popular Committees, organized by the National Defense Forces, which played an auxiliary role in the Syrian Army's recapture of nearby Khirbet Ghazaleh from Free Syrian Army rebels in May 2013.

== Demographics ==
In 2011, the Melkite Greek Catholic Church had approximately 1,000 believers.

== Religious buildings ==
- Our Lady of the Annunciation Melkite Greek Catholic Church
- The Old Mosque
- Musa ibn Nusayr Mosque
- Saladin Ayyubi Mosque

== See also ==
- Christians in Syria

== Bibliography ==
- Bakhit, Muhammad Adnan Salamah (February 1972). The Ottoman Province of Damascus in the Sixteenth Century (PhD). School of Oriental and African Studies, University of London. S2CID 190680221.
- Elisséeff, N. (1993). "Namāra—3. Modern Nāmir (Namr, Nimr) al-Hawāʾ". In Bosworth, C. E.; van Donzel, E.; Heinrichs, W. P. & Pellat, Ch. (eds.). The Encyclopaedia of Islam, Second Edition. Volume VII: Mif–Naz. Leiden: E. J. Brill. pp. 944–947. ISBN 978-90-04-09419-2.
- Hütteroth, W.-D.; Abdulfattah, K. (1977). Historical Geography of Palestine, Transjordan and Southern Syria in the Late 16th Century. Erlanger Geographische Arbeiten, Sonderband 5. Erlangen, Germany: Vorstand der Fränkischen Geographischen Gesellschaft. ISBN 3-920405-41-2.
- Robinson, E.; Smith, E. (1841). Biblical Researches in Palestine, Mount Sinai and Arabia Petraea: A Journal of Travels in the year 1838. Vol. 3. Boston: Crocker & Brewster.
