= As-Suhailiyah =

As-Suhailiyah السحيلية
- Village
- Location within Syria
- Coordinates: 32°53′20″N 36°09′21″E
- PAL: 258/255
- Country: Syria
- Governorate: Daraa
- District: Izraa
- Subdistrict: Shaykh Miskin

Population (2004)
  - Total: 603
- Time zone: UTC+2 (EET)
  - Summer (DST): UTC+3 (EEST)

As-Suhailiyah (Arabic: السحيلية) is a village in southern Syria, administratively part of the Izraa District in the Daraa Governorate. According to the Syria Central Bureau of Statistics (CBS), as-Suhailiyah had a population of 603 in the 2004 census. Its inhabitants are predominantly Sunni Muslims.

== Religious buildings ==
- Al-Rahman Mosque
