= Ash-Shoumara =

Ash-Shoumara الشومرة
- Village
- Country: Syria
- Governorate: Daraa
- District: Izraa
- Subdistrict: Izraa

Population (2004 census)
  - Total: 553

Ash-Shoumara (Arabic: الشومرة) is a village in southern Syria, administratively part of the Izraa District in the Daraa Governorate. According to the Syria Central Bureau of Statistics (CBS), ash-Shoumara had a population of 553 in the 2004 census. Its inhabitants are predominantly Sunni Muslims.

== Religious buildings ==
- Mosque
