= Asem, Daraa =

Asem عاسم
- Village
- Location in Syria
- Coordinates: 32°56′50″N 36°19′28″E
- PAL: 274/262
- Country: Syria
- Governorate: Daraa
- District: Izraa
- Subdistrict: Izraa

Population (2004 census)
  - Total: 821

Asem (Arabic: عاسم) is a village in southern Syria, administratively part of the Izraa District in the Daraa Governorate. According to the Syria Central Bureau of Statistics (CBS), Asem had a population of 821 in the 2004 census. Its inhabitants are predominantly Sunni Muslims.

== Religious buildings ==
- Khalid ibn al-Walid Mosque
