= Alma, Syria =

Alma علما Elmah
- Town
- Location within Syria
- Coordinates: 32°44′N 36°14′E
- Grid position: 267/240
- Country: Syria
- Governorate: Daraa
- District: Daraa
- Subdistrict: Khirbet Ghazaleh

Population (2004)
  - Total: 6,297
- Time zone: UTC+3 (AST)

Alma or Elmah (Arabic: علما) is a village in the Daraa District of the Daraa Governorate, Syria. According to the 2004 census, the population was estimated at 6,297 people.

It is located near Khirbet Ghazaleh and belongs to a sub-district of a same name.

== History ==
Alma is identified with the ancient Jewish village of Helam or Alema (Greek: Αλαμα), a place in Gilead mentioned in 1 Maccabees.

=== Ottoman era ===
In the Ottoman tax registers of 1596, it was a village named Alama, located the nahiya of Bani Malik al-Asraf, Qada of Hauran. It had a population of 12 households and 7 bachelors, all Muslims. They paid a fixed tax-rate of 40% on agricultural products, including wheat (6000 akçe), barley (1350), summer crops (650), goats and beehives (50), in addition to occasional revenues (10); a total of 8,060 akçe. 1/3 of the revenue went to a waqf.

In 1838, its inhabitants were again noted as being Muslim, located south of Al-Shaykh Maskin.

== Bibliography ==
- Hütteroth, W.-D.; Abdulfattah, K. (1977). Historical Geography of Palestine, Transjordan and Southern Syria in the Late 16th Century. Erlanger Geographische Arbeiten, Sonderband 5. Erlangen, Germany: Vorstand der Fränkischen Geographischen Gesellschaft. ISBN 3-920405-41-2.
- Robinson, E.; Smith, E. (1841). Biblical Researches in Palestine, Mount Sinai and Arabia Petraea: A Journal of Travels in the year 1838. Vol. 3. Boston: Crocker & Brewster.
