= Abtaa =

Abtaa أبطع
- Village
- Location within Syria
- Coordinates: 32°47′30″N 36°9′9″E
- Grid position: 258/244
- Country: Syria
- Governorate: Daraa
- District: Daraa
- Subdistrict: Da'el

Population (2004)
  - Total: 14,283
- Time zone: UTC+3 (AST)

Abtaa (Arabic: أبطع; transliteration: Ibṭaʿ, also spelled Ibta or Obtei'a) is a town in southern Syria, administratively part of the Daraa District in the Daraa Governorate. Nearby localities include Da'el to the south, Khirbet Ghazaleh to the southeast, Namer to the east, Qarfa to the northeast and al-Shaykh Maskin to the north. According to the Syria Central Bureau of Statistics Abtaa had a population of 14,283.

== History ==
Abtaa dates back to antiquity, having been mentioned in pre-Islamic Syriac texts.

In 1596 Abtaa appeared in the Ottoman tax registers as Bita' and was part of the nahiya of Bani Malik al-Asraf in the Hauran Sanjak. It had an entirely Muslim population consisting of 44 households and 20 bachelors. The villagers paid a fixed tax rate of 40% on various agricultural products, including wheat, barley, summer crops, goats and beehives; a total of 5,000 akçe.

In 1838 it was noted as a Muslim village, situated in the Nukrah district, south of Al-Shaykh Maskin. In the 1850s the Western traveler Josias Leslie Porter noted that Abtaa contained a number of large "old houses of basalt, and a few broken columns."

== Bibliography ==
- Honigman, E. (1995). "Al-Nukra". The Encyclopedia of Islam, New Edition, Volume VIII: Ned–Sam. Leiden and New York: BRILL. p. 114. ISBN 90-04-09834-8.
- Hütteroth, W.-D.; Abdulfattah, K. (1977). Historical Geography of Palestine, Transjordan and Southern Syria in the Late 16th Century. Erlanger Geographische Arbeiten, Sonderband 5. Erlangen, Germany: Vorstand der Fränkischen Geographischen Gesellschaft. ISBN 3-920405-41-2.
- Porter, J.L. (1858). A Handbook for Travellers in Syria and Palestine. Vol. 1. Murray.
- Robinson, E.; Smith, E. (1841). Biblical Researches in Palestine, Mount Sinai and Arabia Petraea: A Journal of Travels in the year 1838. Vol. 3. Boston: Crocker & Brewster.
