= Al-Bakkar Sharqi =

Al-Bakkar Sharqi البكار شرقي
- Village
- Location within Syria
- Coordinates: 32°52′27″N 35°55′42″E
- PAL: 237/253
- Country: Syria
- Governorate: Daraa
- District: Izraa
- Subdistrict: Tasil

Population (2004)
  - Total: 960
- Time zone: UTC+2 (EET)
  - Summer (DST): UTC+3 (EEST)

Al-Bakkar Sharqi (Arabic: البكار شرقي) is a village in southern Syria, administratively part of the Izraa District in the Daraa Governorate. According to the Syria Central Bureau of Statistics (CBS), al-Bakkar Sharqi had a population of 960 in the 2004 census. Its inhabitants are predominantly Sunni Muslims.

== History ==
=== Civil War ===
On 28 September 2021, Syrian Army units reinforced their positions in several villages of Daraa's countryside after settlement agreements, including in al-Bakkar Sharqi, where militants, wanted persons, and deserters handed over weapons and had their status regularized.

== Religious buildings ==
- Mosque
