= Al-Fuqiaa =

Al-Fuqiaa الفقيع
- Village
- Location within Syria
- Coordinates: 32°56′42″N 36°10′09″E
- PAL: 259/261
- Country: Syria
- Governorate: Daraa
- District: Izraa
- Subdistrict: Shaykh Miskin

Population (2004)
  - Total: 1,047
- Time zone: UTC+2 (EET)
  - Summer (DST): UTC+3 (EEST)

Al-Fuqiaa (Arabic: الفقيع) is a village in southern Syria, administratively part of the Izraa District in the Daraa Governorate. According to the Syria Central Bureau of Statistics (CBS), al-Fuqiaa had a population of 1,047 in the 2004 census. Its inhabitants are predominantly Sunni Muslims.

== History ==
=== Civil War ===
Two children were killed in al-Fuqiaa village in 2022, by an explosive device reportedly left behind by armed groups, according to SANA.

== Religious buildings ==
- Uthman ibn Affan Mosque
