= As-Sukkariyah =

As-Sukkariyah السكرية
- Village
- Location within Syria
- Coordinates: 32°55′35″N 35°58′58″E
- PAL: 242/259
- Country: Syria
- Governorate: Daraa
- District: Izraa
- Subdistrict: Nawa

Population (2004)
  - Total: 973
- Time zone: UTC+2 (EET)
  - Summer (DST): UTC+3 (EEST)

As-Sukkariyah (Arabic: السكرية) is a village in southern Syria, administratively part of the Izraa District in the Daraa Governorate. According to the Syria Central Bureau of Statistics (CBS), as-Sukkariyah had a population of 973 in the 2004 census. Its inhabitants are predominantly Sunni Muslims.

== Religious buildings ==
- Omar Ibn Al-Khattab Mosque
