= As-Sawra =

As-Sawra الصورة As-Sawara
- Town
- Location within Syria
- Coordinates: 32°44′56″N 36°15′37″E
- PAL: 268/239
- Country: Syria
- Governorate: Daraa
- District: Izraa
- Subdistrict: Hirak

Population (2004 census)
  - Total: 4,021
- Time zone: UTC+2 (EET)
  - Summer (DST): UTC+3 (EEST)

As-Sawra (Arabic: الصورة) is a town in southern Syria, administratively part of the Daraa Governorate. According to the Syria Central Bureau of Statistics (CBS), As-Sawra had a population of 4,021 in the 2004 census. Its inhabitants are predominantly Sunni Muslims.

== History ==
In 1838, it was noted as Es-Saura, being east of ash-Shaykh Miskin, with a Sunni Muslim population.

== Religious buildings ==
- Abu Bakr al-Siddiq Mosque
- Al-Jilani Mosque

== Bibliography ==
- Robinson, E.; Smith, E. (1841). Biblical Researches in Palestine, Mount Sinai and Arabia Petraea: A Journal of Travels in the year 1838. Vol. 3. Boston: Crocker & Brewster.
