= List of cities in Syria =

The country of Syria is administratively subdivided into 14 governorates, which are further sub-divided into 65 districts, which are further divided into 284 sub-districts. Each of the governorates and districts has its own centre or capital city, except for Rif Dimashq Governorate and Markaz Rif Dimashq district. All the sub-districts also have their own centres as well.

Each district bears the same name as its administrative centre, with the exception of Mount Simeon District where the centre is the city of Aleppo. The same applies to all nahiyas (sub-districts), except for the Mount Simeon Nahiyah where the centre is the city of Aleppo.

== Governorate and district capital cities ==

Sixty-four of the 65 districts of Syria have a city that serves as the regional capital (administrative centre); Markaz Rif Dimashq is a district with no official regional centre.

The city of Damascus functions as a governorate, a district and a subdistrict. The Rif Dimashq Governorate has no official centre and its headquarters are in Damascus.

The first 13 cities in the list are the centre of their governorate, as well as of their district.

The population figures are from the 2004 official census.

Governorates of Syria Hasakah Governorate Deir ez-Zor Governorate Raqqa Governorate Aleppo Governorate Idlib Governorate Latakia Governorate Tartus Governorate Hama Governorate Homs Governorate Damascus and Rif Dimashq Suwayda Governorate Daraa Governorate Quneitra Governorate

English name	Arabic name	Population	District	Governorate
Aleppo (metropolitan area)	حلب	2,132,100	Mount Simeon District	Aleppo Governorate
Damascus (city)	دمشق	1,414,913	Damascus (as a district)	Damascus Governorate
Homs	حمص	652,609	Homs District	Homs Governorate
Latakia	اللاذقية	383,786	Latakia District	Latakia Governorate
Hama	حماة	312,994	Hama District	Hama Governorate
Raqqa	الرقة	220,488	Raqqa District	Raqqa Governorate
Deir ez-Zor	دير الزور	211,857	Deir ez-Zor District	Deir ez-Zor Governorate
Hasakah	الحسكة	188,160	Hasakah District	Hasakah Governorate
Qamishli	القامشلي	184,231	Qamishli District	Hasakah Governorate
Tartus	طرطوس	115,769	Tartus District	Tartus Governorate
Douma	دوما	110,893	Douma District	Rif Dimashq Governorate
Manbij	منبج	99,497	Manbij District	Aleppo Governorate
Idlib	ادلب	98,791	Idlib District	Idlib Governorate
Daraa	درعا	97,969	Daraa District	Daraa Governorate
Darayya	داريا	78,763	Darayya District	Rif Dimashq Governorate
Suwayda	السويداء	73,641	Suwayda District	Suwayda Governorate
Tabqa	الطبقة	69,425	Tabqa District	Raqqa Governorate
Salamiyah	سلمية	66,724	Salamiyah District	Hama Governorate
Al-Safira	السفيرة	63,708	Al-Safira District	Aleppo Governorate
Al-Bab	الباب	63,069	Al-Bab District	Aleppo Governorate
Maarat al-Numan	معرة النعمان	58,008	Maarat al-Numaan District	Idlib Governorate
Jableh	جبلة	53,989	Jableh District	Latakia Governorate
Palmyra	تدمر	51,323	Tadmur District	Homs Governorate
Nawa	نوى	47,066	Izraa District	Daraa Governorate
Ayn al-Arab	عين العرب	44,821	Ayn Al-Arab District	Aleppo Governorate
Al-Tall	التل	44,597	Al-Tall District	Rif Dimashq Governorate
Mayadin	الميادين	44,028	Mayadin District	Deir ez-Zor Governorate
Abu Kamal	البوكمال	42,510	Abu Kamal District	Deir ez-Zor Governorate
Baniyas	بانياس	41,632	Baniyas District	Tartus Governorate
Jisr al-Shughur	جسر الشغور	39,917	Jisr al-Shughur District	Idlib Governorate
Al-Rastan	الرستن	39,834	Al-Rastan District	Homs Governorate
Ariha	أريحا	39,501	Arihah District	Idlib Governorate
Afrin	عفرين	36,562	Afrin District	Aleppo Governorate
Qatana	قطنا	33,996	Qatana District	Rif Dimashq Governorate
Qudsaya	قدسيا	33,571	Qudsaya District	Rif Dimashq Governorate
An-Nabk	النبك	32,548	Al-Nabk District	Rif Dimashq Governorate
Jasim	جاسم	31,683	Izraa District	Daraa Governorate
Azaz	أعزاز	31,623	Azaz District	Aleppo Governorate
Al-Qusayr	القصير	29,818	Al-Qusayr District	Homs Governorate
Ras al-Ayn	رأس العين	29,347	Ras al-Ayn District	Hasakah Governorate
Al-Qutayfah	القطيفة	26,671	Al-Qutayfah District	Rif Dimashq Governorate
Al-Malikiyah	المالكية	26,311	Al-Malikiyah District	Hasakah Governorate
Zabadani	الزبداني	26,285	Zabadani District	Rif Dimashq Governorate
Al-Sanamayn	الصنمين	26,268	Al-Sanamayn District	Daraa Governorate
Yabroud	يبرود	25,891	Yabroud District	Rif Dimashq Governorate
Ash-Shaykh Miskin	الشيخ مسكين	24,057	Izraa District	Daraa Governorate
Salqin	سلقين	23,500	Salqin Nahiyah	Idlib Governorate
Masyaf	مصياف	22,508	Masyaf District	Hama Governorate
Harem	حارم	21,934	Harem District	Idlib Governorate
Al-Hirak	الحراك	20,760	Izraa District	Daraa Governorate
Safita	صافيتا	20,301	Safita District	Tartus Governorate
Izraa	ازرع	19,158	Izraa District	Daraa Governorate
Dayr Hafir	دير حافر	18,948	Dayr Hafir District	Aleppo Governorate
Talkalakh	تلكلخ	18,412	Talkalakh District	Homs Governorate
Mhardeh	محردة	17,578	Mhardeh District	Hama Governorate
Taldou	تلدو	15,727	Taldou District	Homs Governorate
Tell Abyad	تل أبيض	14,825	Tell Abyad District	Raqqa Governorate
Al-Suqaylabiyah	السقيلبية	13,920	Al-Suqaylabiyah District	Hama Governorate
Duraykish	دريكيش	13,244	Duraykish District	Tartus Governorate
Jarabulus	جرابلس	11,570	Jarabulus District	Aleppo Governorate
Atarib	الأتارب	10,657	Atarib District	Aleppo Governorate
Al-Shaykh Badr	الشيخ بدر	9,486	Al-Shaykh Badr District	Tartus Governorate
Salkhad	صلخد	9,155	Salkhad District	Suwayda Governorate
Qardaha	القرداحة	8,671	Qardaha District	Latakia Governorate
Al-Mukharram	المخرم	6,202	Al-Mukharram District	Homs Governorate
Al-Haffah	الحفة	4,298	Al-Haffah District	Latakia Governorate
Quneitra	القنيطرة	153	Quneitra District	Quneitra Governorate
Fiq	فيق	0	Fiq District	Quneitra Governorate

== Other cities ==
English name	Arabic name	Governorate	Population
Sayyidah Zaynab	السيدة زينب	Rif Dimashq Governorate	136,427
Al-Hajar al-Aswad	الحجر الأسود	Rif Dimashq Governorate	84,948
Binnish	بنش	Idlib Governorate	21,848
Bosra	بصرى	Daraa Governorate	19,683
Dayr 'Atiyah	دير عطية	Rif Dimashq Governorate	10,984
Harasta	حرستا	Rif Dimashq Governorate	68,708
Jaramana	جرمانا	Rif Dimashq Governorate	114,363
Kafr Nabl	كفر نبل	Idlib Governorate	15,455
Khan Shaykhun	خان شيخون	Idlib Governorate	34,371
Ma'arrat Misrin	معرتمصرين	Idlib Governorate	17,519
Nawa	نوى	Daraa Governorate	47,066
Kafr Takharim	كفر تخاريم	Idlib Governorate	21,012
Saraqib	سراقب	Idlib Governorate	32,495
Talbiseh	تلبيسة	Homs Governorate	30,796

== See also ==
- Cities and towns during the Syrian civil war
- Districts of Syria
- Governorates of Syria
- List of towns and villages in Syria
