= Namar, Syria =

Nimer نمر
- Town
- Location within Syria
- Coordinates: 33°1′20″N 36°1′47″E
- Grid position: 246/269 PAL
- Country: Syria
- Governorate: Daraa
- District: Izraa
- Subdistrict: Jasim

Population (2004 census)
  - Total: 7,941
- Time zone: UTC+2 (EET)
  - Summer (DST): UTC+3 (EEST)

Nimer (Arabic: نمر, romanized: Nāmr, also transliterated Namr or Nimr), is a town in southern Syria, administratively belonging to the Izraa District of the Daraa Governorate. According to the Syria Central Bureau of Statistics (CBS), Nimer had a population of 7,941 in the 2004 census. Its inhabitants are predominantly Sunni Muslims.

== History ==
Nimer, according to Biblical accounts, where it is named 'Nimre' or 'Beth Nimrah', was a fortified center lying amid sheep pastures and surrounded by meadows. These accounts hold it was destroyed in a conflict in the 13th century BCE and then reconstructed in 1230 BCE by a grandson of Jacob.

The village is recorded as Namarianos (Ναμαριανός) in the Diocletianic boundary stones corpus, dated to c. 300 CE.

The village was placed by the 10th-century historian al-Mas'udi a few miles to the north of Jabiya and Nawa in the district of Jawlan (Golan Heights). Nimer was used by the Zengid emir Nur al-Din as an army encampment for his military campaigns to Egypt in 1168 and 1170.

=== Ottoman period ===
In 1596 Nimer appeared under the name of Namar in the Ottoman tax registers being in the nahiya of Jaydur in the Hauran Sanjak. It had an entirely Muslim population consisting of 36 households and 20 bachelors. The villagers paid a fixed tax-rate of 25% on agricultural products, such as wheat (12,000 akçe), barley (2,070 a.), summer crops (930 a.), goats and beehives (600 a.); in addition to "occasional revenues" (540 a.); a total of 16,140 akçe. 7/24 of the revenue went to a waqf.

== Geography ==
Nimer is located in the Nuqrah, the wide plain of the southern Hauran. It is situated south of Aqraba and al-Harra and north of Nawa. It lies near the southern foot of Tell al-Hara (the highest elevation in Hauran plains), east of the Nahr al-Allan stream and west of the Lajat volcanic field.

== Religious buildings ==
- Omar ibn al-Khattab Mosque
- Al-Taqwa Mosque
- Abu Bakr al-Siddiq Mosque
- Khalid ibn al-Walid Mosque
- Uthman ibn Affan Mosque
- Ibad al-Rahman Mosque
- Zayd ibn Thabit Mosque

== Bibliography ==
- Elisséeff, N. (1993). "Namāra—3. Modern Nāmir (Namr, Nimr) al-Hawāʾ". In Bosworth, C. E.; van Donzel, E.; Heinrichs, W. P. & Pellat, Ch. (eds.). The Encyclopaedia of Islam, Second Edition. Volume VII: Mif–Naz. Leiden: E. J. Brill. pp. 944–947. ISBN 978-90-04-09419-2.
- Hütteroth, W.-D.; Abdulfattah, K. (1977). Historical Geography of Palestine, Transjordan and Southern Syria in the Late 16th Century. Erlanger Geographische Arbeiten, Sonderband 5. Erlangen, Germany: Vorstand der Fränkischen Geographischen Gesellschaft. ISBN 3-920405-41-2.
