= Inkhil =

Town in southern Syria

Inkhil إنخل
- City
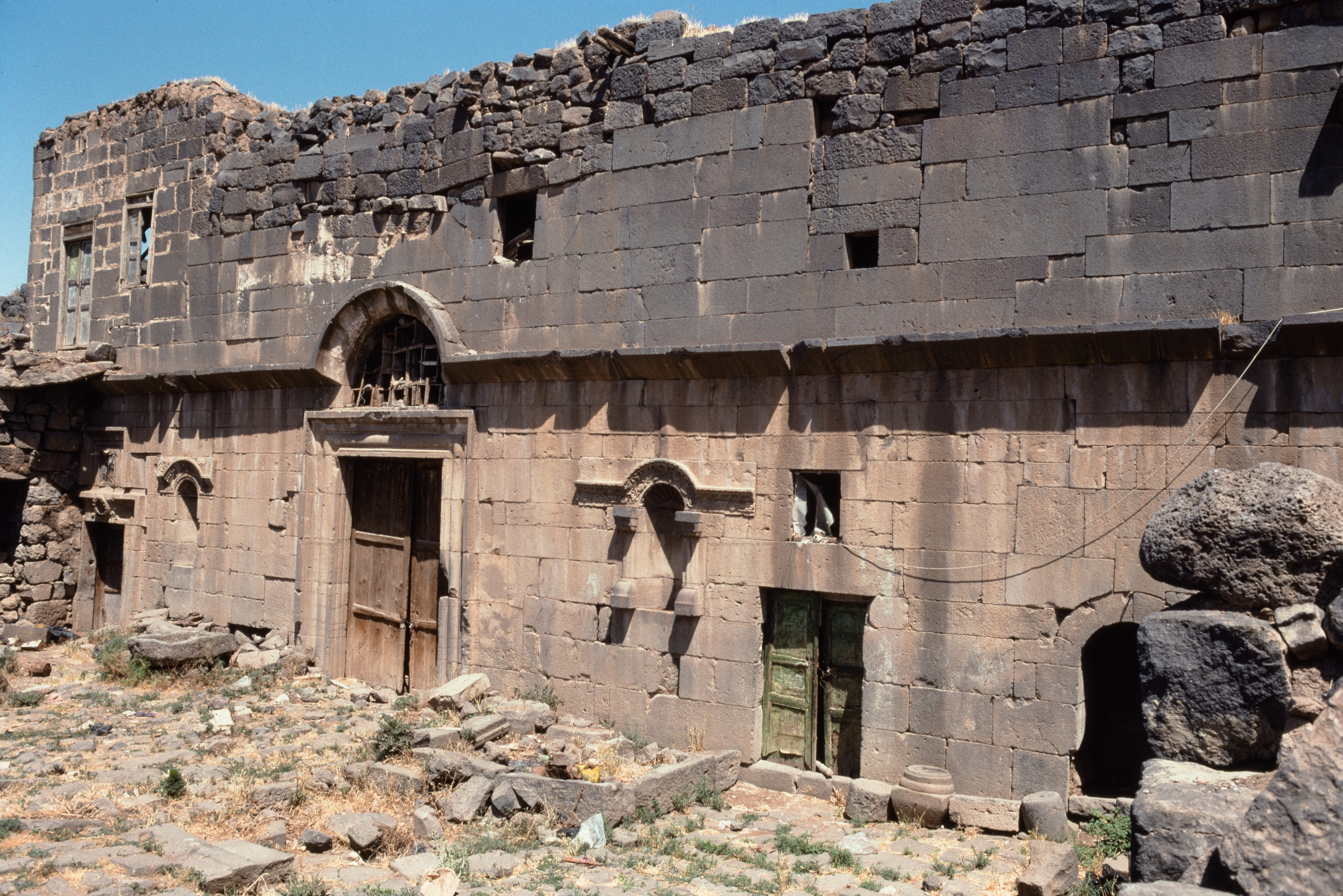
- Roman villa in Inkhil

- Location within Syria
- Coordinates: 33°01′15″N 36°07′45″E
- Grid position: 256/269
- Country: Syria
- Governorate: Daraa
- District: Sanamayn
- Subdistrict: Sanamayn

Population (2004 census)
  - Total: 31,258
- Time zone: UTC+3 (AST)

Inkhil (Arabic: إنخل, romanized: Ankhil) is a city in southern Syria, administratively part of the as-Sanamayn District in the Daraa Governorate. It is located north of Daraa and just east of the Golan Heights in the Hauran plain. According to the Syria Central Bureau of Statistics (CBS), Inkhil had a population of 31,258 in the 2004 census. The city's inhabitants are predominantly Sunni Muslims.

== History ==
=== Roman period ===
In antiquity, Inkhil was known as Neeila. Among the ancient ruins found in the village are the remains of a large villa dating to the 2nd century CE during Roman rule. Within the building is a large vaulted central hall which connects to several rooms containing busts and other Roman-era sculptures carved from basalt. Its facade has highly decorated entrances and conch-head niches.

An inscription found on lintel fragments in an abandoned house records the construction of a temple in 161–163 CE, funded by temple treasurers named Ailius Torquatus and Sados.

During Byzantine rule, Inkhil was dominated by the Ghassanids, Arab vassals of the empire based in nearby Jabiya.

=== Ottoman period ===
In 1596, Inkhil appeared in the Ottoman tax registers under the name of Nahal, being part of the nahiya of Bani Kilab in the Sanjak of Hauran. It had an entirely Muslim population consisting of 86 households and 45 bachelors. They paid a fixed tax rate of 40% on agricultural products, including wheat, barley, summer crops, goats and beehives; in addition to occasional revenues; a total of 13,000 akçe. Most of the income (22 out of 24 parts) went to a waqf (religious trust).

In the early 1840s, the city consisted of about 50 houses, all of which were inhabited by Muslims. According to German archaeologist Gottlieb Schumacher, Inkhil was recorded to be a "small place numbering 55 to 60 huts" in 1897.

=== Modern era ===
==== Civil war ====
Inkhil was one of the first cities to participate in the Syrian uprising against the government of Bashar al-Assad in March 2011 following demonstrations in Daraa. On 19 August 2012, four protesters were killed and dozens injured after Syrian security forces shot at demonstrators emerging from a mosque following Friday prayers. By 30 September 2016, there were 14,845 refugees from Inkhil (Ankhal) registered in Jordan.

==== Iran war ====
During the 2026 Iran war, an Iranian drone targeting Israel was shot down by the Israelis over Inkhil.

== Religious buildings ==
- Al-Umari/Omari Mosque
- Khalid ibn al-Walid Mosque
- Companions/as-Sahaba Mosque
- Al-Huda Mosque
- Al-Bassam Mosque
- Al-Mustafa Mosque
- Al-Ansar Mosque
- Al-Qasim Mosque
- Saad Mosque
- Abu Bakr Al-Siddiq Mosque
- Hussein Mustafa Al-Shabli Mosque

== Bibliography ==
- Ball, Warwick (2002). Rome in the East. Routledge. ISBN 9780415243575.
- Hütteroth, W.-D.; Abdulfattah, K. (1977). Historical Geography of Palestine, Transjordan and Southern Syria in the Late 16th Century. Erlanger Geographische Arbeiten, Sonderband 5. Erlangen, Germany: Vorstand der Fränkischen Geographischen Gesellschaft. ISBN 3-920405-41-2.
- Mazzilli, Francesca (2018). Rural Cult Centres in the Hauran: Part of the Broader Network of the Near East (100 BC–AD 300). Archaeopress Roman Archaeology. Oxford: Archaeopress.
- Newbold, Captain (1846). "On the site of Ashtaroth". The Journal of the Royal Geographical Society. 16. Murray: 331–338. doi:10.2307/1798240. JSTOR 1798240.
- Schumacher, G. (1897). "Notes from Jedur". Quarterly Statement - Palestine Exploration Fund. 29: 190–195. doi:10.1179/peq.1897.29.3.190.
- Shahîd, I. (2002). Byzantium and the Arabs in the Sixth Century: pt. 1, Toponymy, Monuments, Historical Geography, and Frontier Studies. Dumbarton Oaks Research Library and Collection. ISBN 0884022145.
