= Nahtah =

Nahtah ناحتة
- Town
- Location within Syria
- Coordinates: 32°47′20″N 36°20′56″E
- PAL: 276/244
- Country: Syria
- Governorate: Daraa
- District: Izraa
- Subdistrict: Hirak

Population (2004)
  - Total: 7,789
- Time zone: UTC+2 (EET)
  - Summer (DST): UTC+3 (EEST)

Nahtah (Arabic: ناحتة) is a town in southern Syria, administratively part of the Izraa District in the Daraa Governorate. According to the Syria Central Bureau of Statistics (CBS), Nahtah had a population of 7,789 in the 2004 census. Its inhabitants are predominantly Sunni Muslims.

== History ==
In 1596 Nahtah appeared in the Ottoman tax registers as Nahta and was part of the nahiya of Bani Malik al-Asraf in the Hauran Sanjak. It had an entirely Muslim population consisting of 33 households and 19 bachelors. The villagers paid a fixed tax rate of 40% on various agricultural products, including wheat (7500 a.), barley (1800 a.), summer crops (1200 a.), goats and beehives (300 a,), in addition to "occasional revenues" (200 a.); a total of 11,000 akçe.

In 1838, it was noted as being east of ash-Shaykh Miskin, with a Sunni Muslim population.

== Religious buildings ==
- Omar Al-Farooq Mosque
- Ammar ibn Yasir Mosque
- Hamza ibn Abdul-Muttalib Mosque
- Old Mosque (abandoned)

== Bibliography ==
- Hütteroth, W.-D.; Abdulfattah, K. (1977). Historical Geography of Palestine, Transjordan and Southern Syria in the Late 16th Century. Erlanger Geographische Arbeiten, Sonderband 5. Erlangen, Germany: Vorstand der Fränkischen Geographischen Gesellschaft. ISBN 3-920405-41-2.
- Robinson, E.; Smith, E. (1841). Biblical Researches in Palestine, Mount Sinai and Arabia Petraea: A Journal of Travels in the year 1838. Vol. 3. Boston: Crocker & Brewster.
