= Al-Hirak, Daraa =

Town in Syria

Al-Hirak الحراك
- City
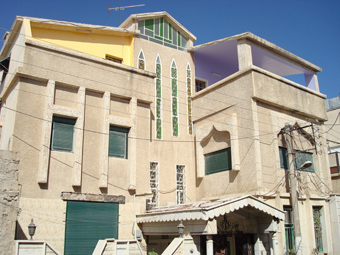
- Al-Hirak, Syria

- Location within Syria
- Coordinates: 32°45′4″N 36°18′19″E
- Grid position: 273/239; 271/239 PAL
- Country: Syria
- Governorate: Daraa
- District: Izraa
- Subdistrict: Hirak
- Elevation: 620 m (2,030 ft)

Population (2004)
  - Total: 20,760
- Time zone: UTC+2 (EET)
  - Summer (DST): UTC+3 (EEST)

Al-Hirak (Arabic: الحراك also spelled al-Hrak or Herak) is a city in southern Syria, administratively belonging to the Izraa District of the Daraa Governorate. It is situated about 40 kilometers northeast of Daraa, and is surrounded by the towns of Al-Mlaihah al-Gharbiyah to the east and Izraa to the northeast.

According to the 2004 census by the Central Bureau of Statistics (CBS), al-Hirak had a population of 20,760. It is the administrative center of a nahiyah ("subdistrict") consisting of six localities with a combined population of 40,979 in the 2004 census. Its inhabitants are predominantly Sunni Muslims. It is primarily inhabited by clans originally from the Hejaz who arrived in the region in the 17th and 18th centuries and settled there, such as Al Zamil, Al Salamat (historically allied to the currently-ruling Al-Sharaa family) and Abu Salem, all of which belong to the Anaza tribe. Other clans, such as Al-Qaddah (from the Islamic prophets tribe of Quraysh), Al-Kheirat, Al-Hareeri and Al-Kasabra inhabit the city.

Among its most important features is the ancient Al-Umari mosque, once a Christian monastery and before that a pagan temple for the worship of Baal, the sun god.

== History ==
In 1596 al-Hirak appeared in the Ottoman tax registers under the name of al-Harak al-Sharqi (the Eastern Hirak), being in the nahiya of Bani Malik al-Ashraf in the Qada Hawran. It had an entirely Muslim population consisting of 61 households and 31 bachelors. They paid a fixed tax-rate of 40% on agricultural products, including wheat, barley, summer crops, goats and bee-hives, in addition to occasional revenues; a total of 16,000 akçe. Just to the west was al-Harak al-Gharbi (the Western Hirak), which had a population of 17 households and 3 bachelors, also all Muslim. They also had a 40% tax-rate on agricultural products, and produced the same products. Their total tax was 3,600 akçe, and part of the income went to a waqf.

In 1838, it was noted as being south of ash-Shaykh Miskin, with a Sunni Muslim population. Nearby al-Harak al-Gharbi, later called Deir al-Sult, was noted as deserted.

=== Civil war ===
During the civil war, al-Hirak has served as a base for the opposition forces of the Free Syrian Army (FSA). On March 6, 2012, the city was severely damaged during clashes between the Syrian Army and the FSA, a fighting that was described by the United Kingdom-based Syrian Observatory for Human Rights as "very intense." Residential areas and the Abu Bakr al-Saddiq Mosque -serving as military base for the rebels- were reportedly hit by Syrian Army shells. During the battle, the FSA ambushed a Syrian Army armored carrier, killing five soldiers. A 15-year-old boy was reported to be killed after being allegedly shot by a government sniper. "Mosque al-Herak" is named on the Global Heritage Fund listing of damages to Syrian cultural heritage due to the military operations.

In July 2012 about 4,000 residents living in the south of Al-Hirak fled to neighboring cities in Syria or Jordan. The city was repeatedly shelled by the regime throughout August 2012. By August 21, 2012, the FSA had withdrawn from the city. On November 12 and 13, 2012, the city was reported as having a rebel presence and being shelled by the army. On May 3, 2013, it was reported that the base of the 52 mechanized brigade of the 9th Division was shelling the area of Khirbet Ghazala and Al-Hirak On June 9, 2015, the FSA captured the second largest military base in the Daraa Governorate located east of the city. On June 28, 2018, several locations were deserted by rebel forces in sequence: Battalion 49 Base, Alma, Al-Hirak, Battalion 279 Base, Al-Sourah.

== Religious buildings ==
- Abu Dharr al-Ghifari Mosque
- Amr ibn al-As Mosque
- Aisha Mosque
- Said ibn al-Musayyib Mosque
- Abu Bakr al-Siddiq Mosque
- Abu Ubayda ibn al-Jarrah Mosque
- Al-Maahad Mosque
- Abu Yasin Mosque
- Omar ibn al-Khattab Mosque

== Bibliography ==
- Hütteroth, W.-D.; Abdulfattah, K. (1977). Historical Geography of Palestine, Transjordan and Southern Syria in the Late 16th Century. Erlanger Geographische Arbeiten, Sonderband 5. Erlangen, Germany: Vorstand der Fränkischen Geographischen Gesellschaft. ISBN 3-920405-41-2.
- Robinson, E.; Smith, E. (1841). Biblical Researches in Palestine, Mount Sinai and Arabia Petraea: A Journal of Travels in the year 1838. Vol. 3. Boston: Crocker & Brewster.
