= Southern Syria offensive =

The Southern Syria Offensive may refer to:

- 2018 Southern Syria offensive (2018 offensive by SAA (government forces) backed by Russia against ISIL and rebel forces in Daraa, Suwayda, and Quneitra governates)
- Southern Syria offensive (2024) (2024 advance by rebel forces towards Damascus against Syrian Arab Army.)
