= Bosana (Syria) =

- بوسان (Arabic)
- Location within Syria
- 32°41′29.39″N 36°47′26.87″E
- Location: Syria
- Region: Suwayda Governorate

Bosana was an ancient city and bishopric in Roman Arabia, now a Latin Catholic titular see.

== History ==
Bosana, on the site of modern Busan in present Syria, was important enough in the Roman province of Arabia Petraea to become a suffragan of the Metropolitan of capital Bostra in the sway of the Patriarchate of Antioch.

None of its bishops was recorded at any council. However archaeological and epigraphic evidence accounts for a single of its bishops : Menas (floruit 573). It probably faded at the seventh century advent of Islam.

== Titular see ==
The diocese was nominally restored in 1933 as Titular bishopric of Bosana (Latin = Curiate Italian) / Bosanen(sis) (Latin adjective).

It is vacant since decades, having had the following incumbents, so far of the fitting Episcopal (lowest) rank :

- John Henry Tihen (1931.01.06 – death 1940.01.14) as emeritate; formerly Bishop of Lincoln (USA) (1911.05.12 – 1917.09.21), Bishop of Denver (Colorado, USA) (1917.09.21 – 1931.01.06)
- Vincentas Brizgys (1940.04.02 – 1992.04.23) as Auxiliary Bishop of Archdiocese of Kaunas (Lithuania) (1940.04.02 – 1992.04.23).

== See also ==
- List of Catholic dioceses in Syria

== Sources and external links ==
- GCatholic - (former &) titular see

Bibliography

- Siméon Vailhé, La province ecclésiastique d'Arabie, in Échos d'Orient, vol. 2, nº 2-4 (1899), p. 172
