= Mamdouh Hamadeh =

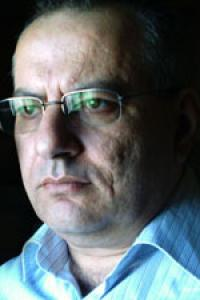
- Born: 1959 (age 66–67); Golan Heights, Syria

Mamdouh Hamadeh (Arabic: ممدوح حمادة) is a Syrian journalist and cartoonist. Hamadeh was born in 1959 in the Golan Heights. His family lived in Sweida in southern Syria until he traveled to the Soviet Union to study at the Faculty of Journalism at Belarus State University in Minsk, where in 1994 he was awarded a PhD degree.

== Career ==
Upon completion of his studies abroad, Hamadeh returned to Syria but was unable to find a job there. He spent more than a year and a half in Damascus. He then decided to return to Belarus, where he worked as a professor at one of its Universities for more than 10 years. He then studied film directing at the Belarusian State Academy of Arts. Now mainly in Belarus, he directed two films, The Guarantees for the Future, a short 30-minute feature film that he directed and directed, and directed another 7-minute film entitled "I'm Still Alive".

During his study and residence in Belarus, Mamdouh Hamadeh combed the art of caricatures intermittently and published his drawings and articles in the Belarusian newspapers and magazines in which he published his drawings between 1990 and 1994. He also participated in a number of caricatures around the world

He began to write scripts in 1995 and still works in this profession. In addition, he writes novels and occasionally publishes some of his works. In the latter period he publishes his stories in collections entitled "Dafater" i.e.(notebooks in Arabic)
