= Sakakah, Suwayda =

Sakakah سكاكة Sakaka, Skaka
- Village
- Location within Syria
- Coordinates: 32°42′25″N 36°22′35″E
- Grid position: 279/235
- Country: Syria
- Governorate: Suwayda
- District: Suwayda
- Subdistrict: Suwayda

Population (2004 census)
  - Total: 254
- Time zone: UTC+2 (EET)
  - Summer (DST): UTC+3 (EEST)

Sakakah (Arabic: سكاكة) is a village in southern Syria, administratively part of the Suwayda District of the Suwayda Governorate. According to the 2004 census, Sakakah had a population of 254. Its inhabitants are predominantly Sunni Muslim Bedouins.
