= Namir, Yemen =

Coordinates: 14°01′N 45°51′E

Namir
- Town
- Interactive map of Namir
- Country: Yemen
- Governorate: Abyan Governorate
- Time zone: UTC+3 (Yemen Standard Time)

Namir is a town in south-western Yemen. It is located in the Abyan Governorate.
