= 2004 Syrian census =

General Census of Population and Housing 2004
- September 2004

General information
- Country: Syria
- Authority: Central Bureau of Statistics

Results
- Total population: 17,920,844 (▲30.02%)
- Most populous region: Aleppo 4,045,166
- Least populous region: Quneitra 66,627
- ...

A population census was conducted in Syria in September 2004, from which the total population was measured as having reached 17.92 million. This is the last comprehensive and official census in the country. It was carried out by the Central Bureau of Statistics. It was supposed to conduct a census in 2014, but because of circumstances and sanctions, that did not occur, according to the former director of the Central Bureau of Statistics, Adnan Hmidan.

On 8 November 2004, the Director of the Central Bureau of Statistics, Ibrahim Ali, announced the preliminary results.

== Governorates ==
Rank	Governorate	2004	1994	Change	%
1	Aleppo	4,045,166	–	–	–
2	Rif Dimashq	2,273,074	–	–	–
3	Damascus	1,552,161	–	–	–
4	Homs	1,529,402	–	–	–
5	Hama	1,384,953	–	–	–
6	Hasakah	1,275,118	–	–	–
7	Idlib	1,258,427	–	–	–
8	Deir ez-Zor	1,004,747	–	–	–
9	Latakia	879,551	–	–	–
10	Daraa	843,478	–	–	–
11	Raqqa	793,514	–	–	–
12	Tartus	701,395	–	–	–
13	Suweida	313,231	–	–	–
14	Quneitra	66,627	–	–	–
	Syria	17,920,844	13,782,315	▲	30.02%
