= Busan, Suwayda =

Busan بوسان Bosan, Bosana
- Village
- Location within Syria
- Coordinates: 32°41′15″N 36°47′24″E
- Country: Syria
- Governorate: Suwayda
- District: Suwayda
- Subdistrict: Mushannaf

Population (2004 census)
  - Total: 1,332
- Time zone: UTC+2 (EET)
  - Summer (DST): UTC+3 (EEST)

Busan (Arabic: بوسان, romanized: Būsān) is a village situated in the Suwayda District of Suwayda Governorate, in southern Syria. According to the Syria Central Bureau of Statistics (CBS), Busan had a population of 1,332 in the 2004 census. Its inhabitants are predominantly Druze.

== History ==
The remains of a Roman-period temple were identified at Busan based on architectural fragments recorded by the Princeton University expedition. The surviving remains include a section of dressed stonework with mouldings, some elements of which were reused in houses probably dating from the Islamic period. Anne-Marie Dentzer-Feydy dated the temple to the mid-2nd century AD based on its architectural features.

In 1838, it was noted as a ruin, Jedeiya, situated "in the Lejah, south of Dama".

== Religious buildings ==
- Maqam Prophet Ayyub/Job (Druze Shrine)

== See also ==
- Bosana (Syria)
- Druze in Syria

== Bibliography ==
- Robinson, E.; Smith, E. (1841). Biblical Researches in Palestine, Mount Sinai and Arabia Petraea: A Journal of Travels in the year 1838. Vol. 3. Boston: Crocker & Brewster.
- Mazzilli, Francesca (2018). Rural Cult Centres in the Hauran: Part of the broader network of the Near East (100 BC–AD 300). Archaeopress. p. 164. doi:10.2307/j.ctvndv916. ISBN 978-1-78491-954-2.
