= Al-Qenniyah =

Al-Qenniyah القنية
- Town
- Location within Syria
- Coordinates: 33°00′42″N 36°11′04″E
- Country: Syria
- Governorate: Daraa Governorate
- District: As-Sanamayn District
- Nahiyah: As-Sanamayn

Population (2004)
  - Total: 7,256
- Time zone: UTC+3 (AST)

Al-Qenniyah (Arabic: القنية) is a town in southern Syria, administratively belonging to the As-Sanamayn District of the Daraa Governorate. According to the Syria Central Bureau of Statistics, it had a population of 7,256 in the 2004 census.
