= Nawa, Daraa =

Nawa نوى
- City
- Location in Syria
- Coordinates: 32°53′20″N 36°02′35″E
- Grid position: 247/255 PAL
- Country: Syria
- Governorate: Daraa
- District: Izraa
- Subdistrict: Nawa
- Elevation: 563 m (1,847 ft)

Population (2004 census)
  - Total: 47,066

Nawa (Arabic: نَوَىٰ, romanized: Nawā) is a city in southern Syria, administratively belonging to the Daraa Governorate. It has an altitude of 563 meters (1,847 ft). According to the Syria Central Bureau of Statistics (CBS), Nawa had a population of 47,066 in the 2004 census. It is the administrative center of a nahiyah ("subdistrict") consisting of six localities with a combined population of 57,404 in the 2004 census. Its inhabitants are predominantly Sunni Muslims.

In antiquity, Nawa had a significant Jewish population and also served as ecclesiastical seat, home to at least two 5th-century bishops. Under early Muslim rule Nawa was the principal city of the Hauran region and was widely associated with the prophet Job. The city declined at least by the 13th century. Under Mamluk rule it was the administrative center of the Jaydur district (the northwestern Hauran plain), a position it continued to under the Ottomans. Nawa remained a relatively large Muslim village throughout Ottoman rule, often second in size to Daraa. It was further characterized by its extensive basaltic ruins, many reused in the village's modern dwellings.

== History ==
=== Roman and Byzantine periods ===
During the Roman and Byzantine periods (1st–7th centuries CE), Nawa, then known as 'Naveh' or 'Neve,' had a large Jewish population. The city is mentioned in ancient Jewish sources such as in the 3rd-century Mosaic of Rehob and the Midrash Rabba under the Hebrew names נוה (Neve) and נינוה (Ninveh). Eusebius, a 4th-century Christian scholar, referred to it as Ninveh, describing it as a "city of Jews." The city was also noted by the Bordeaux Pilgrim, a Christian traveler who passed through in 333–334 CE, who referred to it as Neve. The city's role as a Jewish center is also noted in rabbinic literature, where several sages are said to have come from Neve, including Rabbi Eleazar de-min Ninveh, Rabbi Platia of Naveh, and Rabbi Shila of Naveh. Additionally, rabbinic sources mention a group of sages known as the Rabbanan de-Naveh (the rabbis of Naveh), active primarily in the later Talmudic period. Numerous basalt architectural elements from the Byzantine period, bearing Jewish symbols—most prominently the menorah—were discovered reused as spolia within Nawa.

The city is mentioned as 'Neve' in the Antonine Itinerary. The bishopric of Neve was a suffragan of Bostra, the metropolitan see of the Arabia Petraea province. Two of Neve's bishops are known: Petronius, who attended the Council of Ephesus in 431 and Jobius, who was present at the Council of Chalcedon in 451. The Diocese of Neve is noticed in the Notitia episcopatuum of the patriarchate of Antioch in the 6th century ("Échos d'Orient", X, 145). Nawa was mentioned by George of Cyprus ("Descriptio orbis romani", ed. Heinrich Gelzer, 54) in the 7th century.

The Hauran was dominated by the Ghassanids, the lead Arab foederati (tribal confederates) of the Byzantines, during the 6th and 7th centuries. They had their principal base at Jabiya, in Nawa's immediate vicinity. The historians Clive Foss and Irfan Shahid suggested that the Ghassanids left some architectural traces in Nawa, namely an audience chamber in one of the town's ruined palaces (which parallels that of al-Mundhir III outside Resafa) and churches.

=== Early Muslim period ===
Nawa came under Muslim rule following the decisive Battle of Yarmouk in 636. Under the Islamic caliphates of the Rashidun, Umayyads, Abbasids, and Fatimids (7th–11th centuries), Nawa was a part of Jund Dimashq (the military district of Damascus) and the principal city of the Hauran. It was destroyed in an earthquake in 749, according to the chronicler Michael the Syrian. Al-Mas'udi wrote in 943 that a mosque dedicated to Job was located 5 kilometers (3.1 mi) from Nawa. In 985 the Jerusalemite geographer al-Muqaddasi described Nawa as the principal city of the districts of Bathaniyya (the Hauran plain) and Hawran (the Jabal al-Arab) of Jund Dimashq, and that its land were rich in grain.

=== Ayyubid and Mamluk periods ===
By the 13th century, its status had declined. The Christian pilgrim Thietmar passed through Nawa in 1217–1218, during Ayyubid rule (1180s–1260s) and noted that it was in a ruined state and "inhabited by Saracens". The Syrian geographer Yaqut al-Hamawi recorded in 1225 that Nawa was "a small town of the Hauran," formerly the capital of the region. He described it as the city where Job dwelled in and the burial place of Shem, the son of Noah. In 1233, Imam Yahya ibn Sharaf al-Nawawi, a prominent Muslim scholar, commonly called simply Imam al-Nawawi, was born in Nawa, hence his nisba (epithet). His ancestor had moved there from the Jawlan (Golan Heights) and left several descendants in the village.

During the Mamluk period (1260s–1517), Nawa was the center of the amal (subdistrict) of Jaydur (the northwestern Hauran plain), part of the southern safqa (march) of the Damascus mamlaka (province). The village was mentioned by the 14th-century geographer Abulfeda.

=== Ottoman period ===
Following the Ottoman conquest of Syria in 1517, Sultan Selim I granted Nawa to the Bedouin emir of the Beqaa Valley, Nasir Ibn al-Hanash, as an iqta (tax farm) in return for ensuring Bedouin loyalty to the state. In 1596 Nawa appeared in the Ottoman tax registers as 'Nawi' and was part of the nahiya (subdistrict) of Jaydur in the Hauran Sanjak. It had an entirely Muslim population consisting of 102 households and 43 bachelors. The villagers paid a fixed tax-rate of 40% on wheat, barley, summer crops, goats and/or beehives; a total of 26,000 akçe. Nawa was the administrative center of the Jaydur nahiya, which was alternatively called 'Nawa' in government records.

In 1884 the American archaeologist Gottlieb Schumacher noted that Nawa was the second largest locality in the Hauran after Daraa, at least terms of its gross area. It had 300 dwellings, mostly constructed of reused ancient basaltic blocks and without mortar, many having timber roofs supplied by recent Circassian settlers from the forests of the northern Jawlan. The homes were generally surrounded by large grounds used by the residents to shelter their sheepflocks. Many of the homes were unoccupied and the total population was between 750 and 800. Nawa's streets were wide and straight and in the center of the village was a large open area set around Ayn al-Ramashta, which at that time measured 14 feet (4.3 m) deep.

Schumacher noted that Nawa had been one of the most populous and important places of the northwestern Hauran since ancient times and was "a village which has been built of ruins, and is surrounded by a great field of them, but yet itself contains hardly anything except modern buildings". The head sheikh of Nawa was Ibrahim al-Midyab, who also held paramountcy among the sheikhs of other villages in the Hauran (a member of his clan, Abdullah al-Midyab controlled the large village of Shajara).

=== Civil war ===
In July 2018, the citizens of Nawa were subject to heavy Syrian government and Russian military bombardment, in an effort to rid the city from its opposition forces such as the Southern Front of the Free Syrian Army.

== Geography ==
Nawa lies in a high valley between the conical hills of Tell al-Jabiya and Tell al-Jumu'a on its west and the Tulul al-Hish volcanic cones to its northeast. The valley on which it lies slopes slightly southward toward the towns of Tasil and al-Shaykh Saad. The grounds to Nawa's north and east are stony, while to its south the soils are higher quality. In the historical center of Nawa is a pool called Ayn al-Ramashta. A second nearby spring is located at the foot of Tell al-Jabiya. Both historically supplied the town at least through Ottoman times.

== Religious buildings ==
- The Grand Imam al-Nawawi Mosque
- The Old Al-Omari Mosque (also known as the Stone Mosque)
- Khalid ibn al-Walid Mosque
- Omar ibn al-Khattab Mosque
- Al-Sadiq Al-Amin Mosque
- Al-Muhammadi Mosque
- Hudhayfah ibn al-Yaman Mosque
- Imran ibn Husayn Mosque
- Al-Mustafa Mosque
- Sayyida Aisha Mosque
- Abdullah ibn Rawahah Mosque
- Abdullah ibn Umar ibn al-Khattab Mosque
- Ali ibn Abi Talib Mosque
- Al-Rahman Mosque
- Hamza Bin Abdul Muttalib Mosque
- Al-Iman Prayer Hall (Musalla)
- Bilal Prayer Hall (Musalla)

== Notable people ==
- Ahmad Suwaydani, chief of staff of Syrian Army, 1966–1968
- Tanhuma bar Abba, a Talmudic rabbi, circa 4th century
- Al-Nawawi, a 13th century Islamic scholar

== Bibliography ==
- Bakhit, Muhammad Adnan Salamah (February 1972). The Ottoman Province of Damascus in the Sixteenth Century (PhD). School of Oriental and African Studies, University of London. S2CID 190680221.
- Foss, Clive (1997). "Syria in Transition, A. D. 550–750: An Archaeological Approach". Dumbarton Oaks Papers. 51: 189–269. doi:10.2307/1291765.
- Goodman, Martin (2002). Jews in a Graeco-Roman World. Oxford: Clarendon Press. ISBN 0-19-815078-4.
- Halim, Fachrizal A. (2015). Legal Authority in Premodern Islam: Yahya B Sharaf Al-Nawawi in the Shafi'i School of Law (ebook ed.). Abingdon and New York: Routledge. ISBN 978-1-315-79598-0.
- Hüttenmeister; Reeg (1977). Die antiken Synagogen in Israel ('The Ancient Synagogues in Israel'), Vol. 1 (in German). Wiesbaden: Ludwig Reichert. ISBN 3920153685.
- Hütteroth, W.-D.; Abdulfattah, K. (1977). Historical Geography of Palestine, Transjordan and Southern Syria in the Late 16th Century. Erlanger Geographische Arbeiten, Sonderband 5. Erlangen, Germany: Vorstand der Fränkischen Geographischen Gesellschaft. ISBN 3-920405-41-2.
- Pringle, D. (2013). Pilgrimage to Jerusalem and the Holy Land, 1187–1291 (Ebook ed.). Ashgate. ISBN 9781409483113.
- Rosenfeld, Benzion (2010). Chapter Five. Golan, Bashan, Hauran And Transjordan. Brill. pp. 235–257. doi:10.1163/ej.9789004178380.i-322.35. ISBN 978-90-474-4073-4.
- Shahid, Irfan (2002). Byzantium and the Arabs in the Sixth Century, Volume 2, Part 1: Toponymy, Monuments, Historical Geography, and Frontier Studies. Washington, D. C.: Dumbarton Oaks Research Library and Collection. ISBN 0-88402-284-6.
- Schumacher, G. (1886). Across the Jordan: Being an Exploration and Survey of part of Hauran and Jaulan. London: Richard Bentley and Son.
- Le Strange, G. (1890). Palestine Under the Moslems: A Description of Syria and the Holy Land from A.D. 650 to 1500. Committee of the Palestine Exploration Fund.
- Vailhé, Siméon (1911). "Neve". Catholic Encyclopedia. Vol. 10. New York: New Advent.
