= Izraa =

Izraa إِزْرَع Izra
- City
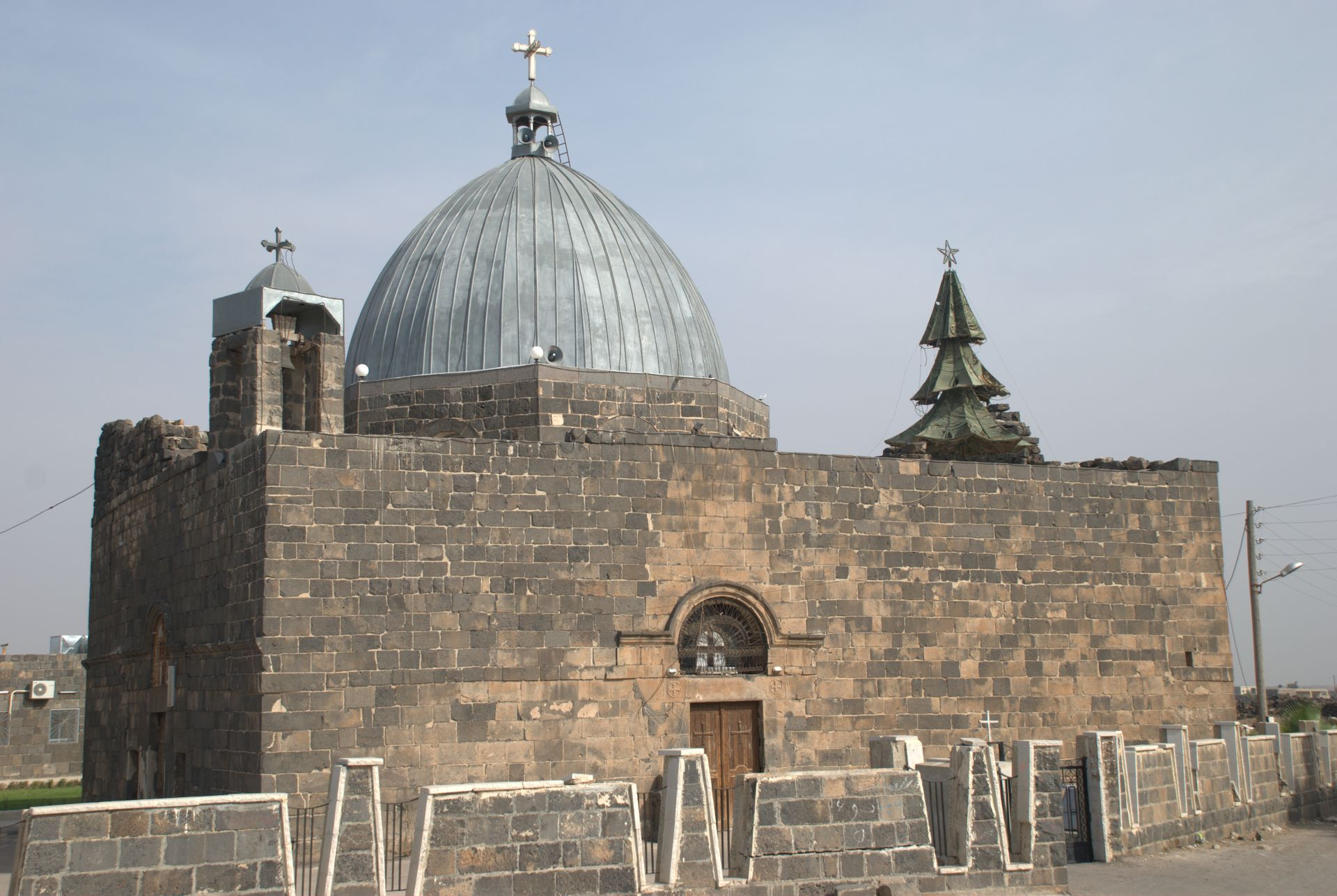
- Basilica of Saint George

- Location within Syria
- Coordinates: 32°51′24″N 36°14′49″E
- Grid position: 267/253
- Country: Syria
- Governorate: Daraa
- District: Izraa
- Subdistrict: Izraa
- Elevation: 599 m (1,965 ft)

Population (2004 census)
  - Total: 19,158
- Time zone: UTC+2 (EET)
  - Summer (DST): UTC+3 (EEST)

Izraa or Izra (Arabic: إِزْرَع, romanized: Izraʿ) is a city in the Daraa Governorate of Syria, to the north of the city of Daraa. It is the administrative centre of the Izraa District, and sits at an altitude of 599 metres. According to the Syria Central Bureau of Statistics (CBS), Izraa had a population of 19,158 in the 2004 census. It is the administrative center of a nahiyah ("subdistrict") consisting of 21 localities with a combined population of 56,760 in the 2004 census. Its inhabitants are predominantly Sunni Muslims, while Christians constitute a large minority.

== History ==
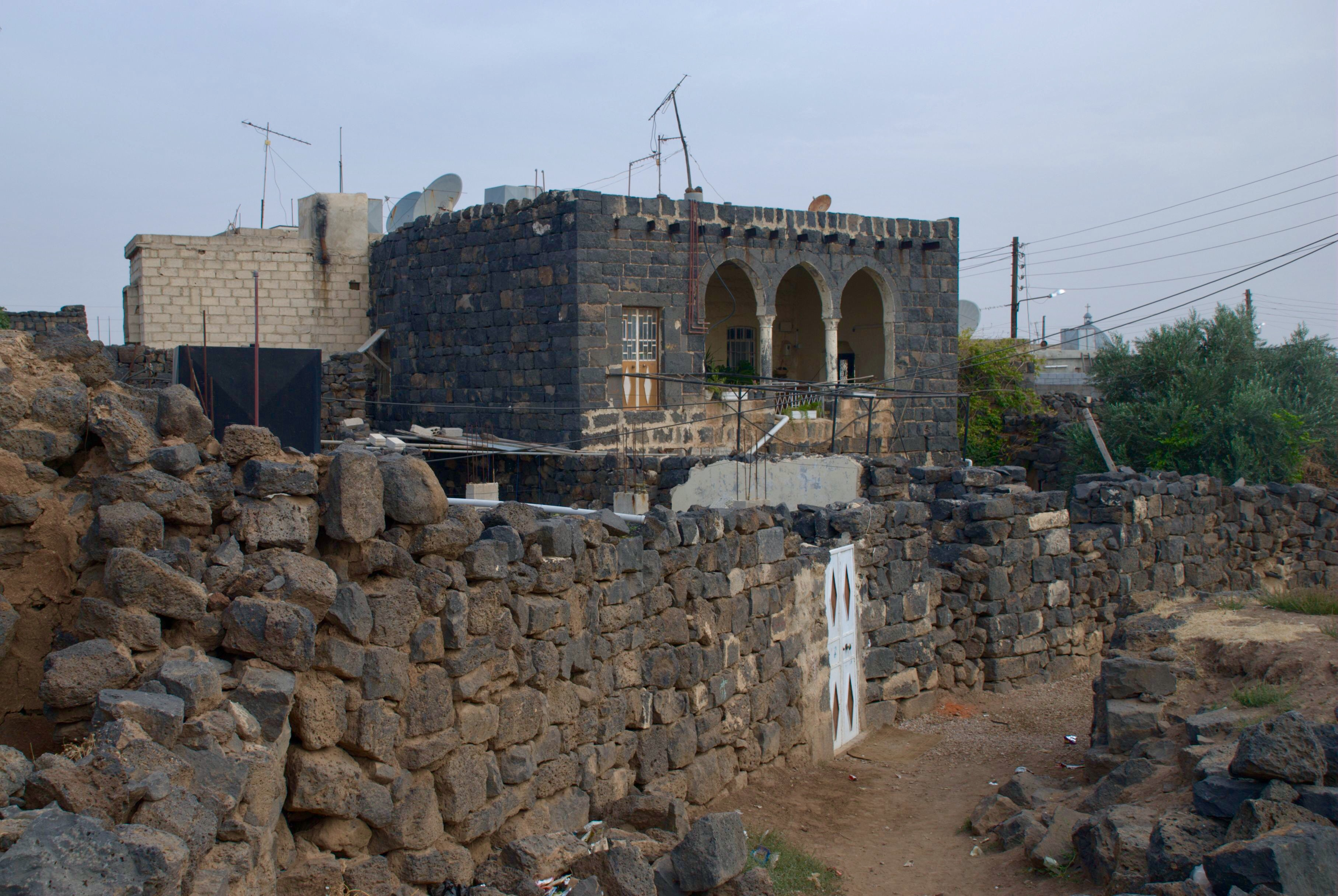
Traditional house in Izraa

Izraa was a Canaanite city mentioned in the Bible as Zorava, Zorowa or Zorabene. Located 80 km south of Damascus in the northern section of the Province of Daraa, its name appears in the Tell Amarna letters, documents which were exchanged between the Egyptian and Syrian rulers in 1334 B.C. Ancient inscriptions left by the Romans after their occupation of the Bashan area evidence the importance of the city.

An inscription found by the archaeologist Richter shows that the city was elevated to the rank of metrocomia (Great city) under the Emperor Severus Alexander (222-235 A.D.) and was known as Zorava.

Lejah (Trachonitis, or "the Rocky Land") forms a triangle with Borac as the northern apex, Izraa in the south-western corner and Shahba in the south-eastern corner. In the course of history, this region was a natural fortress that invaders found very difficult to conquer. Herod's soldiers failed to occupy it. Even the Crusaders under Baldwin III could not subdue it, because of its difficult terrain, the lack of water and the resistance of its people.

The Christian Gospel reached this region early because of its proximity to the Holy Land. It became an episcopal seat during the Byzantine era, and ranked second after the metropolitan see of Bosra throughout the whole of the Province of Arabia.

In 1253, An-Nasir Yusuf ordered the roofing of the Friday mosque in Izraa.

The historian Ismail Abulfida described in his book Taqwim al Buldan that it was “to be one of the major capitals of Hauran, 18 miles from the region of Sanameine”.

=== Ottoman era ===
In 1596, Izraa appeared in the Ottoman tax registers as Madinat Zura' and was part of the nahiya of Badi Sarma in the Qada of Hauran. It had a Christian population consisting of 175 households and 61 bachelors, and a Muslim population of 59 households and 30 bachelors. The villagers paid a fixed tax rate of 40% on various agricultural products, including wheat, barley, goats and/or beehives, in addition to on a water mill and jizya; a total of 124,120 akçe.

In 1838, it was noted (under the name of Edhra‘), located in "the Luhf, west of the Lejah", having Muslim, Greek and Catholic Christian inhabitants.

In 1840, the Egyptian governor Ibrahim Pasha took over the region and bombarded the church, causing great damage to the walls and dome, but failed to occupy the city. During the Great Syrian Revolt against the French Mandate forces (1925-1926), Syrian rebels sought refuge in Izra.

== Geography ==
=== Landscape ===
Izraa can have very strong (vii) earthquakes (on average one every 50 years) with occurrences at 6-7 Richter. When a strong earthquake occurs, it will be difficult to stand and noticed by people driving motor cars. Furniture and glass will be broken. The damage will be negligible in buildings of good design and construction but considerable damage may be inflicted on poorly built or badly designed structures. There is a very high occurrence of periods with extreme drought. Izraa has a semi-arid (0.2 - 0.5 p/pet) climate. The land area is totally cultivated, not much natural vegetation is left. The landscape is mostly covered with mosaic forest - shrubland/grassland. The climate is classified as a mid-latitude steppe (mid-latitude dry), with a subtropical desert scrub biozone. The soil in the area is high in leptosols (lp), a weakly developed shallow soil.

=== Climate ===
Izraa has a cold semi-arid climate (Köppen climate classification: BSk). Rainfall is higher in winter than in summer. The average annual temperature in Izraa is 17.3 °C (63.1 °F). About 287 mm (11.30 in) of precipitation falls annually.

Climate data for Izraa
Month	Jan	Feb	Mar	Apr	May	Jun	Jul	Aug	Sep	Oct	Nov	Dec	Year
Mean daily maximum °C (°F)	13.1 (55.6)	14.8 (58.6)	18.2 (64.8)	23.0 (73.4)	28.4 (83.1)	31.9 (89.4)	33.0 (91.4)	33.5 (92.3)	32.0 (89.6)	28.3 (82.9)	21.8 (71.2)	15.1 (59.2)	24.4 (76.0)
Mean daily minimum °C (°F)	2.9 (37.2)	3.4 (38.1)	5.8 (42.4)	8.7 (47.7)	12.1 (53.8)	15.0 (59.0)	17.1 (62.8)	17.4 (63.3)	15.3 (59.5)	12.1 (53.8)	8.0 (46.4)	4.4 (39.9)	10.2 (50.3)
Average precipitation mm (inches)	65 (2.6)	58 (2.3)	49 (1.9)	16 (0.6)	6 (0.2)	0 (0)	0 (0)	0 (0)	0 (0)	7 (0.3)	27 (1.1)	59 (2.3)	287 (11.3)
Source: Climate-Data.org, Climate data

== Demographics ==
The city had a population of 19,158 in the 2004 census. The majority of residents are Sunni Muslim, while Christians constitute a large minority, mainly belonging to the Greek Orthodox and Melkite Greek Catholic churches. Izraa contains two still-functional Byzantine-era churches, the Greek Orthodox St. George Church (locally referred to as “Khudr Izraa”) and the Greek Catholic St. Elias Church. The former was built in 515 and is the oldest, functioning church in Syria.

In 2011, the Melkite Greek Catholic Church had approximately 4,300 believers.

== Religious buildings ==
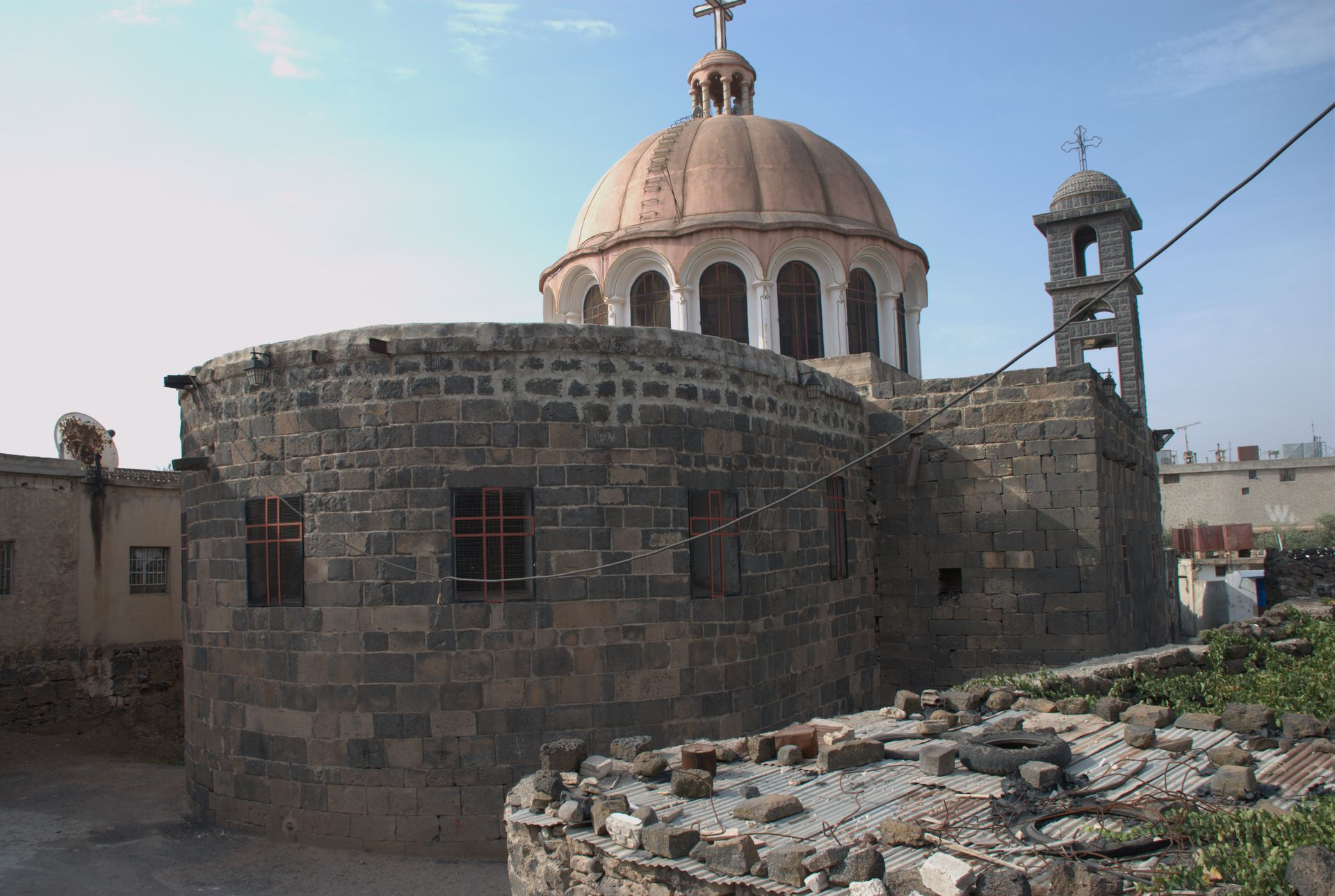
St. Elias (St. Elijah) Church

- St. George Greek Orthodox Church
- St. Elias (St. Elijah) Melkite Greek Catholic Church
- St. Nicholas Melkite Greek Catholic Church (Al-Mahatta Church)
- Monastery of St. John the Baptist (abandoned)
- Khalid ibn al-Walid Mosque
- Al-Adnan Mosque
- Omar ibn al-Khattab Mosque
- Khalid ibn al-Walid Mosque
- Musab ibn Umayr Mosque
- Uthman ibn Affan Mosque
- Al-Buqaah Mosque
- Abu Bakr al-Siddiq Mosque (formerly known as the Bassel al-Assad Mosque)

== See also ==
- Christians in Syria

== Bibliography ==
- Hütteroth, W.-D.; Abdulfattah, K. (1977). Historical Geography of Palestine, Transjordan and Southern Syria in the Late 16th Century. Erlanger Geographische Arbeiten, Sonderband 5. Erlangen, Germany: Vorstand der Fränkischen Geographischen Gesellschaft. ISBN 3-920405-41-2.
- Piccirillo, M. [in Italian] (2002). Arabie chrétienne : Archéologie et histoire (in French). Editions Mengès. ISBN 2856204252.
- Porter, J.L. (1855). Five years in Damascus: including an account of the history, topography, and antiquities of that city : with travels and researches in Palmyra, Lebanon, and the Hauran. Vol. 2. John Murray.
- Robinson, E.; Smith, E. (1841). Biblical Researches in Palestine, Mount Sinai and Arabia Petraea: A Journal of Travels in the year 1838. Vol. 3. Boston: Crocker & Brewster.
- Sartre, M. (1985). Bostra: des origines à l'Islam (in French). Paris: Librairie Orientaliste Paul Geuthner. ISBN 2705302700.
- Sartre, M. (1991). L'Orient romain (in French). Éditions du Seuil. ISBN 2020127059.
- Sharon, M. (2007). Corpus Inscriptionum Arabicarum Palaestinae, Addendum. BRILL. ISBN 978-90-04-15780-4.
