= Hauran Sanjak =

Sanjak in Ottoman Syria

Hauran Sanjak Havrân Sancağı
- sanjak of the Ottoman Empire under Damascus Eyalet (16th century–1865) under Damascus Vilayet (1865–1918)
- 16th century–1918 (Armistice of Mudros)
- Coat of arms
- Capital: Daraa
- History
  - Established: 16th century
  - Dissolved: 1918 (Armistice of Mudros)
Succeeded by
Occupied Enemy Territory Administration
- Today part of: Syria; Jordan

The Hauran Sanjak (Turkish: Havrân Sancağı, Arabic: سنجق حوران) was a sanjak of the Ottoman Empire, spanning the southern areas of Ottoman Syria, located in modern-day Syria and Jordan. The city of Daraa was the sanjak's capital. The sanjak had a population of 182,805 in 1914.

== Subdistricts ==
=== 16th century ===
As a sanjak of Damascus Eyalet in the 16th century, the Qada (Kaza) of Hauran consisted of the following 14 nahiyes:

- Jaydur, centered at Nawa
- Banu Kilab
- Banu Muqlid
- Banu Malik al-Ashraf, centered at Namir
- Banu Nashba
- Banu Hilal
- Jawlan al-Gharbi
- Banu Abdullah
- Banu Malik al-Sadir
- Banu Atika
- Banu Kinana
- Banu Jahma
- Banu al-A'sar
- Banu Uqba

=== Post-1865 ===
As a sanjak of the Syria Vilayet, the sanjak was made up of eight kazas (first-level districts), some of which were further subdivided into nahiyes (second-level districts):

- Shaykh Maskin (Şeyh Miskin)
  - Ghabaghib (Gabağab)
  - Jasim (Casim)
- Daraa (Der'a)
  - Bosra (Eski Şam)
- Ajlun (Aclun)
  - Kufranjah (Küfrence)
  - Kura (Küre)
- Jabal al-Druze, Markaz Suwayda (Cebel-i Dürüz, Merkez Süvediye)
  - Busan
- Quneitra (Kuneytira)
  - Majdal Shams (Mecdel-i Șams)
  - Jawlan (Cülân)
  - Zawiye (Zevye)
- Busra al-Harir (Busru'l-Harir)
- Salkhad (Salhad)
- Ahiqa (Âhire)
  - Shahba (Șehbâ)

== Bibliography ==
- Bakhit, Muhammad Adnan Salamah (February 1972). The Ottoman Province of Damascus in the Sixteenth Century (PhD). School of Oriental and African Studies, University of London. S2CID 190680221.
- 401 Numaralı Şam Livâsı mufassal Tahrîr Defteri (942/1535)
