= Ash-Shaykh Miskin =

ash-Shaykh Miskin الشيخ مسكين al-Sheikh Miskin
- City
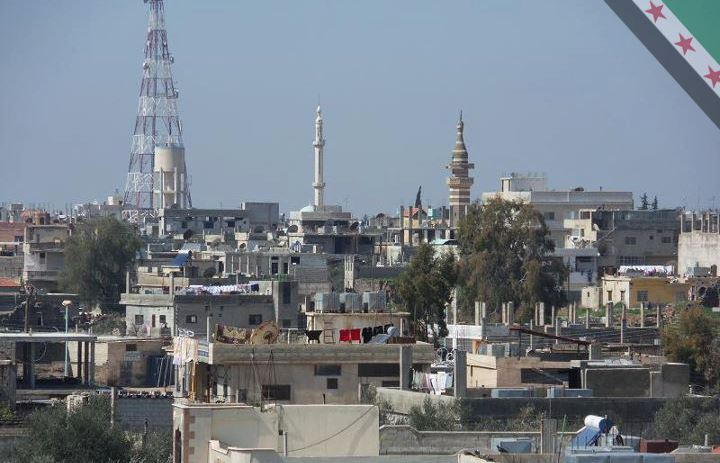
- ash-Shaykh Miskin, Nov. 2012

- Location within Syria
- Coordinates: 32°49′42″N 36°9′31.5″E
- Grid position: 258/248 PAL
- Country: Syria
- Governorate: Daraa
- District: Izraa
- Subdistrict: Shaykh Miskin

Population (2004 census)
  - Total: 24,057
- Time zone: UTC+2 (EET)
  - Summer (DST): UTC+3 (EEST)

Ash-Shaykh Miskin (Arabic: الشيخ مسكين, romanized: Al-Sheikh Meskīn, also spelled Sheikh Miskin or Sheikh Meskin) is a city in southern Syria, administratively part of the Daraa Governorate, located north of Daraa. Nearby localities include Ibta' and Da'el to the south, Khirbet al-Ghazaleh to the southeast, Izraa to the northeast, Nawa to the northwest and ash-Shaykh Saad to the west. According to the Syria Central Bureau of Statistics (CBS), ash-Shaykh Miskin had a population of 24,057 in the 2004 census. It is the administrative center of a nahiyah ("subdistrict") consisting of six localities with a combined population of 34,370 in the 2004 census. Its inhabitants are predominantly Sunni Muslims.

== Etymology ==
Clermont-Ganneau proposed that the city’s name originated from the phrase “the leper Sheikh,” referring to the Biblical figure Job.

== History ==
=== Roman and Byzantine periods ===
Ash-Shaykh Miskin has been identified as the ancient Roman-era site of "Neapolis." By the 4th century, Neapolis had developed into a city.

A church was consecrated there in 517, during Byzantine rule. In his short article in the Catholic Encyclopedia of 1911, Siméon Vailhé reported that many authorities at that time thought that Ash-Shaykh Miskin might be the site of the ancient city and bishopric of Maximianopolis in Arabia, although its identification with nearby Shaqqa is accepted today.

=== Ottoman period ===
The Ottoman Empire annexed the region in 1516. During this period, ash-Shaykh Miskin was settled by local Bedouin tribesmen and benefited from the annual hajj pilgrimage to Mecca by supplying pilgrim caravans with camels for transportation. In 1596, ash-Shaykh Miskin appeared in the Ottoman tax registers as Samsakin and was part of the nahiya of Bani Malik al-Asraf in the Qada Hawran. It had an entirely Muslim population consisting of 56 households and 17 bachelors. A fixed tax rate of 40% was paid on wheat, barley, summer crops, goats and/or beehives; a total of 17,250 akçe. 1/3 of the revenue went to a waqf.

In 1838, ash-Shaykh Miskin was noted as being in the Nukrah district, with a Sunni Muslim population.

In the 1850s ash-Shaykh Miskin contained about 100 houses and all of its inhabitants were Muslims. The town's chief commodity during the 19th-century was grain, which it exported locally. Timber and cloth were the principal imports. Goods traffic was concentrated in the town's railway station which also served all the villages between ash-Shaykh Miskin and the Lajat region. The town grew considerably between 1891 and 1900. The town hosted the administrative offices of Hauran's local government in the latter half of this century. The population was "exclusively Muslim" according to John Murray.

Its sheikh (chief) was Ahmed al-Hariri, also known as Ahmed al-Turk, who served as the Sheikh Mashayikh al-Hauran ("chief of chiefs of the Hauran"). His tribe claimed descent from the family of the Islamic prophet Muhammad and were thus known as sharifs. In the wake of the 1860 confrontations between the region's Druze and Christians, Sheikh Ahmed al-Turk led a force of 200 tribesmen to Daraa, rescued more than 500 Christians in that town from an impending attack by the Druze of the Lajat who his forces routed. He subsequently notified all the tribal chiefs of the area to spare the Christians living in the towns under his authority, to which all the tribes conformed.

In 1895, ash-Shaykh Miskin became a refuge for the residents of some dozen villages in the Hawran destroyed by Druze fighters in response to an Ottoman decree ordering the conscription of Druze men into the Ottoman Army. Ottoman troops mobilized at ash-Shaykh Miskin in preparation of the conscription expedition against the Druze which was launched from the town on 15 October. Vital Cuinet wrote in 1896 that ash-Shaykh Miskin's population of 800 included 400 Muslims and 400 Greek Orthodox Christians. Gottlieb Schumacher described it in 1897 as "large and prosperous".

=== Civil War ===
The city came under rebel control as a result of the battle of ash-Shaykh Miskin at the end of 2014.

==== Second Battle of Ash-Shaykh Miskin ====
Map of the battle for ash-Shaykh Miskin

Early on 27 December, the 15th Brigade of the 5th Armoured Division of the Syrian Army launched the operation to capture ash-Shaykh Miskin, attacking its northern and eastern flanks. Over the following two days, the Russian air force conducted over 80 airstrikes on the city.

On 29 December, the Army captured the Brigade 82 military base, on the outskirts of ash-Shaykh Miskin, as well as the northern part of the city itself. Government forces then temporarily lost the base due to bad weather, but retook it again overnight. The following day, government forces continued with their attempts to take full control of ash-Shaykh Miskin and captured the eastern part of the city. This left them in control of half of ash-Shaykh Miskin. They reached the city's main square, as well as the Al-'Umari Mosque (north of the city center), while the rebels issued a distress call for reinforcements. The Army's advances were supported by another 15 Russian airstrikes.

Further attempts by the Army to advance were made between 2 and 4 January, as 43 more Russian airstrikes hit the city.

==== Failed rebel counter-attack ====
On 5 January, the rebels launched a counter-attack towards the Brigade 82 base. At the same time, the 15th Brigade, supported by NDF units, continued making attempts to advance to Tal Hamad hill, west of the city, but were unsuccessful. By this point, the military was in control of 55–60% of ash-Shaykh Miskin. By the evening, the rebel counter-attack stalled. The next day, the rebels renewed their counter-assault and stormed the southern perimeter of the Brigade 82 headquarters. However, eventually, this second assault failed as well. The Russian Air Force conducted 12 air-strikes throughout the day.

A third unsuccessful rebel assault was launched on the morning of 8 January, against the walls of the Brigade 82 Housing Facility. Rebel fighters were hampered by poor weather, fierce resistance and Russian airstrikes. Opposition sources confirmed that since the start of the battle for ash-Shaykh Miskin the rebels had suffered ”major material and human losses", but reported they were still preparing to make new attempts to regain the base.

==== The Syrian Army captures ash-Shaykh Miskin ====
Between 9 and 10 January, 33 airstrikes were conducted against ash-Shaykh Miskin.

On 11 January, government forces captured a total of 17 buildings in the southern part of the city and two days later, another 35 buildings, thus seizing the southern part of the city, and leaving them in control of 80 percent of ash-Shaykh Miskin.

Between 23 and 24 January, the military captured Al-Zaheriyah school and its surrounding area, as well as the town of Al-Burj on the outskirts of ash-Shaykh Miskin, after more than 40 airstrikes were conducted. However, the rebels were able to recapture the school. Still, Army advances continued as they took control of more positions in the town, which included the Al-Bassam Mosque, parts of the Al-Diri neighborhood and large sections of the Saydaliyat road.

During the night before 25 January, when the final Army assault was supposed to commence, a military detachment was sent to capture a height overlooking the city, from which the rebels could detect the military's planned attack from the north of the city. The fighting was heavy, but a heavy rain helped the Army unit climb up the height without being detected. The unit was then attacked from three sides, during which its commander, Mohammed Fares, was wounded. The detachment managed to hold the height until reinforcements arrived.

The next morning, the Syrian Army launched its operation from the north side of the city and rapidly advanced, linking up with troops coming in from the east. The fighting started 08:30 am, and shortly thereafter the SAA's 15th Brigade captured the Al-'Umari Mosque. The military made gains in the northwestern neighborhood of ash-Shaykh Miskin, as well as other parts of the city, while they were covered by 25 airstrikes. The heaviest fighting of the day took place in the Al-Diri District. However, after seizing Al-Diri, the rebels were left with only two building blocks under their control. The Army's advances also enabled them to monitor all roads leading from the city to other nearby areas. Many rebels started withdrawing from the city, mainly towards Ibta' and Nawa. By 10:30 pm, the military had cleared ash-Shaykh Miskin of all rebel resistance. By the end of the battle, 70% of the city had been rendered uninhabitable.

== Religious buildings ==
- Omar ibn al-Khattab Mosque (Al-Omari/Al-Umari Mosque/Stone Mosque)
- Ali ibn Abi Talib Mosque
- Abu Bakr al-Siddiq Mosque
- Al-Noor Mosque
- Khalid ibn al-Walid Mosque
- Al-Bassam Mosque
- Mother of the Believers (formerly known as the Mosque of the Greatest Prophet)
- Rahman Mosque
- Mosque of the Companions
- Al-Nasir Salah al-Din Mosque
- Al-Iman Mosque
- Abi Dhar al-Ghifari Prayer Hall (Musalla)
- City Prayer Hall (Musalla)

== Bibliography ==
- Clermont-Ganneau, C.S. (1902). "Archæological and epigraphic notes on Palestine". Quarterly Statement - Palestine Exploration Fund. 34: 10–27.
- Butcher, Kevin (2003). Roman Syria and the Near East. Getty Publications. ISBN 0892367156.
- Firro, Kais (1992). A History of the Druzes. Vol. 1. BRILL. ISBN 9004094377.
- Hütteroth, W.-D.; Abdulfattah, K. (1977). Historical Geography of Palestine, Transjordan and Southern Syria in the Late 16th Century. Erlanger Geographische Arbeiten, Sonderband 5. Erlangen, Germany: Vorstand der Fränkischen Geographischen Gesellschaft. ISBN 3-920405-41-2.
- Lancaster, W. (1999). People, Land and Water in the Arab Middle East: Environments and Landscapes in the Bilâd Ash-Shâm. Taylor & Francis. ISBN 9057023229.
- Porter, J.L. (1858). A Handbook for Travellers in Syria and Palestine. Vol. 1. Murray.
- Royal Geographical Society (1862). The Journal of the Royal Geographical Society of London. Vol. 32. J. Murray.
- Schumacher, G. (1897). "Der Südliche Basan". Zeitschrift des Deutschen Palästina-Vereins. 19–20: 65–227.
- Smith, G.A. (1901). "Notes on a journey through Hauran, with inscriptions found by the way". Quarterly Statement - Palestine Exploration Fund. 33 (4): 340–361. doi:10.1179/peq.1901.33.4.340.
- Walter, Christopher (2003). The Warrior Saints in Byzantine Art and Tradition. Ashgate Publishing, Ltd. ISBN 184014694X.
