= Daraa Governorate =

Daraa Governorate مُحافظة درعا
- Governorate
- Map of Syria with Daraa highlighted
- Interactive map of Daraa Governorate
- Coordinates (Daraa): 32.9°N 36.2°E
- Country: Syria
- Capital: Daraa
- Manatiq (Districts): 3

Government
  - Governor: Anwar al-Zoubi

Area
  - Total: 3,730 km^{2} (1,440 sq mi)

Population (2011)
  - Total: 1,027,000
  - Density: 275/km^{2} (713/sq mi)
- Time zone: UTC+3 (AST)
- ISO 3166 code: SY-DR
- Main language(s): Arabic
- Website: daraa.gov.sy

Daraa Governorate (Arabic: مُحافظة درعا, romanized: Muḥāfaẓat Darʿā) is one of the fourteen governorates (provinces) of Syria. It is situated in the south-west of the country and covers an area of 2594 km^{2}. It is bordered by Jordan to the south, Quneitra Governorate and Golan Heights to the west, Rif Dimashq Governorate to the north and Suwayda Governorate to the east. The capital is the city of Daraa.

The governorate had a population of 843,478 in the 2004 census. Several clashes have occurred within the governorate throughout the Syrian civil war.

== History ==
=== Civil War (2011–2024) ===
==== Protests and subsequent clashes (2011–2012) ====
Civilians in Daraa began protesting against the Assad government's authoritarian practices, which later prompted similar protests across the country. The Syrian government responded by besieging the city, which prompted some protesters to arm themselves. The escalating tensions eventually lead to the creation of the Free Syrian Army on 29 July 2011 by defectors from the Syrian army. Several smaller rebel groups were also created by protesters, which operated under the umbrella of the larger Free Syrian Army.

==== Daraa contested by Syrian government and rebels (2012–2018) ====
The Syrian government would begin an intense shelling of Daraa on 16 February 2012 in response to the Free Syrian Army aiding protesters. The Syrian army would later attack parts of the city with anti-aircraft guns in response to the Free Syrian Army reportedly controlling one district of Daraa, bordering Jordan. By February 2014, the strongest opposition faction fighting in the Daraa governorate would be the Southern Front, which is a loose series of military alliances.

Various offensives between 2013–2015 would see the Syrian rebels gain territory until 25 June 2015, where the Syrian army would wage their first successful offensive against the rebels. This was shortly thereafter followed by a second successful offensive, capturing the city of Ash-Shaykh Maskin. This would later be followed by a successful offensive by rebel forces, recapturing parts of Daraa. After several ceasefires and minor offensives, the Syrian army launched a successful offensive to retake most of the rebel-controlled territory in Daraa. This was followed by a major insurgency between 23 November 2018 and 5 September 2021, with a minor insurgency following it. Due to the weakened state of rebel forces, several groups accepted reconciliation talks with the Syrian government.

==== ISIL Presence in Southern Daraa (2016–present) ====
An offensive by two groups allegedly associated with the Islamic State (ISIS) would see a cell established around the settlement of Nahj, roughly 9 km away from the capital of Daraa. The Free Syrian Army would later recapture most of the lost territory, with ISIS-affiliated forces remaining in the Yarmouk Valley on the border with Jordan. On 20 February 2017, ISIS launched a successful offensive to capture Tasil. ISIS would remain there until the Syrian army launched an offensive to retake territory from both ISIS and other rebels. As of today, ISIS presence in Daraa is weak, with it only executing sporadic attacks.

==== Lesser fighting and sporadic reconciliation efforts (2018–2024) ====
After the offensive which put most of southern Syria back into the Syrian army's control, several rebel forces would accept reconciliation talks. However, these reconciliation talks would restart several times due to clashes between rebel forces and the Syrian army. The March 2020 Daraa clashes resulted in a return to the status quo, with the 2021 Daraa offensive resulting in the Syrian government recapturing Daraa city.

==== Rebel resurgence (2024) ====
The Southern Front launched an offensive on 29 November 2024 to capture the entire Daraa governorate. On the 6 December 2024, the Southern Front announced a military alliance with various Druze rebel groups, creating the Southern Operations Room. As of the 8 December 2024, the Southern Operations Room fully controlled Daraa Governorate.

=== Continued hostilities (2024-present) ===
==== Israeli invasion (2024-present) ====
On 8 December 2024, Israeli soldiers crossed into the UN-buffer zone in violation of the 1974 Agreement on Disengagement between Israel and Syria, invading the Quneitra and Daraa governorates. Israeli Army Radio cited a need to strengthen its border with Syria as justification for the invasion, and claiming that the agreement reached under the Assad regime was no longer in affect. On 23 February 2025, Israeli Prime Minister Benjamin Netanyahu demand the complete demilitarization of southern Syria in the provinces of Daraa, Quneitra and Suweyda, and the withdrawal of Syrian forces from Syrian territory south of Damascus.

==== Clashes with Assad Loyalists (2025) ====
Clashes broke out on 4 March 2025 between the then-newly-appointed Syrian caretaker government and Assad loyalists in the city of As-Sanamayn. Clashes had died down by 6 March with the victory of the caretaker government.

== Governance ==
=== Districts ===
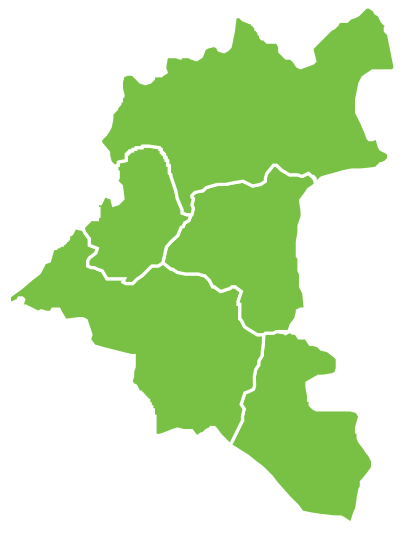

The governorate is divided into three districts (manatiq). The districts are further divided into 17 sub-districts (nawahi):

- Daraa District (8 sub-districts)
  - Daraa Subdistrict
  - Bosra Subdistrict
  - Khirbet Ghazaleh Subdistrict
  - Al-Shajara Subdistrict
  - Da'el Subdistrict
  - Muzayrib Subdistrict
  - Al-Jiza Subdistrict
  - Al-Musayfirah Subdistrict
- Izraa District (6 sub-districts)
  - Izraa Subdistrict
  - Jasim Subdistrict
  - Al-Hirak Subdistrict
  - Nawa Subdistrict
  - Ash-Shaykh Miskin Subdistrict
  - Tasil Subdistrict
- As-Sanamayn District (3 sub-districts)
  - As-Sanamayn Subdistrict
  - Al-Masmiyah Subdistrict
  - Ghabaghib Subdistrict

== Cities, towns and villages ==
This list includes all cities, towns and villages with more than 5,000 inhabitants. The population figures are given according to the 2004 official census:

English name	Population	District
Daraa	97,969	Daraa District
Nawa	47,066	Izraa District
Tafas	32,236	Daraa District
Jasim	31,683	Izraa District
Inkhil	31,258	As-Sanamayn District
Da'el	29,408	Daraa District
As-Sanamayn	26,268	As-Sanamayn District
Ash-Shaykh Miskin	24,057	Izraa District
Al-Hirak	20,760	Izraa District
Bosra	19,683	Daraa District
Izraa	19,158	Izraa District
Al-Harra	17,172	As-Sanamayn District
Khirbet Ghazaleh	16,240	Daraa District
Tasil	15,985	Izraa District
Al-Jiza	14,700	Daraa District
Abtaa	14,283	Daraa District
Buser al-Harir	13,315	Izraa District
Muzayrib	12,640	Daraa District
Kafr Shams	12,435	As-Sanamayn District
Al-Ghariyah ash-Sharqiyah	11,945	Daraa District
Ghabaghib	11,802	As-Sanamayn District
Saida	11,215	Daraa District
Al-Karak	10,510	Daraa District
Al-Musayfirah	10,466	Daraa District
Mahajjah	9,982	Izraa District
Al-Ghariyah al-Gharbiyah	9,784	Daraa District
Tell Shihab	9,430	Daraa District
Maaraba	8,988	Daraa District
Al-Yadudah	8,967	Daraa District
Ataman	8,929	Daraa District
Al-Taybah	7,969	Daraa District
Nimer	7,941	Izraa District
Nahtah	7,789	Izraa District
Jabab	7,699	As-Sanamayn District
Umm Walad	7,547	Daraa District
Al-Naimah	7,472	Daraa District
Al-Qenniyah	7,256	As-Sanamayn District
Saham al-Jawlan	6,572	Daraa District
Al-Shajara	6,567	Daraa District
Alma	6,297	Daraa District
Nasib	5,780	Daraa District
Al-Mlaihah al-Gharbiyah	5,454	Izraa District
Deir al-Bukht	5,381	As-Sanamayn District

== See also ==
- Christians in Syria
- Daraa Governorate campaign
