= Izraa District =

District in Syria

Izraa District (Arabic: منطقة إزرع, romanized: minṭaqat Izraʿ) is a district (mintaqah) administratively belonging to Daraa Governorate, Syria. At the 2004 Census it had a population of 246,915. Its administrative centre is the city of Izraa.

== Sub-districts ==
The district of Izraa is divided into six sub-districts, or nawāḥī (population according to 2004 official census):

- Izraa Subdistrict (ناحية إزرع): population 56,760.
- Jasim Subdistrict (ناحية جاسم): population 39,624.
- Hirak Subdistrict (ناحية الحراك): population 40,979.
- Nawa Subdistrict (ناحية نوى): population 57,404.
- Shaykh Miskin Subdistrict (ناحية الشيخ مسكين): population 34,370.
- Tasil Subdistrict (ناحية تسيل): population 17,778.
