= Battle of Bosra =

634 CE conflict between the Rashidun Caliphate and Byzantine Empire

Coordinates: 31°32′N 36°29′E

- Part of the Muslim conquest of Syria (Arab–Byzantine wars)
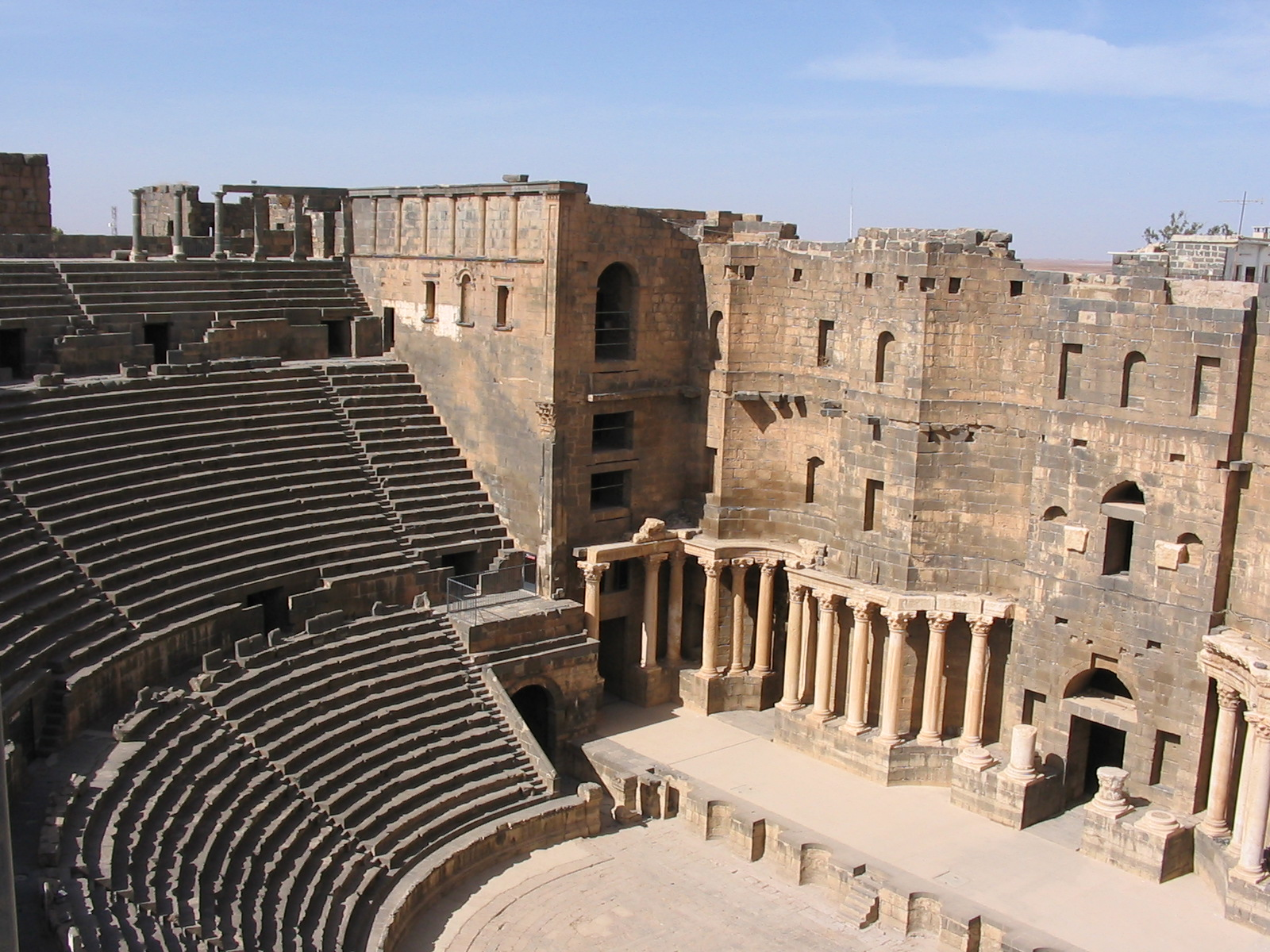
- Roman theatre at Bosra
Date	June–July 634 CE
Location	Bosra, Syria
Result	Rashidun victory

Belligerents
Rashidun Caliphate	Byzantine Empire; Ghassanids

Commanders and leaders
Khalid ibn al-Walid	Heraclius (Indirectly); Romanus

The Battle of Bosra was fought in 634 CE between the Rashidun Caliphate army and the Byzantine Empire over the possession of the city of Bosra, in Syria. The city was one of the Islamic forces' first significant captures and was at the time the capital of the Ghassanids, Arab vassals of the Byzantines. The siege took place between June and July.

== Background and sources ==
Most traditional Islamic accounts place the battle in the year 634 CE, under the caliph Abu Bakr; other sources place it later, with the chronicles of Theophanes the Confessor placing it during the Caliphate of Umar. According to Islamic accounts, including those found in works of al-Baladhuri, four corps under Khalid ibn al-Walid, Abu Ubayda ibn al-Jarrah, Shurahbil ibn Hasana, and Yazid ibn Abi Sufyan gathered together outside the town. After a field engagement in which the Byzantine forces were forced to retreat inside the town, a siege followed, with the town surrendering and agreeing to pay jizya to the caliphate.

The battle was given special significance in later Islamic works, including the epic legend Futuh al-Sham, which presents it as the first Byzantine center conquered by Arabs and a sign of the divine mission of Islam.

== Battle ==
Islamic accounts state that Khalid ibn al-Walid reached the city of Bosra in June of 634 CE, after capturing several Syrian towns. According to his instructions, Abu Ubayda ibn al-Jarrah, who had already occupied the District of Hauran, which lay north-east of the river Yarmuk, was to remain at his position until Khalid arrived at Bosra. Abu Ubayda ibn al-Jarrah had three corps of an army of Muslim soldiers under his command––his own, Yazid's, and Shurahbil's––but had fought no battles and captured no towns. Bosra, a large town and the capital of the Ghassanid Kingdom, contained a force of Byzantine and Christian Arabs, commanded by Roman officers.

While Khalid was in eastern Syria, Abu Ubayda learned that he would serve under Khalid upon the latter's arrival. Upon receiving this news, he sent Shurahbil with 4,000 men to capture Bosra, the garrison of which withdrew into the fortified town as soon as the soldiers appeared in sight. This garrison consisted of 4,000 soldiers who all expected that more Islamic forces would soon arrive and that the Shurahbil detachment was only an advance guard, and remained within the walls of the fort. Shurahbil camped on the western side of the town and positioned groups of his men around the fort.

After two days, as Khalid ibn al-Walid set out on the last day of his march to Bosra, the garrison of Bosra advanced towards the Muslim army outside the city. Shurahbil and the Roman commander held talks with their forces drawn up for battle; the Muslims offered three choices: Islam, tribute, or the sword. When the Byzantines chose the sword, in the middle of the morning, the battle began.

For the first few hours, the fighting continued at a steady pace, with neither side making any headway; but soon after midday, the superior strength of the Romans turned the battle in their favor. The Romans moved forces around both of Shurahbil's flanks and the fighting increased in intensity. The temper of Shurahbil's soldiers became suicidal as the real danger of their position became evident, and they fought with ferocity to avoid encirclement, which appeared to be the Romans' goal. By early afternoon, the Roman wings had moved further forward, and the encirclement of Shurahbil's force became a virtual certainty. Then, suddenly, the combatants became aware of a powerful cavalry force galloping towards the battlefield from the northwest.

Khalid was about a mile from Bosra when he heard the sounds of battle. He immediately ordered the men to horse; as soon as the cavalry was ready, he led it towards the battle field. The Romans withdrew soon after they became aware of the cavalry's arrival. The Muslims under Shurahbil came to regard Khalid's arrival as a miracle.

The next morning, the Byzantine garrison launched another attack. The shock of Khalid's arrival the previous day had now worn off, and seeing that the combined strength of the Muslims was about the same as their own, the Romans attacked again, hoping to defeat the Muslims before they could rest after their lengthy march.

The two armies formed for battle on the plain outside the town. Khalid kept the center of the Rashidun army under his own command, appointing Rafi ibn Amr al-Ta'i as the commander of the right wing and Dirar ibn al-Azwar as the commander of the left wing, with Abd al-Rahman ibn Hanbal al-Jumahi commanding the infantry, Al-Musayyab ibn Najaba leading half of the cavalry, and Madh'ur ibn Adi al-Ijli likely commanding the other half. In front of the center, he placed a thin screen under Abd al-Rahman ibn Abi Bakr. At the very start of the battle, Abd al-Rahman dueled with the Roman army commander and defeated him. As the Roman general fled to the safety of friendly ranks, Khalid launched an attack along the entire front. For some time, the Romans resisted, while the commanders of the Muslim wings played havoc with the opposing wings.

After some fighting, the Byzantine army broke contact and withdrew into the fort. At this time, Khalid was fighting on foot in front of his center. As he turned to give orders for the commencement of the siege, he saw a horseman approaching through the ranks of the Muslims. It was Abu Ubayda ibn al-Jarrah, and with him was a yellow standard that is believed to have belonged to the Islamic prophet Muhammad at the Battle of Khaybar.

The Muslims laid siege to Bosra. There are differing accounts of the events that followed. According to one account, the Byzantine commander lost hope; knowing that most of the available reserves had either moved or were moving to Ajnadayn, he doubted that any help would arrive. After a few days of inactivity, he surrendered the fort. The only condition Khalid ibn al-Walid imposed on Bosra was the payment of the tribute. This surrender took place in the middle of July 634.

== Aftermath ==
Khalid ibn al-Walid wrote to Caliph Abu Bakr, informing him of the progress of his operations since his entry into Syria, and sent one-fifth of the spoils which had been won during the previous few weeks. Hardly had Bosra surrendered when an agent sent by Shurahbil to the region of Ajnadayn returned to inform the Muslims that the concentration of Roman legions was proceeding apace. Soon they would have a vast army of imperial soldiers at Ajnadayn. Khalid ibn al-Walid ordered all the Muslim corps in Syria to concentrate at Ajnadayn and defeated the Byzantine army in the Battle of Ajnadayn.

== Sources ==
- Akram, A. I. (1970). The Sword of Allah: Khalid bin al-Waleed, His Life and Campaigns. Rawalpindi: National Publishing. ISBN 0-7101-0104-X. Archived from the original on 2004-12-10.
- Crawford, Peter (2014-09-16). The War of the Three Gods: Romans, Persians, and the Rise of Islam. Skyhorse Publishing. p. 110. ISBN 978-1629145129.
- al-Azdī, Muḥammad ibn ʻAbd Allāh (2019). Hassanein, Hamada; Scheiner, Jens (eds.). The Early Muslim Conquest of Syria: An English Translation of al-Azdī’s Futūḥ al-Shām. Routledge. ISBN 978-1-000-69058-3.
