= Al-Omari Mosque (Bosra) =

Former mosque in Bosra, Syria

- الْمَسْجِد الْعُمَرِي
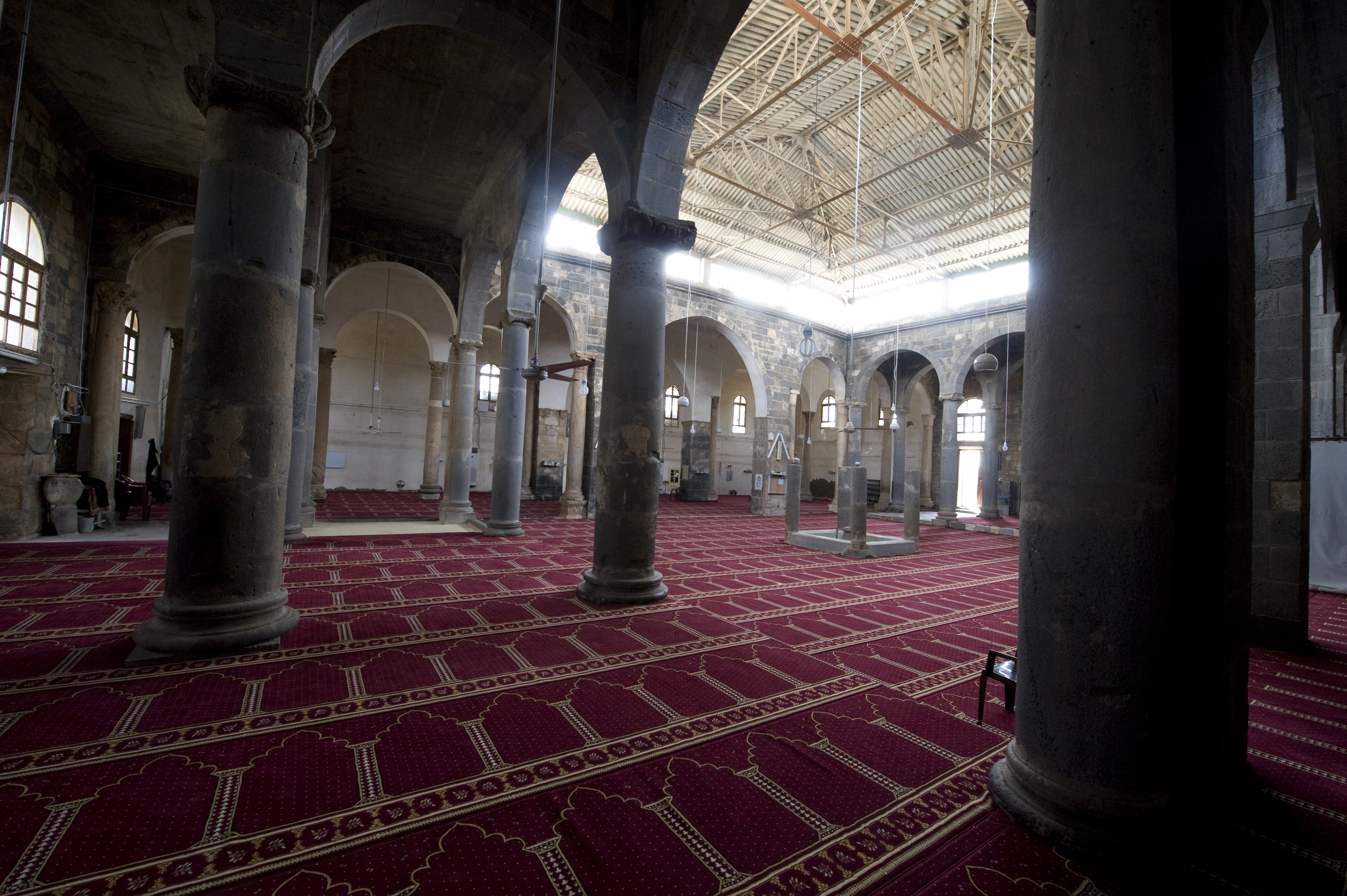
- The mosque in 2009, prior to its partial destruction and later renovations

- Location of the former mosque in Syria

Religion
- Affiliation: Islam
- Ecclesiastical or organisational status: Mosque (636)
- Status: Active (renovated)

Location
- Location: Bosra, Daraa Governorate
- Country: Syria
- Interactive map of Al-Omari Mosque
- Coordinates: 32°31′18″N 36°28′58″E

Architecture
- Type: Islamic architecture
- Style: Umayyad
- Founder: Caliph Umar; Caliph Yazid II
- Completed: 720 CE
- Destroyed: c. 2012 (Damaged in the Syrian civil war)
- Minaret: 1 (destroyed)
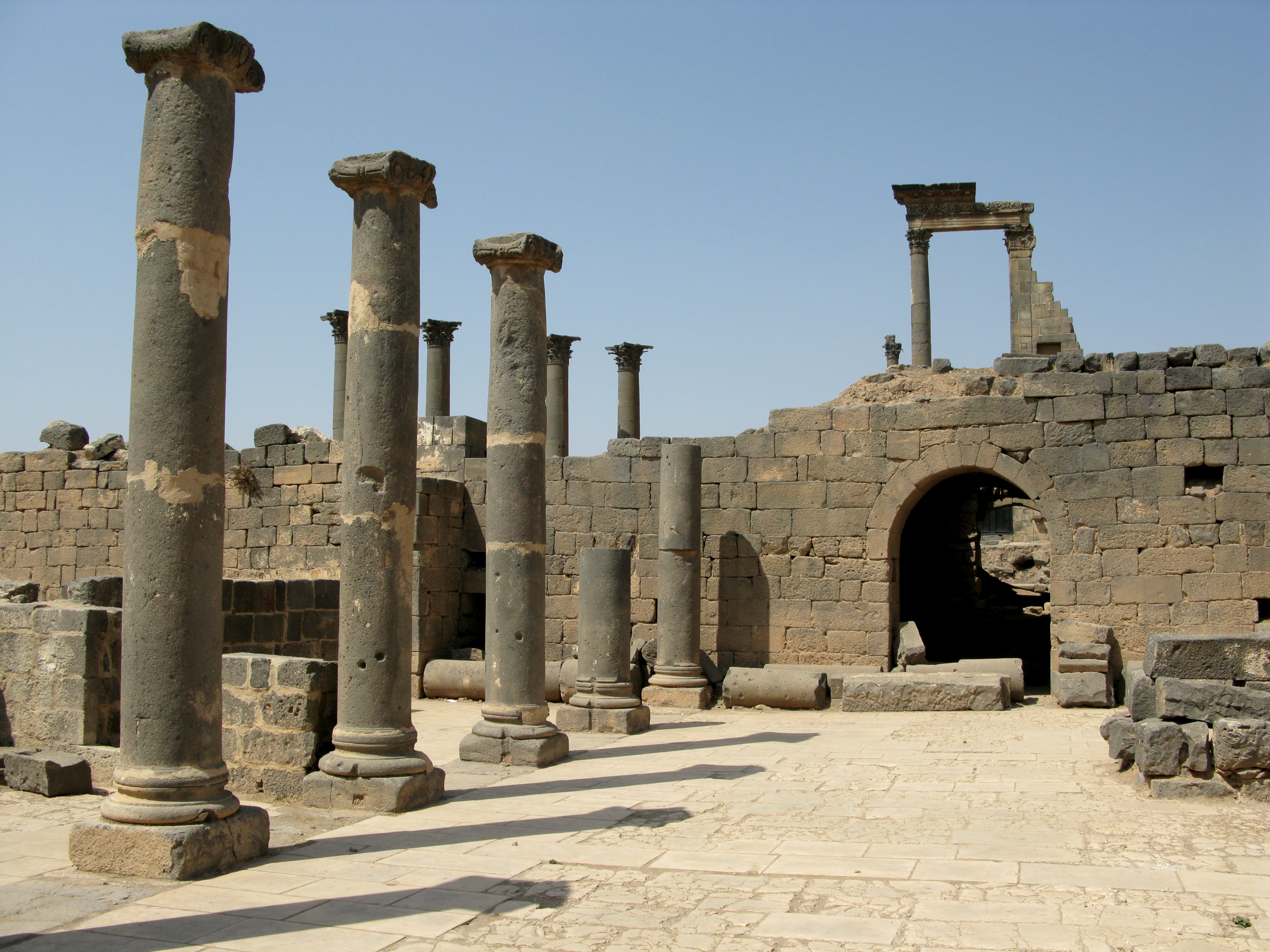
- Ruins in Bosra

UNESCO World Heritage Site
- Official name: Ancient City of Bosra
- Location: Bosra, Syria
- Criteria: Cultural: (i), (iii), (vi)
- Reference: 22
- Inscription: 1980 (4th Session)
- Endangered: 2013–present
- Area: 116.2 ha (287 acres)
- Buffer zone: 200.4 ha (495 acres)
- Coordinates: 32°31′05″N 36°28′54″E

The Al-Omari Mosque of Bosra (Arabic: الْمَسْجِد الْعُمَرِي, romanized: al-Masjid al-ʿUmarīy) is a mosque in the Roman Ancient city of Bosra, Syria, a World Heritage Site. The mosque was founded by Caliph Umar, who led the Muslim conquest of Syria in 636 CE, and it was completed in 720 CE by Caliph Yazid II. The mosque was renovated in the 12th and 13th century CE by the Ayyubid dynasties. The mosque was lightly damaged between 2012 and 2014, during the Syrian civil war. The mosque has been renovated, and is active.

== History ==
The mosque is one of the oldest standing mosques in the world. It served as a rest stop for travelers, Arab caravans on trade routes through Syria and pilgrims traveling to Mecca. The travelers used the central courtyard of the mosque as a marketplace as well as a place to sleep. The arcades of the mosque on the eastern and western sides enclosed this central courtyard. The south side of the mosque had a double arcade that led to the mosque's prayer hall.

The mosque's square minaret was one of the earliest examples of Umayyad-style minarets. Mosques in Damascus and Aleppo have similar style minarets from the same dynasty. This style of minaret was potentially inspired by the steeples of Syrian churches.

Damage to Bosra began in 2012, as shells and tanks caused damage during the Syrian civil war. In 2014, shell crater damage caused a hole in the roof of the mosque. Rubble from the mosque is scattered around the destruction site, and there is shell damage in the surrounding area as well.

== Gallery ==
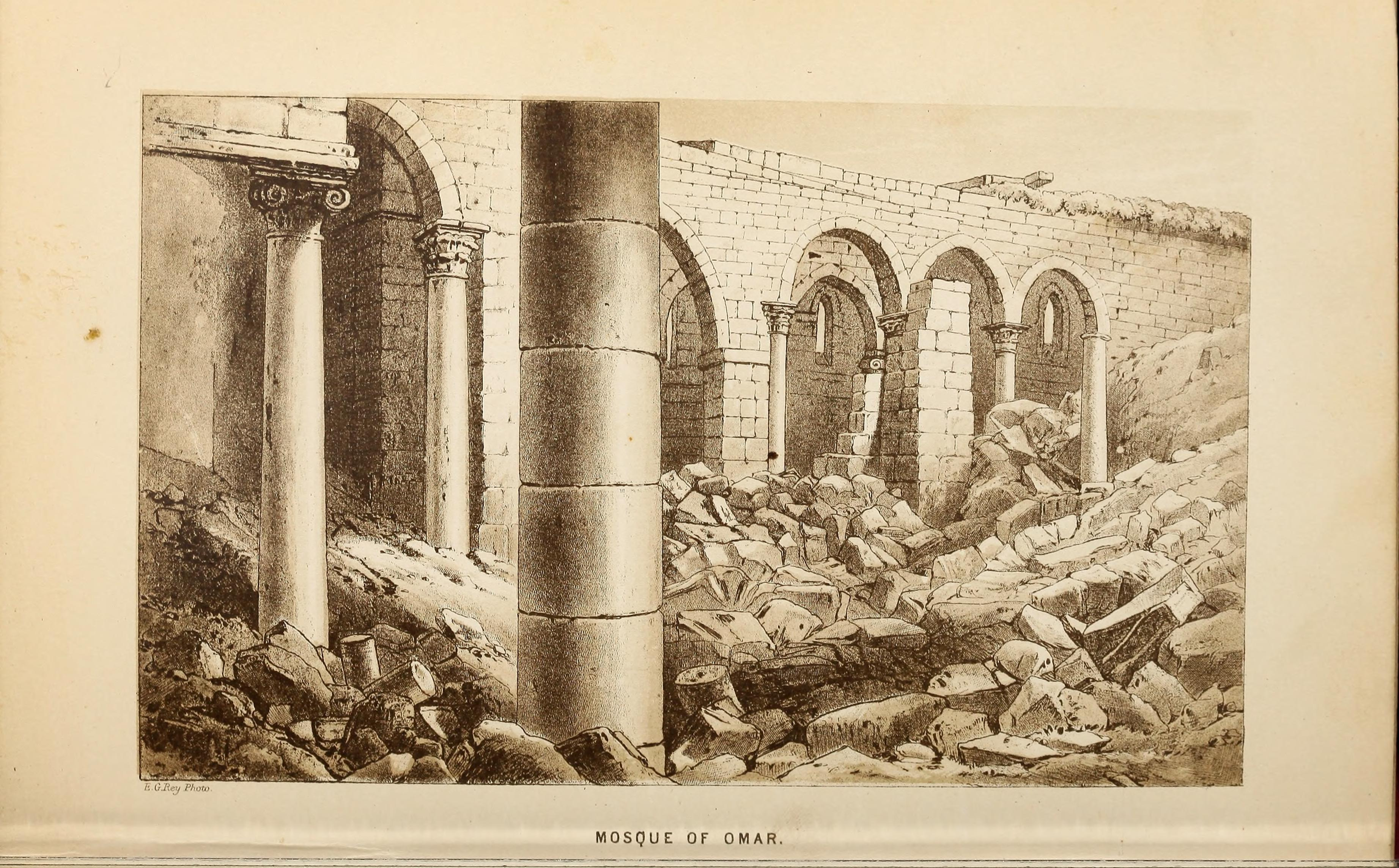
Al-Omari Mosque in J.L.Porter's The Giant Cities of Bashan, 1865

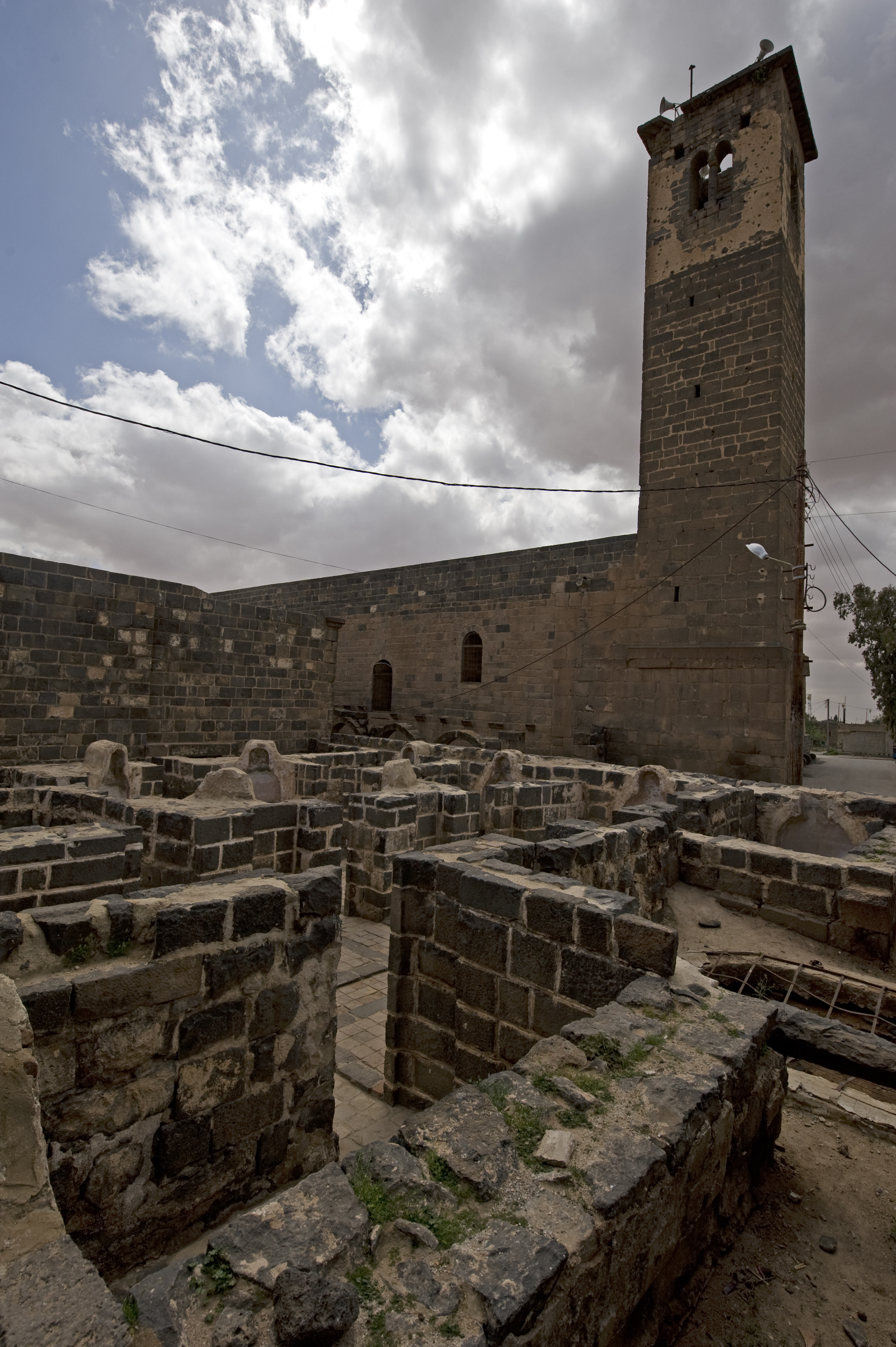
The mosque's square minaret in 2009

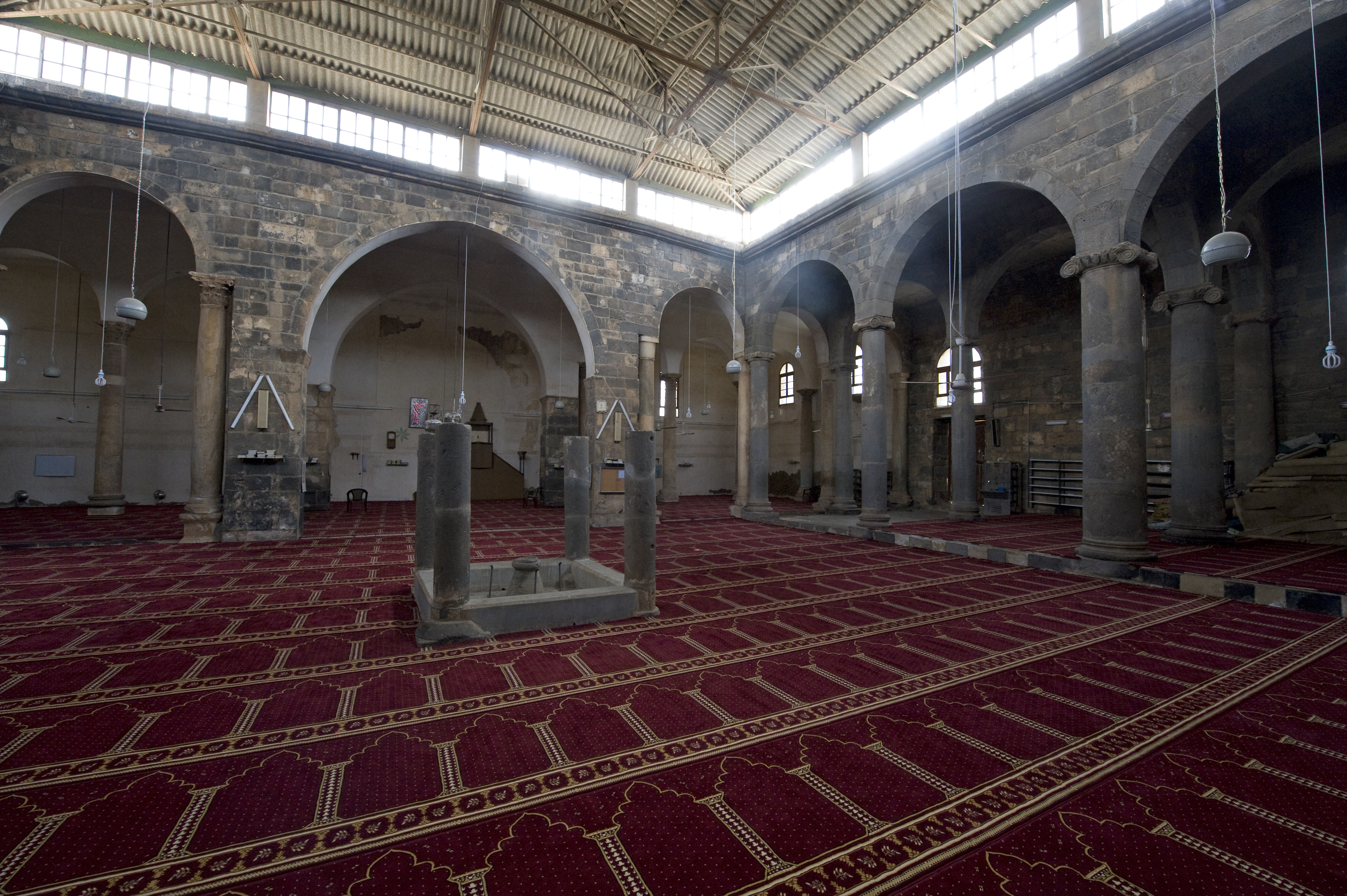
interior

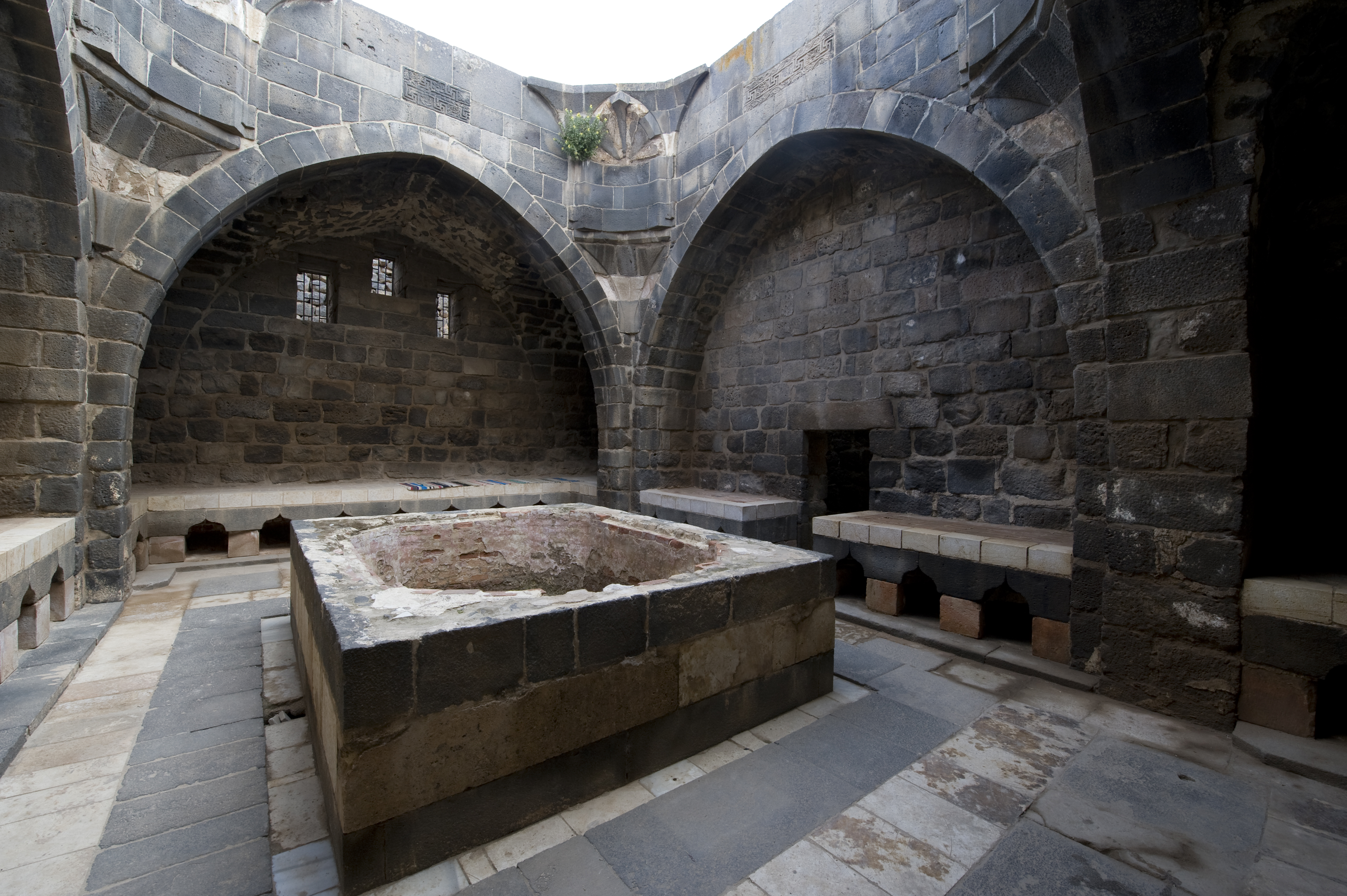
interior

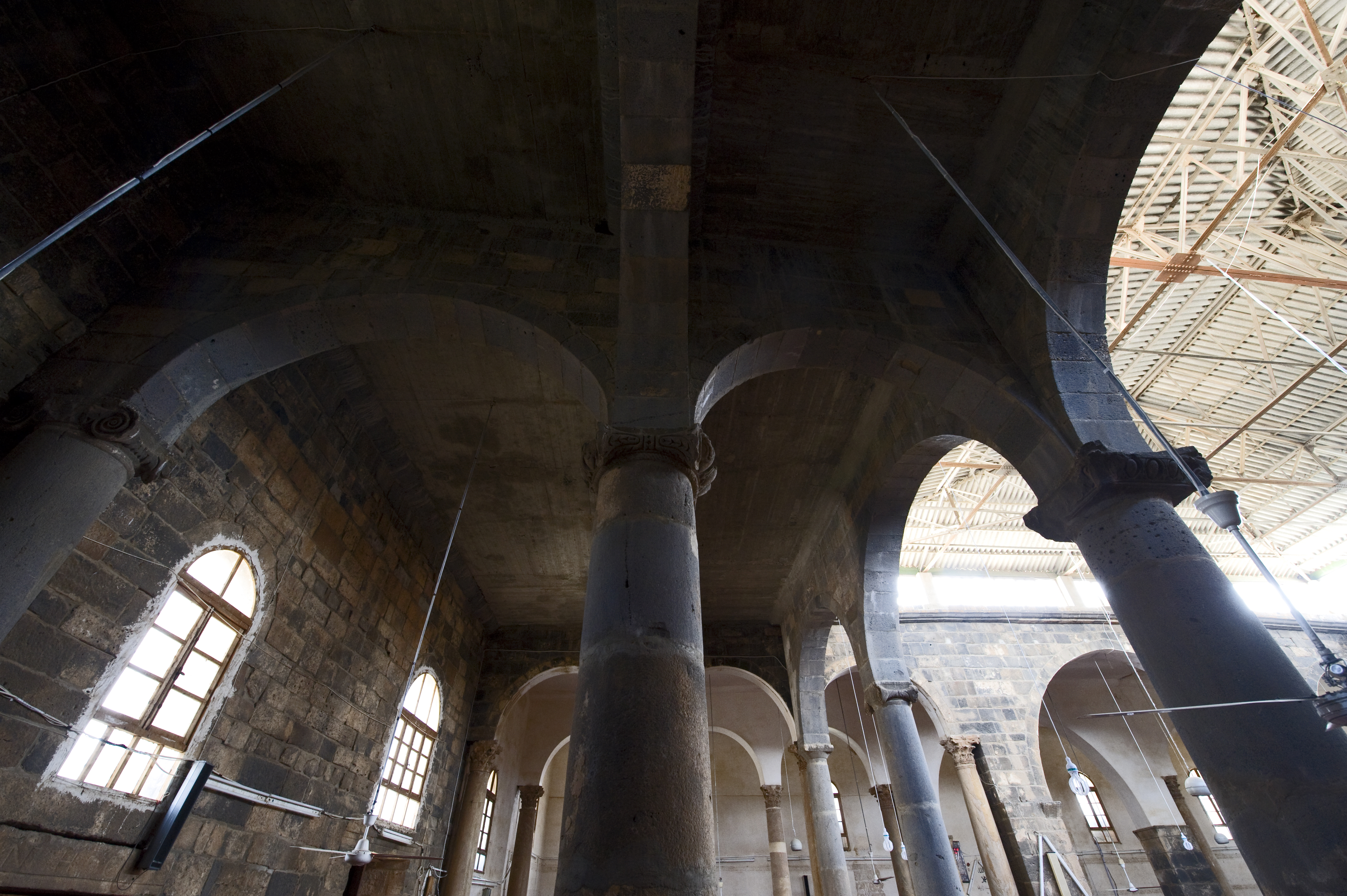
colonnades

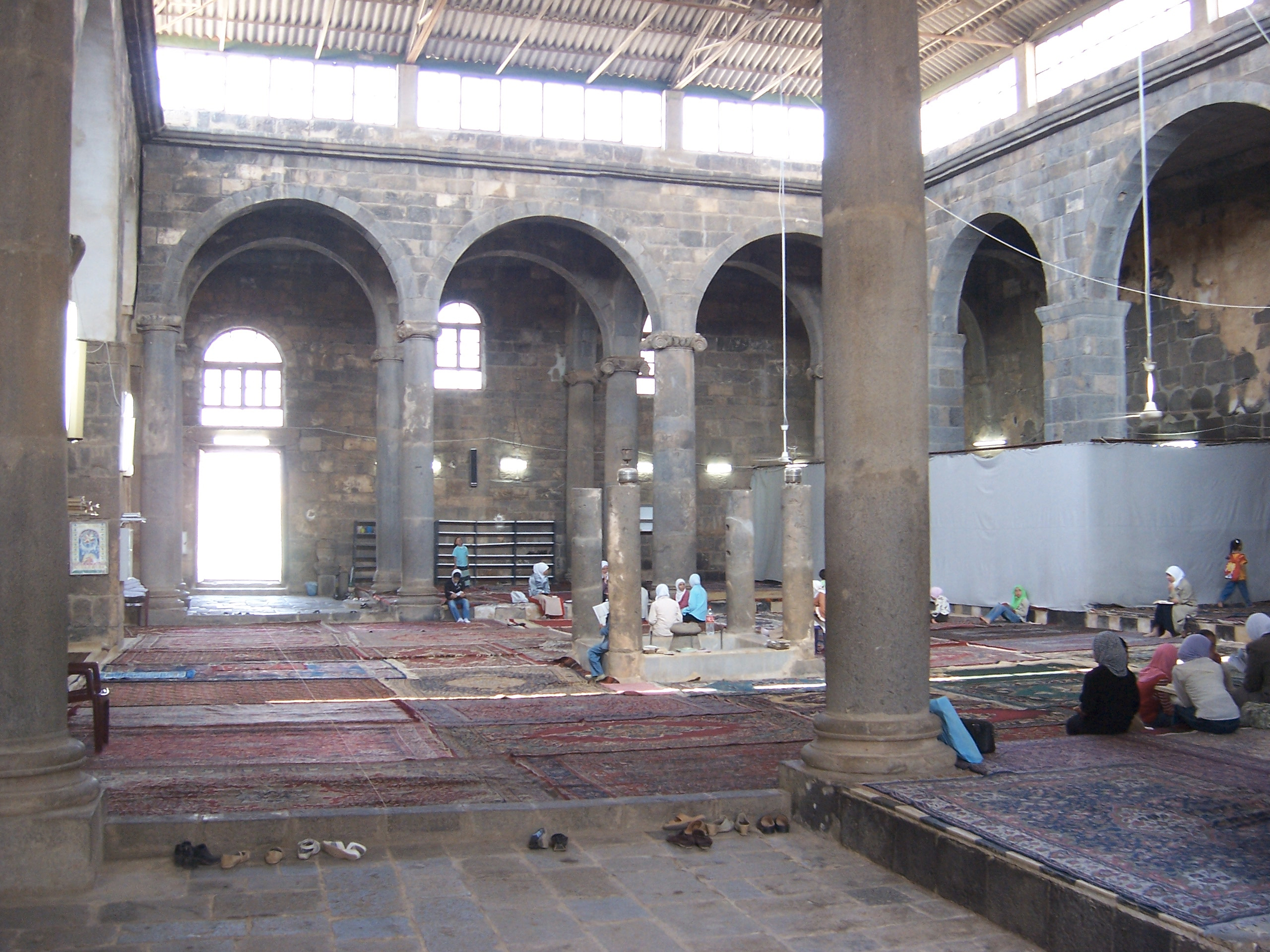
interior

== See also ==
- Islam in Syria
- List of mosques in Syria
