= Samaqiyat =

Al-Samaqiyat السماقيات
- Village
- Location within Syria
- Coordinates: 32°25′46″N 36°23′38″E
- PAL: 281/204
- Country: Syria
- Governorate: Daraa
- District: Daraa
- Subdistrict: Bosra al-Sham

Population (2004 census)
  - Total: 511
- Time zone: UTC+3 (AST)

Al-Samaqiyat, also spelled al-Summaqiyat or Smaqiyat (Arabic: السماقيات), is a village in southern Syria, administratively part of the Daraa Governorate, located east of Daraa and south of Bosra. Other nearby localities include al-Mataaiya to the west and Samad to the northeast. According to the Syria Central Bureau of Statistics (CBS), Samaqiyat had a population of 511 in the 2004 census.

== History ==
Samaqiyat had been an abandoned village as of 1890, but was resettled by Christians by 1895, when the village had about eleven families. The population grew to twenty-five families by 1905. Because its location in the Hamad desert steppe, its land was dry. It also experienced raids by the Druze from the neighboring Jabal al-Druze mountain and by the Bedouin tribes active in the area. The Bedouin overran the area surrounding the village in 1909. Since the Ottoman era, the village has been dominated by the Miqdad clan.

== Bibliography ==
- Schumacher; et al. (1897). "Der Südliche Basan". Zeitschrift des Deutschen Palästina-Vereins. 19–20: 65–227.
