= Ancient City of Bosra =

Archaeological site in Bosra, Syria

UNESCO World Heritage Site
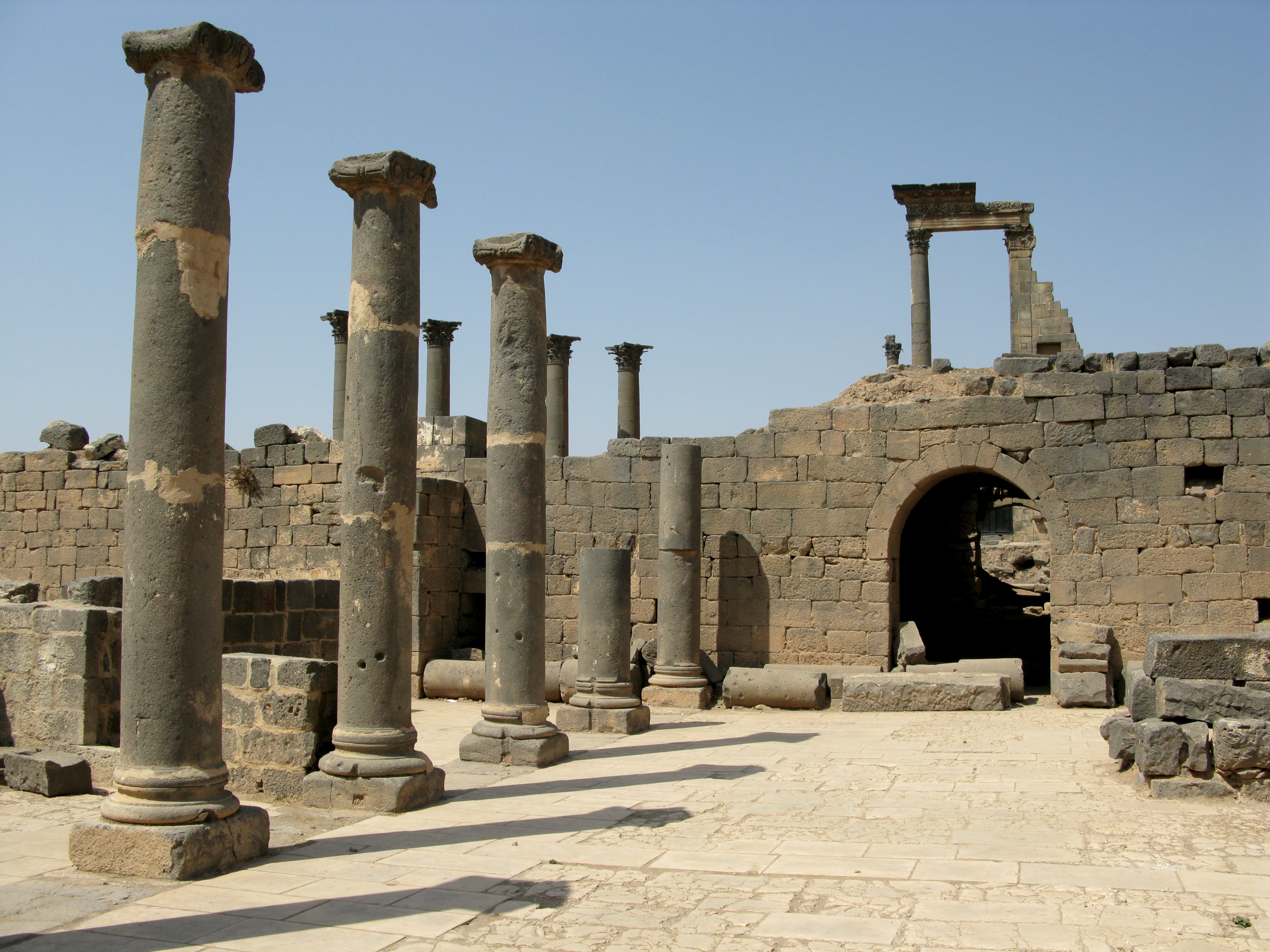
- Ruins in Bosra

- Location within Syria
- Location: Bosra, Syria
- Criteria: Cultural: (i), (iii), (vi)
- Reference: 22
- Inscription: 1980 (4th Session)
- Endangered: 2013–present
- Area: 116.2 ha (287 acres)
- Buffer zone: 200.4 ha (495 acres)
- Coordinates: 32°31′05″N 36°28′54″E

The Ancient City of Bosra is an archaeological site located in the city of Bosra, Syria. The site illustrates the Roman, Byzantine and Muslim civilizations, and was inscribed by UNESCO on the list of World Heritage Sites in 1980.

== History ==
Bosra, once the capital of the Roman province of Arabia, was an important stopover on the ancient caravan route to Mecca. A magnificent 2nd-century Roman theatre, early Christian ruins and several mosques are found within its great walls.

=== UNESCO World Heritage ===
In 1980, the Ancient City of Bosra was listed as a UNESCO World Heritage site, following the criteria (i), (iii) and (vi). The protected area is of 116.2 hectares (287 acres), while the buffer zone comprehends 200.4 hectares (495 acres).

However, in 2017, the site was inscribed in the list of World Heritage in Danger, because of armed conflict in the country.
