= Roman Theatre at Bosra =

Ancient Roman theatre in Bosra, Syria

- المسرح الروماني ببصرى (Arabic)
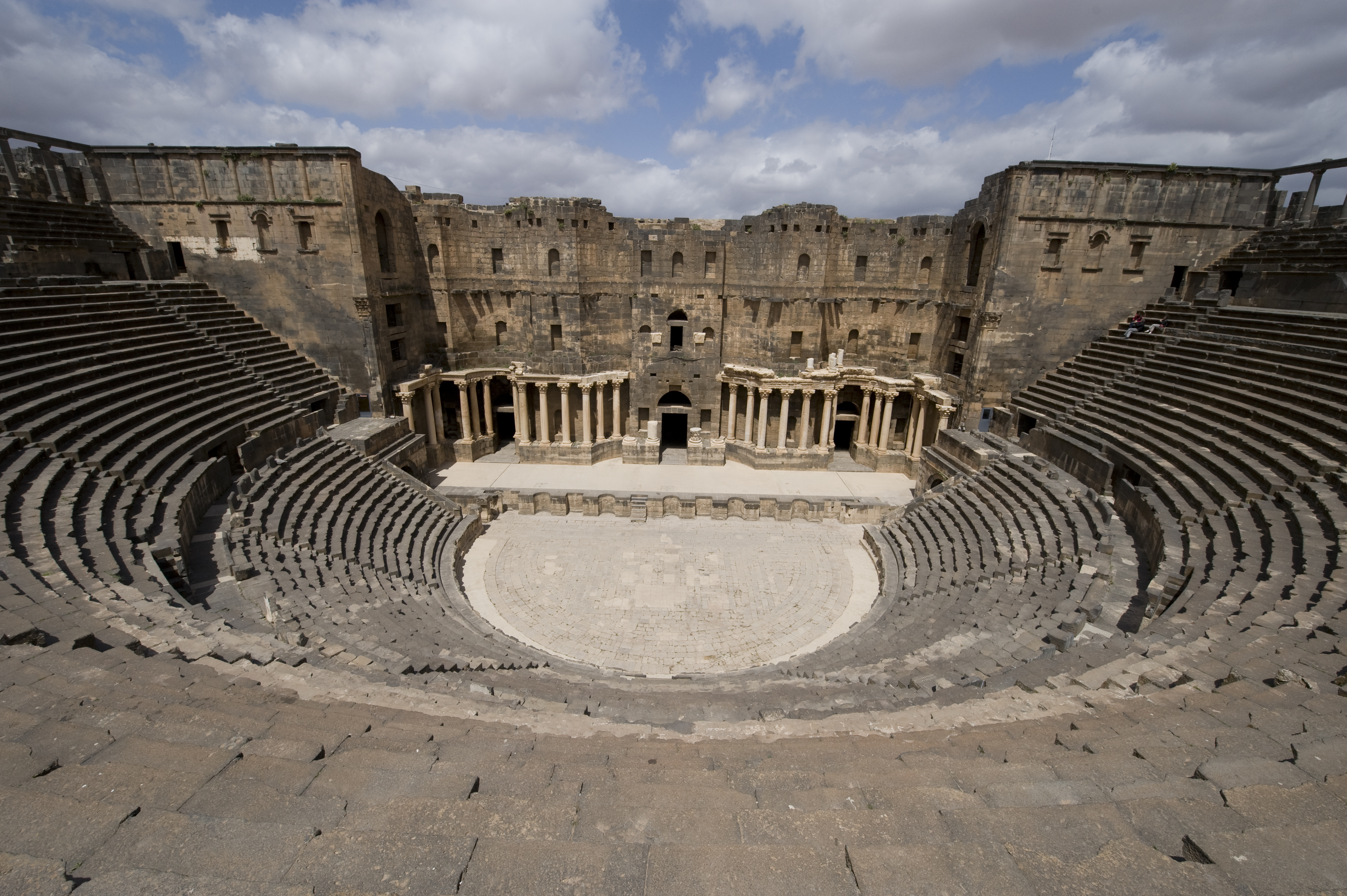

- Location within Syria
- 32.517°N 36.481°E
- Type: Roman theatre
- Cultures: Roman
- Location: Bosra, Syria
- Part of: Bosra

Site notes
- Width: 102 metres (335 ft)
- Architectural style: Roman (with later exterior Ayyubid fortifications)
- Excavation dates: 1947–1970
- Condition: restored
- Owner: Public
- Public access: Yes

The Roman Theatre at Bosra (Arabic: المسرح الروماني ببصرى, romanised: al-masraḥ ar-rūmānī bi-Buṣrā) is a large Roman theatre in Bosra, in the district of Daraa in south-western Syria.

== History ==
=== Roman theatre ===
It was built in either the second quarter or the second half of the second century CE, and is constructed of black basalt. It is likely that the theatre was built during the reign of Trajan.

The theatre is 102 metres across and has seating for about 17,000 people; it is thus among the largest of the Ancient Roman civilisation. It served a city that once had 80,000 inhabitants. It is also one of the best preserved both in Syria and across the Roman empire. It was substantially restored between 1947 and 1970, before which it contained large quantities of sand, which may have helped to protect the interior.

=== Medieval fortress ===
The theatre was originally outside the walls of the town, but was later completely enclosed by an Ayyubid fortress,to serve as a citadel and to guard a road leading to Damascus. The first fortifications were probably two small towers added in 1088 by the Seljuks, with another tower built in 1147-48 in response to the Crusades. However, these simple defences were dwarfed by a ring of eight massive towers erected under Al-Adil I in 1202-18. They are all vaulted, with strong roofs to carry siege engines, and the largest is 25x37m in footprint. They appear to have been built by masons from Damascus

=== Syrian Civil War ===
As of July 2018, the site is still on the UNESCO's list of World Heritage in Danger. The theatre was added to the list in 2013. The site has been damaged in the Syrian Civil War by various military activities conducted nearby. For instance, snipers have been active at the site.

== Gallery ==
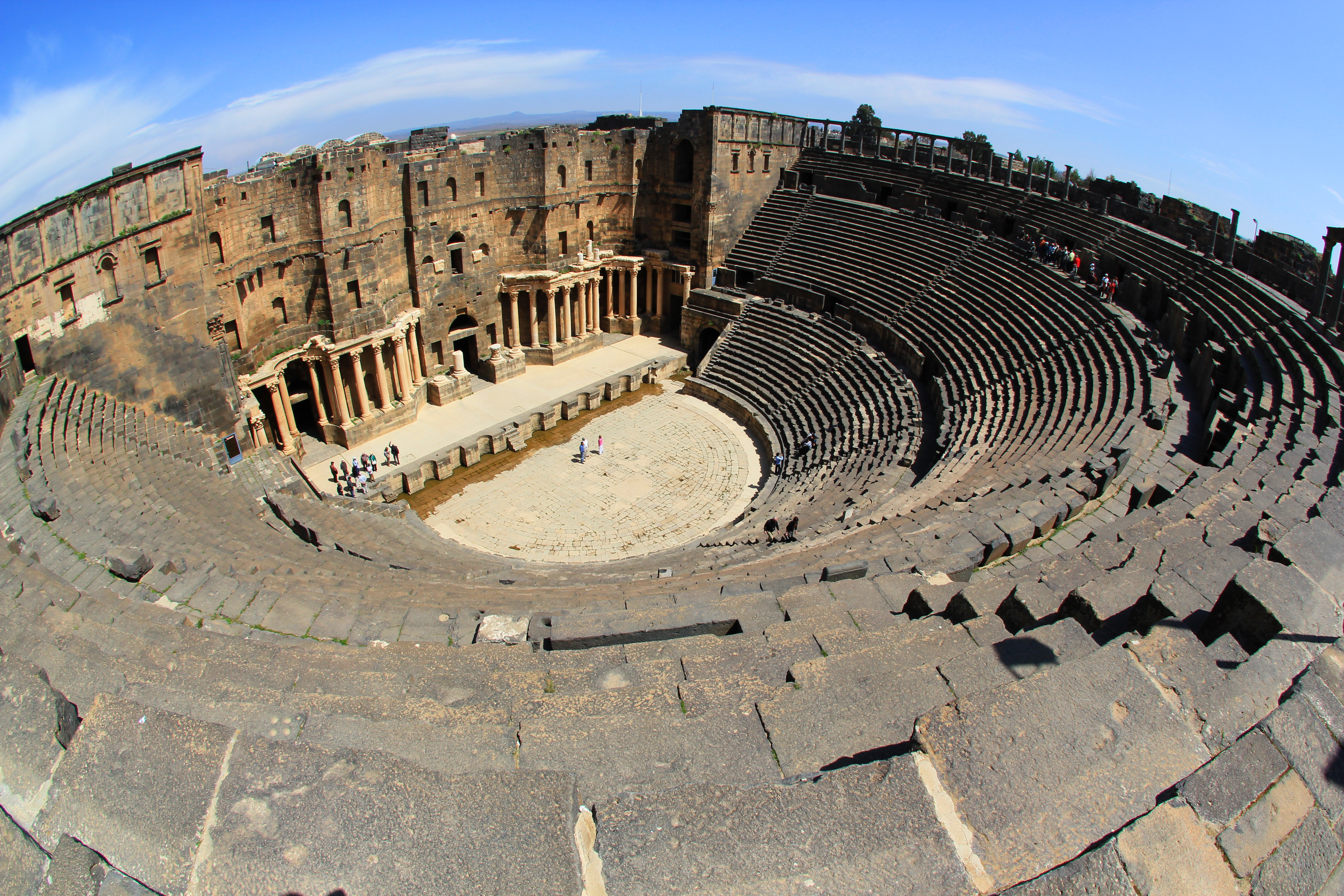
Panoramic view of the theatre

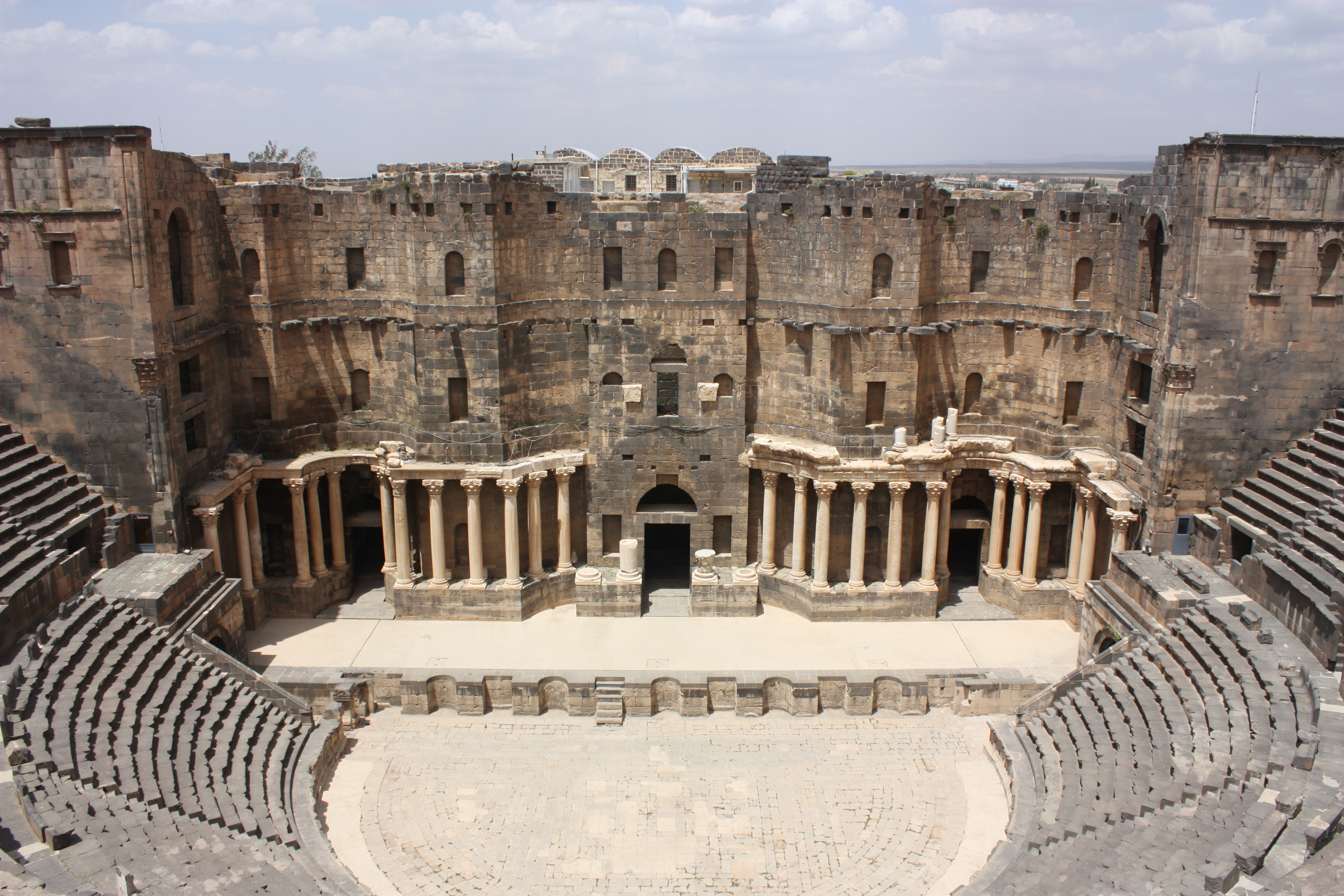
Stage of the theatre

Inside the theatre

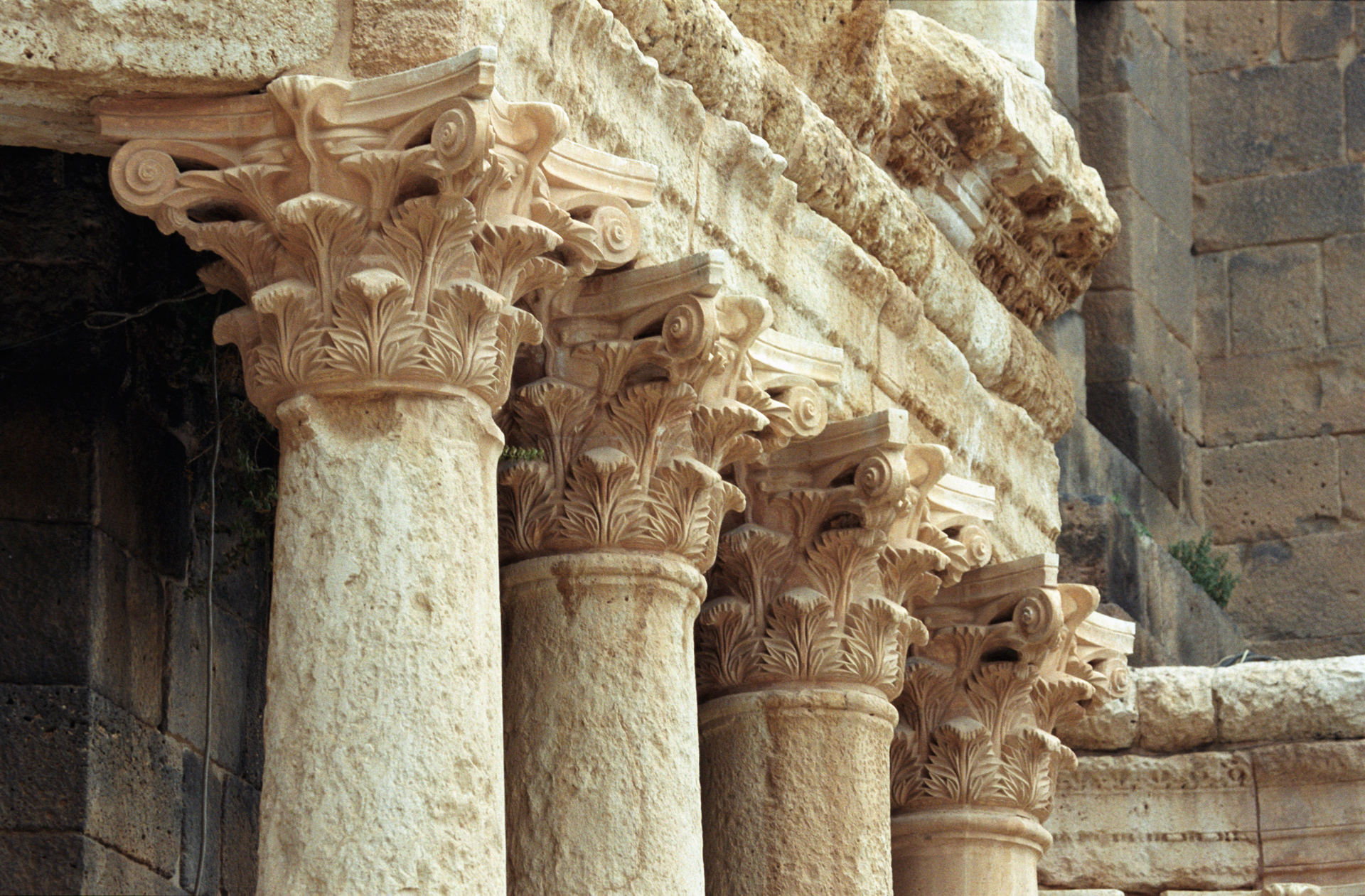
Corinthian columns

The Ayyubid fortifications

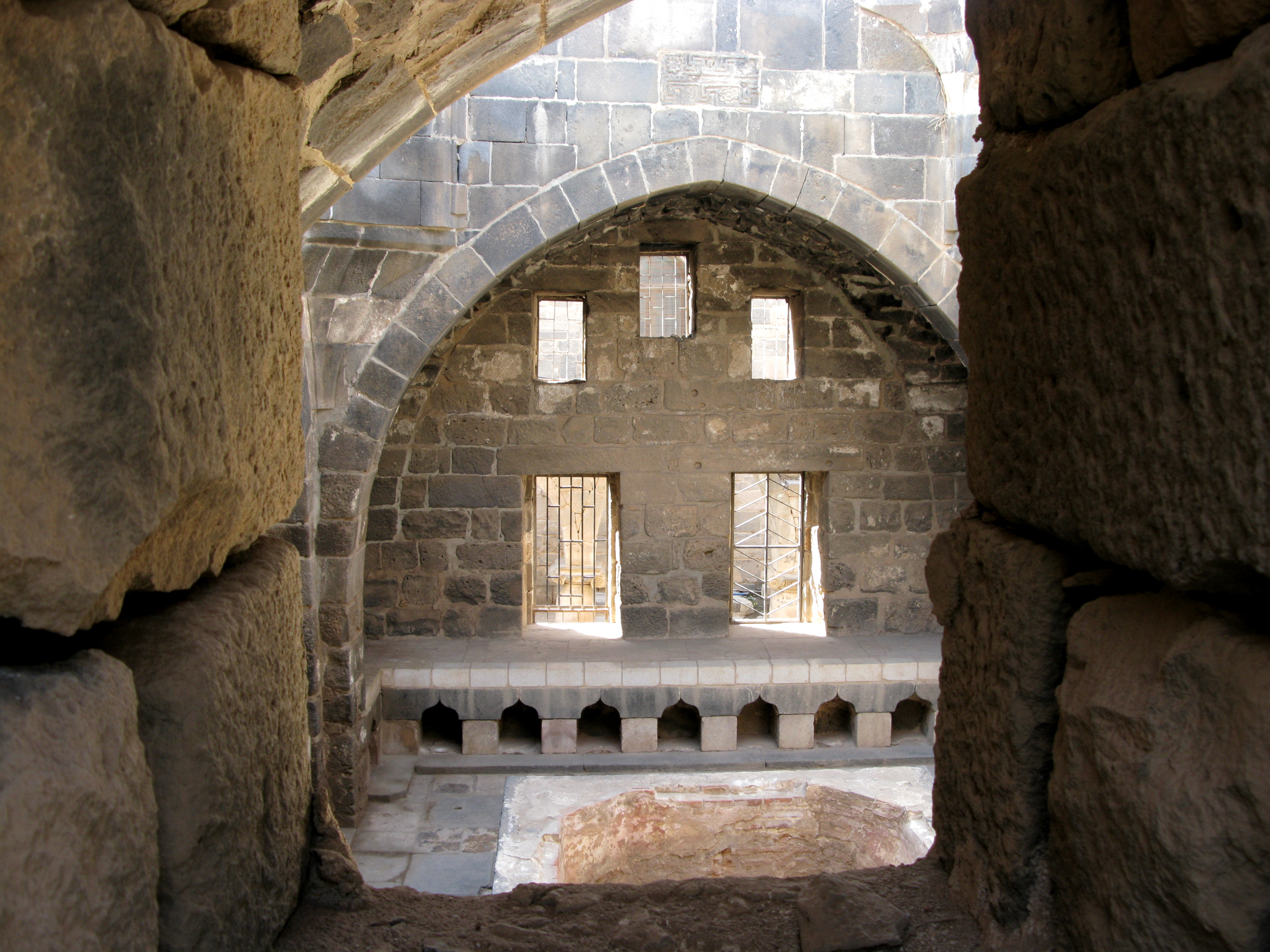
Interior of the Ayyubid citadel surrounding the theatre

== See also ==
- List of Roman theatres
- List of castles in Syria
- List of heritage sites damaged during the Syrian civil war
