= Bosra =

Town in Syria

Bosra بُصْرَىٰ بُصْرَىٰ ٱلشَّام
- Town
- Busra al-Sham
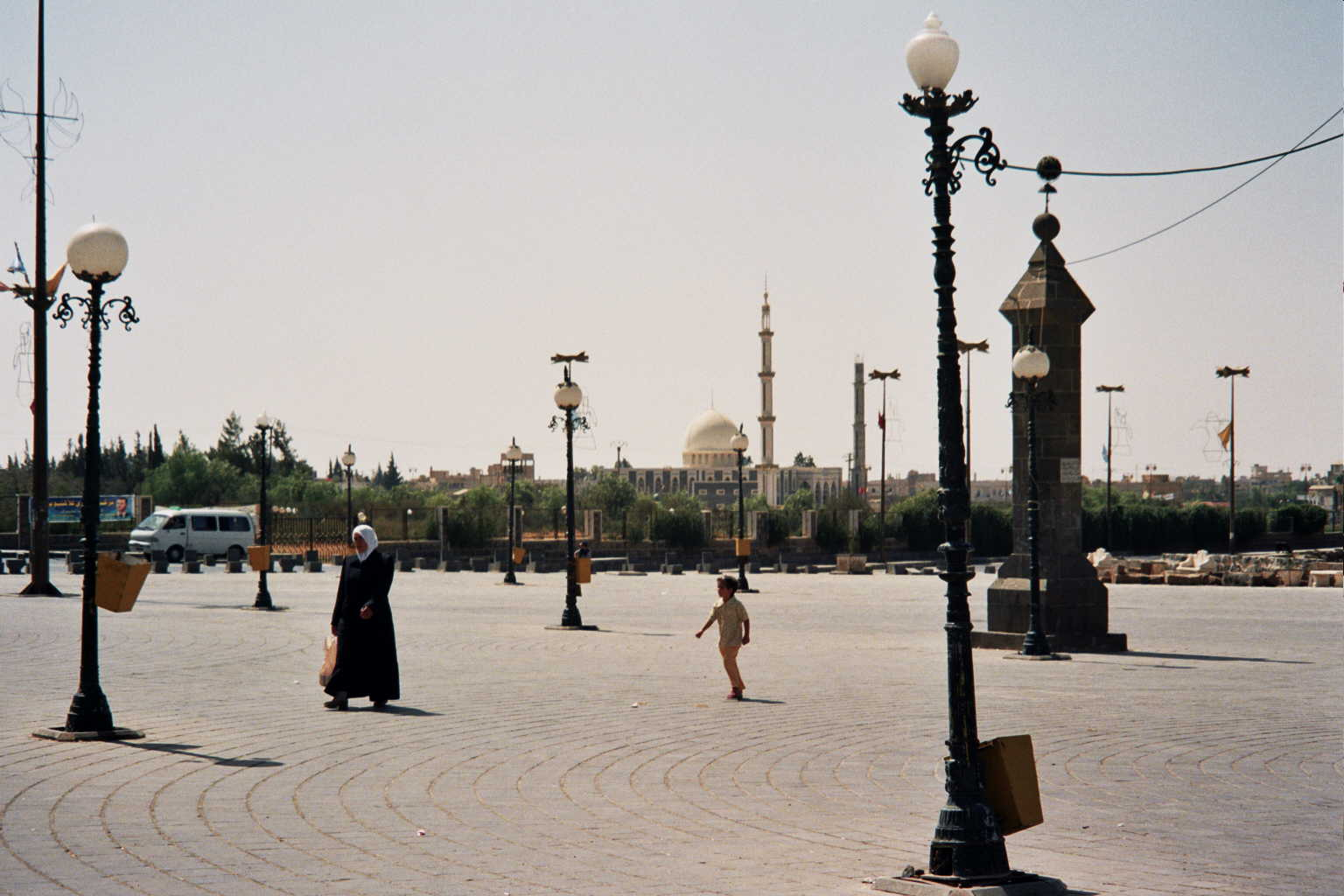
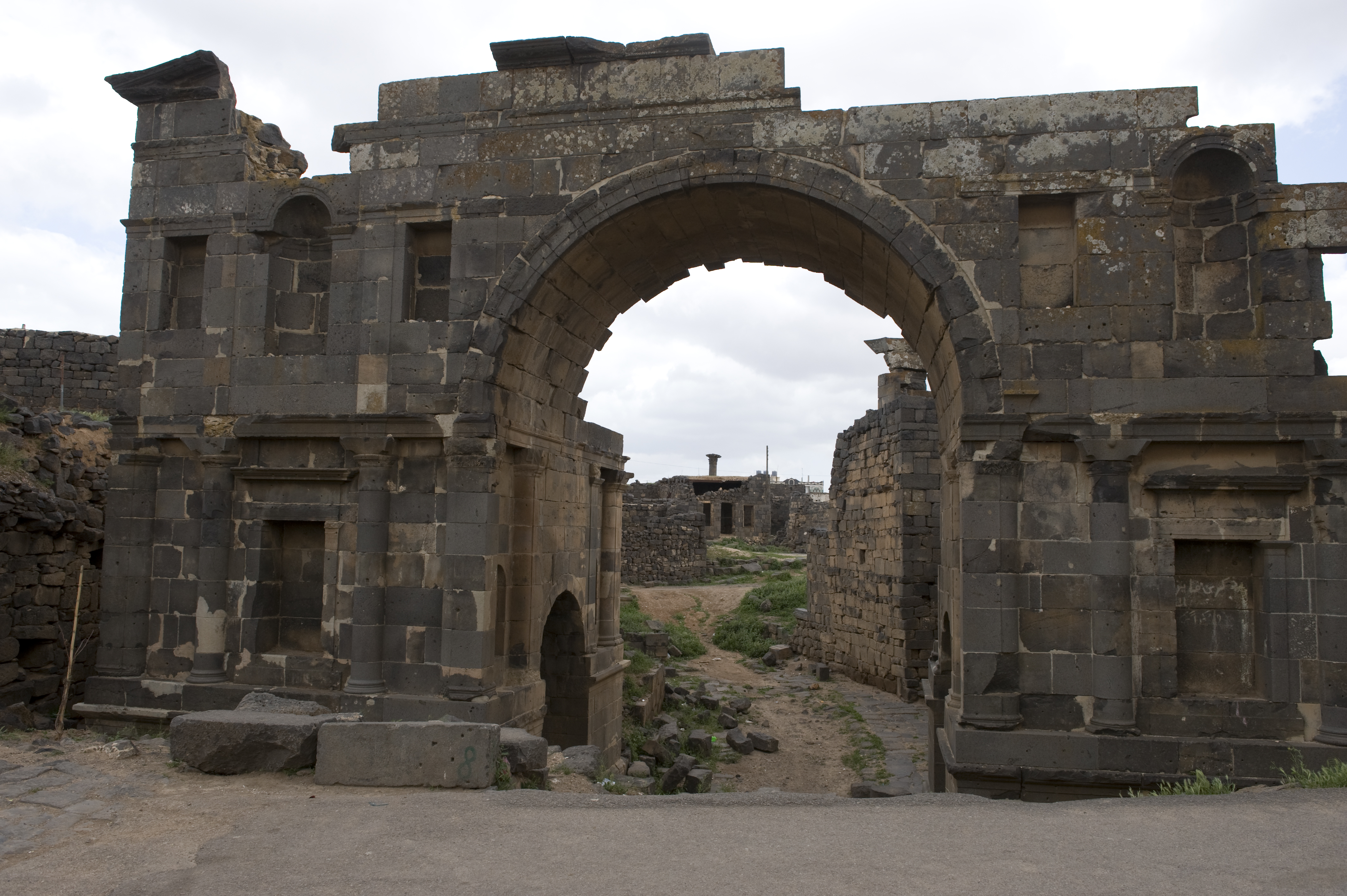
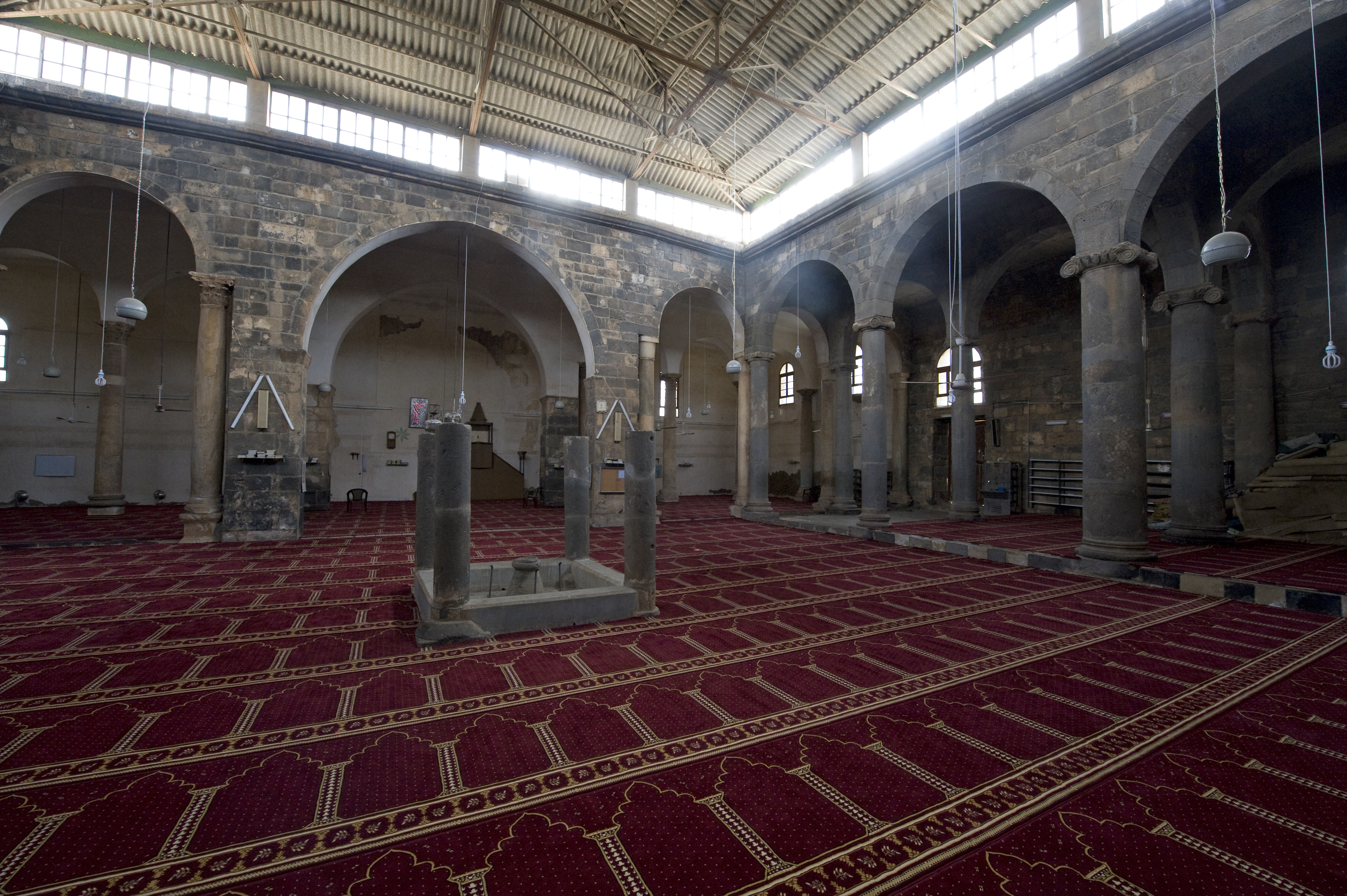
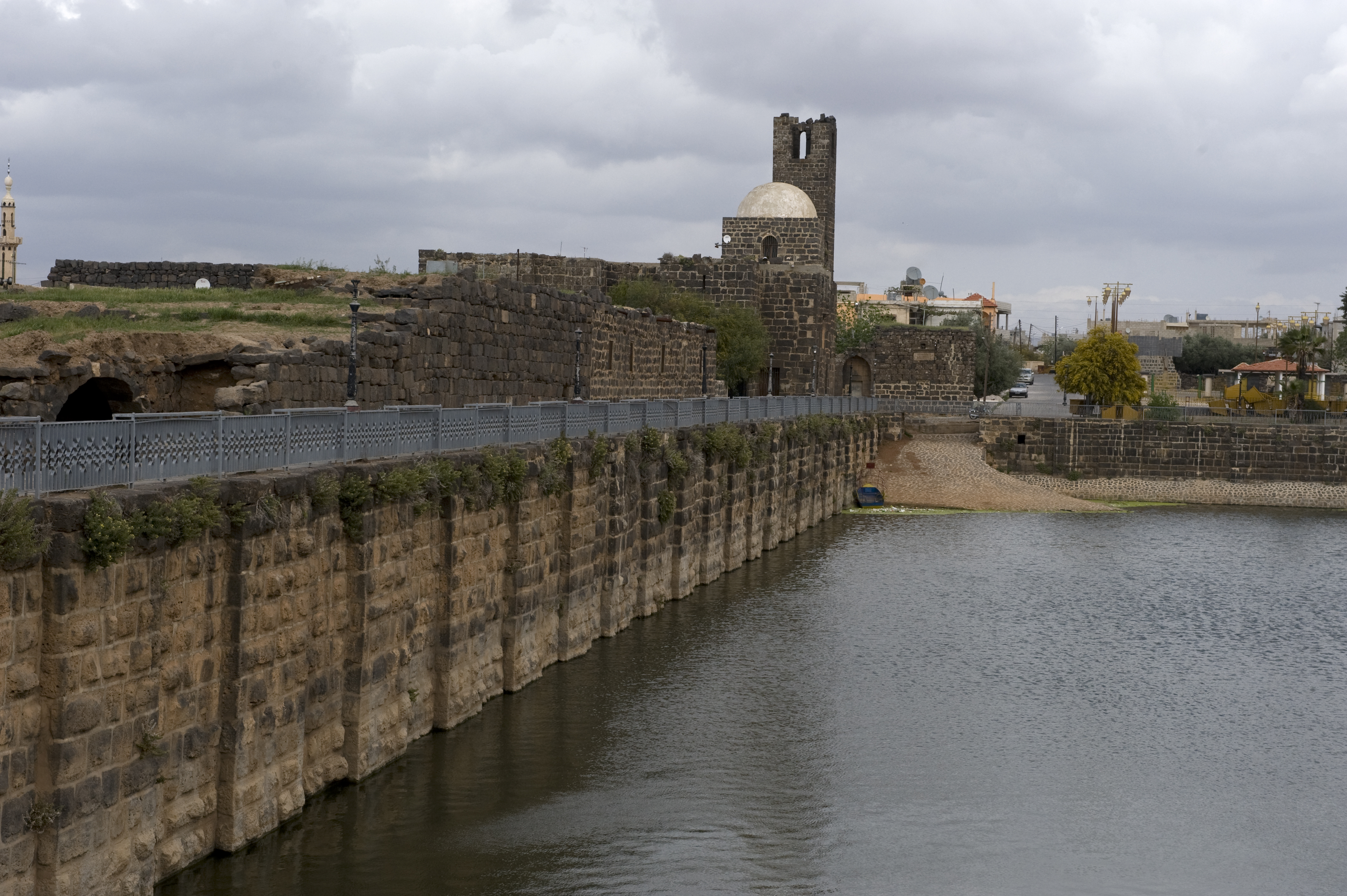
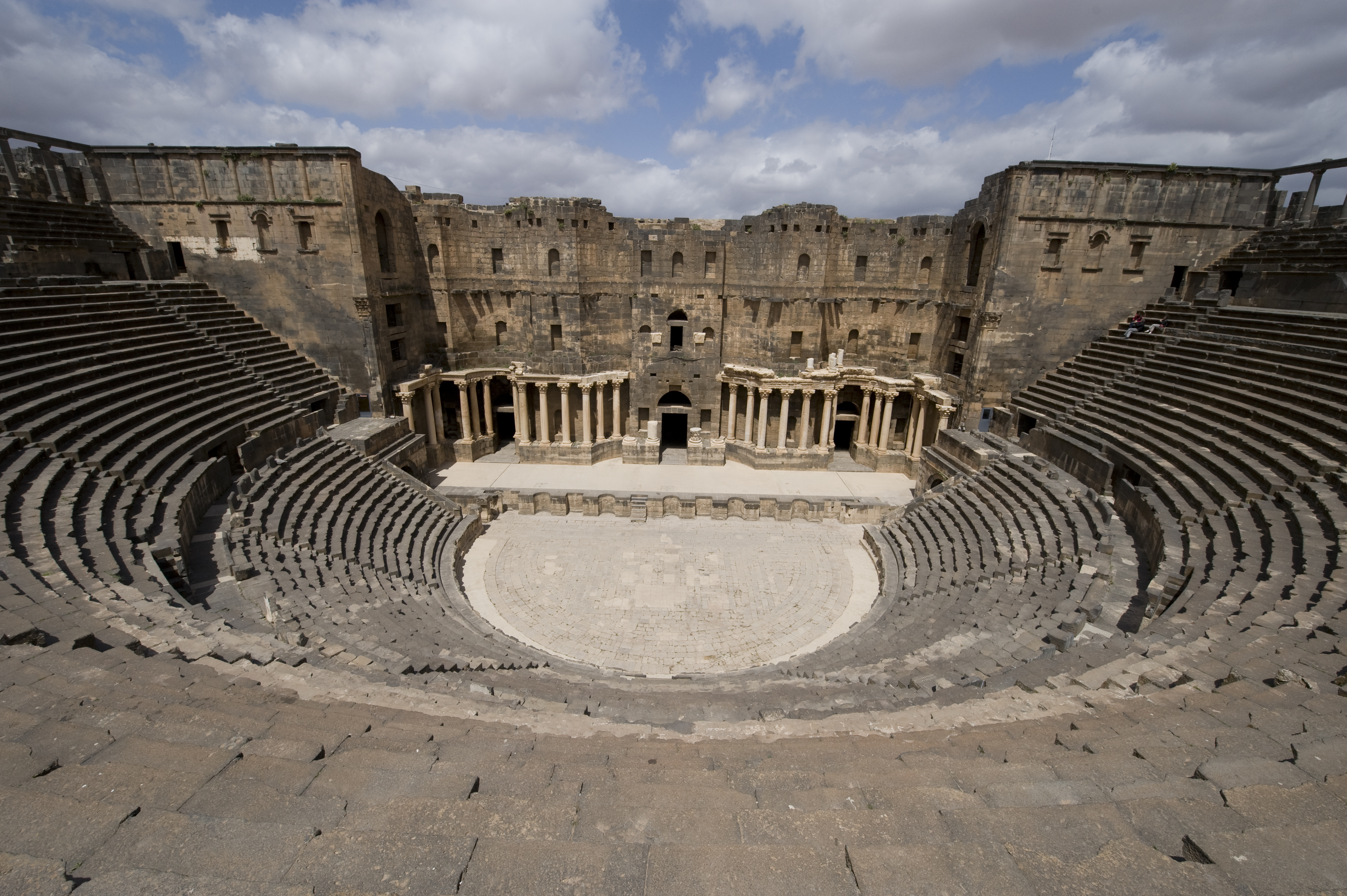
- Bosra Central Square Nabataean Gate Al-Omari Mosque Ayyubid fortifications Bosra cistern Bosra Theatre

- Location in Syria Bosra (Eastern Mediterranean)
- Coordinates: 32°31′06″N 36°28′50″E
- Grid position: 289/214
- Country: Syria
- Governorate: Daraa
- District: Daraa
- Subdistrict: Bosra

Population (2004)
  - Total: 19,683
  - Religions: Sunni Muslim; Shia (minority)
- Time zone: UTC+3 (AST)
- Area code: 15

UNESCO World Heritage Site
- Official name: Ancient City of Bosra
- Criteria: Cultural: i, iii, vi
- Reference: 22
- Inscription: 1980 (4th Session)
- Area: 116.2 ha (287 acres)
- Buffer zone: 200.4 ha (495 acres)

Bosra (Arabic: بُصْرَىٰ, romanized: Buṣrā), historically Bostra (Greek: Βόστρα) and officially called Busra al-Sham (Arabic: بُصْرَىٰ ٱلشَّام, romanized: Buṣrā al-Shām), is a town in southern Syria, administratively belonging to the Daraa District of the Daraa Governorate and geographically part of the Hauran region.

Bosra is an ancient city mentioned in 14th century BC Egyptian sources. It was established as the northern capital of the Nabataean kingdom, and later became the prosperous provincial capital of the Roman province of Arabia Petraea following the dissolution of the Nabatean kingdom. With the advent of Christianity Bostra flourished as a Metropolitan Archbishopric under the jurisdiction of Eastern Orthodox Patriarchate of Antioch and All the East. It also became a Latin Catholic titular see and the episcopal see of a Melkite Catholic Archeparchy.

Throughout its history under various Muslim rulers the city maintained its strategic importance as Syria's southern gateway. It attracted attention from Damascus' rulers and was governed by various lords, serving as a hub for Islamic learning and endowments. However it declined into a village during the Ottoman era, only to be revitalized in the 20th century with the construction of the Hijaz railway and growing archaeological interest, later prompting tourism-focused development by the Syrian government. Today it is a major archaeological site and has been declared by UNESCO as a World Heritage Site.

According to the Syria Central Bureau of Statistics (CBS), Bosra had a population of 19,683 in the 2004 census. It is the administrative center of the nahiyah ("subdistrict") of Bosra, which consisted of nine localities with a total population of 33,839 in 2004. Bosra's inhabitants are predominantly Sunni Muslims.

== History ==
Nabataean columns

=== Nabataean period ===
Bosra was the first Nabatean city in the 2nd century BC. The Nabatean Kingdom was conquered by Cornelius Palma, a general of Trajan, in 106 AD.

According to John Malalas it was called Bostra (Ancient Greek: Βόστρα) after Bostras, a Roman general who was dispatched to the country.

=== Roman period ===
The Roman Theatre at Bosra, dating from the 2nd century AD

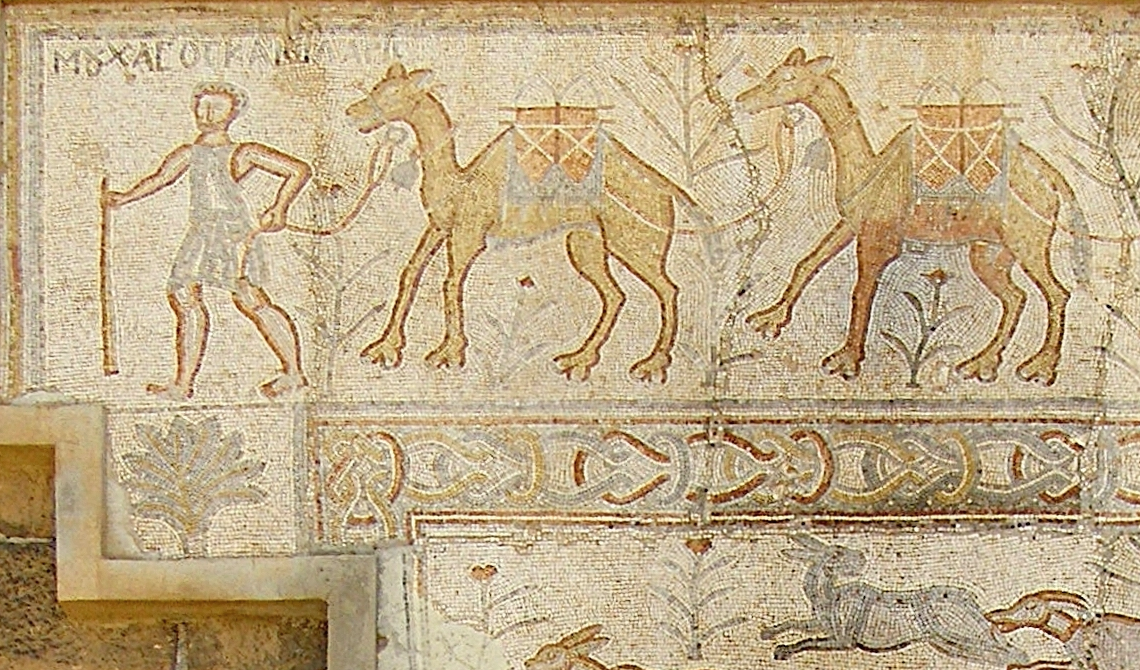
Roman mosaic from Bosra displaying a camel train

Under the Roman Empire Bosra was renamed Nova Trajana Bostra and was the residence of the legio III Cyrenaica. It was made capital of the Roman province of Arabia Petraea. The city flourished and became a major metropolis at the juncture of several trade routes, in particular the Via Traiana Nova, a Roman road that connected Damascus to the Red Sea. It became an important centre for food production and during the reign of Emperor Philip the Arab Bosra began to mint its own coins. The two Councils of Arabia were held at Bosra in 246 and 247 AD. The Babylonian Talmud and Jerusalem Talmud mention Bosra as a town on the border outside Israel, but with a sizeable Jewish population. In the Jerusalem Talmud, it states that Resh Lakish was in Bosra when he saw them sprinkling water to the goddess Aphrodite. In the Babylonian Talmud, tractate Avoda Zara (58b) it likewise mentions how Resh Lakish interacted with the population in Bosra. There are also rabbis who were identified as the sage from Bosra, such as Rabbi Jonah of Bosra. The Talmud (Shabbat 29b) also notes that there was a synagogue in Bosra.

=== Byzantine period ===
By the Byzantine period, which began in the 5th century, Christianity had become the dominant religion in Bosra (Βόσρα in Greek-Byzantine). The city became a Metropolitan archbishop's seat (see below) and a large cathedral was built in the 6th century. Bosra was conquered by the Sasanian Persians in the early 7th century but was recaptured during the Byzantine reconquest.

=== Islamic era ===
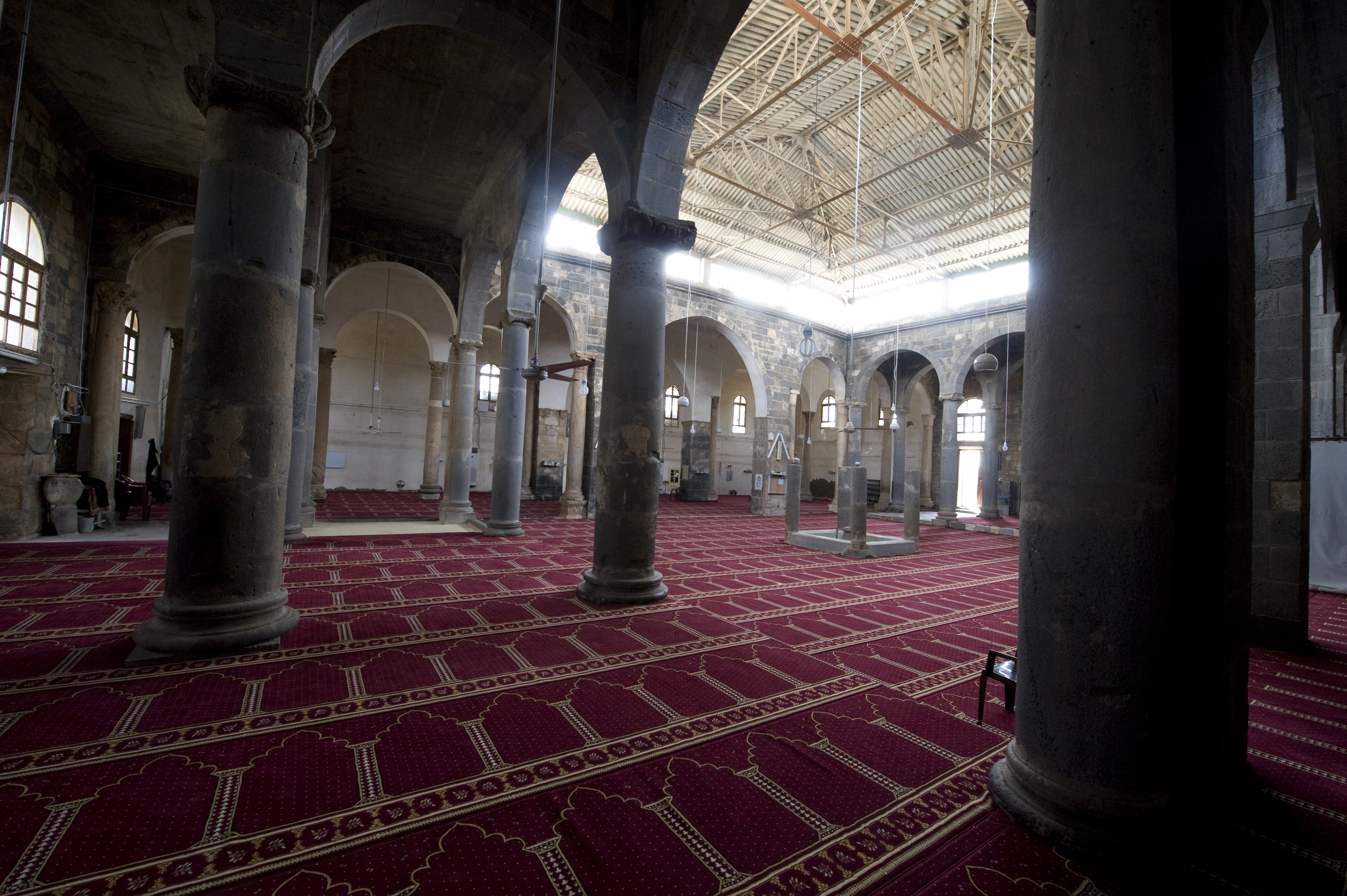
Al-Omari Mosque

Bosra played an important part in the early life of Muhammad, as described in the entry for the Christian monk Bahira. The forces of the Rashidun Caliphate under general Khalid ibn al-Walid captured the city from the Byzantines in the Battle of Bosra in 634. Throughout Islamic rule Bosra would serve as the southernmost outpost of Bilad al-Sham, its prosperity being mostly contingent on the political importance of that city. Bosra held additional significance as a centre of the pilgrim caravan between Damascus and the Muslim holy cities of Mecca and Medina, the destinations of the annual hajj pilgrimage. Early Islamic rule did not alter the general architecture of Bosra, with only two structures dating to the Umayyad era (721 and 746) when Damascus was the capital of the Caliphate. As Bosra's inhabitants gradually converted to Islam the Roman-era holy sites were utilized for Muslim practices. In the 9th century, Ya'qubi wrote that Bosra was the capital of the Hauran province.

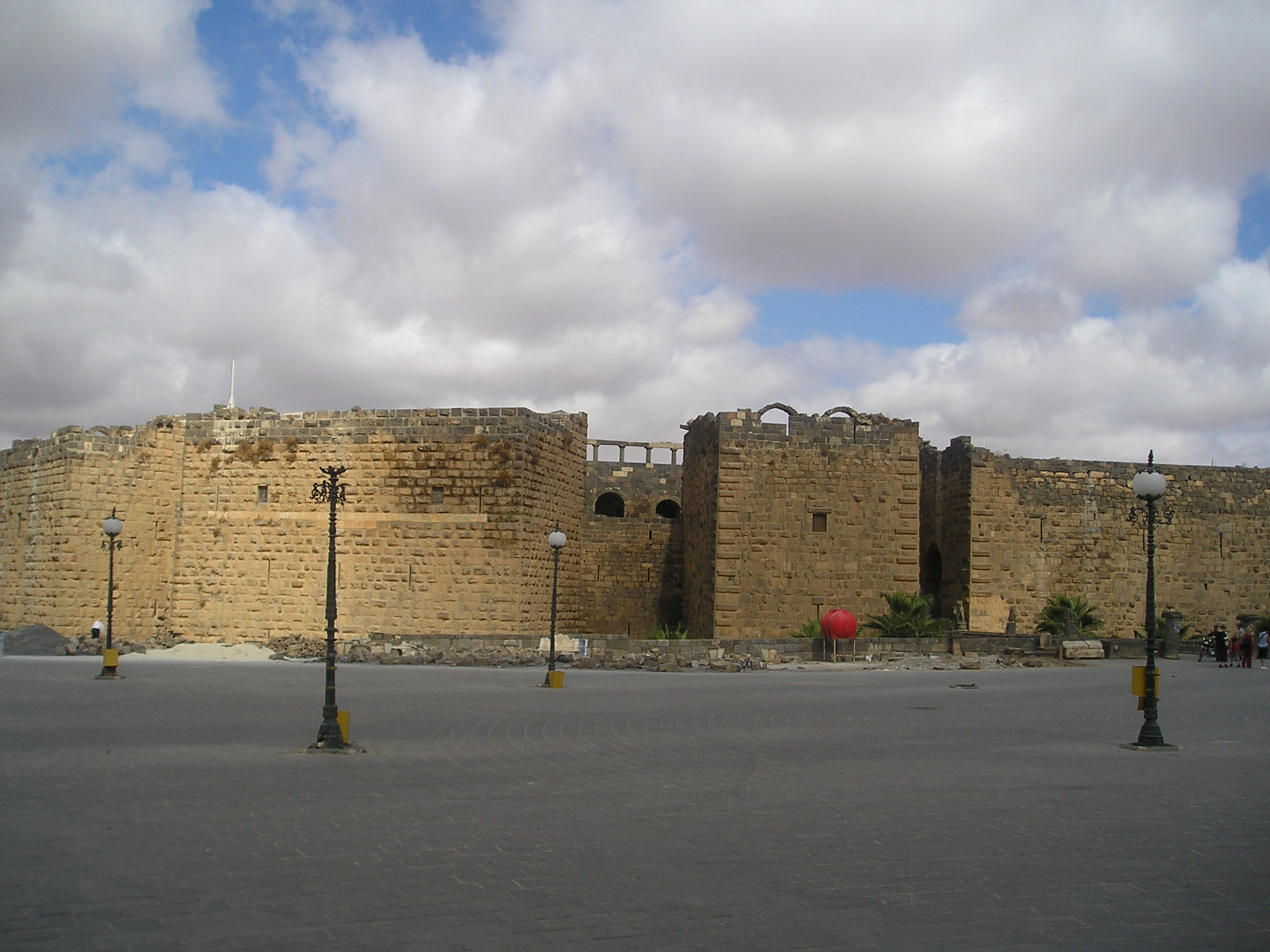
A view of the citadel in Bosra (the theater is located inside)

After the end of the Umayyad era in 750, major activity in Bosra ceased for around 300 years until the late 11th century. In the last years of Fatimid rule, in 1068, a number of building projects were commissioned. With the advent of Seljuk rule in 1076 increasing focus was paid to Bosra's defences. In particular the Roman theatre was transformed into a fortress, with a new floor added to the interior staircase tower. With the coming to power of the Burid dynasty in Damascus, the general Kumushtakin was allotted the entire Hauran plain as a fief by the atabeg Tughtakin. Under Kumushtakin, efforts to enhance the Muslim nature of the city increased with the construction of a number of Islamic edifices. One of these projects was the restoration of the Umari Mosque, which had been built by the Umayyads in 721. Another mosque commissioned was the smaller al-Khidr Mosque at the northwestern part of the city, which was established under Kumushtakin in 1134. Kumushtakin also had a madrasa constructed alongside the Muslim shrine honoring the mabrak an-naqa ("camel's knees"), which marked the imprints of the camel the prophet Muhammad rode on when he entered Bosra in the early 7th century. In 1147 King Baldwin III of Jerusalem led a Crusader force to capture the city but his attempt was thwarted since the Damascene army led by Mu'in ad-Din Unur managed to garrison Bosra's citadel.

A golden age of political and architectural activity in Bosra began during the reign of Ayyubid sultan al-Adil I (1196–1218). One of the first architectural developments in the city was the construction of eight large external towers in the Roman theatre-turned-fortress. The project began in 1202 and was completed in 1253, towards the end of the Ayyubid period. The two northern corner towers alone occupied more space than the remaining six. After al-Adil's death in 1218 his son as-Salih Ismail inherited the fief of Bosra and lived in its newly fortified citadel. During Ismail's rule Bosra gained political prominence. Ismail used the city as his base when he claimed the sultanate in Damascus on two separate occasions, reigning between 1237–38 and 1239–45.

=== Ottoman era ===
In 1596 Bosra appeared in the Ottoman tax registers as Nafs Busra, being part of the nahiyah of Bani Nasiyya in the Qada of Hauran. It had a Muslim population consisting of 75 households and 27 bachelors, and a Christian population of 15 households and 8 bachelors. Taxes were paid on wheat, barley, summer crops, fruit- or other trees, goats and/or beehives and water mill.

When James Silk Buckingham visited Bosra in 1816, he described "a large ruined edifice, which was originally an oblong square, with one semicircular end," containing "a miserable work of the Greek Christians, by whom it was no doubt used as a place of worship up to the period of its destruction." He also noted "an old building, with a high square tower attached to it… with many Arabic inscriptions in different parts of it," as well as another plain building "with crosses sculptured in the doors and walls, and the whole appearance that of an early place of Christian worship." Among the structures of Bosra he was shown was the Serait-el-Bint-el-Yahoodi or "Palace of the Jew's Daughter", though he could not "learn the origin of this name, or obtain an account of any tradition connected with it." He remarked further on the El-Hamam bath, with pointed arches in alternating black and white stone, and on "a large building entirely constructed out of the ruins of more ancient edifices," containing "Cufic, Arabic, and Greek" inscriptions and "a mixture of antiquity and freshness, of wealth and poverty, of skill and ignorance." He described ascending a great square tower of sixty-four steps, with stone doors on its stages and an open space at the top, from which "we enjoyed a commanding view of the ruins of Bosra." Buckingham also saw "a Roman arched gateway, not unlike that of Jerash," Corinthian colonnades standing in the town's streets, and the castle of Bosra, which he thought showed "a mixture of styles which rendered it exceedingly difficult to say in what age or by what people they were constructed," containing Roman sculpture and Arabic inscriptions dated to 722 AH.

According to the 1914 Ottoman population statistics, the district of Busra had a total population of 26.355, consisting of 22.485 Muslims, 3.096 Orthodox Greeks, 594 Catholic Greeks, and 180 Protestants.

=== Modern era ===
Today Bosra is a major archaeological site, containing ruins from Roman, Byzantine and Muslim times, its main feature being the well-preserved Roman theatre. Every year a national music festival is held in the main theatre.

Significant social and economic changes have affected Bosra since the end of the French Mandate in 1946. Whereas until the 1950s the shopkeepers of Bosra were from Damascus, since then most have lived in the town. In the late Ottoman era and the French Mandate period the agricultural relationship was between the small landowner and the sharecroppers, but since the agrarian reforms in the late 1950s and 1960s the relevant relationship has been between the landowners and the wage laborers. Many of its residents have found work in the Gulf Cooperation Council states, sending the proceeds to their relatives in Bosra. Social changes and increased access to education have largely diminished traditional clan life according to historian Hanna Batatu.

During the presidency of Hafez al-Assad (1970–2000), Bosra and the surrounding villages were largely free of government interference and for the most part were politically dominated by members of the prominent al-Mokdad clan, who served as intermediaries of sorts between the residents of the town and the governor of Daraa and the Ba'ath Party branch secretary.

On 14 October 2012, there was intense gunfire from government forces stationed at checkpoints on the main road running through the town. On 13 November 2012, fierce fighting was reported in the east of the town. By January 2013, after 22 months of conflict during the ongoing Syrian Civil War, some refugees fleeing Bosra were speaking of escalating violence, with many bodies being left in the streets. On 15 January 2013, it was reported that the citadel was used by the army to shell the town on a daily basis. After the beginning of February 2014 the city was under the control of the Syrian Army. However on 31 January 2015, the Army's 5th Division confronted a contingent from the rebels near the famous Roman theatre – fierce firefights broke out between the groups. On 1 February 2015, the Army forces shelled areas in the east of the town. On 25 March 2015, Syrian rebels seized the town, ousting Syrian soldiers and allied militiamen after four days of intense battle.

Bosra was recaptured by the Syrian Arab Army on 2 July 2018 following the surrender of the rebel forces. The recapture was a part of the Daraa Offensive, which involved the surrender and/or reconciliation of many rebel groups in the area.

== Landmarks ==
Of the city that once counted 80,000 inhabitants there remains today only a village among the ruins. The 2nd-century Roman theatre of Bosra, constructed probably under Trajan, is the only monument of this type with its upper gallery in the form of a covered portico fully preserved. It was fortified between 481 and 1231.

There are also Nabatean and Roman monuments, Christian churches, mosques, and Madrasahs within the half-ruined enceinte of the city. The structure of the cathedral, a central plan with eastern apses flanked by two sacristies, exerted a decisive influence on the evolution of Christian architectural forms and to a certain extent on Islamic style. Al-Omari Mosque of Bosra is one of the oldest surviving mosques in Islamic history.

Close by are the Kharaba Bridge and the Gemarrin Bridge, both Roman bridges.

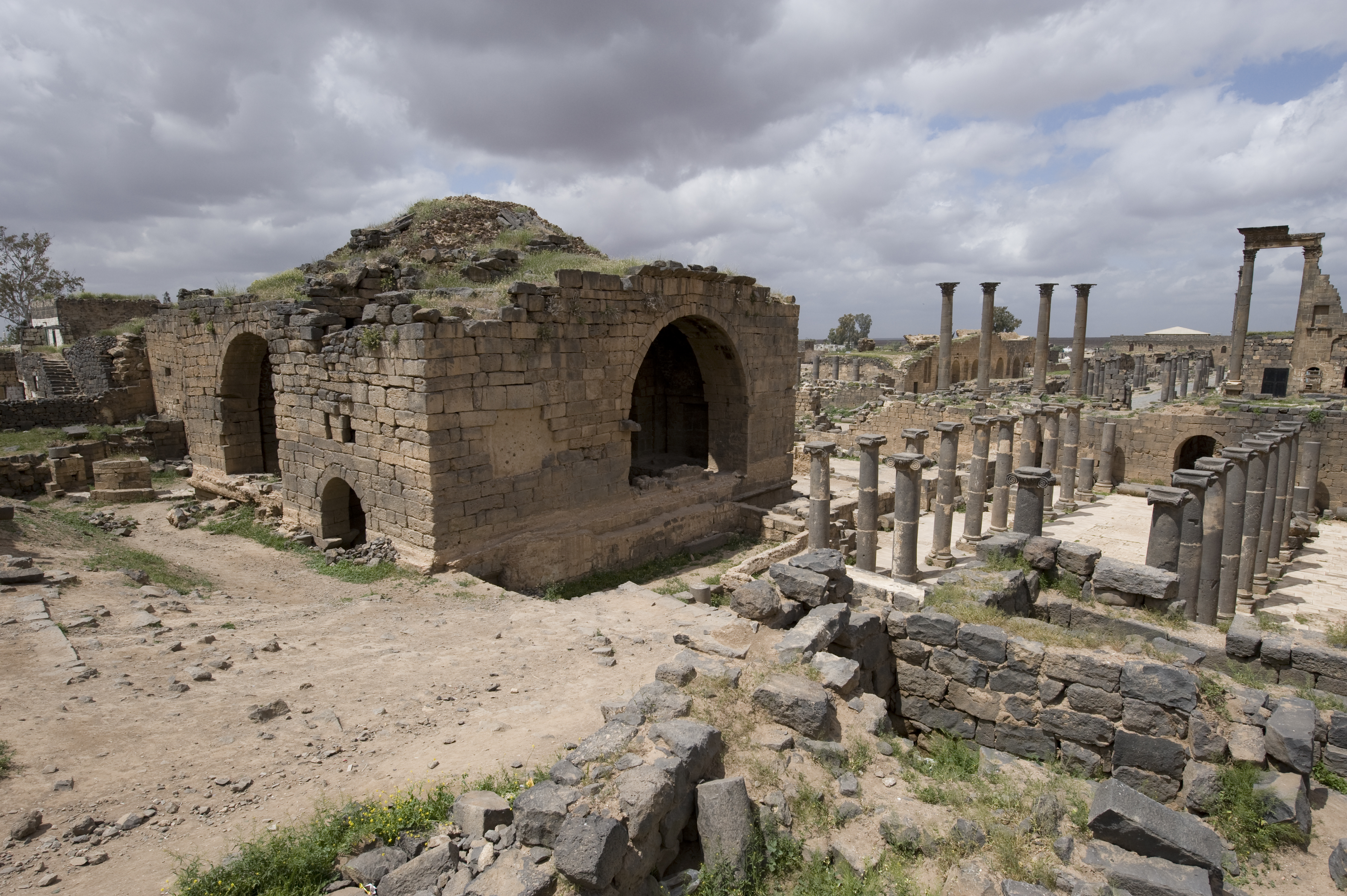
Southern Baths in Bosra

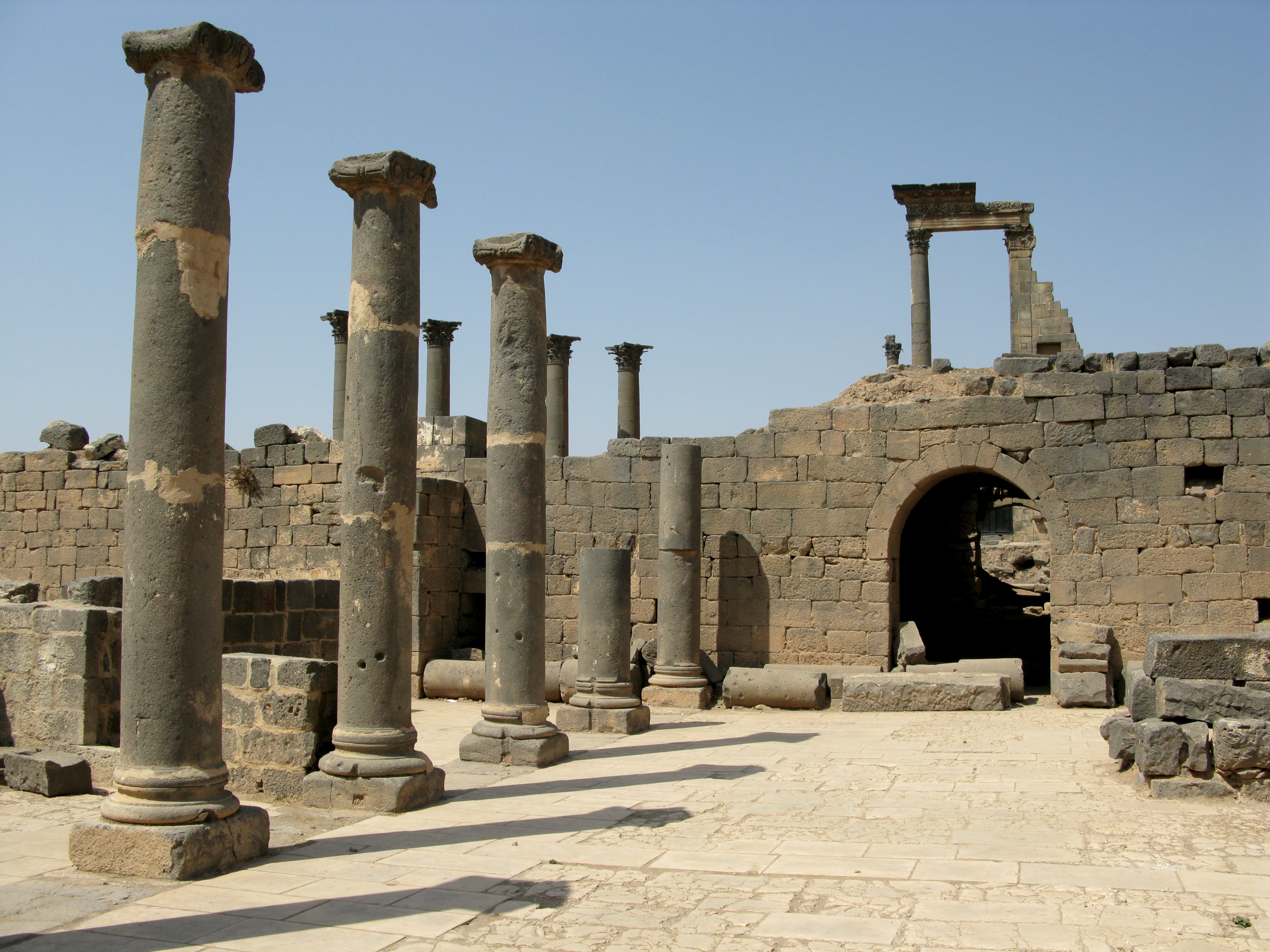
Ruins

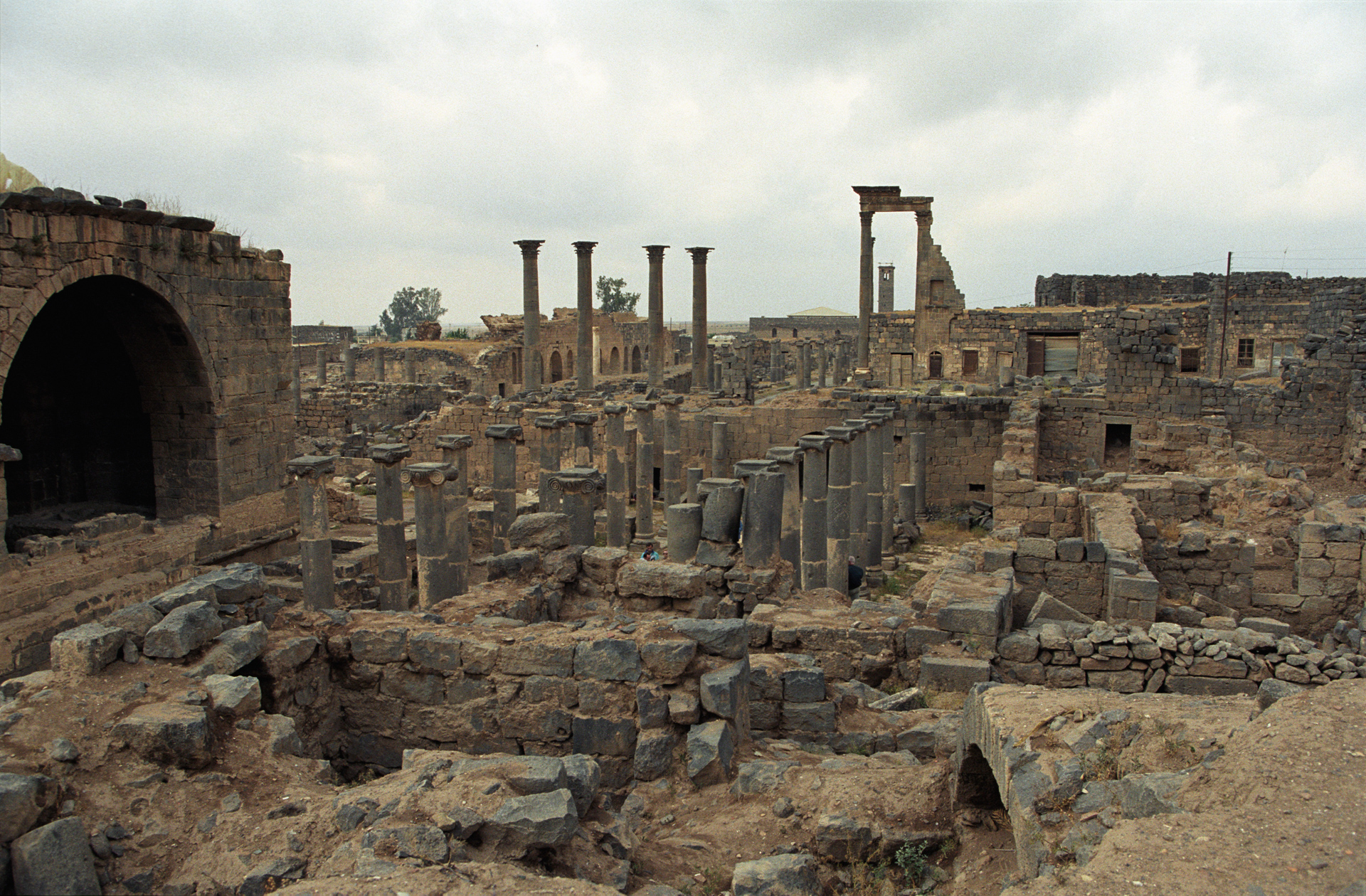
Bosra ruins

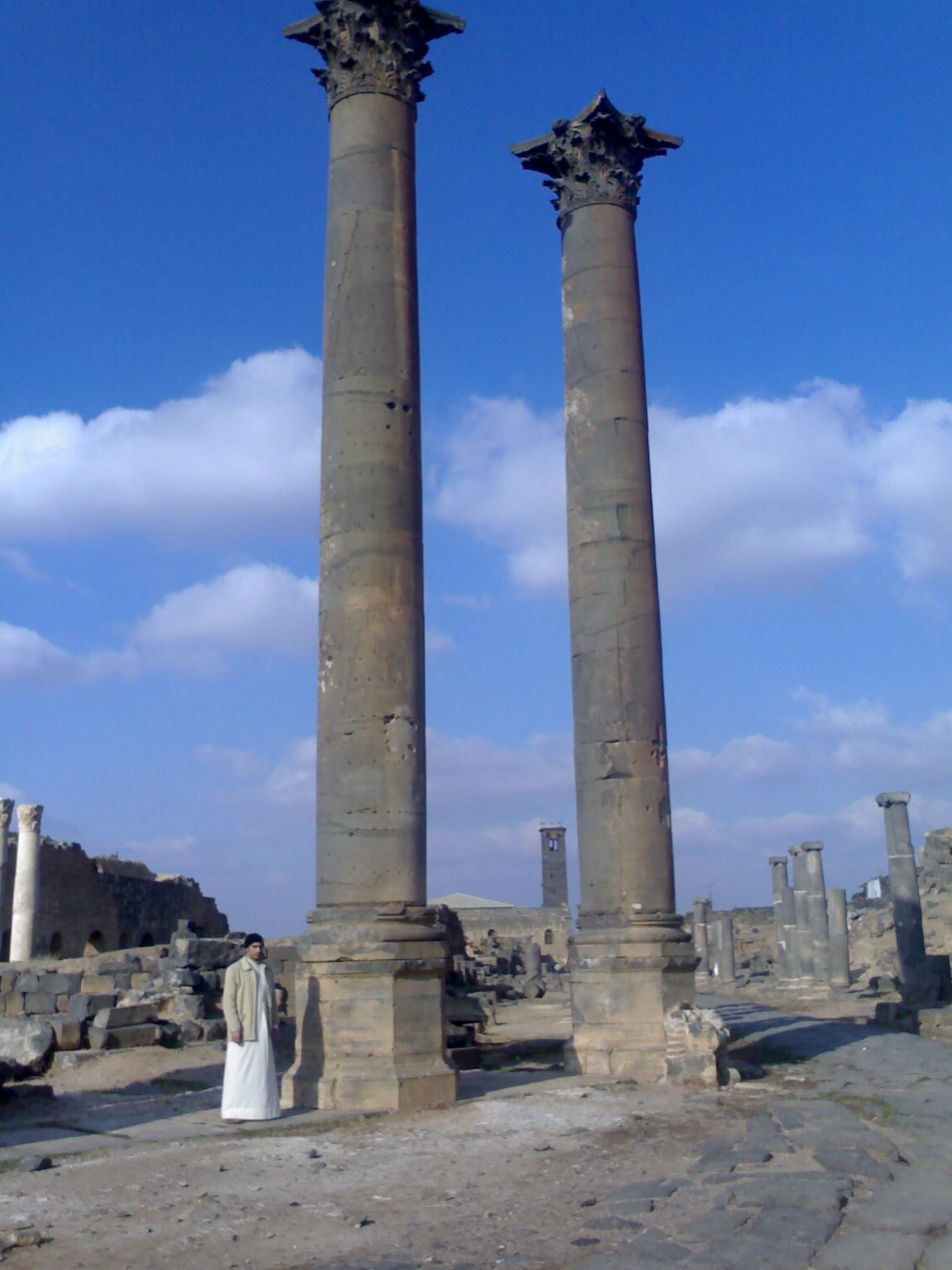
Nabatean Pillars displaying Corinthian order

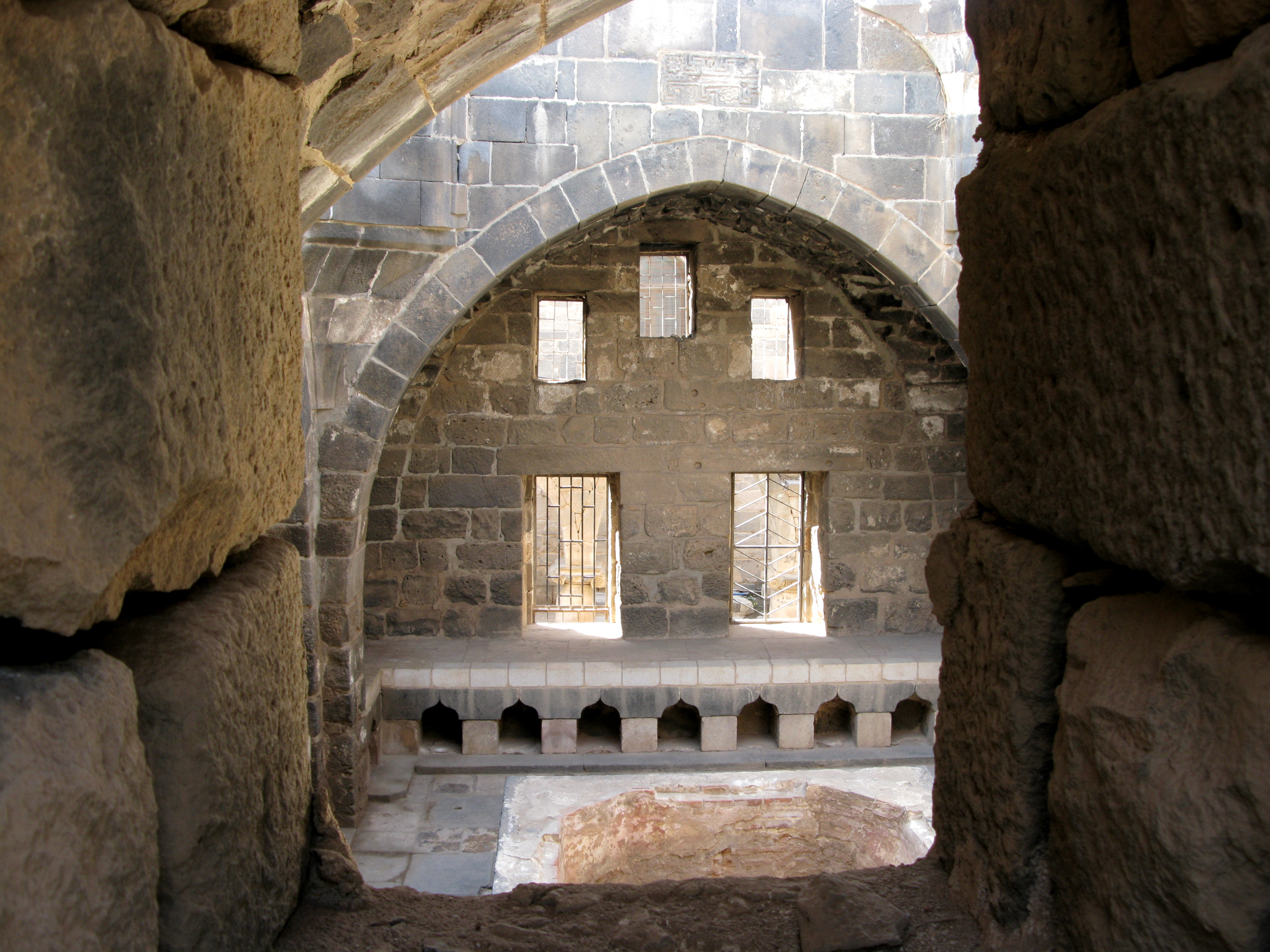
Bosra Citadel

Partial view of the Nabataean Gate

Nabataean gate information

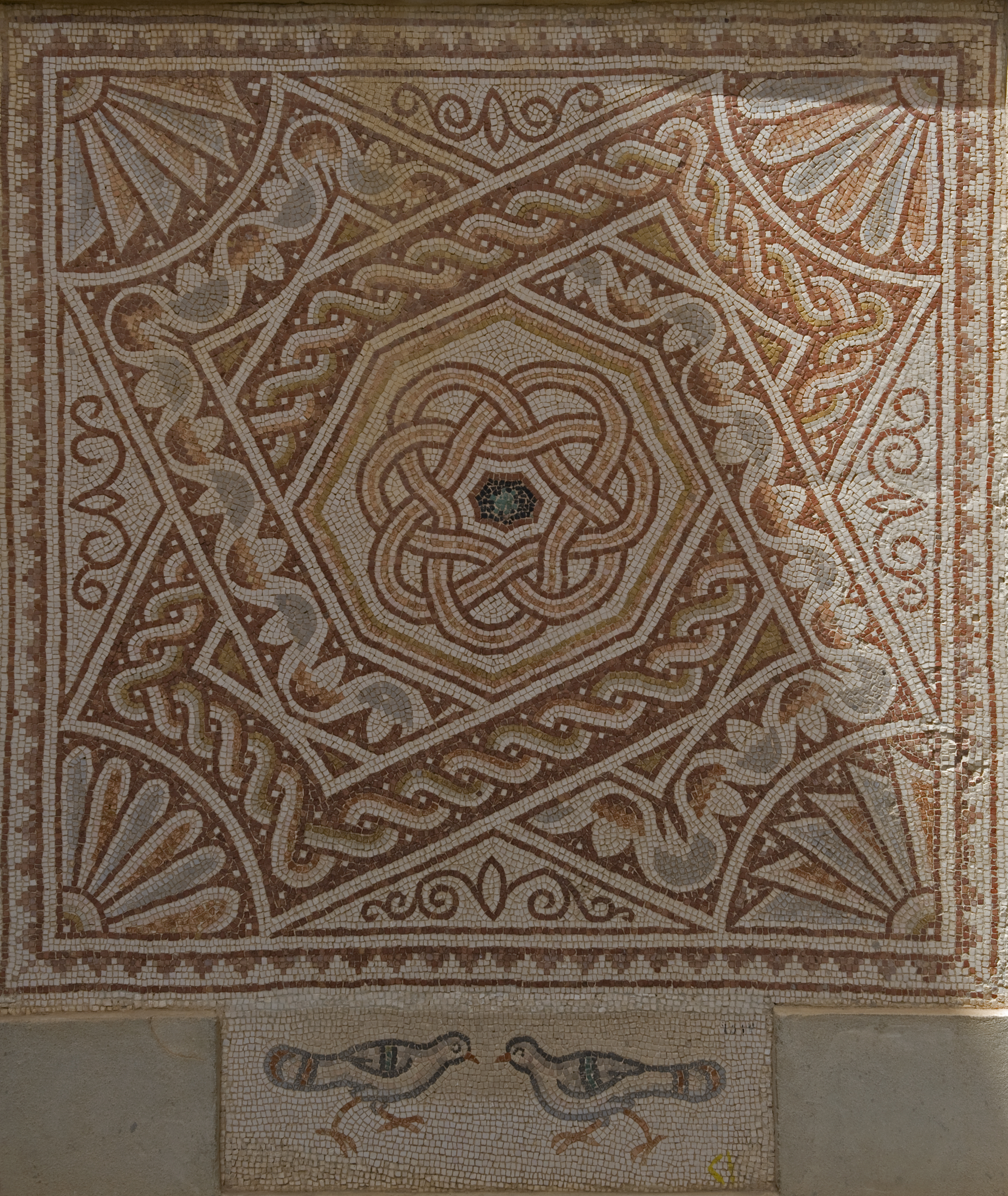
Mosaics in the Bosra theatre

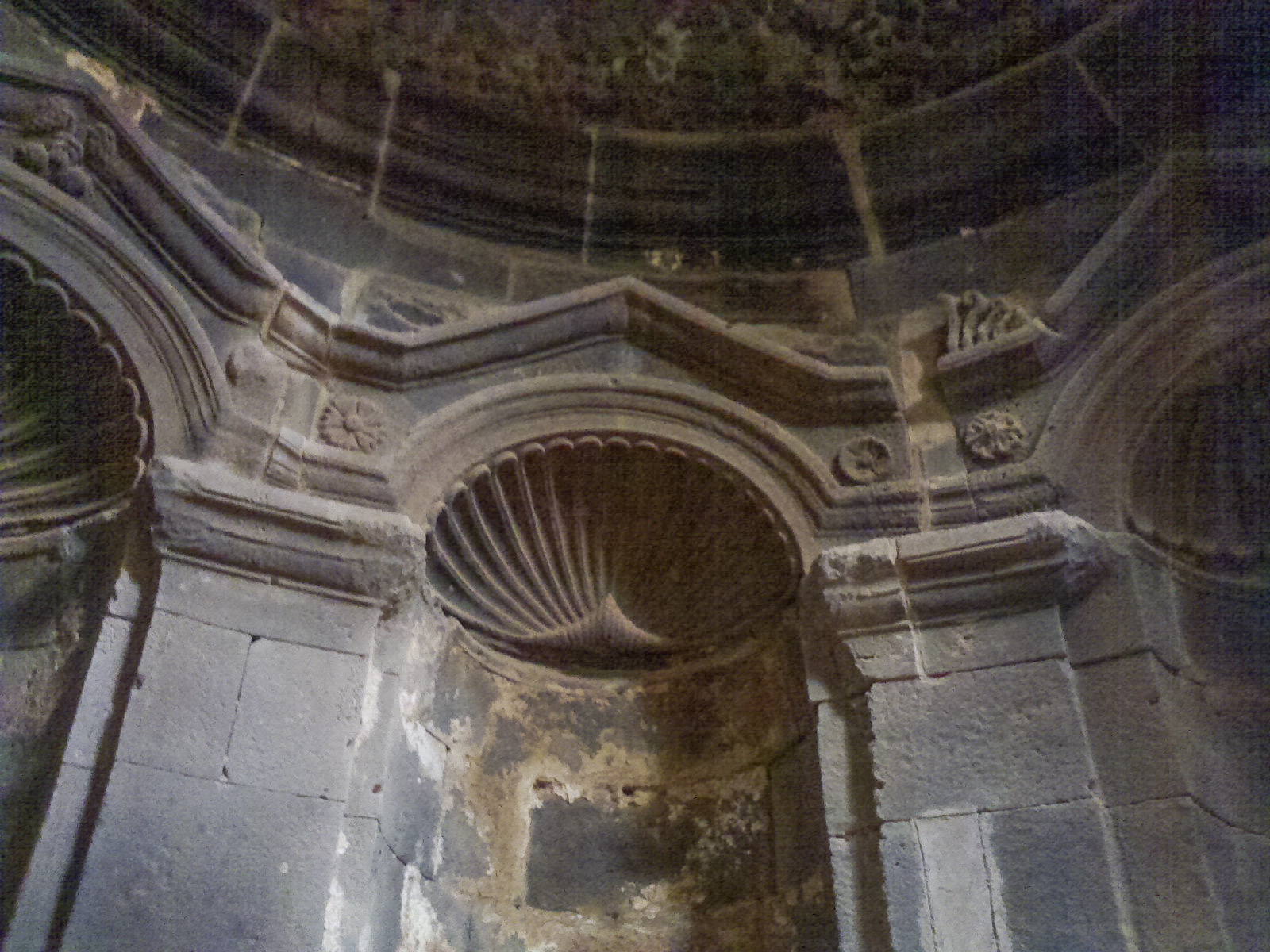
Ornamintation inside an ancient building

Ancient building

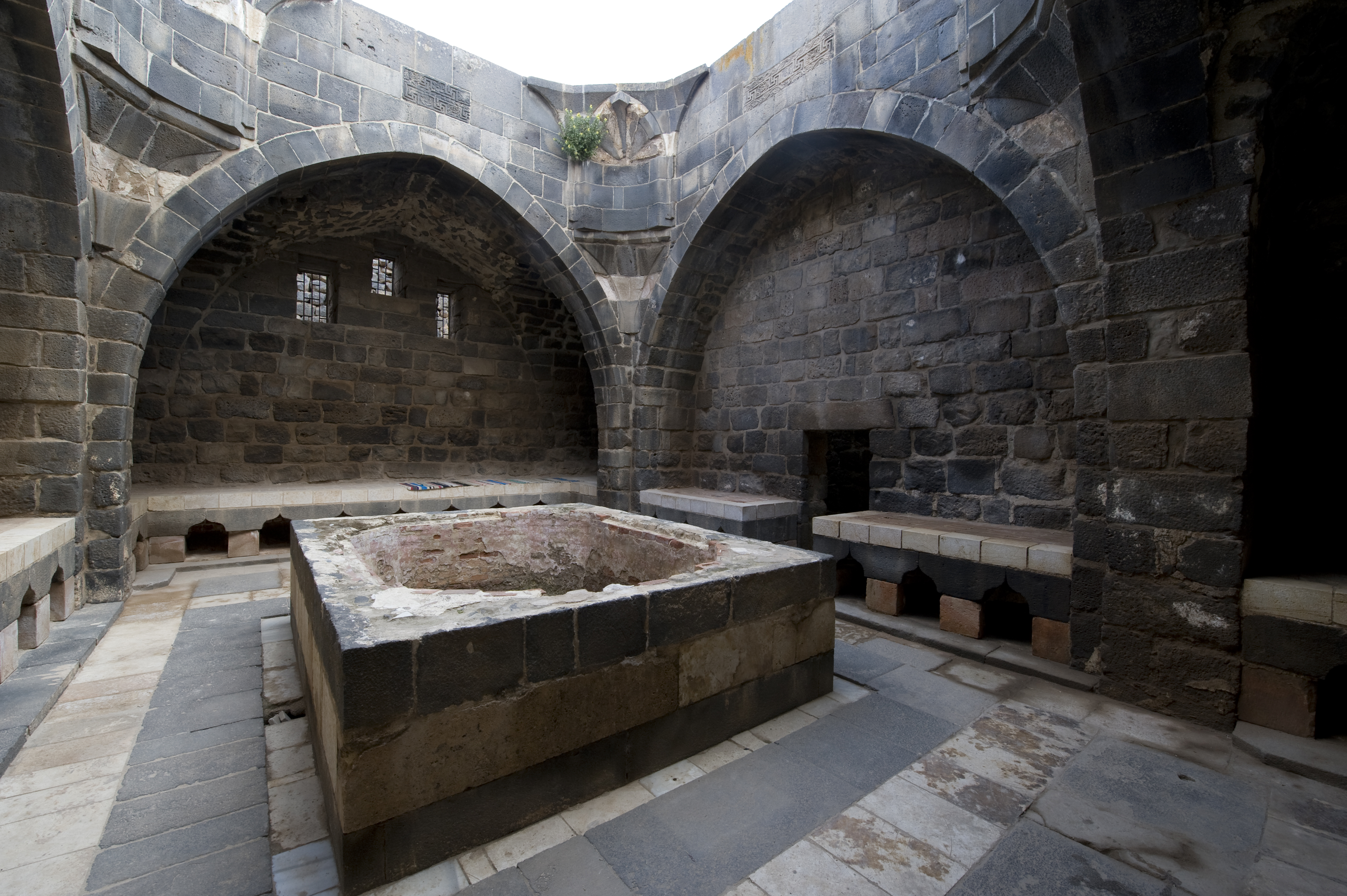
Bosra mosque

== Climate ==
Bosra has a cold semi-arid climate (Köppen climate classification BSk). Rainfall is higher in winter than in summer. The average annual temperature in Bosra is 16.4 °C (61.5 °F). About 247 mm (9.72 in) of precipitation falls annually.

Climate data for Bosra
Month	Jan	Feb	Mar	Apr	May	Jun	Jul	Aug	Sep	Oct	Nov	Dec	Year
Mean daily maximum °C (°F)	11.8 (53.2)	13.5 (56.3)	16.9 (62.4)	21.9 (71.4)	27.1 (80.8)	30.7 (87.3)	31.9 (89.4)	32.3 (90.1)	30.6 (87.1)	26.7 (80.1)	20.1 (68.2)	13.9 (57.0)	23.1 (73.6)
Mean daily minimum °C (°F)	2.1 (35.8)	3.1 (37.6)	5.3 (41.5)	8.5 (47.3)	11.9 (53.4)	14.6 (58.3)	16.1 (61.0)	16.3 (61.3)	14.6 (58.3)	11.8 (53.2)	7.7 (45.9)	3.5 (38.3)	9.6 (49.3)
Average precipitation mm (inches)	52 (2.0)	53 (2.1)	42 (1.7)	15 (0.6)	6 (0.2)	0 (0)	0 (0)	0 (0)	0 (0)	10 (0.4)	22 (0.9)	47 (1.9)	247 (9.7)
Source: climate-data.org

== Demographics ==
In the late 1990s, Bosra had an estimated population of 12,000. Its population increased to 19,683 according to the 2004 census by the Syria Central Bureau of Statistics. The population of its metropolitan area was 33,839.

Bosra's inhabitants are predominantly Sunni Muslims and are mostly divided between seven major clans. The leading clan is the al-Miqdad whose members immigrated to Bosra from al-Suwayda in the mid-18th-century. During this era they also dominated the nearby villages of Ghasm, Maaraba and Samaqiyat. However, the oldest clan of Bosra are the Hamd, a largely fair-skinned people, many members of which have blond hair and blue eyes. They claim to be descendants of the ancient Roman governor of Bosra, although other townspeople believe they are of Crusader origins. Regarding land ownership, the Hamd clan owns around 1,000 hectares in the town while the al-Miqdad clan owns roughly 12,000. The latter's members were historically influential in the Hauran region and beyond, having had one of their own in the Ottoman parliament of Abdul Hamid II in Constantinople during the Young Turks period and in the Syrian parliament during the French Mandate period. As of the late 1990s, members of the al-Miqdad clan occupied the positions of mayor, the chief imam of the main al-Omari Mosque, the chief of the town's bureau of antiquities as well as manager of Bosra's carpet workshop and the owner of the principal coffeehouse. While their members traditionally resided in the eastern quarter of old Bosra, they are currently prevalent throughout the town.

Bosra also has a small Shia Muslim community of some fifty families. According to Palestinian American historian Hanna Batatu, the Shia inhabitants of Bosra were "relatively recent arrivals" and immigrated to the town from the city of Nabatieh in South Lebanon. Most of the working members of the Shia community are artisans or laborers. Batatu also asserts that social changes in Bosra since Syrian independence have led to tribal diffusion, with intermarriage between the clans and between the Sunni and Shia communities having increased significantly.

== Notable people ==
- Saint Timon the Deacon, 1st century, Christian proto-deacon and bishop of Bosra
- Beryllus of Bostra, 3rd century, Bishop
- Shimon ben Lakish, 3rd century, amora of the second generation and rabbi
- Titus of Bostra, fl. 4th century, Christian theologian
- Saint Antipater of Bostra, fl. 5th century, Christian bishop
- Bahira, c. 600, Assyrian monk
- Ibn Kathir (1301–1373), Islamic scholar

== Sources ==
- Batatu, H. (1999). Syria's Peasantry, the Descendants of Its Lesser Rural Notables, and Their Politics. Princeton University Press. ISBN 0691002541.
- Beattie, Andrew; Pepper, Timothy (2001). The Rough Guide to Syria. Rough Guides. ISBN 9781858287188.
- Buckingham, James Silk (1825). Travels among the Arab tribes inhabiting the countries east of Syria and Palestine. London: Longman, Hurst, Rees, Orme, Brown, and Green.
- Hütteroth, W.-D.; Abdulfattah, K. (1977). Historical Geography of Palestine, Transjordan and Southern Syria in the Late 16th Century. Erlanger Geographische Arbeiten, Sonderband 5. Erlangen, Germany: Vorstand der Fränkischen Geographischen Gesellschaft. ISBN 3-920405-41-2.*Meinecke, M. (1996). Patterns of Stylistic Changes in Islamic Architecture: Local Traditions Versus Migrating Artists. New York University Press. ISBN 9780814754924.
- Smail, R. C. (1956). Crusading Warfare 1097-1193. New York: Barnes & Noble Books. ISBN 1-56619-769-4.
- Strange, le, G. (1890). Palestine Under the Moslems: A Description of Syria and the Holy Land from A.D. 650 to 1500. Committee of the Palestine Exploration Fund.
