= Telephone numbers in Syria =

- Country: Syria
- Continent: Asia
- Regulator: Syrian Telecom
- Numbering plan type: Closed
- NSN length: 7 (usually)
- Country code: +963
- International access: 00
- Long-distance: 0

Telephone numbers in Syria, lists the telephone numbering and dialing conventions in Syria.

== Dialing conventions ==
- For dialing a number from a land line to the land line in the same area (city), only the local number of destination is needed.
- For dialing a number from a land line to the land line in another area (city), a zero followed by area code of destination and the local number of destination is needed.
- For dialing a number from a land line to a mobile number, a zero followed by mobile provider 2 digit code and the destination number is needed.
- For dialing a number from a mobile phone to a land line number, a zero followed by area code of destination and the local number of destination is needed.
- For dialing a number from a mobile phone to another mobile phone, a zero followed by mobile provider 2 digit code and the destination number is needed.

== Mobile phones ==
There are three mobile phone operators and one landline Operator in Syria:

- Syriatel: 93, 98, 99.
- MTN Syria: 94, 95, 96.
- Wafa Telecom: 91, 92 (defunct)

== Fixed line ==
- Syrian Telecom: The Area Codes:

By area code

- Damascus and rural areas: 11
- Al-Quneitura: 14
- Daraa: 15
- As-Suweyda': 16
- Aleppo: 21
- Ar-Raqqa: 22
- Idlib: 23
- Homs: 31
- Hamah: 33
- Latakia: 41
- Tartous: 43
- Deir Az-Zour: 51
- Al-Hasakah: 52

By area

- Al-Hasakah: 52
- Al-Quneitura: 14
- Aleppo: 21
- Ar-Raqqa: 22
- As-Suweyda': 16
- Damascus: 11
- Daraa: 15
- Deir Az-Zour: 51
- Hamah: 33
- Homs: 31
- Idlib: 23
- Latakia: 41
- Tartous: 43

== See also ==
- Communications in Syria
