= Timeline of the Syrian civil war (January–April 2011) =

Protests began in Syria as early as 26 January 2011, and erupted on 15 March 2011 with a "Day of Rage" protest generally considered to mark the start of a nationwide uprising. The Syrian government's reaction to the protests became violent on 16 March, and deadly on 18 March, when four unarmed protesters were killed in Daraa.

For the background of those protests, see: Background of the Syrian protests (2011).

== January–February 2011 ==
- 26 or 28 January: In the large northern city of Al-Hasakah, a man, Hasan Ali Akleh, soaks himself with gasoline and sets himself on fire, in the same way Tunisian Mohamed Bouazizi had in Tunis on 17 December 2010. According to eyewitnesses, the action was "a protest against the Syrian government".
- 28 January – An evening demonstration was held in Raqqa, to complain about the killing of two soldiers of Kurdish descent.
- 31 January: Syrian President Bashar al-Assad criticizes Israel's external role in its domestic affairs
- 2 February: Suhair Atassi leads a sit-in Bab Tuma to protest "systematic looting and the continuing monopoly of Syria's two mobile phone operators, MTN and Syriatel." A group of 20 people in civilian clothing beat and dispersed 15 people who had been holding a candlelight vigil at Bab Tuma in Damascus for Egyptian demonstrators, Human Rights Watch reported.
- 3 February: Syrian opposition groups call on Facebook and Twitter for a "day of rage" on Friday 4 February. This does not lead to protests in Syria on 4 February. A "Day of Rage" was called for in Syria from 4–5 February on social media sites Facebook and Twitter. Protesters demanded governmental reform. Most protests took place outside of Syria, and were small. The protests were expected to begin on 4 February, as social media mobilised the Syrian people for rallies demanding freedom, human rights, and the end to the country's state of emergency. Protests were also scheduled for 5 February in front of the parliament in Damascus, and at Syrian embassies internationally. Al Jazeera reported increased security for the planned "Days of Rage."
- 4 February: Syrian protesters call for a day of anger against the government.
- 5 February: In Al-Hasakah, hundreds of people demonstrate for political reform and an end to emergency law. When hundreds of protesters in Al-Hasakah participated in a mass demonstration, calling for al-Assad's departure, Syrian authorities arrested dozens, and another demonstration was quickly triggered. Suhair Atassi, who runs the banned Jamal Atassi Forum, called for political reforms and the reinstatement of civil rights, as well as for an end to the emergency law that has been in place since 1962. However, no protests occurred on either date. After the failure of attempts to arrange a "Day of Rage," Al Jazeera described the country as "a kingdom of silence". It identified the key factors underlying Syrian stability as the country's strict security measures, the popularity of President Bashar al-Assad, and fear of potential sectarian violence in the aftermath of a government ouster (akin to neighbouring Iraq).
- 17 February: A spontaneous demonstration broke out outside the Al-Hamidiyah Souq market in Damascus to protest a police beating of a shop keeper. Several men gathered and blocked a road, while chanting that "The Syrian people will not be humiliated". An eyewitness estimated that there were more than 1,500 demonstrators. Secret police officers arrived on the scene quickly, along with several government officials and finally Syria's interior minister, who dispersed the demonstrators, took the shop owner into his car, and promised an investigation. A couple of hours later, several videos of the events were posted on YouTube.
- 23 February: Syria's justice minister defends the state of emergency by pointing at the state of war with Israel. A proposal of one parliament member to evaluate the harsh emergency laws was voted down with 249 against one MP. During a routine session of the Syrian Parliament, a member proposed that harsh emergency laws be reviewed. The issue was not scheduled for discussion, and its introduction came as a surprise. A pro-government official who was at the session recalled it with anger. The proposal was rapidly quashed, when the speaker put the proposed review to a vote in the chamber, but none of the other 249 MPs supported it.

== 1–17 March ==
- 6 March: In the southern city of Daraa, fifteen teenagers were arrested for writing "الشعب يريد إسقاط النظام" – ("the people want the regime to fall" on walls across the city. The military police tortured them, or had carried them handcuffed out of their classroom.

A number of boys under 15 years of age were arrested in Daraa, for writing on the walls of the city a slogan of the 2010–11 Arab uprisings that: "the people want to overthrow the regime". In Lebanon, four brothers, all of them Syrian opposition activists, went missing shortly after passing out flyers in front of the Syrian embassy in Beirut, calling for a demonstration to oppose Syria's government. TIME said that the commitment could still be found among the Syrian youth, but that what was needed was a starting point. Ribal al-Assad said that it was almost time for Syria to be the next domino.

- 7 March: One day before the 48th anniversary of the 8 March 1963 coup d'état, which led to a permanent state of emergency in force ever since, thirteen political prisoners in Syria went on hunger strike, demanding an end to political arrests and the restitution of rights that have been removed from civil and political life.
- 7–13 March: Syrian political prisoners went on a hunger strike to protest against "political detentions and oppression" in Syria. They demanded an end to political arrests, the removal of injustices, and the restitution of rights that had been removed from civil and political life.
- 10 March: Dozens of Syrian Kurds started hunger strike in solidarity with those of 7 March.

Dozens of jailed Kurds in Syria, from the Yakiti party and from the Democratic Union, started a hunger strike in solidarity with other activists who had also initiated hunger strikes in a prison near Damascus three days earlier. Human Rights Watch reacted to the disappearance of Syrian activists in Lebanon four days earlier, indicating that it feared that Lebanon is "back to doing Syria's dirty job". The Syrian Foreign Ministry stated that Syria was monitoring with high concern "the tragic developments in the brotherly country of Libya". Syrian newspaper Al-Watan said that the Syrian government welcomed the fall of Mubarak's regime, and was looking forward to a new leadership that does not "cover for Israeli violations". The Reform Party of Syria asserted that "al-Assad is sending arms to Gaddafi to kill his people with".

- 11 March: Reuters reports ‘a large shipment of weapons and explosives and night-vision goggles … in a truck coming from Iraq’ carrying 'dozens of grenades and pistols as well as rifles and ammunition belts’ is seized at the southern Tanaf crossing near Jordan. The driver said the weapons had been loaded in Baghdad and he was to be paid $5,000 to deliver them to Syria.
- 12 March: Thousands of Syrian Kurds protested in Qamishli and in al-Hasakah, on the day of Kurdish martyrs, commemorating the 30 Kurds that were killed by police after riots broke out at a football game in March 2004.

Thousands of Syrian Kurds in Qamishli and in al-Hasakah protested on the day of Kurdish martyr, which is an annual event since 2004, when many Syrian kurds died in anti-government demonstrations.

- 13 March: Kamal Hussein Cheikho, a Kurdish member of the Committee for the Defence of Democratic Liberties and Human Rights in Syria (CDF), was released on bail of 500 Syrian pounds ($10). He is still facing charges for allegedly publishing material harmful to the country.
- Tuesday 15 March, dubbed "day of rage" by activists, hundreds staged protests in Damascus and Aleppo, calling for democratic reforms. The protest in Damascus was violently dispersed, six protesters were detained by security forces according to a witness speaking to the BBC.

Simultaneous demonstrations took place in major cities across Syria. Thousands of protestors gathered in al-Hasakah, Daraa, Deir ez-Zor, and Hama. There were some clashes with security, according to reports from dissident groups. In Damascus, a smaller group of 200 men grew spontaneously to about 1,500 men. Damascus has not seen such uprising since the 1980s. The official Facebook page called "Syrian Revolution 2011" showed pictures of supportive demonstrations in Cairo, Nicosia, Helsinki, Istanbul and Berlin. There were also unconfirmed news that Syrian revolution supporters of Libyan descent, stormed into the Syrian Embassy in Paris.
Another recently released political figure, Suhair Atassi, became an unofficial spokesperson for the "Syrian revolution", when she was interviewed by dozens of Arab and international media channels regarding the uprising. There were reports of 6 arrested in Damascus. Atassi paid tribute to "the Syrian people who took the initiative ahead of the opposition," recalling the popular uprisings that shook Tunisia and Egypt After the first day of the uprising there were reports about approximately 3000 arrests and a few "martyrs", but there are no official figures on the number of deaths.

- 16 March: Demonstrations took place in Marjeh Square in Damascus, near the Interior Ministry, calling for release of political prisoners. Police threatened them with batons and arrested scores of protesters.

In Daraa, protests started in the al-Balad neighborhood, in reaction to the imprisonment 15 local teenagers by military police (see 6 March).
Also in Aleppo, Al-Hasakah, Deir ez-Zor and Hama protestors gathered, sources in Syria said; reportedly there were some clashes with security forces. The state news service SANA called the protests the work of outside agitators.
Syrian authorities forcibly dispersed a crowd composed of 200 demonstrators in front of the Syrian Interior Ministry. Al Arabiya reported that the protesters were a mix of activists and jurists, writers, journalists, young academics, and family members to people detained in Syrian prisons. Several security officers managed to infiltrate themselves in demonstrations at different places and started shouting slogans declaring their love and loyalty to President Bashar al-Assad. The security forces arrested a number of protestors, Al Jazeera reported 25, while Al Arabiya said 32 including activist and lawyer Suhair Atassi and Kamal Cheikho, an activist who had been released two days earlier. World Organisation Against Torture published list of arrests and demanded immediate release of them.
Mohamed al-Ali, a spokesman for the Syrian Interior Authority denied that any demonstrations took place in Syria and said that the Facebook-campaign has proved unsuccessful. According to the spokesperson, the "claimed protests" consisted of a bunch of people who were "hiding" among the already packed souq and tried to make it look like a demonstration. In another statement, he finally acknowledged the protest but then turned it around by saying that the demonstration which was outside the Interior Authority's building was actually in support of President Bashar al-Assad.

- 17 March: Protests that had begun the previous day in Daraa continued.

== 18–25 March ==
- Friday 18 March: Named "Friday of Dignity" (Arabic: جمعة الكرامة) by some protesters, after a call on Facebook page "The Syrian Revolution 2011" protests for freedom and democracy and against corruption were held in several cities after Islamic Friday prayers, including Damascus, Daraa, Homs, Baniyas, Qamishli and Deir ez-Zor. It was called the most serious unrest to take place in Syria for decades.

In Daraa, possibly thousands of locals gathered – peacefully, according to some reports, but, according to a contemporary report by Israel's Arutz Sheva, armed – and marched through the city, chanting: "God, Syria, Freedom" and slogans against Rami Makhlouf, who is a cousin of al-Assad accused of benefitting from regime corruption. They demanded the release of the teenagers detained since 6 March and called for democracy, greater political freedom and an end to corruption. An amateur video purportedly shows watercannons being used in Daraa to disperse demonstrators. Security forces opened fire on the crowd, killing between two and four. The Syrian government reacted by saying that "infiltrators had caused chaos and riots" in Daraa.
In Damascus, about 200 people tried to march from the Umayyad Mosque, chanting: "God, Syria and freedom only". They were reportedly either attacked by a pro-government group, or forcefully dispersed by plainclothes police wielding batons, and 30 were arrested.
In Homs, 2,000 gathered by the Khaled bin al Waleed mosque; they were assaulted and some were arrested. In Baniyas hundreds of protesters gathered, and were repressed violently.

- 19 March: Funerals were held in Deraa for two protesters killed the day before, drawing up to 20,000 demonstrators who chanted: "The blood of our martyrs won’t be forgotten" and "God, Syria, freedom." Security forces intervened, firing tear gas and live ammunition at the mourners, killing between one and six protesters and injuring 100. Witnesses reported that the gas seemed more toxic than ordinary tear gas. At these funerals, opposition leaders demanded from the authorities the release of political prisoners. On 20 March, the government offered to release the students detained on 6 March as a concession.

Protests were also in three other cities. The Syrian League for Human Rights reported that 10 women jailed on 16 March after a rally outside the Interior Ministry in Damascus had begun a hunger strike.

- 20 March, President Assad sent a delegation to offer condolences to the families of those killed in the clashes in Daraa. Thousands gathered in and around the Omari mosque in Daraa, chanting their demands: release of political prisoners, abolition of emergency law, and: "No fear after today". As the protests heated, the police sprayed tear gas, further angering the protesters who started tearing down a poster of Assad; then the police opened fire into the crowd, witnesses said.

Protesters then burned the local Ba'ath Party headquarters, the town’s main courthouse and a branch of the SyriaTel phone company owned by Rami Makhlouf, a cousin of President Assad, a symbol of corruption for the anti-government protesters and considered Syria’s richest businessman. On the same day, seven police officers and four demonstrators were killed in Daraa.
Thousands took to the streets in the city of Daraa for a third day, shouting slogans against the country's emergency law. One person was killed and scores injured as security forces opened fire on protesters. The courthouse, the Ba'ath party headquarters in the city, and Rami Makhlouf's Syriatel building were all set on fire.

- 21 March, in Daraa, thousands brought the one, killed on Saturday 19, to his grave. They shouted: "God, Syria, Freedom; the people demand the overcoming of corruption" and: "We are no longer afraid". To calm that situation, president Assad ordered the release of the teenagers detained since 6 March and removed provincial governor Faisal Kulthum from his office. Troops were sent to Daraa. Also hundreds demonstrated in the agricultural town Jasim near Daraa.

Protests started to spread further across the country. Thousands of people took to the streets in Daraa and troops were sent to the city. Hundreds of people protested in Jassem and there were reports of protests in Banias, Homs and Hama.

It was reported that an 11-year-old boy had died of wounds suffered when Syrian security forces dispersed a protest rally in Daraa, and meanwhile, the Beirut-based al Akhbar newspaper accused Lebanese caretaker Prime Minister Saad Hariri's Future Movement of paying the Syrian protesters something that which he immediately denied.

Demonstrators in Daraa set fire to the ruling Baath Party’s headquarters and other government buildings. Police officers fired live ammunition into the crowds, killing at least one and wounding scores of others, witnesses said. al-Assad made some conciliatory gestures, but crowds continued to gather in and around the Omari mosque in Dara’a, chanting their demands: the release of all political prisoners; trials for those who shot and killed protesters; the abolition of Syria’s 48-year emergency law; more freedoms; and an end to pervasive corruption.

- 22 March, in Daraa, hundreds of people had gathered around the Omari mosque, the focus of the protests since 18 March, to prevent government troops from storming it. Security forces opened fire, killing four protesters, human rights activists said. An AFP photographer said he was beaten by security forces in Daraa who seized his equipment.

Louay Hussein, a political prisoner from 1984 to 1991 and now a prominent rights leader, who had been supporting protesters in Daraa, was arrested at his home in the Sehnaya district near Damascus by Syrian authorities. Protesters also gathered today in the southern towns of Inkhil, Nawa, Al-Sanamayn and Jasim and rural areas around Damascus.

In Daraa, gunfire and tear gas was reported near the Omari mosque, which is a major gathering spot for protesters.

An AFP photographer and cameraman were beaten by Syrian security forces in Daraa and had their equipment seized.

Navi Pillay, the UN High Commissioner for Human Rights, called for an investigation into the deaths of six protesters who had been killed by Syrian security forces in March.

- Early on 23 March in Daraa, Syrian Army police presence was reinforced, and confronted protesters gathered around the Omari mosque (see also 22 March) in the city center, dispersing the crowd with tear gas and live ammunition, killing 5 or 6 according to early activists' and news reports. An Associated Press reporter heard semi-automatic gunfire.

One of those killed was a doctor, whose funeral was that same afternoon. Thousands attended that funeral after which security forces again fired on demonstrators, according to the reports. During the entire day, Associated Press reported 15 dead, but a later hospital communication said that at least 37 people had been killed. Mobile phone connections to Daraa were cut, and checkpoints in town were guarded by uniformed soldiers and plainclothes security agents with rifles.
Syrian state media however reported a police raid on the Omari mosque during which guns, grenades, ammunition and money had been captured, and "an armed gang" attacking an ambulance killing a doctor, a medical worker and a driver, after which security forces faced the aggressors and managed to shoot a few, or four, of them.
The Syrian government has blamed the unrest since 15 March on Israeli agents and Palestinian extremists and other ‘saboteurs’ and ‘infiltrators’.
There were reports that at least 15 protesters had been killed by security forces in southern Syria. At least six people were killed by security forces near Al-Omari mosque in Daraa, including a doctor and a paramedic. Witnesses reported that a 12-year-old girl had been killed by security forces near the mosque.

Mobile phone connections to Daraa were cut during the day and checkpoints were set up throughout the city and guarded by soldiers. Security forces were also preventing ambulances from entering the city centre, where the mosque is located.

On the evening of the 23rd there were reports that Syrian security forces had opened fire on hundreds of young protesters who had been marching towards Daraa.

- 24 March, witnesses reported 20,000 Syrians in Daraa at the funerals of nine protesters killed 23 March, chanting: "The blood of martyrs is not spilt in waste!"

Around 20,000 protesters marched at the funerals of nine protesters killed by security forces in Daraa. Syrian Human Rights Committee reported that number of deaths rose to 32, while AFP reported that more than 100 people were killed by police gunfire in Daraa. Syria freed writer Louai Hussein, who was detained earlier this week for posting a petition online demanding the right to freedom of expression

- Friday 25 March, early on the day, 100,000 people in Daraa attended an anti-government demonstration, according to a political activist. Later, as thousands gathered and marched to the main square in the city after the funeral of five protesters killed this week, they chanted (against the President's brother): "Maher you coward. Send your troops to liberate the Golan", said a Reuters witness. These thousands moved to the governor's building where they burned a picture of Bashar al-Assad and toppled a statue of Hafez al-Assad (the former president), a witness said. Then, he said, armed men on the roof of the officer's club started firing at the crowd; the website of Neue Zürcher Zeitung reports that "apparently" 20 people were killed. Website Aljazeera asserts that protesters also burned the home of the governor in Daraa.

There were also protests in Latakia, Homs, Damascus, Hama, Deir ez-Zor and Raqqa. Activists reported one or two demonstrators in Latakia shot dead by security forces or killed by a face off between protesters and pro-government supporters, and one shot dead in Homs.
The Syrian state news agency reported an armed gang in the southern town of Al-Sanamayn attacking security forces which resulted in the death of several attackers. A YouTube video showed seven bloody bodies in Al-Sanamayn lying on stretchers, three clearly with gunshot wounds; the claims that 10 to 20 were killed there by security forces were not independently confirmed.
In Damascus there were pro-Assad rallies: hundreds of cars plastered with pictures of President Assad and crammed full of youths descended on the central Umayya Square; huge pro-Assad rallies drove around Damascus waving Syrian flags and photos of Assad; thousands chanted their loyalty in support of Assad. But also hundreds of protesters in Damascus expressed their solidarity with the demonstrators killed in Daraa on 23 March, crying out: "We sacrifice our blood, our souls for you in Daraa".
After new online calls to a big demonstration after Friday prayers named "Friday of Glory" (Arabic: جمعة العزة), tens of thousands took to the streets in protest around the nation, defying a state that has once again demonstrated its willingness to use lethal force. Military troops opened fire during protests in the southern part of Syria and killed peaceful demonstrators, according to witnesses and news reports, hurtling the strategically important nation into turmoil.

There were reports that at least 20 people were killed in uprising in Daraa which drew over 100,000 people. A witness said that thousands of people chanted against the president's brother: "Maher you coward. Send your troops to liberate the Golan," A statue of Hafez al-Assad was dismantled and set on fire. The governor's home was also set on fire.

There were also reports of protests in Damascus, Deir ez-Zor, Homs, Latakia and Raqqa. There were reports that one demonstrator had been shot dead by security forces in Latakia and another had been killed in Homs. There were reports that dozens of protesters had died across the country.

A witness said that in Sanamayn, security forces killed 20 people. The official Syrian news agency said that an "armed gang" had attacked army headquarters there, that "resulted in the deaths of several attackers." The death of a civilian in Homs was blamed on an "armed group".

Most chants called for solidarity with Daraa and with the people killed there, for freedom, and against government corruption.

In Tafas, 3 protesters were killed by security forces. In Kafr Amim, Idlib there were a fire at the Baath Party headquarters.

The Sunni cleric Sheikh Yusuf al-Qaradawi gave a sermon in Qatar in which he stated: "Today the train of revolution has arrived at a station that it was destined to reach, the Syrian station. It isn't possible for Syria to detach itself from the history of the Arab nation." Also Syrian Salafi cleric in Saudi exile Sheikh Adnan al-Arour advised the youth of the revolution to follow the Egyptian example and endure violence without responding in kind. He voiced hope that the president will intervene and form a dialogue committee to address legitimate grievances.

AFP reported that Syrian opposition leaders-in-exile called in Paris for the downfall of President Bashar al-Assad, asking France to maintain pressure on the Syrian leader to "halt the killing of innocents." A YouTube video showed protesters packed into Ar-Rifai mosque in Damascus and chanting "God, Syria, and freedom alone.". A leaked YouTube video purportedly filmed in the Syrian city of Homs shows security forces changing outfits to look like civilians in order to provoke anti-government protesters, reports have said.

17 people were killed in demonstration on way to Daraa, while 40 were killed near Omari Mosque, 25 died in al-Sanameen in Homs, 4 in Latakia, 3 in Damascus.

== 26–31 March ==
- 26 March: Activists and human rights groups said, according to Al Jazeera and AFP news agency and The Washington Post and Reuters, that the authorities freed about 260 or ‘more than 200’ or ‘70’ (political) prisoners (and (additionally) 42 or 14 Kurdish detainees); two of those four sources specified that most of those 200 or 260 released prisoners were Islamists.

Some activists and/or Al Jazeera considered this an attempt to appease the increasingly angry demonstrators; Rihawi, head of the Syrian Human Rights League, said that releasing those prisoners was "a good start".
In both Latakia 26 March and Tafas (south of Damascus) 26 or 27 March, residents attending funerals (of demonstrators shot dead Friday) set fire to the local Baath Party building and a police station. This resulted in Latakia in three people reportedly killed after a clash with security forces. Government forces were deployed in Latakia.
In Daraa, hundreds staged a silent sit-in near a mosque, security forces fired tear gas on them, witnesses reported.

200 political prisoners were released.

In the cities of Latakia and Tafas, Baath party buildings and police stations were set on fire. Armed gangs were blamed by the authorities for attempting to destabilize the country. The Syrian Arab News Agency (SANA), the government controlled news agency, claimed that an armed group seized rooftops in many areas in Latakia, opening fire on citizens and security forces personnel. Two people were killed, and thousands more protested in Daraa. Two U.S. citizens were reported to be in the custody of Syrian authorities. Mohammed Radwan, 32, a dual citizen of the U.S. and Egypt, and Pathik "Tik" Root, 21, a student at Middlebury College in Vermont, were said to have been detained for involvement in anti-government uprising.

The Grand Mufti of Syria, Ahmad Bader Hassoun, said "Any citizen has the right to protest and call for freedom, but I will tell you, all those behind the bloodshed will be penalized. There are no army officials who opened fire at protesters, they only retaliated out of self-defense. After what happened, there should be reconciliation between the people. There are some corrupters in the country and the corrupters should be penalized". As a result of what happened in Homs on Friday, Iyad Ghazal, the governor of Homs was dismissed from his post.

- 27 March: Early on the day the Syrian state news agency said that armed gangs had attacked neighbourhoods in Latakia, firing from rooftops. Anti-government protesters however accused government forces of opening fire on them. Activists said some demonstrators set fire to a Ba’ath Party building and attacked businesses. The state news agency said later that in the violence 10 or 12 people had died, including residents, "armed elements" and security personnel.

Syrian officials reported that 12 people were killed in Latakia. An Al Jazeera clip on YouTube records the imam of the Ar-Rahman Mosque in Latakia telling an Al-Jazeera broadcaster that a massacre is occurring in the city.

Buthaina Shaaban, the president's media adviser, stated that the emergency law would be lifted, without giving any indication of when that will be. She also said that the President will appear publicly to address the Syrians and to give official statements of the steps that will be taken by the government. The Reuters news agency reported that two of its journalists are missing. They were last heard of from the night before, when they were expected to cross into Lebanon from Syria. Journalists Sobhi Hasan and Zaher Alamin were rearrested.

- 28 March: The Reuters news agency reported that its two missing journalists, both Lebanese nationals, had been in the custody of Syrian authorities since 26 March, but were released and they had returned to Lebanon.

Kuwaiti Sheikh Nabeel al-Awadi and Syrian Sheikh Issam al-Attar showed their support for Syrian anti-government uprising.

- 29 March: After a government appeal on 28 March, today tens of thousands Syrians demonstrated in support of President Assad, in Damascus, Aleppo, Homs, Hama and Al-Hasakah. AP news agency reported that bank employees and other workers were allowed two hours and school children were given the day off to attend these demonstrations. Website Ynetnews, part of the Israeli Yedioth Media Group, mentioned however "hundreds of thousands of Assad supporters" in the streets; and the Syria-based website of Day Press (Dp-news) mentioned "millions of Syrian citizens" rallying "expressing loyalty to the motherland".

Also on 29 March, President Assad accepted the resignation of the 32-member cabinet under prime minister Naji al-Otari who resigned in reaction to the protests. However, any Syrian government has little power in Syria where power is concentrated in Assad and his family and in the security apparatus.

Hundreds of thousands demonstrated in support of President Bashar al-Assad in Damascus, Aleppo, Hasaka, Homs, Tartous and Hama. The Syrian newspaper Al-Watan reported that a major cabinet reshuffle was coming, and later that day, President Assad accepted the official resignation of the government led by Muhammad Naji al-Otari, while the latter will serve as caretaker prime minister until a new government is selected and officially announced.

Syrian actor Jamal Suliman announced via BBC that Syrian artists released a statement regarding the ongoing uprising. The artists voiced the importance of "implementing reforms" and the artists’ willingness to "stand by the political system in a serious and reform journey" as well as standing with the people.

- 30 March: In a televised address before parliament, President Bashar al-Assad's first address to the nation since the large protests and their crackdown this March began, Assad said that Syria was going through a "test of unity", while "our enemies are targeting Syria". "The enemies" [of Syria] in their "conspiracy" are promoting "Israel's plans" or the "Israeli agenda". "Conspirators" have tried to reinforce sectarianism to incite hatred and "bring down Syria", he said. "Foreign powers", while stirring up insurrection in a bid to destroy Syria, "adopt the principle of 'lie until you believe your lie'", Assad said. Also, Assad targeted social networking websites and pan-Arabic satellite television news channels. His speech was interrupted by sycophants declaring their undying love for the leader.

It was reported that Ayat Basma and Ezzat Baltaji two Reuters journalists had gone missing near Damascus.

President Assad made a speech blaming foreign conspirators for the cause of the uprising and declaring that the emergency law will not be lifted as previously confirmed by Shaaban and instead the lift will be put to studies for future application. A YouTube video of a CNN report shows Syrian State television footage of a woman allegedly attacking Syrian President Bashar al-Assad’s car following his speech on Wednesday.

Disappointed by the president's speech, protesters took to the street in Latakia, where they were fired on by police. Mass protests in Daraa to overthrow Syrian President Bashar al-Assad’s government following his speech and reports of five new deaths and total of 200 "martyrs" in Daraa since uprising started. The investigative judge in Damascus refused to release the activist Suhair Atassi and four others.

- 31 March (or 30 March but not during his television speech), President Assad promised an investigation into the possibility of replacing the emergency law that is in place since 1963 and into the issue of 150,000 Kurds in the region of Hassakah who have been disenfranchised since the 1962 census.

Two more Reuters journalists Suleiman al-Khalidi and Khaled al-Hariri disappeared in Syria. Syrian President Bashar al-Assad established a commission to study the termination of the emergency law in his country.

Syrian Arab News Agency (SANA) reported that President al-Assad issued a decree raising the wages of state employees. The decision will go into effect as of 1 April.

A London-based rights group close to the Muslim Brotherhood said Thursday 25 people were killed by security forces in Latakia, northwest of the country, in a "bloodbath."

== 1–15 April ==
By the end of March, the old neighbourhood al-Balad in Daraa with 15,000 residents (see 16 March) was locked and surrounded by the Syrian Army. When their supplies ran out in April–May the residents of al-Balad were facing famine. By early April, whole Daraa was surrounded by automatic weapons, surface-to-air missiles and tanks, and largely sealed off by the military.

- Friday 1 April, after Friday prayers, thousands of protesters in several cities demonstrated themselves to be unsatisfied with, and unimpressed by, the vague promises of reform President Assad had made the previous day (see above).

In Douma, a working-class northern suburb of Damascus, citizens gathered on the Municipality Square, hundreds according to Syrian officials, 2,000 according to witnesses who said they were chanting: "Freedom, freedom" when police opened fire on them. At least eleven people were killed. Officials however said, an armed group had taken to the rooftops and fired on both citizens and security forces.
In Daraa, according to an eyewitness 5,000 people demonstrated, shouting: "We want freedom!" Hundreds tried to march from Daraa to the nearby city of Al-Sanamayn when police fired on them, killing five marchers, reports say.
In Homs, according to the state news agency, an armed group fired on citizens, killing one girl.
In Damascus, at the main Umayyad Mosque, government supporters let worshippers out the gates only in small groups, so no crowd could gather, witnesses said. The state-run News Agency denied that any clashes between protesters and security forces had occurred today in Syria.

After online calls for a "Friday of martyrs" (Arabic: جمعة الشهداء), thousands of protesters emerged from Friday's prayers and took to the streets in multiple cities around Syria. Security forces opened fire on about 1,000 protesters in the suburb of Damascus, Douma, killing eight. In Damascus, hundreds gathered in Al Rifai mosque to protest after Friday prayers; however, government forces reportedly sealed the mosque and attacked those who tried to leave. Further south, in a small city outside Daraa, a demonstrator was killed during a protest there.

- 2 April, in Daraa and Homs 21 people were arrested according to the Syrian Observatory for Human Rights, presumably because of their protesting the previous day.

Over 2,000 people protested in support of Assad in the village of Buq'ata in the Israeli controlled Golan Heights, while Syrian security forces arrested more than 20 people in Daraa and Homs, according to a human rights group.
Prime Minister of Turkey Recep Erdogan said he will put pressure on Assad to create reforms.

External videos
- Unknown Gunmen Filmed at Syria Demo (YouTube: Associated Press.); 8 April 2011. Retrieved 9 April 2011.

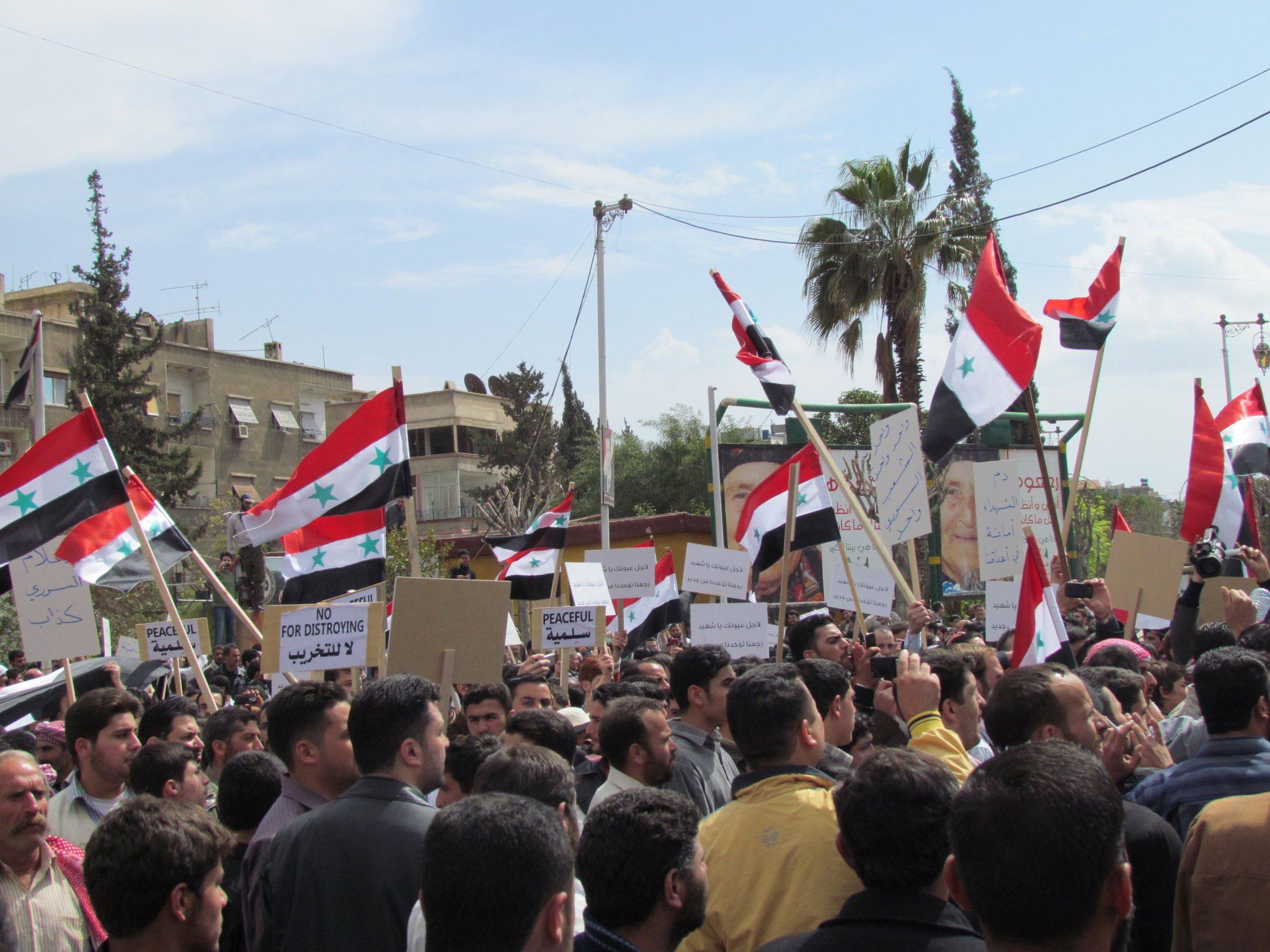
Protests in Douma, a Damascus suburb, 8 April 2011

- 3 April: Syrian authorities released 50-year-old Reuters photographer Khaled al-Hariri after six days in detention.

Assad appointed Adel Safar as the new Syrian prime minister and charged him with the task of forming a new government.

- c. 3–7 April: Quickly after the deadly clash in Douma on 1 April, a high-level Baath party official was sent to Douma to talk to local leaders. Arrangements were made for corpses to be returned to family, injured to be treated, detainees to be freed, and absence of security forces during the funerals. This seems to have stemmed the violence in Douma temporarily, until 15 April.
- 4 April: Assad appointed Mohammad Khaled al-Hannus as the new governor of Daraa. Meanwhile, thousands of Syrians marched through the shuttered streets of Douma, just outside Damascus, chanting antigovernment slogans as they buried at least eight victims of the crackdown on protests held 1 April.

Syrian Arab News Agency (SANA), the state news agency, reported that 8 prisoners were killed in a fire that was set by one of the prisoners in Latakia prison. Two police men were injured by the fire.

- 5 April: AFP reported the start of "Martyrs Week" (Arabic: أسبوع الشهداء), a series of rallies organized by the Syrian Revolution 2011 Facebook group in honor of those killed in recent security crackdowns on pro-reform demonstrations. According to state television, two policemen in rural Damascus were shot to death by unidentified perpetrators. 15 people died in protests in Kafr Batna in Syria.
- 6 April: Syria's education minister today allowed primary school teachers to wear the full Islamic face veil, niqab, again, which had been banned last July, by which measure hundreds of school teachers had been displaced from their jobs, who now may return to their jobs; this, apparently as accommodation towards many angry conservative Muslims. Today Syria also closed its only casino, in Damascus.

Assad's government offered concessions to Sunnis and Kurds and that teachers would once again be allowed to wear the niqab. The government had also closed the country's only casino. Tens of thousands of Kurds residing in Syria will soon be granted Syrian citizenship.

The editor of Syrian government daily Teshreen said she is organizing talks with key opposition figures so that they can air their demands for political reforms. A politician close to the said that the Syrian parliament is preparing to adopt major reforms in May, including an end to emergency rule.

- 7 April: Of the 300,000 Syrian Kurds in region Hasakah who were registered as ‘foreigners’ or ‘stateless people’ as a result of a probably arbitrary stripping of their ancestors’ Syrian citizenship in 1962 (see also 31 March 2011), 220,000 today were granted "Syrian Arab Nationality".

Minor protests took place across Syria, but the majority of protesters prepared for large demonstrations planned for Friday.

- Friday 8 April, after Friday prayers, in Daraa security forces opened fire to disperse stone-throwing protesters, a witness told Al Jazeera. 27 demonstrators were killed, hospital sources and witnesses said. Protesters chanted: "The people want the overthrow of the regime". The wounded could not be picked up by ambulances because government security forces prevented them, according to Human Rights Watch after interviewing witnesses. The state-run news agency SANA however said, that "armed groups using live ammunition" during the protests killed 19 members of police and security forces and wounded 75.

In Harasta, a suburb of Damascus, 2,000 people protested, and on reaching a security forces roadblock mutual throwing of rocks escalated into 'plain clothes men' opening fire with guns. People who were shot and injured could not be reached by others because the forces continued firing, and doctors could not get wounded into the hospital because security forces didn't allow them, according to Human Rights Watch. Unconfirmed reports were that in three people were killed in Harasta.
In Homs two protesters were killed.
Amnesty International today had recorded 171 names of people killed since 18 March.
Mazen Darwish, an activist in Damascus, said about Assad’s 31 March’ pledges of investigations: "It is not about this problem or that problem; it’s about transforming Syria from dictatorship to democracy; (…) to open up political life, have free press and political parties and lift the emergency rule".
Protests were today also in Latakia, Tartus, Baniyas, Idlib and in other cities. In eastern Syria, thousands of ethnic Kurds demonstrated. In the northeastern city of Qamishli, Kurdish youth apparently rejected Assad’s attempt of overture to Kurds by releasing 48 Kurdish prisoners, when they chanted: "No Kurd, no Arab, Syrian people are one. We salute the martyrs of Daraa".

External videos
- Unknown Gunmen Filmed at Syria Demo (YouTube: Associated Press.); 8 April 2011. Retrieved 9 April 2011.

On the third Friday called "Friday of Resistance" (Arabic: جمعة الصمود), thousands of protesters took to streets in Daraa, Latakia, Tartus, Edlib, Baniyas, Qamishli, Homs and the Damascus suburb of Harasta, in the largest protest yet.

27 anti-government protesters were killed in Daraa and many other were wounded when security forces opened fire with rubber bullets and live rounds to disperse stone-throwing protesters. The clashes started when thousands of prayers staged rallies following the Friday prayers. In a telephone call one of the activists told the news agencies that demonstrators, starting from three mosques, have marched to the city's main court where they were confronted by security forces dressed in civilian clothing. A witness told Reuters he saw "snipers on roofs." It was also reported that another resident has seen "pools of blood and three bodies" in the Mahatta area of Daraa. The protesters have also smashed a stone statue of Bassel al-Assad, the brother of the current President of the country, and set fire to a Ba'ath Party outpost. The state-run Syrian Television reported that 19 police officers and members of the security forces have been killed in Daraa.

At least three people were killed in Damascus's suburb city of Harasta and two people were killed and dozens wounded in Homs, Syria's third largest city. A human rights group said 37 people killed in protests across the country on Friday.

- 9 April: Witnesses in the city of Daraa reported that Syrian security forces fired live ammunition and tear gas at thousands of protesters who had gathered for a mass funeral near a mosque. In Latakia, witnesses said Syrian security forces used live ammunition to disperse hundreds of people who gathered to protest. Another witness said water trucks had been brought in and were hosing down the streets to wash away blood.
- 10 April: In the area of the Baniyas port, apparently electricity, telephone lines and internet access were cut. After anti-government protests in Baniyas, pro-government gunmen and security forces killed four people, according to human rights activists. In response, an army unit was ambushed, with nine soldiers being killed, the government said.

Also on 10 April, president Assad met with Douma residents and gave his personal condolences to the neighbourhood over the deaths on 1 April.
The death toll of the previous day's events was up to 26 people in Daraa, 20 in the Homs neighborhood of Teldo and one in Baniyas. On 10 April's morning, militiamen alleged to be members of the shabbiha opened fire on demonstrators in front of the main mosquee of Baniyas, killing at least 4. Uprising also took place in Homs, Douma and Daraa. 9 soldiers of a unit of the Syrian army were killed in an armed ambush on a road near Baniyas, including two officers, while many others were injured.

- Between 10–12 April, in the town of Baida near Baniyas, hundreds of men were arrested.
- 11 April: during a protest at Damascus University, a student was shot and killed by security forces. Students in the Science faculty of Damascus University, located in the Baramkeh area in Damascus, began a demonstration in which they chanted for freedom and support of the people in Daraa and Baniyas. However, the Damascus University Dean of the Faculty of Science, Dr. Mohammad Said Mahasni, denied the reports, and said instead that a number of students gathered in front of the faculty, rejecting attempts of destabilizing Syrian national security, and chanting national slogans and support for Assad. In Baniyas, funerals for the 4 protesters who were shot down by the military led to a new demonstration, and security forces attacked the city until late at night.
- 12 April: The day started with a confirmation that one student was beaten to death by security forces during the demonstration at Damascus University one day earlier. Witnesses reported that the suburb of Bayda in Baniyas was surrounded by tanks, and ongoing gunfire by security forces had led to dozens of injuries, while neither ambulance cars nor necessary food-aid that had been sent from the nearby city Tartus were allowed to enter the village.
- 13 April: in Baida, many women demonstrated to demand that the detained men (see 10–12 April) be freed. Hundreds of women took part in a march demanding the release of 350 men arrested in town of Bayda. Protests also spread to Aleppo University, as security forces and students clashed on the campus of Aleppo's faculty of literature and three students were arrested. In Damascus, about 50 students staged a pro-freedom protest at the faculty of law.
- 14 April: President Assad met with a delegation close to the protesters in Daraa. The Daraa delegation afterwards said, Assad had promised them to lift the emergency law by 25 April.

In Baniyas, according to state media, snipers fatally shot a patrolling soldier.
State media announced a new government under Prime Minister Adel Safar. In the evening, state television announced that president Assad had "decided to release all those detained after recent events who did not commit crimes against the nation and the citizens".

Assad announced the release of hundreds of prisoners that were "not involved in criminal acts", and that a new government had been formed (see Cabinet of Syria). In the coastal city of Baniyas (Banias), the army replaced the secret police. Shortly afterwards, a sniper killed one soldier and wounded another. Assad also met with a delegation from Deraa in his first direct contact with representatives close to the protesters. 300 people protested in Suwayda.

- Friday 15 April, In the Damascus suburb Douma, thousands of protesters marched towards central Damascus when near Abasyeen Square they were attacked by security forces and intelligence services with pistols and sticks and tear gas, witnesses and activists said.

In the Barzeh district in Damascus, 250 protesters rallying in front of the Salam mosque were surrounded by dozens of armed men in plainclothes, after which violence reportedly erupted.
In Daraa, thousands demonstrated with government permission; security forces were not on the streets. Protests were also reported in Baniyas, Latakia, Baida, Homs, Deir ez-Zor and Qamishli. In these cities as in Daraa, some protesters just demanded political reforms, others called for complete regime change or the toppling of the government.
On "Friday of determination" (Arabic: جمعة الإصرار), tens of thousands of people held protests in several Syrian cities, including Baniyas, Latakia, Baida, Homs, and Deir ez-Zor. Al Jazeera reported that up to 50,000 protesters trying to enter Damascus from the Douma suburb were dispersed by security forces using tear gas, while in the Barzeh district of the capital violence erupted when dozens of armed men in plain clothes surrounded about 250 protesters rallying in front of a mosque. On the other hand, thousands demonstrated in Daraa, but security forces were not visible in the city, as the authorities reportedly allowed the uprising to take place.

== 16–24 April ==
- 16 April: After the new Syrian cabinet was sworn in, President Assad addressed the cabinet in a televised speech. After his address 30 March, this was the second time since the uprising began that Assad addressed the nation. Assad said that the emergency law——banning public gatherings of more than five people——would be lifted by next week, pledged dialogue with trade unions, but also said that "maintaining internal stability" in Syria is his top priority: "the Syrian people (…) love order and do not accept chaos and mob rule". Probably referring to the protests since 15 March, he said: "…last week, I found that there is a gap which started to appear between state institutions and the Syrian citizens (…) we need to fill this gap; but it should be filled with one thing which is (…) the trust of the citizens in the institutions of the state."

In Daraa, thousands marched, chanting: "The people want the overthrow of the regime", witnesses said.
In Douma, 1500 staged a sit-in to demand the release of 140 locals who were arrested in a march on 15 April, activists said.
In Latakia, a rally following a funeral was attacked by security forces firing in the air, a rights campaigner said.
In Baniyas, 1000 women marched in an all female pro-democracy protest: "Not Sunni, not Alawite. Freedom is what we all want", they reportedly chanted.

Thousands of people marched in Deraa chanting anti-government slogans, while in the Damascus suburb of Douma, 1,500 residents staged a sit-in, demanding the release of 140 people arrested a day earlier.

In Majdal Shams In the Israeli controlled area of the Golan heights, almost 200 people demonstrated in opposition to Assad and the government.

Assad spoke to the People's Assembly in a televised speech, stating that he expects his government to lift the emergency law the following, and acknowledging there is a gap between citizens and the state, and that government has to "keep up with the aspirations of the people". Later in the day he welcomed his new cabinet with a speech containing more specifics (full text). He spoke of the importance of reaching "a state of unity, unity between the government, state institutions and the people"; stressed the need for dialogue and consultation in multiple channels, popular support, trust and transparency; explained the interrelatedness of reform and the needs of citizens for services, security and dignity. He stated the first priorities were citizenship for Kurds, lifting the state of emergency in the coming week or at the latest the week after, regulating demonstrations without chaos and sabotage, political party law, local administration law in both structure and elections, and new and modern media law, all with public timeframes. The next topics were unemployment, the economy, rural services, attracting investment, the public and private sectors, justice, corruption, petty bribery, tax reform and reducing government waste, followed by tackling government itself with more participation, e-government, decentralization, effectiveness and efficiency, as well as closer cooperation with civil society, mass organizations and trade unions.

- 17 April: In Homs, after evening prayers, a group of 40 demonstrators gathered outside a mosque chanting "freedom", according to a witness; men in civilian clothes jumped out of cars and started firing at the crowd; according to activists, 25 people were killed.

About 300 protesters took to the streets in Suweida, but were dispersed by security forces. Reportedly, demonstrations also took place in Aleppo, Baniyas, Homs, and Hirak, mostly chanting slogans for political freedom. SANA reported seizure of a large number of weapons hidden in a lorry coming in from Iraq. Security forces opened fire on a funeral procession on a highway outside the town of Talbiseh, killing three people. In Homs, clashes between protesters and security forces took place after a tribal leader died in custody. 12 protesters were killed.

- 18 April: In Homs, early on the day, thousands attended the funerals of protesters killed in that town. Mourners reportedly chanted: "Either freedom or death, the people want to topple this regime". A 45-year-old protester told Al Jazeera: "For decades we’ve been ruled by an iron fist, by the force of weapon", "It’s the first time in my life I break the barrier of silence".

Also that Monday, Syria’s interior ministry stated that the country was facing an "armed insurrection under the motto of Jihad to set up a Salafist state".
Late that Monday night, according to a prominent activist, 10,000 people held a sit-in protest at the main central square in Homs. Security forces then opened fire and used tear gas to disperse this sit-in on this Clock Square. According to witnesses, security agents then took up positions to seal off the area and blocked the roads to the square with fire trucks, making it look like a war zone. Around midnight, leftist opposition figure Mahmoud Issa was arrested from his house in Homs.

External videos
- Protests in Homs, Syria, 18 April 2011 on YouTube

A high-ranked officer of the Syrian army; brigadier-general Abdo Kheder al-Tellawi was shot dead by an armed group in Homs along with his 2 children and nephew. According to the director of the National Hospital of Homs Dr. Ghassan Tannous, the bodies of the victims have been maimed and mutilated with the use of sharp tools.
More than 10,000 demonstrators staged an anti-government sit-in in Homs, and a massive funeral procession for six demonstrators who had been killed also took place in the city. In Baniyas, about 300 children released balloons with slogans calling on Assad to leave power.

Security forces shot dead at least 13 people when dispersing a protest. The Syrian Ministry of Interior announced that the latest developments in Syria such as the killing of policemen, army soldiers and civilians and terrifying people are all armed mutiny led by extremist Salafi armed groups.

- 19 April: In Homs, security forces opened fire on protesters to disperse a mass anti-government protest. On 18 and 19 April together, 21 protesters were shot dead in Homs by security police and Alawite gunmen known as ‘al-shabbiha’. Wissam Tarif, director of the Insan human rights group, told Reuters that civilian shabbiha and uniformed security forces, mixed, and all carrying weapons, were now obvious in the streets of Homs. During 17–19 April, protests were also in nearby towns Rastan and Talbiseh.

A colonel-pilot of the Syrian air forces; Mohammad Abdo Khaddour was shot dead by an armed group in front of his home in Homs. Police forces use combat rounds and tear gas to disperse a sit-in, deaths are confirmed, but their number is unknown. Police forces cause 3 deaths after opening fire on a funeral mourning dead protesters. The authorities vowed to "crush any new uprising". A witness reported that the gunfire lasted at least two hours.
The government passed a bill today, lifting the emergency law after 48 years. President Assad still had to sign the legislation.

- 20 April: Activists said that 4000 university students protested in Daraa. Around 20 students protested at the faculty of medicine of Aleppo University where they were quickly denied and absorbed by a pro-Assad rally.
- 21 April: President Assad endorsed the government law of 19 April, ending Syria's state of emergency. Reuters wrote, and leading activist Al-Maleh said, that this abolition hardly infringed on the powers of security forces to arbitrary arrests and detentions, or on other state tools of repression. Protesters call for Friday to be their biggest yet, in what they dub as "the Great Friday" (Arabic: الجمعة العظيمة).
- Friday, 22 April: For the first time, major demonstrations occurred in Damascus itself. Other cities where protesting was particularly strong were in Daraa, Baniyas, Qamishli, and Homs. The Douma and Harasta sections of Damascus were particularly filled with protesters. Firing throughout the country resulted 88 deaths among security forces and protesters, making it the bloodiest day so far.
  - Protests, slogans: On this day dubbed by activists "Great Friday" (Arabic: الجمعة العظيمة), anti-government protests were held in at least 20 towns across Syria. Cries for vengeance mixed with calls for the government's fall. Security forces quelled the protests with live ammunition and tear gas. A protester from a Damascus suburb said via phone to Al Jazeera media network that peaceful demonstrators, going with olive branches, were surprised by the security forces’ shooting. A protester in Douma said to The New York Times: "We are not scared anymore. We are sad and we are disappointed at this regime and at the president. Protests, demonstrations and death are now part of the daily routine". In two Damascus suburbs, protesters tore down Assad's picture and demolished statues of Assad's father. In central Damascus after Friday Prayer at the al-Hassan Mosque, hundreds of people gathered. Some of them chanted: "The people want the fall of the government"; security forces dispersed the protests with tear gas, witnesses said.
  - Casualties: News media and war researchers are not unanimous on the number of civilian casualties on this day. The New York Times estimated on 23 April and on 6 May that number as: "at least 109". The Institute for the Study of War in December 2011 agreed with that number and called 22 April the deadliest day in Syria between March and September 2011. But Al Jazeera English on 29 April 2011 estimated that on 22 April in Daraa alone already 100 people had been killed. First counts of deaths were in Homs 21, in Izra 15 (for Daraa an initial death-toll was not published). Deaths also were reported in the Damascus suburbs Muadamiyat, Douma, Zamalka, Barza and Qabon.
  - Government reaction: At Friday night, Syrian state television aired a talk show where speakers blamed foreign media, like Al Jazeera, Al Arabiya and BBC Arabic, for inciting the protests. A New York Times reporter assumed that the Syrian government emphatically tried to keep the largest cities, Damascus and Aleppo, relatively subdued.
- 23 April: In Douma and Barza today tens of thousands buried protesters killed the previous day, when security forces fired into these crowds of mourners. Again 11 people were killed, activists and witnesses said. 250 Syrian soldiers were also sent to Harasta, another suburb of Damascus, to confront a "violent gang", a deserted soldier said in June 2011 to Amnesty International, but they did not find a gang there but only 2,000 unarmed protesters, and saw the secret police and security forces open fire on them.

The events of the previous, very bloody, day incited Al Jazeera to entitle the Syrian 2011 protests no longer as merely ‘protests’ but henceforward as an "uprising".
Throughout the country, funerals for fallen protesters occurred. Snipers reportedly fired, killing 8 people in Daraa with 5 members of the security forces among them.

- 24 April: In the northern coastal city of Jableh a crackdown of security forces and Syrian army lasted into the night, killing twelve people. A resident said: "The army is deployed all over the area (…) It’s a street war". A Syrian human rights organisation said that nine civilians were killed in Jableh by security forces and pro-Assad gunmen.

== 25–30 April ==
=== Attack on Daraa ===
Between 25 April and 16 May 2011, the Syrian army attacked and occupied Daraa, since 18 March the most ardent centre of the Syrian protests. The army reportedly deployed 20 or 30 tanks, between hundreds and 6,000 troops, snipers on roofs, and helicopters with paratroopers for the final conquest of the focal Omari Mosque on Saturday 30 April. Presumably 244 civilians and 81 soldiers were killed; houses were reportedly searched to arrest protesters, houses were shelled; almost 1,000 men have reportedly been rounded up. "They want to teach Syria a lesson by teaching Daraa a lesson", a resident commented. There were rumours of soldiers, or an entire army division, having defected, and joined the protesters; these reports have not been independently verified. The government claimed it was battling "terrorist groups" in Daraa. After withdrawal of part of the troops from Daraa on 5 May, army units remained deployed at the city's entrances.

- 25 April: Tanks and soldiers entered Daraa and Douma. The border with Jordan was also closed. According to an activist, 18 people were killed in Daraa.
- 27 April: The army continued its crack down into 27 April, and over the span of three days arrested over 500 people. Several dozen died from the raids. The Syrian government intensified their raids using more tanks and brigades. 2 Jordanian civilians were amongst those killed. On 27 April 233 members of the Ba'ath Party, amongst them parliament members, resigned over the violence against protesters and civilians.
- 28 April: It has been confirmed that there are defections from within the Syrian army. Two battalions were sent into Deraa on 25 April, the fourth division and the fifth division. The fifth division refused to open fire on protesters, and there has been gun battles between the fourth and fifth divisions. The fourth division is controlled directly by Maher Assad, Bashar's brother.
- 29 April: Bashar's forces have cut off Daraa's water supply and electricity several days ago, as well as other cities in Syria. They have confiscated flour and food as well, in an effort to starve the people of Daraa. Activists called for another Friday of protests, dubbed "Solidarity with Daraa day".

Protests occurred nationwide including in Damascus in order to show solidarity with Daraa. At least 62 civilians were reported killed, many from Daraa.

- 30 April: The military increased their presence with more tanks and military helicopters. Snipers were positioned on buildings. Tanks began firing indiscriminately on houses, and also destroyed the local mosque. Snipers and military vehicles were also placed in other cities in the country such as Homs. Activists had called for this week, starting this Sunday, to be the "week of breaking the siege of Daraa" with the aim of stopping the siege on Daraa.

A video taken allegedly shows the dead bodies of protesters from Daraa wrapped in burial cloth and gathered and stored in a refrigerated room, as the people of Daraa are unable to burial them due to the military and sniper presence.

=== Blockading of Douma ===
Douma, a working-class suburb of capital Damascus that had also assumed a vital role in the Syrian protests (see reports 1, 3, 10, 15, 16, 22 and 23 April) was raided and blockaded by army and security forces for at least several days, end of April 2011.

- Monday 25 April: In Douma security forces arrested probably handsful of people.
- 26 April: According to a Human Rights Watch researcher, thousands of government troops raided homes in Douma to arrest suspected protesters.
- 27+28 April: Douma was completely sealed off by security forces, with its residents in need of supplies.

=== Remaining Syria ===
- 25 April: The events of 25 April, especially those in Daraa (see above), incited the prominent international news media to entitle the Syrian protests since mid-March with hindsight no longer as merely ‘protests, but as an "uprising". Since 18 March 400 civilians and dozens of soldiers and policemen had been reported killed.

Apart from their actions in Daraa and Douma (see above), security forces also searched houses in Izra, 27 km north-north-east of Daraa, and entered Damascus-suburb Muadhamiya arresting probably handsful of people. Border crossings into Jordan near the southern town of Daraa were reportedly sealed.

- 26 April: In the northern city of Jableh people were arrested, according to Rami Abdul-Rahman of the Syrian Observatory for Human Rights. The Syrian government said its actions are a response to an Islamist-inspired uprising.
- 27 April: According to a report of refugees fled into Lebanon, on 27 April a massacre may have taken place in Talkalakh, 20 miles due west of Homs and near the north-Lebanese border. Syrian military allegedly separated Sunni Muslims from Alawi Shia Muslims; arrested a popular Sheikh; Sunnis took to the streets protesting; military in tanks opened fire, killing 40 residents. Also residents would have been dragged away and tortured. No other news channel has yet confirmed anything of this story.
- 28 April: The leadership of the Syrian Muslim Brotherhood, in exile since in 1982 the Brotherhood was crushed by the government, has today for the first time since the demonstrations in Syria began in March, directly supported these protests: "Do not let the regime besiege your compatriots. Chant with one voice for freedom and dignity. Do not allow the tyrant to enslave you. God is great."

Since March, 1,000 Syrians have crossed the border into Lebanon, most of them not via the official border crossings.

- Friday 29 April: On this Friday dubbed "day of rage" in most major towns in Syria protests were held, like Homs, Baniyas, Latakia, Raqqa, Hama, Qamishli, Deir ez-Zor, and, for the first time, also in the heart of Damascus, in the Maidan district. 10,000 protesters in Baniyas reportedly shouted: "liberty, solidarity with Daraa" and "down with the regime", and 15,000 in Qamishli and surrounding towns were said to have yelled: "With our soul and with our blood we will sacrifice ourselves for Daraa". In Damascus-suburb Saqba protesters chanted: "We’re the youth revolution, not thugs or terrorists".

Apart from the 33 people killed in Daraa (see above), in Homs 25 people were reported killed, according to activists, and in Rastan 17. The authorities said that today nine members of security forces were killed by "terrorist groups".

In Deir Ez-Zor, 1,000 people emerged from a mosque and were dispersed by security forces, told AFP.
In the small village Jiza near Daraa, 13-year-old boy Hamza al-Khatib was taken by his father to an anti-government rally. The boy disappeared, taken in custody by Syrian officials according to Human Rights Watch. Almost a month later (see 25 or 28 May), according to activists, his tortured, badly injured, murdered body was returned to his parents; a video on YouTube purportedly showed gunshot wounds on Hamza’s body. Prominent Syrian activist Razan Zaitouneh considers this story plausible: she believes, the Syrian government wants the people to see this and understand that the most awful thing can happen to their family members in they continue to participate in this revolution. At that same demonstration, the 15-year-old boy Tamer Mohammed al Sharey from Jiza disappeared; a video released on 9 June by activists claimed his dead and tortured body also to be returned to his parents.

- 30 April: Hassan Ismail Abdel Azim, a prominent human rights activist, is arrested from his office by Syrian authorities.

138 members of the Syrian Ba'ath Party quit in protest against the deadly crackdown on pro-democracy demonstrators, according to AFP information. Since mid-March 550 people died in the Syrian clashes according to Arab and Syrian organisations for human rights.

The consecutive Timeline-article on these Syrian protests and uprising (by July 2012 considered to have escalated into civil war) is: Timeline of the Syrian Civil War (May–August 2011)
