= Timeline of the Syrian civil war (May–August 2011) =

The following is a timeline of the Syrian Civil War from May to August 2011, including the escalation of violence in many Syrian cities.

== May 2011 ==
=== 1–2 May ===
Protesters throughout Syria remained defiant despite intensifying arrests and attacks in Daraa and Douma.

The Syrian military continued shelling homes in Daraa with tanks. As the military siege on Daraa continued, Assad's security forces allegedly killed 40 civilians elsewhere in the town of Tel Kalakh. By 2 May, 4,000 people crossed the border into Lebanon.

=== 4 May ===
The deadly military siege on Daraa continued. Arrests intensified in Damascus, with large protests anticipated for Friday after prayers.

=== 5 May – Siege of Homs ===
Since 15 March 2011, according to the BBC, 500 Syrians have been killed and 2,500 others detained. Dozens of tanks were today sent to the Syrian city of Homs as part of the crackdown. Syrian army tanks raided Saqba and other suburbs of Damascus. In Damascus, the government arrested 300 people

The Syrian Army pulled out of Daraa By the end of the day, the army prepared to seize control of Baniyas.

About 100 tanks and troop transports converged on the town of Al-Rastan, after anti-government protesters toppled a statue of the late Syrian president Hafez al-Assad and pledged to press ahead with their revolution despite sweeping arrests by Bashar al-Assad's government.

=== 6 May – "Friday of Challenge" ===
On 6 May, after Friday noon prayers, demonstrators rose in cities and towns across Syria to protest the government, especially in the suburbs of Damascus, the smaller cities of Homs, Hama, and Baniyas, and in Syrian Kurdistan. Video and audio of security forces responding, in some cases with lethal force, appeared online within an hour of protests beginning. Eleven members of the Syrian army were allegedly killed by an armed group in Homs in an attack on a military checkpoint. At least three dead and 20 injured were reported in Homs alone, with a total of 16 dead between Homs and Hama, and opposition leaders Mouaz al-Khatib and Riad Seif were detained allegedly by secret police. Tens of thousands reportedly marched in Damascus and its suburbs, and about 7,000 protesters wearing funeral shrouds and carrying olive branches and flowers gathered in Baniyas, vowing to "meet the army peacefully", according to Al Jazeera, whose Arabic-language channel broadcast live from the city for some minutes. Several thousand Syrians participated in a protest march to the vicinity of Deraa, but security forces maintaining a siege of the city refused to let them enter with supplies for its inhabitants.

Following this "Day of Defiance", Amnesty International reported that activists Razan Zaitouneh, Wa’el Hammada, Haitham al-Maleh, Hind al-Labwani, Omar al-Labwani, Jwan Yousef Khorshid, Walid al-Bunni and Suheir al-Atassi had been forced to go into hiding.

Many anti-government protests occurred, starting mainly in the Kurdish Northeast and Damascus suburbs. Baniyas, Homs, and Hama were also among the cities which witnessed large demonstrations. 11 members of the Syrian army were killed by an armed group in Homs as a result of an armed attack on a military checkpoint. 16 civilians in Homs and Hama were shot dead by security forces.

=== 7 May – "Siege of Baniyas" ===
The Syrian army began a siege of Baniyas, with at least 6 civilians dead on 7 May, among them 4 women.

=== 8 May – "Siege of Tafas" ===
On 8 May, a 12-year-old boy was killed during a government crackdown in Homs and a 10-year-old boy was arrested, anti-government activists claimed. The Syrian army began a siege on Tafas, near Daraa, and arrested at least 250 people there.

=== 9 May ===
The Syrian army continued its house to house raid on Baniyas, Tafas, Homs. Arrests were ongoing in Damascus as well, where gunfire was heard.

The European Union institutes arms embargo and other sanctions against Syria, but not against President Assad.

=== 10 May ===
The Syrian army prepared a siege on Hama, as the siege on Baniyas, Tafas, Homs, and Damascus continued. The European Union imposed sanctions on 13 government individuals including Maher al-Assad, Bashar's brother, who commands the security brigades. Kuwait will also replace Syria for bid on membership of the UN Human Rights Council due to Syria's oppression of protesters.

=== 11 May ===
In an escalation of the siege on Homs, tanks were sent in and began shelling buildings, with at least 5 killed. Secretary general of the UN Ban Ki-moon demanded that the UN have access to Daraa.

=== 12 May ===
Mass arrests were carried out in Aleppo against students who protested. The siege of Homs, Tafas, and Baniyas continued. Tanks were sent towards Hama. Dael, Jassem, and Al-Harah were also under siege by tanks and troops.

=== 13 May – "Friday of Free Women" ===
Bashar Al-Assad reportedly ordered the Syrian army "not to shoot" at protesters ahead of expected Friday protests. Security forces began to set up checkpoints and roadblocks all across Syria. Demonstrations first began in Hama and Qamishli and Homs. Towns across the Kurdish northeast protested as Kurds have been intensifying their protests. Thousands rallied in Daraa where security forces fired warning shots. Thousands rallied in Damascus, where police presence was especially large, particularly in the Midan suburb, where thousands of officers were deployed to stop them from entering other parts of Damascus. People tried to protest in Baniyas and Latakia, but were shot at with live ammunition.

Three people were shot and killed by security forces in Homs, two in Damascus, and one in Daraa. Despite the intensified crackdown and massive police and army presence, the strength and the number of protesters in Damascus appeared to have only increased.

=== 14 May – "Siege of Talkalakh" ===
The government continued to prevent food from being sent to Daraa, in an effort to starve people into stopping their protests. The army launched a siege on Talkalakh, killing four civilians and sending hundreds to seek refugee in Lebanon. Protesting occurred in several cities, including Daraa. Funerals for slain protesters were held in Damascus's suburbs. The Kurds protesting in the north have called on all opposition forces in and out of Syria to unite into one party aiming at transferring Syria from a dictatorship to a democracy.

=== 15 May - "Israeli border demonstrations" ===
23 Syrian protesters are killed and 350 wounded by live fire from Israeli forces.

=== 16 May ===
The Syrian army's siege across the country continued, especially in Talkalakh, where 7 civilians were killed by Syrian army snipers when trying to cross the border into Lebanon. By this point 5,000 people had crossed the border into Lebanon. International media reported that mass graves had been found by farmers on the outskirts of Daraa with at least 20 dead people in them, leading security forces to immediately reinstate a curfew in the restive town.

=== 17 May ===
The chief of the Political Security Forces of Homs and four other officers were killed by an armed group in Talkalakh. The civilian death toll from the Syrian army's siege on Talkalakh risen to 27. Thousands attended funerals for slain protesters in Damascus the previous day. University students attempted to protest in Aleppo, but were dispersed by an immense security presence. Activists called for a general strike in Syria starting Wednesday. Sunni refugees told reporters that sectarian violence had broken out in Talkalakh, with Alawite paramilitaries clashing with Sunni residents.

=== 19 May ===
The general strike did not affect Damascus significantly, which is mostly blamed on the fear factor. Other towns saw greater levels of general strike. The USA put up sanctions on six top Syrian government officials, including Bashar al-Assad. As the opposition promised to continue their campaign, shootings and arrests of protesters were ongoing in Syria, as well as the siege and starvation of Talkalakh.

=== 20 May – "Friday of Azady (freedom)" ===
Over 23 people, including 2 boys, were killed by security forces across Syria. Most of the deaths occurred in Homs. For the first time Assyrian Christians joined protests, in which many were arrested. Protesters burned down the Ba'ath Party headquarters in Abu Kamal. Four protesters were killed in the Berze section of Damascus, where security forces surrounded it and shut off its electricity. 9 of the 23 dead protesters were killed in Hama, and another 9 in Kafr Nabl. Qamishli saw large protests by the Kurds. Other cities that saw thousands protest were Hama, Homs, Sanamin, Hassake, Amouda, Ras al-Ain, Tel, Baniyas, and Latakia.

=== 21 May ===
The death toll from Friday through Saturday rose to 76. Security forces in Homs fired on a funeral procession, killing 22 mourners. A video released allegedly shows soldiers gathering dead bodies of Syrian protesters and mocking them.

=== 24 May ===
Human rights groups say the civilian death toll has reached over 1,100. They also confirmed that soldiers who refused to fire on civilians were executed by the Syrian army. A large number of opposition groups are reportedly planning to meet in Turkey at the end of the month; to attempt to elect a transitional council, connect with protesters inside the country, and present the international community with a clear alternative to Assad.

=== 25 May ===
Hamza al-Khateeb's tortured lifeless body was delivered to his family with three gunshot wounds, his genitals cut off & bruises all over. Hamza was a 13 years old Syrian boy, he lived with his parents in a village called Al-Jiza in Daraa Governorate. He joined his family in a rally to break the siege of the city of Daraa. He was detained among hundreds of Syrians during the massacre of Siada, where citizens of Daraa were randomly killed by Syrian security forces. Hamza was detained amongst hundreds. According to his autopsy he was shot down after cutting his genitals. The chief of Syria's medical examiners association Dr. Akram El-Shaar denied that Hamza was tortured, claimed that he supervised the autopsy in Damascus and that the boy did not have any sign of torture. He also claimed that all signs of disfigurement were due to decay.

=== 26 May ===
On 26 May, Haaretz reported that protests had broken out in the eastern city of Abu Kamal, with protesters burning pictures of both Assad and Hezbollah leader Hassan Nasrallah, who had given a speech in support of Assad earlier in the week. Security forces had reportedly withdrawn from the city, situated on the Iraqi border. Additionally, five protesters were injured in the town of Zabadani on the border with Lebanon after security forces fired on protesters. Thirty thousand protesters were rumoured to be in the town of Rastan, chanting anti-Assad slogans. Protesters planned to launch more large demonstrations Friday to protest Syrian forces' reprisals against, rather than defense of, Syrian civilians.

Protesters plan to launch more large demonstrations Friday. This Friday dubbed, "Honor to the Guardians", will focus on asking the Syrian army to defend its people rather than its government.

=== 27 May – "Home Protectors' Friday" ===
External videos
- Thousands of protesters, Hama, Syria, 27 May 2011 on YouTube

Protests occurred throughout the country on this "Home Protectors' Friday" (Arabic: جمعة حماة الديار). A total of 7 protesters died. Cities where several thousand protested in each included Baniyas, Berze, Qatana, Deir al-Zur, Zabadani, Dael, Daraa, Ablu Kamal, and Homs. Tens of thousands protested in Hama.

=== 28 May – "Siege of Rastan and Talbiseh" ===
On 28 May, the military pushed into the towns of Rastan and Talbiseh. The opposition claimed that soldiers fired from machine guns and tanks as they spread out through Talbiseh and started breaking into homes and arresting people. The operation started after the authorities cut all telecommunications in the area and all roads leading to the two towns were closed off by security forces and soldiers.

On the same day, footage purportedly of a protest in Deraa appeared on YouTube that showed people carrying the photo of a 13-year-old boy, Hamza al-Khateeb, whom opposition activists alleged was tortured and killed. Human Rights Watch – who called on the government to investigate the case – stated that a Syrian researcher with their organisation had spoken to a relative who asserted that the boy had been taken into custody on 29 April during an anti-government march. A month later, his body was returned to the family for burial, allegedly riddled with bullets; his kneecaps, jaw, and neck broken; and his genitals mutilated. Various media sources pointed to a Facebook page in honor of the boy, as well as Twitter and blog posts from activists, in suggesting that the story emerging about the boy had reinvigorated calls for protest and "could galvanize the country's troubled protest movement", drawing comparisons with Khaled Saeed in the Egyptian Revolution. Significant protests followed in Hama, Darayya, and, for the first time, Aleppo, with thousands chanting Hamza's name. A doctor invited to appear on pro-government television station al-Dunya claimed that the injuries were not consistent with torture and could have been faked. While the Syrian government denies access to foreign media to confirm or deny any story or event, the story of the boy's death travelled fast and far and was reportedly inspiring some who had not previously participated to engage in the demonstrations.

=== 30 May ===
Fourteen civilians were allegedly killed in Syria by security forces on 30 May, including a young girl. Cities and towns in the Daraa and Homs region saw the most intense protests. In response the Syrian army launched attacks and sieges on many towns and villages in the Homs and Daraa region, especially near Homs.

=== 31 May ===
On 31 May, media reported that armed residents in Rastan and Talbiseh put up resistance to the military and the besieging army was not able to enter the two towns. The military reportedly started artillery attacks on both cities.

== June 2011 ==
=== 2 June ===
Witnesses said Syrian forces destroyed a number of buildings in protest stronghold Rastan on 2 June. Human rights groups put the civilian death toll from the crackdown in the Rastan region at 41 or more, including 2 young girls. Human Rights Watch issued a statement asserting, "The Syrian regime has carried out a "systematic" series of abuses against protesters that could "qualify as crimes against humanity," and the United Nations must hold the government accountable". Human Rights Watch makes these assertions in a report titled "'We've Never Seen Such Horror': Crimes against Humanity in Daraa".

=== 3 June – "Friday of Children" ===
On this Friday, dubbed "Friday of Children", the largest protest outside Daraa so far occurred in Hama, with about 50,000 protesters. Protests occurred throughout the country, including in Damascus's suburbs and Daraa. The Syrian government shut off most of Syria's internet, reducing about 2/3 of Syria's internet activities.

64 people were killed in Hama alone by security forces. United States Secretary of State Hillary Clinton made a statement saying Assad is about to lose legitimacy.

=== 4 June ===
Mass funerals were held in Hama and other cities. The death toll from Friday's protests risen to 72. Tanks were sent to Hama in preparation for another siege on the city.

The Syrian government reportedly began using helicopter gunships on protesters, killing at least 10 in Rastan.

=== 5 June ===
13 Syrian protesters are killed by Israeli security forces in disputed-Golan Heights.

=== 6 June ===
Syrian state TV reported that 120 soldiers were killed in Jisr al-Shughour by what the news agency called "armed gangs" launching an ambush.

=== 10 June – "Friday of Tribes" and "Siege of Jisr ash-Shugur" ===
On 10 June, the Syrian Army began military operations against the towns of Maarat al-Numan and Jisr ash-Shugur near the international border with Turkey. These operations reportedly included the deployment of troops, tanks, artillery, and even attack helicopters. Refugees streamed out of the towns in Idlib Governorate, with well over 2,000 fleeing into Turkey, Ankara and the United Nations claimed. Anti-government activists in Idlib claimed 23 Syrians were killed, many of them by shelling and helicopter assault against Maarat al-Numan, which was apparently a reprisal attack for the claimed deaths of officers days earlier. Amidst the violence in the northwest, demonstrators rallied in Aleppo, Latakia, and Damascus. Fifty student activists were reportedly detained in Aleppo, nine protesters were shot in Latakia, and at least four protesters were killed in Damascus, as well as two more protesters elsewhere in the country, according to activists. The government claimed a police officer was killed in Damascus as well, but demonstrators said their protests were peaceful and no member of Assad's security forces was harmed. Britain and France prepared a UN resolution condemning the crackdown on protesters in Syria. Turkish Prime Minister Recep Tayyip Erdoğan condemned the Syrian crackdown on protesters and said that the Syrian army had committed atrocities.

A second child named Tamer al-Sharey, age 15, was claimed to have been tortured and killed by Syrian police. Tamer al-Sharey was allegedly abducted by police, tortured, and killed, in a death similar to that of Hamza al-Khateeb, aged 13. Video footage allegedly shows the body of the dead 15-year-old.

=== 13 June ===
By 13 June, helicopter gunships and tanks breached the nearly empty town of Jisr ash-Shugur. Many residents left the city, with many fleeing to Turkey. The Syrian army reportedly engaged in battle with some army defectors, some witnesses who spoke to international press asserted, and conducted house-by-house arrests. Civilians were shot on sight, including a 16-year-old boy, according to some witnesses. Other witnesses reported that many of the troops who came into Jisr ash-Shugur were Iranian, though the Iranian government has repeatedly denied it is offering any military assistance to Syria to put down the uprising. Soldiers who refused to shoot at people, even if they just shot in the air, were allegedly executed.

=== 14 June ===
The security branch of Jisr ash-Shugur largely defected, and the Syrian government decided to expand the siege and surround the northern town of Maraat al-Numaan.

The Syrian army sent troops into Ariha, and shot dead six civilians. Another six civilians also died in Deir Ezzor, when security forces shot the protesters there. The Syrian army was sent to Abu Kamal as well.

A journalist who snuck into Daraa reported that the Syrian army has blocked off most of town, and will not allow any supplies to come through. Consequently, Daraa is about to face a famine. 5000 residents there are being held in the local stadium, now used as a detention facility.

For the first time, the Arab League condemned Syria's crackdown and repression.

=== 16 June ===
As the protesting and the Syrian's army's siege on Deir-el Zour, Jisr ash-Shugur, and Daraa continued, the Syrian army prepared to launch a siege at the Iraqi border town of al-Boukamal, the town of Khan Shaykoun, and the city of Maraat al-Numaan. Much of Maraat al-Numaan's civilian population fled the city.

Rami Maklouf, Syrian's richest businessman and owner of Syriatel, Syria's largest phone company, publicly resigned "to do charity work" and quit business life. Maklouf was a close confidant of president Assad.

UN Chief Ban Ki Moon condemned the violent crackdown.

The Syrian opposition planned more protests for Friday, in what they dubbed as Friday of Saleh al-Ali. Saleh al-Ali was a renowned Syrian Alawite who commanded the Syrian rebellion against the French Mandate in the early 20th century. The opposition said it hoped to achieve Alawite support for the protests.

=== 17 June – "Friday of Saleh al-Ali" ===
Demonstrators claimed this Friday of protesting to be the largest one yet. Activists say 19 were killed nationwide by, security forces, including the first death in Aleppo. Tens of thousands protested in Daraa, as well as in Deir al-Zor, Homs, Kiswa, and Hama, as well as other cities. Tripoli, Lebanon, saw anti-Syrian government demonstrations, where two people died in a clash between Sunni's and Alawites. A total of 2000 people have been arrest in Jisr al-Shugur, and a reported 130 civilians killed there.

Rami Abdel Rahman, head of the London-based Syrian Observatory of Human Rights, said five people were killed in Homs after security forces fired at a crowd of around 5,000 people. The state news agency SANA said a member of the security forces was killed and more than 30 were wounded by gunfire in Homs.

Abdel Rahman also reported of casualties in Banias after "intense firing to disperse the demonstrations," and of hundreds of protesters in Suweida dispersed by Syrian forces wielding clubs. He also said there were anti-government demonstrations in Daraa province and Jableh, and two deaths in Harasta and two in Deir Ezzor. SANA reported of rallies in several cities and towns including Hama and Deir Ezzor, and said that six members of the security forces were wounded when gunmen attacked a recruitment centre in Deir Ezzor.

Other activists who reached Agence France Presse in Nicosia by telephone reported that two people were killed in Dael in the Daraa province and one in Douma. Witnesses also told AFP that a gunman killed a policeman and wounded at least four after he fired on a police station in Rikn al-Deen. In a separate incident, SANA reported of three policemen wounded by gunfire in the Qaboun neighbourhood of Damascus.

Activists also said there were protests in Latakia and Maaret al-Nooman, and that 4,000 demonstrated in Qamishli and about 3,000 in Amuda. Abdullah al-Khalil, a rights activist, said that 2,500 people demonstrated in Raqqa without intervention by security forces.

=== 18 June ===
The Syrian Army stormed Bdama, just two kilometers from the Turkish border, and seized control of the town, making several dozen arrests. Refugees claimed troops were shooting indiscriminately at residents of the town who stayed behind and appeared on the streets. In response to the use of lethal force in security clampdowns both in Idlib Governorate and elsewhere in Syria, demonstrators reportedly protested overnight in Albu Kamal, Deir al-Zor, Madaya, Homs, Hama, Latakia, and several districts of Damascus in defiance of the ban.

=== 19 June ===
Opposition activists established a "National Council" to "lead the Syrian revolution, comprising all communities and representatives of national political forces inside and outside Syria," said their spokesmen, Jamil Saib, in a statement near the Turkish border.

Syrian security forces were reportedly blocking refugees from escaping to Turkey, and were also firing at those trying to bring supplies and relief to them. Several thousand were now being prevented from leaving Syria, activists said.

=== 20 June ===
In an hour-long noon address, President Assad blamed "vandals", "radical and blasphemous individuals", and "foreign conspiracies" for the unrest, but also admitted that some of the demands of protesters were legitimate. He said the government was committed to moving forward with "reforms" and said he planned to meet with "committees" to address the question of how to draft a new constitution and grant other concessions. However, he did not outline a timeline or name any specific opposition groups or leaders whose input he was seeking in the process. Assad also offered an amnesty to peaceful protesters but warned that the military would continue to hunt down "terrorists", a term he has used before to describe anti-government individuals he accuses of acting violently. In the speech, Assad said over 64,000 people were wanted by the government on charges of "sedition" and "terrorism". Assad also said a new parliamentary election could be held as soon as August, and unspecified reforms would be delivered by the end of September.

Al Jazeera reported that refugees in Turkey from the military crackdown in northern Syria broke out into anti-Assad demonstrations and vented frustration with the president after watching and listening to the widely broadcast speech.

After the speech, protesters gathered in Damascus's suburbs, Latakia, Baniyas, Aleppo, Daraa, Homs, Hama, and several other cities to demonstrate against the government. Activists dismissed Assad's claims of reform, saying "no dialogue with the murderers".

The Turkish government sent an envoy to Damascus, who gave the Syrian government the message that they must remove Maher Assad, which the envoy called Syria's "thug in chief".

=== 21 June ===
The Syrian government encouraged all members of the Baath party to host pro-Assad rallies, sparking such rallies in several cities in Syria, most notably in Damascus where tens of thousands occupied the local square. The Syrian opposition held some counter-rallies, which came under attack by security forces, resulting in 7 anti-government protester deaths in Hama and Homs.

=== 22 June ===
Fearing growing anti-government demonstrations in Aleppo, police raided the Aleppo University campus and arrested dozens. Security forces attempted to limit the flow of supplies and people to and from Aleppo by setting up roadblocks on the local highways. The opposition of Syria rejected Assad's amnesty claims. Rioting occurred in a Northern Syrian prison when the government began releasing common day criminals instead of political prisoners, according to residents.

=== 24 June – "Friday of Lost Legitimacy" ===
In one of the largest yet, mass Friday demonstrations occurred in Syria. For the first time, people in central Damascus began protesting, where they were immediately shot outside the local mosque, killing 6. An additional 9 protesters were killed elsewhere in Syria, bringing the total to 15. However, some activists say the number could be as high as 20. The largest demonstration yet occurred in Hama, where an estimated 200,000 people participated. Approximately 15,000 people protested on the highway linking Damascus to Aleppo. The Damascus suburb of Zabadani had major protests for the first time as well. Other cities in which demonstrations occurred included Homs, Daraa, Latakia, Qamishli Amouda, Al-Kisweh, Al-Quasyr, and others. The Syrian government set up camps and road blocks on the roads nearby Aleppo, fearing any possible exodus from there. The European Union expanded sanctions on Syria.

=== 25 June ===
The death toll of Friday's protests had risen to 18. The Syrian army entered villages in Syria's far north, where villagers fled into Turkey in anticipation of their arrival. By putting troops at the border, it was seen internationally as a veiled threat against Turkey.

=== 29 June ===
As protests continued, the Syrian army continued to enter and attack villages in the Idlib province, killing four people in the village of Rameh. The Syrian army also moved in on Marayn, Ihsim, Barshoun, and al-Bara.

=== 30 June – "Aleppo volcano" ===
There were demonstrations across Aleppo, Syria's second city, including in neighborhoods such as Al Masharqah, Seif El Dawla, Alsakhur, Jamiliah, Bab El-Nasr, Bab El-Hadeed, University Square and others, and demonstrator was killed. Activists called for another Friday of mass protests, this time dubbed Friday of Departure.

== July 2011 ==
=== 1 July – "Friday of Departure" ===
Major protests were seen across the country, in the largest demonstrations to date. Over half a million people were said to have joined the demonstration in Hama, making it the largest single rally so far. Tens of thousands elsewhere protested as well, such as in Homs. An estimated 10,000 people took to the streets in Aleppo before the protest was crushed by security forces. It was the biggest protest seen in Aleppo up to that point. 6,000 people took to the streets in Hajar al-Aswad in Damascus. There was also a pro-Assad rally outside of the Syrian embassy in Amman, Jordan. 28 people have been killed in the protests, most of them in Idlib.

=== 2 July ===
Protesters sing "Yalla Erhal Ya Bashar" ("Come on, Bashar, leave") in Hama's Assi Square, 2 July 2011. The song's purported author, Ibrahim Qashoush, was found dead the next day.

A funeral was held in Homs for five protesters killed the day before by security forces in Homs, Damascus and its countryside, with 7,000 mourners attending. The Assad anti-government demonstrations continued in Hama, Deir ez-Zor, Duma, Idlib (despite the siege), Talbiseh, Latakia and Adhamiya in Aleppo. There were also demonstrations by the Syrian communities in Strasbourg and Lyon in France.

The Syrian government has sent military reinforcements to the international road Damascus – Aleppo, heading north. Columns of tanks were seen on the road to Hama – Aleppo, near Khan Shaykhun in Idlib.

=== 3 July ===
Government tanks and troops began deploying around Hama, with reports of gunfire and mass arrests taking place in the city. Anti-Assad demonstrations continued in Damascus and its countryside, with two protesters killed by police in the suburb of Hajar al-Aswad.

=== 5 July ===
Dozens of people were arrested in Damascus, and the Syrian army killed 11 people in Hama.

=== 6 July ===
Amnesty International calls for the United Nations to investigate Syria, claiming that the violent crackdown on protestors may constitute crimes against humanity. This comes after the organisation releases a report documenting a military sweep in the western village of Tell Kalakh in May. The Syrian government claims that many of the dead were killed by criminal gangs.

=== 7 July ===
Another Friday of protests are planned, this time dubbed Friday of No Dialogue, an attempt by the opposition to emphasize that they do not believe the Syrian government is capable of reform, and that dialogue is in vain due to the high number of protester deaths. The death toll from the Hama crackdown has risen to 22.

=== 8 July – "Friday of No Dialogue" ===
In the presence of the French and United States ambassadors to Syria, a demonstration was held in Al-Assy Square in Hama, with an estimated 500,000 protesters. According to activists, it was the single largest rally of the uprising thus far. There were also demonstrations in Damascus and its countryside, Homs, Idlib, Deir Al-Zour, Latakia, Qamishli and Deraa. For the first time the unrest spread to the centre of the capital city of Damascus where security services were filmed firing at protesters at close range, according to unverified footage. The opposition reported 13 people killed during Friday's protests, and over 40 people are reported to have been wounded.

=== 10 July ===
The Syrian army launched a raid in Homs, killing at least one person. The American and French diplomats who participated in Friday's protests were summoned to the Syrian Foreign Ministry. In Demas outside of Damascus, Syrian officials formally opened what they described as a national dialogue aimed at a transition to a multiparty democracy. Opposition leaders boycotted the event, saying it is a sham to mask the government's crackdown on protesters, and that they will not participate without an end to the crackdown.

=== 11 July ===
Supporters of President al-Assad attacked the embassies of France and the United States in Damascus. According to a US embassy official, there had been physical damage done, but no one was injured. The official also said that the authorities had been slow to respond despite assurances from the Syrian government that the embassy would be given adequate protection. At the French embassy, guards fired into the air to disperse a crowd.

Robert Stephen Ford, the US ambassador to Syria criticized the government on the embassy's Facebook page, stating "On 9 July, a 'mnhebak' group threw rocks at our embassy, causing some damage. They resorted to violence, unlike the people in Hama, who have stayed peaceful... and how ironic that the Syrian Government lets an anti-US demonstration proceed freely while their security thugs beat down olive branch-carrying peaceful protesters elsewhere."

US Secretary of State Hillary Clinton condemned both the attacks and the incumbent government, stating that al-Assad had "lost legitimacy," and that "President Assad is not indispensable and we have absolutely nothing invested in him remaining in power."

=== 13 July ===
Four villagers were killed by the Syrian army in the village of Jabal al Zawiya.

=== 14 July ===
Security forces killed 8 protesters in Deir al-Zour, amid a wide-scale strike in that town. 2 protesters were also killed in Homs. and 1 in Aleppo.

Activists have called for another Friday of protests, this time dubbed "Friday of Freedom for Hostages", in reference to their demands for the Syrian government to release over 12,000 protesters who were arrested and detained without trial so far.

=== 15 July – "Friday of Freedom for the Hostages" ===
Mass protests occurred. At least 28 civilians were reported killed by Syrian security forces. The protests were widespread, most notably occurring in Damascus and its countryside, Homs, Qamishli, Daraa, Latakia, Idlib, and Al-Raqqah. 700,000 came out in Martyrs square in Hama, 350,000 in the eastern province of Deir ez-Zor and 20,000 in Aleppo. Syrian communities abroad demonstrated in front of the embassies of their countries.

=== 16 July ===
In the town of Abu Kamal, on the border with Iraq, five protesters were killed by the Syrian army. A day later, thousands of people took to the streets before the military tried to intervene to suppress the demonstrations. However, they were unsuccessful in doing so as the protesters were larger in size. It was reported that 100 Air Force intelligence agents and the crew of at least four armored vehicles defected to the opposition. Activists also claimed that the protesters managed to capture several tanks, armored vehicles and weapons from the army. The government stated that three soldiers were killed in the clashes. After an agreement was reached between the protesters and the military, some of the seized military vehicles and weapons were handed back.

=== 17 July ===
During factional fighting between residents of Homs 30 people were killed. At the same time, the army entered some villages in Aleppo's countryside, according to activists on the Internet.

Some soldiers defected with their armoured personnel carriers and joined the protesters, as did at least 100 Air Force personnel in a town near the Iraqi border.

=== 18 July ===
Continue to the funeral of the martyrs of Qaboun and demonstration in the evening in Harasta and military operations in Homs.

=== 21 July ===
The Syrian army was sent to Homs where they fired machine guns randomly at anyone in the streets. At least 40 civilians were reported killed. The Syrian army also conducted arrests and raids.

Activists have called for another Friday of protests, this time dubbed Friday of Khaled bin al-Walid, after a Muslim military commander from the Middle Ages who is buried in Homs.

=== 22 July – "Friday of Khalid ibn al-Walid grandsons" ===
Hundreds of thousands of protesters parade the flag of Syria and shout "Ash-shab yurid isqat an-nizam" in the Assi square of Hama on 22 July 2011

Mass protests occurred, with at least 450,000 protesters in Deir Ezzour, and 650,000 in Hama. Tens of thousands protested in other cities as well, the Kurdish Northeast, Daraa, the Syrian coast, Aleppo and Homs. The Syrian army was sent into the central area of Damascus where they conducted arrests and prevented anyone from rallying. A total of 8 people were killed by the Syrian army most of them in Aleppo on Friday.

=== 23 July ===
Many demonstrations took place in front of Syrian embassies abroad to denounce the suppression of peaceful protesters by the authorities.

=== 26 July ===
As protests continued, the Syrian army raided the Damascus suburb of Kanakir with tanks, killing 8 civilians. The security forces arrested at least 250 people, all in an attempt to subdue opposition in Damascus before Ramadan occurs, when the protests are expected to intensify further.

=== 28 July ===
Security forces swept through Damascus's neighborhoods again, killing four people and conducting mass arrests. Activists called for mass Friday protests under the name of "Your Silence is Killing Us" in an attempt to encourage the silent majority of Syria's population to take sides with the anti-Assad demonstrators.

=== 29 July – "Friday of 'Your Silence Is Killing Us'" ===
Massive protests ensued as security forces unleashed expansive crackdowns. 20 protesters were killed throughout Syria, most notably in Deir ez-Zor, where the government tried to stop mass gatherings. The Syrian army was sent into the city with tanks and fired on protesters with live ammunition, while Daraa and Latakia also witnessed protester deaths. Other places where protesting occurred included Hama, Homs, Qamishli, and Aleppo. The Syrian army conducted mass arrests in the capital, Damascus. The Syrian army's brutal response was one of heaviest since June. A colonel in the Syrian Army claimed he had defected to the opposition along with "hundreds" of other military personnel in the city of Deir ez-Zor, and called his group the Free Syrian Army. The largest protest of the uprising occurred on this day in Hama's Asi Square, with nearly 1 million participating.

=== 31 July ===
On what appeared to be the bloodiest day of the uprising to date, at least 136 were killed across the country as Syrian tanks, snipers, and troops stormed Deir ez-Zor, Hama, Harak, and Abu Kamal. The crackdown was an apparent effort to halt the momentum of the protest movement before the Muslim holy month of Ramadan. The Syrian government claimed its military actions were in response to armed gangs attacking buildings and forcing people to protest, allegations rejected by protesters and American diplomats inside the country.

== August 2011 ==
=== 3 August ===
Following increased violence in the preceding days, the United Nations Security Council for the first time condemned the human rights violations against the Syrian protesters. 45 people were killed in Hama on 3 August.

=== 4 August ===
Assad issued a decree authorizing the formation of multiple political parties in Syria, as well as election reforms aimed at pleasing protesters. Even as he did this, the Hama crackdown intensified, leaving now over 200 dead in Hama since 31 July. Hama is now enduring a widespread power outage as well as a blockade of basic food and medical supplies. The Syrian opposition intends for another Friday of mass protests dubbed "The Friday of God is with Us".

=== 5 August – "Friday of 'God is With Us'" ===
Mass protests occurred for Friday protests, including 30,000 in Deir Ezzour. Hama was totally suppressed, making it difficult for people to rally there. Citizens in Qamishli, Aleppo, Deraa, Homs, suburban and central Damascus went out to protest in solidarity with Hama. 24 civilians were killed by security forces, including 5 in Damascus.

=== 6 August ===
The Syrian army entered Homs and Deir Ezzour with tanks in an attempt to stop people from rallying. Turkey said it would send its foreign minister to Damascus to present the Turkish government's demands for an end to the crackdown, while the Gulf Co-operation Council condemned the violence in a joint statement by GCC member states. United Nations Secretary-General Ban Ki-moon also condemned the violence.

=== 7 August ===
Over 70 people were killed in Syria, according to local human rights groups. Over 50 were killed in Deir Ezzour alone. Dozens were arrested, and use of mortars and tanks to shell neighborhoods was also reported. The Arab League condemned the actions of the Syrian government for the first time.

=== 8 August ===
Just after midnight, King Abdullah of Saudi Arabia gave a televised address condemning the Syrian government over the crackdown. The king also said Saudi Arabia was recalling its ambassador to Syria. He warned Assad to enact major reforms or else Syria "will be pulled down into the depths of turmoil and loss". Kuwait and later Bahrain also recalled their ambassadors and said a GCC summit would be held soon to determine a unified course of action for responding to the events in Syria. A mother and her two children were killed in Deir ez-Zor by Syrian troops storming the city during the predawn adhān, according to the Syrian Observatory for Human Rights. The attack on Deir ez-Zor reportedly continued until noon. Soldiers also entered Maarat an-Numan in northern Syria from the east and quickly cordoned off the city, preventing anyone from entering or exiting, a local opposition committee said in a statement. Seven people attending a funeral in Daraa were also reported killed when security forces attacked the procession, leaving dozens more injured. The deadly incident prompted late-night protests in the city, with demonstrators saying they held police responsible for the violence. The head of the Arab Organization for Human Rights claimed 24 people were killed throughout the country during the day, while UN Assistant Secretary-General for Political Affairs Oscar Fernandez-Taranco said 87 civilians were killed by Syrian forces. The online group Anonymous defaced the Syrian Ministry of Defense website with a message urging members of the Syrian Army to defect and expressing solidarity with the protesters. President Assad sacked Defense Minister Ali Habib Mahmud and replaced him with General Dawoud Rajiha, the Syrian Army's chief of staff, due to Ali Habib Mahmud's declining health.

=== 9 August ===
An opposition group reported Syrian forces were attacking Sarmin, a town in Idlib Governorate, at dawn from three sides, conducting raids and arresting residents. Tanks were said to be deployed in and around Idlib, the provincial capital. The siege of Deir ez-Zor continued, with tank shelling reported in the al-Hawiqa district, and at least 15 deaths were reported in the city, along with two more elsewhere in Idlib Governorate. There were also sketchy reports of military operations near Al-Bu-Kamal, close to the Iraqi border. Five were reported killed in Hama, including two children from the same family. Syrian troops also assaulted Binnish in an apparent reprisal for large-scale "night rallies after Ramadan prayers", according to a local resident, leaving four villagers reported dead.

Opposition websites claimed that former Syrian defense minister Ali Habib Mahmud was found dead in his home. A spokesman for the Syrian government initially claimed he had died of "a disease", while the opposition accused the Syrian government of executing him. According to the opposition, Ali Habib started refusing to send in the army into cities because he feared increasing defections, and for that he was killed. However, he appeared on Syrian state TV hours after his supposed death to deny that he was fired or killed, saying he resigned due to illness.

Turkish Foreign Minister Ahmet Davutoğlu met with President Bashar al-Assad for over two hours and spoke with other Syrian officials for four more hours in total before departing Syria without making a statement. Assad reportedly told Davutoğlu during the meeting that his government "will not relent in pursuing the terrorist groups in order to protect the stability of the country and the security of the citizens" but said he was still committed to making reforms. Upon returning to Turkey, Davutoğlu said his government will continue relations with Damascus, but said he had urged Assad to take "concrete steps" to end the violence without answering whether Assad had agreed to do so. Meanwhile, Egypt sharply criticized the Syrian government for promising reforms while continuing violence, with Foreign Minister Mohamed Kamel Amr calling such reforms "of no use". Amr demanded an end to the crackdown and said Assad and the Syrian populace should engage in a comprehensive national dialogue.

In a retaliatory cyberattack for the hacking of the Ministry of Defence website, a website set up by Anonymous was hacked by supporters of the Syrian government, who placed photos of burned bodies and a message claiming the victims were Syrian soldiers and civilians killed by members of the Muslim Brotherhood on the page.

=== 10 August ===
The Syrian Observatory for Human Rights claimed one dead and 13 wounded by army operations, backed by one dozen armoured vehicles, in the northwestern towns of Sarmin and Taftanaz. Meanwhile, the military appeared to conclude the siege of Hama, withdrawing 40 APCs loaded with cheering soldiers from the city centre, according to a journalist on a government-organised tour. Turkish Prime Minister Recep Tayyip Erdoğan lauded the withdrawal and media access, both of which Davutoğlu had urged the previous day, as "a sign that our initiative is producing results". However, later in the day the Syrian government decided to put tanks back into Hama, and canceled the withdrawal. The government also announced its withdrawal from Ariha. Seventeen people were killed and 20 more injured by Syrian troops in Homs after the army opened fire on protesters, activists told the Agence France-Presse by telephone.

Syrian Ambassador to the United Nations Bashar Jaafari compared the situation in Syria to the ongoing English riots and said that just as in the United Kingdom and other countries, the Syrian government was democratically elected and not a "regime". The UK's representative sharply rebuked Jaafari's argument, saying, "In Syria, you have a situation where thousands of unarmed civilians are being attacked and many of them killed. That comparison made by the Syrian ambassador is ludicrous."

In a step The New York Times deemed previously unthinkable, 41 former Ba'ath and current government officials announced an initiative for political transition, and urged an end to the military crackdown on protestors. They were led by Mohammed Salman, a former minister of information with intimate ties to the Assads.

=== 11 August ===
A resident of Saraqeb, a town near the Turkish border, reported that over 60 vehicles, about 14 of which were reportedly tanks or APCs, entered the town. According to the report, Syrian soldiers began firing randomly and detaining residents en masse. The opposition Local Coordination Committees corroborated the report. In Qusayr in Homs Governorate, eleven people were reported killed as the army stormed the town. Two more residents of Hama were killed, according to Avaaz. The town of al-Musayfrah in Daraa governorate was the site of military operations at dawn. The army also shelled at least two neighbourhoods in Deir ez-Zour, Avaaz reported.

More mass Friday protests are planned by the Syrian opposition, this time under the title "Friday of 'We will not bow except for God'".

=== 12 August – "Friday of 'We Won't Kneel Except to God'" ===
Mass protests continued as twenty-three people were reportedly killed by Syrian forces across the country, including five in Saqba and Douma, suburbs of Damascus, when security forces fired on protesters shortly before Friday prayers. Troops killed protesters in Daraa, Deir ez-Zour, Idlib, Aleppo, Homs, Hama, and elsewhere, according to activists. They also allegedly fired on demonstrators in the Midan district of Damascus. The Local Coordination Committees reported from Aleppo that shabiha, or plainclothes pro-government militiamen, beat and stabbed dozens of people at a hundreds-strong protest in Syria's largest city. A similar scene played out in Zabadani, residents claimed, where shooting at a local mosque was also reported. Despite a security clampdown on the city of Homs, close to 20,000 people reportedly protested there after prayers.

=== 13 August ===
The Syrian army entered Latakia with more than 20 tanks and APCs and killed at least two civilians, according to activists. Activists in Deir ez-Zour also said a child was killed by a sniper. The Hürriyet Daily News, a Turkish daily, reported that a senior Turkish government official speaking on the condition of anonymity said a military intervention in Syria led by Turkey was an option. The report suggested Ankara is nervous over sectarian tension in Syria inflaming an already unstable situation in neighboring Iraq, which also experienced protests as part of the Arab Spring revolutionary wave. The LCC also reported a death in Qusayr, a death in Daraya, and a death in Hama.

=== 14 August ===
The LCC said that even as the army's artillery assault continued, the Syrian Navy was firing on Latakia with gunboats off the Mediterranean coast, killing at least 28, according to the Syrian Revolution Coordinators Union. Eight more civilians were killed elsewhere in the country, bringing the day's death toll to a minimum of 36, human rights activists and pro-democracy campaigners said. Syrian state news claimed two police and six armed criminals were killed in Latakia.

=== 15 August ===
Four to six more civilians were reportedly killed in Latakia as the siege dragged on. Turkish Foreign Minister Ahmet Davutoğlu demanded that the Syrian government's violent crackdown end "immediately and without conditions or excuses ... [or] there would be nothing more to discuss about steps that would be taken". In Houleh, an elderly man was shot dead by a sniper as the army began operations in the town, the Syrian Observatory for Human Rights claimed. Germany called on the European Union to take stronger action against the Assad administration by strengthening sanctions. A Palestinian refugee camp was among the targets of the shelling, residents, activists, and the UNRWA reported, drawing sharp condemnation from the Palestine Liberation Organization, among other groups. Twelve people were killed in Homs after post-iftar protests, Al Jazeera reported citing unnamed sources.

=== 16 August ===
Avaaz said it could confirm nine people in Latakia were killed during the day, Al Jazeera reported. Residents reported looting by shabiha in the al-Ramel neighborhood, where the Palestinian refugee camp is situated, as well as clearing of dead bodies, bullet casings, and other signs of shooting, and said thousands of people were trying to flee but many were being detained or forced to remain in the city. One resident said he feared his neighborhood would be razed to the ground. The Turkish government denied it had plans to create a border buffer zone, but said it was drafting plans for its next course of action if the crackdown continued. Nighttime protests were held in Homs, Albu Kamal, and several suburbs of Damascus, among other places in Syria, in defiance of the security operations.

=== 17 August ===
The Syrian government claimed it withdrew from Latakia and Deir ez-Zor, but Davutoğlu disputed this, saying Syrian troops remained in Deir ez-Zor and other centres of protest. He again reiterated Turkey's stance that "the bloodshed has to stop" and warned that "Turkey can naturally not remain indifferent" if the crackdown continued. Turkish Prime Minister Recep Tayyip Erdoğan compared the situation to the civil war in Libya and vented his frustration with the Syrian government, saying, "I've sent my foreign minister, and personally got in touch many times, the last of them three days ago on the phone. In spite of all this, civilians are still getting killed." The post-revolutionary interim government of Tunisia withdrew its ambassador from Damascus for "consultations". The United Nations reported that in a phone conversation with Secretary-General Ban Ki-moon, Assad claimed that all police and military operations against protesters had stopped. Despite Assad's assertion, activists reported between 9 and 16 deaths of protesters in Homs and said most of the shooting took place after evening prayers. Al Arabiya reported that "thousands" protested in a central square (Saadallah al-Jabiri square) of Aleppo, the city's largest demonstration to date, as well as various neighbourhoods of the city, before security forces attacked the people gathered there.

=== 18 August ===
The governments of Canada, France, Germany, the United Kingdom, and the United States all called for Assad to resign for the first time. Switzerland, despite its policy of neutrality, recalled its ambassador and condemned the violence. Avaaz reported afternoon raids of the al-Ramel neighbourhood, as well as shelling, including of at least one mosque, in Latakia despite Assad's claims that security operations had ended the previous day. The LCC reported continuing arrests and army activities in Deir ez-Zor, but did not report shooting. In a report documenting the uprising up until 14 July, the United Nations found that the Syrian government may have committed crimes against humanity and had practiced such tactics as summary execution, torture, use of indiscriminate force against civilians, and arbitrary arrests.

New massive protests are planned for Friday, this time under the title Friday of Beginnings of Victory.

=== 19 August – "Friday of Beginnings of Victory" ===
At least 23 people were allegedly killed across Syria, with 15 killed in Daraa Governorate, two killed in Douma and Harasta, and six killed in Homs. Six of the dead were killed when security forces stormed a village mosque in Inkhil, opposition activists claimed. About 6,000 people in Qadam, a Damascus suburb, reportedly chanted for President Assad to be tried at the International Criminal Court in The Hague. Security forces attempted to use tear gas to disperse the crowd, but when this failed, they opened fire with live ammunition, wounding at least five, activists and witnesses claimed. Lady Catherine Ashton, the European Union's head of foreign affairs, said the EU was making preparations for an embargo on Syrian oil. The Russian government dissented from the tougher stance adopted by the EU and many Western countries, with leading figures saying Assad "needs more time" to deliver on promised reforms.

=== 20 August ===
The death toll from the previous day rose to 34, and the Syrian army renewed a siege on Homs with army tanks, firing at the local population to keep them from rallying.

=== 21 August ===
In a media interview, Assad claimed he wanted to pursue reforms and pursue "terrorists". Assad warned against foreign intervention. Two people died in Hama when Shabbiha randomly opened fire on civilians in the street. The Syrian opposition gathered in Syria for talks on creating a rival government.

=== 22 August ===
As protests continued, the UN said the protester death toll had reached 2,200. The United Nations Human Rights Council voted to launch an investigation into crimes against humanity committed by the Syrian government, despite objections by Russia and the People's Republic of China. A UN team visited Homs to assess the humanitarian situation there and investigate claims of human rights abuses by Syrian authorities. Shortly after its departure, security forces reportedly opened fire on demonstrators in the city, leaving at least four dead, Human Rights Watch said.

=== 23 August ===
In Istanbul, Turkey, the National Council of Syria was announced to "represent the concerns and demands of the Syrian people". In Geneva, Switzerland, the United Nations Human Rights Council voted to condemn the Syrian government over its response to the uprising. At least 12 were killed in Idlib, Hama, and Homs governorates, the Arab Organization for Human Rights claimed.

=== 24 August ===
Despite the National Council's stated purpose in uniting all Syrian opposition groups, a Syrian Turkmen opposition activist complained that his community was marginalised and said he and other Syrian Turks were not invited to the council's formation, and then were accorded only observer status upon attending. A European Union official said the EU would likely place an embargo on Syrian oil within ten days. The Syrian Observatory for Human Rights reported that a woman was tortured to death in western Syria, while Al Jazeera reported that three civilians died amid raids in Homs, one protester was killed by snipers overnight in Nessieb, and five people were killed in an agricultural area outside Hama. The Arab Organization for Human Rights put the death toll for the day at 13, reporting several shootings of protesters in Deir ez-Zor and suburbs of Damascus as well, while the LCC said at least 17 were killed across Syria. The Russian Foreign Ministry, supported by the government of the People's Republic of China, released a statement urging the international community not to interfere with Syria's "internal affairs".

=== 25 August ===
Prominent political cartoonist Ali Ferzat was reportedly kidnapped and beaten by pro-government assailants before being released near Damascus International Airport. The identity of his attackers was unclear, with some attributing the beating to Syrian security forces. Some reports said both his hands were broken as a "warning" to dissuade him from drawing. Residents near Latakia and in Deir ez-Zor said they heard gunfire near their homes, the head of the Arab Organization for Human Rights claimed. The LCC said tanks again shelled Deir ez-Zor throughout the day, and at least 118 tanks were reported to be in Shuhail to the city's immediate southeast. The state-controlled Syrian Arab News Agency reported eight soldiers, including an army officer, were ambushed and killed in two separate attacks by "armed terrorist groups" in Homs Governorate the previous afternoon. The report said at least seven soldiers were wounded in one of the attacks when "terrorists" shot at a military bus in Talbisah. Iranian President Mahmoud Ahmadinejad offered a measured criticism of the Syrian government for the first time, calling for a national dialogue in a televised interview and saying, "When there is a problem between the people and their leaders, they must sit down together to reach a solution, away from violence." The Syrian opposition prepared to launch new Friday mass protests, this time dubbed under the name '"Friday of Patience and Steadfastness'".

=== 26 August – "Friday of Patience and Steadfastness" ===
On the last Friday of Ramadan, thousands protested in several Syrian cities, including Damascus, Deir ez-Zor, Deraa, Douma, Hama, Homs, and towns in Idlib Governorate, and security forces responded to many anti-government rallies with live fire and tear gas. 8 protesters were killed overnight when security forces attacked street demonstrations, activists said. The LCC said six people were injured in Qusayr after security forces shot at peaceful demonstrators. At least 3 protesters were reported slain in Deir ez-Zor during the day. Another protester was killed in Nawa, witnesses claimed, and another in Mleeha, one in Qaboun, one in Bosra, and one in Ma`arrat an-Nu`man. Many protesters carried placards congratulating the Libyan people on their progress in overthrowing Muammar Gaddafi. Tanks backed up security troops in many places, said residents of protest hotspots.

=== 27 August ===
Before dawn, protests erupted in Damascus, both in the suburbs and in the city centre. Multiple witnesses reported that a mosque was stormed in Kafarsouseh, a Damascus suburb, and thousands protested there against the government, though a crowd of government supporters turned out to chant slogans in support of Assad. Several protesters, as well as the mosque's 80-year-old imam, were reportedly injured. Security forces used live fire and tear gas against demonstrators in a square adjacent to the mosque, wounding at least five. Hundreds more protested in Moadamiya, another suburb, and in the Damascene neighbourhood of Tijana. A planned protest in Abaseen Square was largely thwarted, though about 60 protesters managed to march into the square before being dispersed. More protesters from Douma marched toward central Damascus, though protesters in the suburb of Saqba met live fire from security forces, leaving at least one dead, activists claimed. In Tehran's most direct warning to Syrian authorities yet, Iranian Foreign Minister Ali Akbar Salehi said protesters had "legitimate demands" and added, "The government should answer to the demands of its people, be it Syria, Yemen, or other countries." The Arab League also called on the Syrian government to end its crackdown. Two protesters were killed in Latakia and Qusayr, activists said.

=== 28 August ===
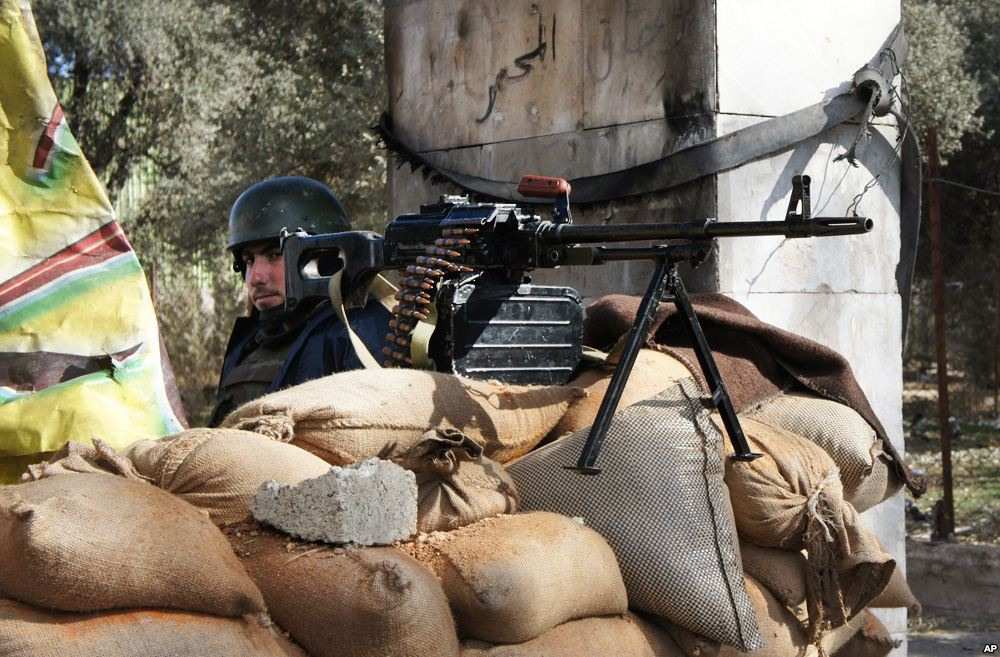
Security barrier in Damascus

London-based daily As-Sharq al-Awsat reported that Mohammad Rahhal, the leader of the LCC's Revolutionary Council, said the council had concluded that "what we are being subjected to today is a global conspiracy that can only be faced by an armed uprising". He said the council was now working to distribute weapons to protesters in order to combat the government's security crackdown. He criticised the international response to the Syrian uprising, saying, "Confronting this monster [the Syrian government] now requires arms, especially after it has become clear to everyone that the world only supports the Syrian uprising through speeches." He predicted the protest movement "will turn violent very soon". The Syrian Observatory for Human Rights reported five protesters were killed, including two who succumbed to mortal injuries from the previous day, and at least nine more were wounded. Residents of Qadam claimed a firefight between soldiers and army defectors who joined protesters took place in the Damascus suburb, though it was unclear if anyone was hurt or killed in the shooting. The Movement of Free Officers claimed "large defections" from Syrian security forces to the side of the protesters in Harasta, another Damascus suburb, and said a colonel in the Syrian Air Force who was involved in the secret police had been shot in the head in Saqba. The statement claimed shabiha and loyalist troops were pursuing the defectors into central Damascus. On the diplomatic front, the Arab League said it would send Secretary-General Naril Elaraby on a mission to Damascus in an "urgent" effort to end the crisis, while the Syrian government rejected the Arab League's statement.

=== 29 August ===
One person was reported killed in a dawn raid on Qara, a suburb of the capital, while five were said to have been killed and at least 60 injured in Sarmin, including a child, when security forces opened fire while conducting house-to-house searches. Five were wounded in Hit, Syria, near the Lebanese border, witnesses said. The crackdown in Hit reportedly prompted at least several dozen Syrians to flee into northern Lebanon. An activist in Homs told Bloomberg News that at least 15 people were killed and 400 injured as Syrian forces again laid siege to the city, though this number could not be confirmed. AFP reported, quoting an anonymous diplomat, that the EU had agreed "in principle" on a ban on importing Syrian oil, likely to be implemented by the end of the week. After Russia's envoy met with Assad, Moscow indicated "no change" in its stance of calling for reforms in Syria but opposing sanctions or other forms of international action. In Rastan, there were reports of dozens of conscripted soldiers of the Syrian army defecting to the opposition, where heavy gunfire and power outages were being reported, and a large armoured force surrounded the city.

=== 30 August ===
On the first day of Eid ul-Fitr, thousands demonstrated against the government in Deraa, Homs, and the suburbs of Damascus. Security forces opened fire on protesters, killing at least nine, the LCC said. Six were killed in Daraa Governorate, an activist said, including a 13-year-old boy. The LCC also reported raids in Rastan, Latakia, Al-Sanamayn, Qara, Qudsaya, Jableh, and Qamashli. Eid celebrations were reportedly muted, with many Syrians visiting graves of loved ones killed during the uprising.
