= May 2011 Homs massacre =

On Friday 6 May 2011, during the 2011 Syrian uprising or civil war, the Syrian military with tanks and troops started an attack on and occupation of Homs, Syria's third largest city with 650,000 inhabitants. Until 12 May they reportedly killed 37 residents and cut off water and medical care, held house-to-house raids to arrest hundreds of residents and shelled the town. On 13, 20, 21, 27 and 29 May, again 21 protesters reportedly were killed by security forces.

== Background ==
15 and 16 March 2011, demonstrations for democracy took place in six cities across Syria, the largest protest was in Daraa. This started a series of ever larger and angrier demonstrations all around Syria through March and April, with security forces firing on demonstrators resulting in hundreds of deaths. The protests spread, among other places, to Homs on Friday 18 March, after online calls for a "Friday of Dignity" (Arabic: جمعة الكرامة). 2,000 protesters then took to the streets in Homs after Friday prayers.

As protests in Syria continued, Homs became one of the most restive cities in Syria, with more protests on 25 and 29 March and 95 civilian deaths during protests on 1, 8, 17–19, 22 and 29 April 2011. On 25 April, the Syrian government had intensified its crackdown on the protests with an organised military attack on the city of Daraa, on 26 April on Douma.

== Timeline ==
On 6 May 2011, Homs became, after Daraa on 25 April, the second centre of the Syrian protests and uprising to be confronted with a large scale, organised, deadly attack by the Syrian military.

- 30 April until 5 May: Armored units isolated Homs.
- 4+5 May: Tanks took up positions near the centre of Homs.
- 5 May: Despite the crackdown, a small anti-government demonstration was held. Dozens of tanks and troop transporters were sent to Homs.
- Friday 6 May, ”Friday of Defiance”: Armored units cut all communications in Homs and entered the city with tanks, and according to an activist the military took up positions inside the city. Residents gathered for protest; security forces without further provocation opened fire on them right away, some residents said over the telephone. 16 protesters were killed, and 9 soldiers defected to their side, activists said.

”Armed terrorist groups” attacked a military checkpoint killing five soldiers and policemen; in chasing those groups and clashing with them another six soldiers were killed, government and military sources said.

- 6–8 May: Armored units arrested scores of males.
- 7–30 May (or longer): neighbourhood Baba Amr was closed off by security forces with several roadblocks, ‘under siege’. At least until 11 May it was also cut off from water, electricity and medical care, the resident said.
- 8 May: Early morning, troops and tanks entered Homs´ neighbourhoods Bab Sebaa, Baba Amr, Bab Baba and Sebaa Amr amid the sound of gunfire, activists said. Syrian troops began hunting opponents of President Assad in Homs. Snipers were on rooftops in Bab Sebaa and a dozen unarmed protesters in Homs were killed by security forces, activists said.

State media reported that an “armed terrorist group” attacked a bus in Homs, killing 10 people and wounding three. Some soldiers(s) and officer(s) were killed by “armed terrorist groups”, the military said.

- 9 May: Troops cut electricity and telephone lines in Homs and divided up the city to prevent any mass protests, activists said. Security forces carried out house-to-house raids, targeting demonstrators, the Syrian Observatory for Human Rights said; hundreds were arrested, activists said.

Tanks were dispersed and security check-points set up at the entrance to each suburb, searching anyone passing through, a residential doctor in Homs said; health centers and a school were transformed into command centers for security forces, he said.

- 10 May: A central Homs resident told the BBC that there were no longer any armed security personnel on the streets, but at night again 100 people were arrested in Homs, activists said.
- 11 May: At dawn hundreds of troops entered Bab Amr and began shelling. There were heavy machine gunfire and explosions from tank shelling in Bab Amr and nearby villages, activists and a rights campaigner said.

Activists reported nine people killed in Bab Amr and nearby villages and dozens wounded. Between 4 and 11 May, 500 people were arrested in Homs, according to activists. State news agency SANA reported troops having “arrested dozens of wanted men and seized large quantities of weapons and ammonition” in Bab Amr.

- 12 May: Naji (or Najati) Tayara, a veteran human rights campaigner, was arrested in Homs.
- Friday 13 May: During protests, three demonstrators were shot dead by security forces, activists said.
- Friday 20 May: 2,000 anti-government demonstrators gathered in Homs; police cars drove into the crowd to disperse them, hitting several protesters; one of those cars crashed into a wall, police officers jumped out and opened fire, killing six people, witnesses said. In the al-Wa'r neighbourhood, security forces stormed a hospital, killing three residents, a witness said; elsewhere three more people were killed, and some locals shot at the police with handguns, witnesses said.
- 21 May: Security forces fired directly on funeral marches, killing some, activists said.
- 22 May: Prisoners in a Homs' jail smuggled out a distress call about the terrible circumstances under which allegedly hundreds were being held.
- Friday 27 May: Security forces shot dead 3 protesters, campaigners said.
- 29 May: A bus carrying students was shot at by troops or security forces, killing the driver's assistant, activists and residents said.
- 30 May: In Bab Amr at dawn two dead bodies were found, an activist said. Perhaps seven protestors and one member of security forces were killed in clashes.

== Aftermath ==
This May 2011 operation did not quell protests in Homs, nor subdue the city: October–November 2011, rebels in Homs’ Baba Amr neighbourhood ambushed government's security forces. More uprising and warlike events occurred until May 2014 in Homs, after July 2012 all unmistakably events of the Syrian Civil War that by then undisputedly was taking place in Syria.
