= Wafa Telecom =

Third mobile operator in Syria

- Native name: وفا تيليكوم
- Founded: 2017
- Defunct: December 2024
- Headquarters: Abd Al-Rahman Shahbander Street, Damascus
- Area served: Syria
- Key people: Ghassan Saba (CEO)
- Products: Mobile network operator, GSM, 3G, 4G / LTE, 5G
- Services: Telecommunications & Data
- Website: wafa-telecom.com/en/

Wafa Telecom (Arabic: وفا تيليكوم) was the third mobile operator in Syria. The other two being Syriatel and MTN Syria.

It was granted the exclusive rights to operate 5G in Syria. They performed the first test of the technology in 2023. The company planned to build 750 radio stations by the start of 2023. They aimed to acquire 1.5 million users in three years and cover 80% of Syria in 5 years and 90% of it in 10 years.

Its ownership had links to Iran's Revolutionary Guard.

== History ==
Wafa was established in 2017. On February 21, 2022, Syria's telecommunications authority granted the company a mobile license. It is the third company in Syria to get that license.

In December 2024, the company closed after the fall of the Assad regime.

== Ownership ==
Two senior businessmen told Reuters that "Influential businessmen with close ties to government officials are key investors in the company". Other various local sources also reported that company is directly linked with the presidential palace.

=== Iranian links ===
An investigation between Organized Crime and Corruption Reporting Project (OOCRP) and the Observatory of Political and Economic Networks revealed a hidden link between the company and Iran Revolutionary Guard. Arabian Business Company (ABC), which owns 52% of Wafa Telecom, is itself owned by a Malaysian company called Tioman Golden Treasure. This Malaysian company is owned by Iranian Azim Monzavi which is sanctioned by the U.S which described him as "An IRGC official who facilitates oil sales".

While Iran has not officially acknowledged ownership of Wafa, it signed a contract for cooperation in communication (a mobile network operator) with Syria in 2017. The head of the joint commission for economic cooperation between Iran and Syria mentioned in 2023 that Iran is launching a mobile operator in Syria soon. But didn't confirm whether it is Wafa or another company.
