= Rosemary DiCarlo =

American diplomat (born 1947)

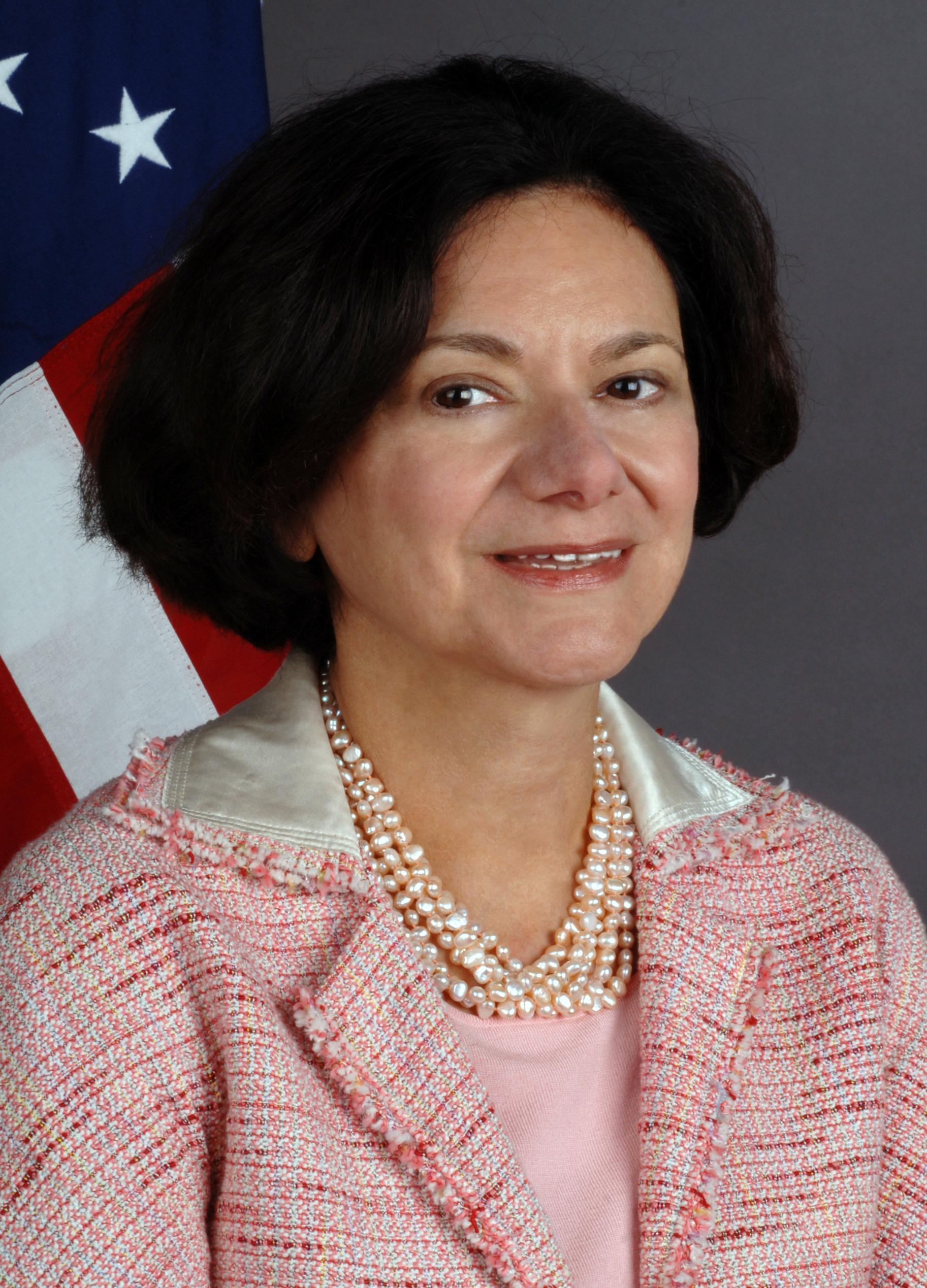
- Official portrait, 2005

United Nations Under-Secretary-General for Political and Peacebuilding Affairs
- Incumbent
- Assumed office May 2018
- Appointed by: António Guterres
- Preceded by: Jeffrey Feltman

United States Ambassador to the United Nations
- Acting
- In office June 30, 2013 – August 5, 2013
- President: Barack Obama
- Preceded by: Susan Rice
- Succeeded by: Samantha Power

Personal details
- Born: 1947 (age 78–79)
- Spouse: Thomas Graham
- Education: Brown University (BA, MA, PhD)

Rosemary Anne DiCarlo (born 1947) is an American diplomat who has served as United Nations Under-Secretary-General for Political and Peacebuilding Affairs since May 2018. She previously served as acting United States Ambassador to the United Nations following the resignation of Susan Rice to become the National Security Advisor.

== Early life and education ==
DiCarlo graduated from Brown University with a B.A., M.A. and Ph.D. in comparative literature, as well as Slavic languages and literature. She speaks French and Russian.

== Career ==
Before joining the United States Foreign Service, DiCarlo was a member of the secretariat of the United Nations Educational, Scientific and Cultural Organization (UNESCO).

DiCarlo later became a career member of the foreign service and has held overseas assignments in U.S. Embassies in Moscow and Oslo. As director for democratic initiatives for the New Independent States, she oversaw an initiative to promote democratization in the former Soviet republics. She also held the position of U.S. Coordinator for the Stability Pact for South Eastern Europe at the Department of State. On October 5, 2006, she attended the opening of the United States Embassy to Montenegro in Podgorica.

Following her appointment by President Barack Obama in 2010, DiCarlo served as deputy permanent representative to the United Nations with the rank and status of ambassador extraordinary and plenipotentiary from 2011 until 2014. In July 2013, she served as President of the UN Security Council.

Following her career in government, DiCarlo served as the president and chief executive officer of the nonprofit National Committee on American Foreign Policy. She took up this role in August 2015. In addition, she was a senior fellow and lecturer at Yale University's Jackson Institute for Global Affairs, where she taught “Multilateral Institutions in the 21st Century,” a class offered to Yale graduate students.

On March 28, 2018, DiCarlo was named Under-Secretary-General for Political Affairs of the United Nations by Secretary-General António Guterres, succeeding Jeffrey Feltman. She is the first woman to hold that post.

== Other activities ==
- Council on Foreign Relations, member
- Dag Hammarskjöld Fund for journalists, member of the honorary advisory council (since 2018)
- Women's Foreign Policy Group (WFPG), member
- Women in International Security (WIIS), member
- International Gender Champions (IGC), member
- International House of New York, member of the board of trustees
- Global Cities, Inc., member of the advisory board (since 2015)

== Recognition ==
DiCarlo is a recipient of the U.S. Presidential Meritorious Service Award and the Department of State's Sustained Superior Achievement, Superior Honor and Meritorious Awards. She was awarded the Presidential Medal of Merits from the President of the Republic of Kosovo and the Presidential Medal of the Order of Skanderbeg from the President of the Republic of Albania. She received an honorary doctorate from the University “Haxhi Zeka” in Peja, Kosovo.

Diplomatic posts
| Preceded by Susan Rice | United States Ambassador to the United Nations; Acting; 2013 | Succeeded by Samantha Power |
