= United Nations Department of Political and Peacebuilding Affairs =

Department of the Secretariat of the United Nations

Department of Political and Peacebuilding Affairs

- Abbreviation: DPPA
- Formation: 1992; 34 years ago
- Type: Department of the Secretariat
- Legal status: Active
- Head: Under-Secretary-General for Political and Peacebuilding Affairs – Rosemary DiCarlo
- Parent organization: United Nations Secretariat
- Website: dppa.un.org/en

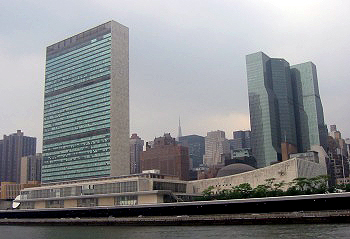
The Department of Political Affairs is headquartered at the Secretariat in New York City

The United Nations Department of Political and Peacebuilding Affairs (DPPA) is a department of the Secretariat of the United Nations (UN) with responsibility for monitoring and assessing global political developments and advising and assisting the UN secretary-general and his envoys in the peaceful prevention and resolution of conflict around the world. The department manages field-based political missions in Africa, Central Asia, and the Middle East, and has been increasing its professional capacities in conflict mediation and preventive diplomacy. DPPA also oversees UN electoral assistance to Member States of the organization. Established in 1992, the department's responsibilities also include providing secretariat support to the UN Security Council and two standing committees created by the General Assembly concerning the Rights of the Palestinian People and Decolonization. DPPA is based at the UN headquarters in New York City.

== Staffing ==
- Rosemary DiCarlo – Under-Secretary-General for Political and Peacebuilding Affairs
- Oscar Fernandez-Taranco – Assistant Secretary-General for Peacebuilding Support
- Bintou Keita – Assistant Secretary-General for Africa, DRC lead
- Miroslav Jenča – Assistant Secretary-General for Europe, Central Asia and Americas
- Mohamed Khaled Khiari – Assistant Secretary-General for Middle East, Asia and the Pacific

On 28 March 2018, UN secretary-general António Guterres announced the appointment of Rosemary DiCarlo of the United States, President of the National Committee on American Foreign Policy and Senior Fellow at the Jackson Institute for Global Affairs, Yale University, as Under-Secretary-General for Political Affairs. DiCarlo succeeded Jeffrey D. Feltman of the United States, who completed his assignment on 31 March 2018.

== Former under-secretaries-general ==
This table lists the former under-secretaries-general (USGs) who served:

- under the Department of Political and Security Council Affairs (1952–1992)
- under the Department of Political Affairs (1992–2019)
- under the Department of Political and Peacebuilding Affairs (2019–)

Former heads of DPPA and DPPA predecessors
Under-Secretary-General	Country of nationality	Years served	UN Secretary-General
Konstantin Zinchenko	Soviet Union	1952	Trygve Lie
Ilya S. Tchernychev	Soviet Union	1953–1954	Dag Hammarskjöld
Dragoslav Protitch	Soviet Union	1955–1957	Dag Hammarskjöld
Anatoly F. Dobrynin	Soviet Union	1958-1959	Dag Hammarskjöld
Georgy Arkadev	Soviet Union	1960–1961	Dag Hammarskjöld
E.D. Kiselyv	Soviet Union	1962	U Thant
V.P. Suslov	Soviet Union	1963–1964	U Thant
Alexei E. Nesterenko	Soviet Union	1965–1967	U Thant
Leonid N. Kutakov	Soviet Union	1968–1972	U Thant
Arkady N. Shevchenko	Soviet Union	1973–1977	Kurt Waldheim
Mikhail D. Sytenko	Soviet Union	1978–1980	Kurt Waldheim
Viacheslav A. Ustinov	Soviet Union	1981–1986	Javier Pérez de Cuéllar
Vasily S. Safronchuk	Soviet Union	1987–1991	Javier Pérez de Cuéllar
1 March 1992: The Department of Political Affairs (DPA) is formed. DPA absorbs the Department of Political and Security Council Affairs, the Office for Political and General Assembly Affairs and Secretariat Services (OPGS), and the Office for Special Political Questions, Regional Cooperation, Decolonization and Trusteeship (SPQRCDT).
Vladimir F. Petrovsky	Russia	1992–1993 (Note: USG Vladimir F. Petrovsky jointly headed the newly-created DPA with USG James O.C Jonah, whose Office for Special Political Questions, Regional Cooperation, Decolonization and Trusteeship merged into DPA.)	Boutros Boutros-Ghali
James O.C. Jonah	Sierra Leone	1992–1994 (Note: 1992-1993: USG James O.C. Jonah jointly headed the newly-created DPA with USG Vladimir F. Petrovsky. From 1993-1994, he co-headed DPA with USG Marrack Goulding.)	Boutros Boutros-Ghali
Marrack Goulding	United Kingdom	1993–1997	Boutros Boutros-Ghali
Kieran Prendergast	United Kingdom	1997–2005	Kofi Annan
Ibrahim Gambari	Nigeria	2005–2007	Kofi Annan
B. Lynn Pascoe	United States	2007–2012	Ban Ki-moon
Jeffrey D. Feltman	United States	2012–2018	Ban Ki-moon António Guterres
Rosemary A. DiCarlo	United States	2018–present	António Guterres

== Field missions ==
As of December 2016, the DPA manages the following political missions and peace-building support offices engaged in conflict prevention, peacemaking and post-conflict peacebuilding in Africa, Central Asia and the Middle East:

In Africa

- UNIOGBIS, United Nations Integrated Peace-building Support Office in Guinea-Bissau
- UNOCA, United Nations Office for Central Africa
- UNOWAS, United Nations Office for West Africa and the Sahel
- UNSMIL, United Nations Support Mission in Libya
- UNSOM, United Nations Assistance Mission in Somalia

In Asia

- UNAMA, United Nations Assistance Mission in Afghanistan
- UNRCCA, United Nations Regional Centre for Preventive Diplomacy in Central Asia

In the Middle East

- UNAMI, United Nations Assistance Mission for Iraq
- UNSCO, Office of the United Nations Special Coordinator for the Middle East Peace Process
- UNSCOL, Office of the United Nations Special Coordinator for Lebanon

In South America

- UNVIC, United Nations Verification Mission in Colombia

These DPA-led field operations are headed by senior representatives of the Secretary-General and provide a forward platform for preventive diplomacy and other activities across a range of disciplines, to help prevent and resolve conflict or to build lasting peace in nations emerging from civil wars. The peace-building offices, currently active in Burundi, Guinea-Bissau, the Central African Republic and Sierra Leone aim to help nations consolidate peace through comprehensive peace-building strategies developed and carried out in coordination with national actors and U.N. development and humanitarian entities on the ground. Political missions are part of a continuum of UN peace operations working in different stages of the conflict cycle. In some instances, following the signing of peace agreements, political missions overseen by the Department of Political Affairs during the stage of peace negotiations have been replaced by peacekeeping missions. In other instances, U.N. peacekeeping operations have given way to special political missions overseeing longer-term peace-building activities.

Good Offices missions

In addition to the field-based missions currently under its supervision, DPA provides guidance and support to traveling envoys and special advisers of the Secretary-General bringing to bear his "good offices" for the resolution of conflicts or the implementation of other UN mandates. These currently include UN envoys or special advisers for Cyprus, Yemen, Syria, Western Sahara, and the Macedonian-Greek naming dispute.

Investigative Mandates and Fact-Finding Missions

DPA has also assisted in establishing and providing support to various UN investigative and fact-finding bodies. These have included: the International Commission Against Impunity in Guatemala (CICIG); the United Nations Commission of Inquiry into the assassination of Benazir Bhutto, the former Prime Minister of Pakistan; the International Commission of Inquiry on the 28 September 2009 events in Guinea; and the United Nations International Investigation Commission in the assassination of former Lebanese Prime Minister Rafik Hariri.

== See also ==
- United Nations Department of Peacekeeping Operations
- United Nations Secretariat
- Justice Call
