= Zain Syria =

Mobile operator in Syria

- Industry: Communications services
- Founded: 2026

Zain Syria is part of Zain Group and is the future 2nd mobile operator in Syria. Zain is replacing MTN Syria after winning the international tender held by the Ministry of Communications and Information Technology and are in a transitional handover period until Q1 2027 as of July 2026.

== History ==
On 3 March 2026, the Ministry of Communications announced an international tender for a mobile license to replace MTN Syria after MTN Group wanted to exit the Syrian market.

On 30 June 2026, the ministry announced that Zain won the international tender following a 747 million USD bid. It was announced to the public at the "New Mobile Network Operator Announcement Ceremony" in Damascus.

== Plans for launch ==
Starting July 2026, Zain will work with MTN and the Syrian MCOT in a 6-month transitional period to ensure the services for 6.3m Syrian MTN subscribers. They will also be investing 800m USD into 5G networks and other AI-powered technologies over the next decade. The Syrian government will own 25% of the brand while Zain Group will own 75% while the targeted commercial launch for the Zain Syria brand is planned for Q1 2027.
