= Oscar Fernandez-Taranco =

Argentine diplomat (born 1957)

Oscar Fernandez-Taranco (born 1957) is an Argentinian economist who has been serving as the United Nations Assistant Secretary-General for Development Coordination under the leadership of Secretary General António Guterres since 2022.

== Early life and education ==
A citizen of Argentina, Fernandez-Taranco studied economics at Cornell University and urban-regional economic planning at the Massachusetts Institute of Technology.

== Career ==
From 2014 to 2022, Fernandez-Taranco served as Assistant Secretary General for Peacebuilding Support; his first term was extended in 2018. Prior to this appointment on 2 September 2014, he served as Assistant Secretary-General for Political Affairs in the UN Department of Political Affairs.

Prior to his appointment as Assistant Secretary-General for Political Affairs, he was Resident Coordinator in the United Republic of Tanzania. Between 1998 and 2001, he served as Resident Representative, UN Resident Coordinator and Deputy Special Representative of the Secretary-General in Haiti.

From 1994 to 1998, he was Deputy Special Representative of the Administrator of the West Bank and Gaza Programme of Assistance to the Palestinian people. For five years, he also served as Deputy Assistant Administrator and Deputy Regional Director in the Regional Bureau of Arab States in the United Nations Development Programme.

He joined the UN as a volunteer in Benin.

== Other activities ==
Fernandez-Taranco is a member of the Interpeace Governing Council.

== See also ==
- UN Biography of Oscar Fernandez-Taranco
