= Syriatel =

Telecommunication company in Syria

- Native name: سيريتل
- Type: Public
- ISIN: SY0031100322
- Industry: Telecommunications
- Founded: 18 November 2001
- Headquarters: Damascus, Syria
- Key people: Murid Al-Atasi (CEO)
- Products: GSM, 3G, 4G / LTE, 5G
- Revenue: 4,019,895,179,000 Syrian pound (2025)
- Operating income: 423,708,547,414 Syrian pound (2023)
- Net income: 1,044,835,423,000 Syrian pound (2025)
- Total assets: 4,154,894,751,000 Syrian pound (2025)
- Number of employees: 3,931 (2022)
- Website: syriatel.sy

Syriatel (Arabic: سيريتل) is one of two mobile network providers in Syria, the others being Zain Syria, took over from MTN Syria. Syriatel offers LTE with 150 Mb/s speeds, under the brand name Super Surf. It is headquartered on Sehnaya Road in Damascus.

== History ==
Former logo from 2006 until 2024.

Syriatel was founded in January 2000, with its headquarters in Damascus, Syria. The Government licenses two private companies to supply mobile phone services, Syriatel and "94". Orascom provided the management. The license with the Government was a Build-own-transfer (BOT) contract for 15 years.

In 2011, the European Union imposed sanctions on Syriatel in order to intensify pressure on Syrian President Bashar al-Assad.

In 2017, Syriatel introduced 4G speeds offering 150 Mb/s speeds, branded Super Surf. On 5 June 2020, a Syrian court ordered Syriatel be placed under judicial custody.

== Ownership ==
=== Board of Directors ===
As per official disclosure (15 February 2026) for the period ending 31 December 2025.

- Executive President / CEO: Murid Sakhr Al-Atasi

No.	Name	Role	Represented Entity	Ownership %
1	Ahmed Yahya Maqsouma	Chairman of the Board of Directors	Al-Bayaz Private Joint-Stock Company (شركة لابياز المساهمة المغفلة الخاصة)	18.39%
2	Malek Mahmoud Al-Jayyoush	Vice Chairman of the Board of Directors	Sibrit Private Joint-Stock Company (شركة سيبريت المساهمة المغفلة الخاصة)	18.39%
3	Mohammad Safwan Sari Al-Husami	Board Member	Freedom Private Joint-Stock Company (شركة فريدوم المساهمة المغفلة الخاصة)	19.64%
4	Waddah Ghalib Hafez Kayyal	Board Member	Sample Private Joint-Stock Company (شركة سامبل المساهمة المغفلة الخاصة)	11.41%
5	Rami Mouaffak Sawan	Board Member (Authorized to Sign)	Independent (مستقل)	0%

=== History ===
When the company was founded in 2000, Syriatel was owned by the Egyptian telecommunications company Orascom (25%) and Rami Makhlouf (75%), a cousin of then-Syrian president Bashar al-Assad. In 2003, Orascom sold its ownership in Syriatel.

Until the fall of the Assad regime, the company was owned by Rami Makhlouf. The company had approximately 3,500 employees and 8 million customers as of 2016.

As of 2025, major shareholders include Ahmed Yahya Maqsouma (18.39%) and others, per official disclosures, reflecting diffused post-Makhlouf ownership amid ongoing economic reconfiguration.

== Technologies ==
Syriatel operate a network of GSM 900 / 1800 & 3G 2100 & 4G 1800 cellular networks.
