= MTN Syria =

Mobile operator in Syria

- ISIN: SY0031100330
- Industry: Telecommunications
- Predecessor: Investcom
- Founded: June 29, 2002
- Headquarters: Damascus, Syria
- Area served: Syria
- Key people: Mohammed Hamdoun
- Products: Mobile network operator, Internet services
- Services: Telecommunications & Data
- Revenue: 362,575,590,450 Syrian pound (2022)
- Operating income: 47,064,621,763 Syrian pound (2022)
- Net income: 36,432,181,026 Syrian pound (2022)
- Total assets: 504,483,310,523 Syrian pound (2022)
- Owner: TeleInvest
- Number of employees: 1281 (October 2012)
- Parent: TeleInvest Ltd, subsidiary of Dallah Al-Baraka
- Website: mtnsyr.com

MTN Syria is one of the two only mobile operators in Syria, the other being Syriatel. MTN Syria was previously known as "Areeba". It offers GSM, 3.5G and 4G (LTE) broadband and mobile services.

In 2020, MTN Group decided to sell the remaining of 75% of its share in MTN Syria to the Saudi-owned TeleInvest Ltd, which already owns 25% of the company.

On 3 March 2026, the Syrian Ministry of Communications and Information Technology announced the launch of an international tender for a new mobile license to replace MTN Syria's license, following negotiations over MTN's orderly exit from the Syrian market.

The new license will include advanced frequency allocations, and current MTN Syria subscribers are expected to be automatically transferred to the incoming operator. The tender process is scheduled to be completed by 15 June 2026.

On 30 June 2026, the Syrian Ministry of Communications and Information Technology announced that Kuwaiti telecommunications company Zain Group has won the tender at the "New Mobile Network Operator Announcement Ceremony" in Damascus. Zain Group announced it will commercially launch the Zain Syria brand in Q1 2027, thus ending the 24-year MTN era.

== Statistics (October 2012) ==
Active subscribers	5.978.660
Population coverage	99.5%
Geographical coverage	80%
Technologies	2G, 3G, 3.5G, LTE
Retail Base	3735
Current status	Active
