= Zoubi family =

Large Arab clan in Syria, Jordan and Israel

Zoubi الزعبي
- Country: Syria; Jordan; Israel

The Zoubi (Arabic: الزعبي, romanized: al-Zuʾbī), also called Al al-Zu'bi and al-Zu'biyya, is a large Arab clan or tribe with a significant presence in southern Syria, northern Jordan and northern Israel. The family traditionally provided the leaders of the Sufi order of Qadiriyya in the Hauran, from which they derived their political presige in that region, even after the decline of Sufism in the early 20th century. Members of the family have frequently served in political office in Syria (including Mahmoud Al-Zoubi, Prime Minister between 1987 and 2000), Jordan and Israel until the present day.

== Origins ==
The Zoubi family claims descent from the Islamic prophet Muhammad, by way of their claiming descent from the 11th-century Sufi mystic and purported descendant of Muhammad, Abdul Qadir Gilani. The Zoubi trace their lineage from Abdul Qadir through their ancestor Imad ibn Nur al-Din, who came from Iraq and whose tomb is located in al-Musayfirah in the Hauran, and his three sons Amr, Abu Bakr and Muhammad. A document dated to 1591 and which had been kept by relatives of the family in Hama, affirms the Zoubi family's relationship to Abdul Qadir.

== Locations ==
The Zoubi (or Zu'bi) are the largest of the many extended, agricultural clans of the Hauran plains in southern Syria and northern Jordan. They also settled in the adjoining Beisan Valley near the Jordan River and in and around Nazareth in the Galilee (Palestine region), now both in Israel. Although the Zoubi have been settled cultivators for centuries, they share much in culture with the Bedouin. As of 2014, they were numbering some 160,000 members in southern Syria and northern Jordan, not including those in Israel.

The clan inhabits some sixteen villages in the Daraa and Izra districts of the Daraa Governorate in southern Syria. They are predominant in the governorate capital of Daraa and the surrounding villages of Ataman, Da'el, al-Jiza, Khirbet Ghazaleh, al-Musayfirah, Muzayrib, Nasib, al-Na'ima, Saida, al-Ta'iba, Tafas and al-Yadudah. In Syria, the traditional seat of the Zoubi from the time of its mid-20th-century paramount sheikh, Muhammad Muflih al-Zoubi, was Khirbet Ghazaleh. Before him, under the leadership of his predecessor, Faris al-Zoubi, its main political seat was Deir al-Bukht. Its religious center was at al-Musayfirah, the burial place of its wali (saintly figure or patron saint).

In Jordan, the clan has an extensive presence in the Irbid Governorate, particularly in the cities of al-Ramtha and Irbid. Peake noted in the 1930s that the places they lived in the then-Emirate of Transjordan were Ramtha, al-Shajara, and Thneibeh (on the Syrian border) in the Ramtha subdistrict of Jabal Ajlun; Juffein in the Kura subdistrict of Jabal Ajlun; Kherja and Harima in the Wastiya subdistrict of Jabal Ajlun; and Salt in the Balqa district. In Jordan, its chief center is Ramtha. The Zu'bis of Ramtha were traditionally responsible for the tomb of another wali of the family, the sheikh Rashid Ibrahim Mustafa al-Zu'bi.

In Israel, the Zoubi clan are predominant in the villages of Nein, Na'ura, Sulam, Tamra, ed-Dahi, Taybeh, all east of the city of Afula in the Jezreel (Marj Ibn Amer) and Beisan valleys. The Zoubi are also one of the principal Muslim families in the nearby city of Nazareth.

== History ==
=== Syria ===
The Zoubi family provided the leaders of the Qadiriyya, the Sufi order of Abdul Qadir, in the Hauran. The leaders of the Zoubi family derived their prestige and influence from this role in the Hauran villages where the Qadiriyya was present. This influence continued even after Sufi practices and identity in the region were shed in the first half of the 20th century. During the French Mandatory period in Syria (1920–1946), the Zoubi were rivals of the Hariri clan, which inhabited many of the same villages where they resided. The paramount leaders of the Hariri were more identified with Syria's nationalist movement, while those of the Zoubi aligned with the French authorities. This was at least partly due to the Sufi inclination toward the governing authorities. Consequently, during the post-independence period, the Hariri gained advantage with the Syrian nationalist governments. With the rise of the Ba'ath Party to power in 1963 the political influence and economic power of the traditional leaders of both the Zoubi and Hariri diminished. The lower-ranking members of the Zoubi became the predominant local influence under the Ba'ath, with members serving in all the major factions of the party since 1963. Among these were Musa Al-Zoubi, a close ally of President Amin al-Hafiz in 1963–1965, Muhammad Al-Zoubi, an ally of strongman Salah Jadid and member of the powerful Regional Council in 1964–1966, and most prominently, Mahmoud Al-Zoubi, a top ally of President Hafez al-Assad, who served as Speaker of the People's Assembly in 1986–1987 and Prime Minister in 1987–2000. The political influence of the Zoubi subsequently declined under President Bashar al-Assad (2000–2024), who showed more favor to the Hariri.

=== Jordan ===
As in Syria, the Zu'bis of Ramtha had originally derived their political and economic influence from their role as Sufi leaders. According to Frederick Peake, the power and influence of the Zoubi family in Ramtha stemmed from their alliance with Ahmad Pasha al-Jazzar, the Acre-based governor of Sidon and Damascus, in the last quarter of the 18th century. They provided military backing for his campaigns against the Zayadina (family of Daher al-Umar) based in the Galilee and the Al Hammad of Kura in Jabal Ajlun. The sheikh of the Zoubi in Ramtha received an annual stipend from Jazzar for his support. Some members of the Zoubi clan had been resident in the village of al-Qasfiya in the Siru subdistrict of Jabal Ajlun which was a waqf (endowment) and burial place of the Zoubi sheikh Taha Abu Hammamat ibn Bakkar. They moved to Juffein in the Kura subdistrict in the early 19th century. The governor of Jabal Ajlun issued a document addressed to the inhabitants of Kura dated to 1821 proclaiming the Zoubi sheikh Muhammad ibn Isa and his relatives in Kafr Alma to be noblemen protected by the state and exempt from taxes with their only obligation being to offer hospitality. A segment of the clan settled further south in Salt in the Balqa where they claimed to have been resident since the late 18th century, having moved there from al-Musayfirah and a village called Nahla.

=== Palestine and Israel ===
The head of the Zoubi family in the 1930s, during the period of Mandatory Palestine, was Muhammad Said, who was based in the village of Nein. During the 1936-1939 Palestinian revolt, members of the Zoubi largely sided with the opposition to Amin al-Husayni. The British authorities arrested Muhammad Said but released him after the intercession of the Emir of Transjordan, Abdullah, with whom Muhammad had close ties.

Muhammad Said and his brother and son, Seif el-Din el-Zoubi, facilitated the sale of Zoubi family-owned lands east of Mount Tabor to the Jewish National Fund. In retaliation for this and his opposition to Amin al-Husayni, two abortive attempts were made to assassinate Seif el-Din in 1947. During the 1948 Palestine war, a peace agreement was forged between the leaders of the Zoubi family and the neighboring Jewish settlements, leading to accusations by the Arab Liberation Army that Seif el-Din was a Zionist agent. Following the Israeli victory in the war, he served as an intermediary between the Israeli authorities and the Arab inhabitants of the Nazareth area.

== Notable members ==
- Mahmoud Al-Zoubi (1935–2000), Prime Minister of Syria from 1987 to 2000
- Bashar al-Zoubi, Commander-in-Chief of the Free Syrian Army
- Abd el-Aziz el-Zoubi (1926–1974), Israeli politician, member of the Knesset 1965–1974 and Deputy Minister of Health
- Abdel Rahman Zuabi (1932–2014), Israeli judge, Supreme Court justice in 1999
- Ahmad Hasan Al Zoubi (born 1975), Jordanian columnist, playwright and satirist
- Omran al-Zoubi (born 1959), Syrian Minister of Information
- Seif el-Din el-Zoubi (1913–1986), Israeli politician, member of the Knesset 1949–1959, 1965–1979
- Zu'bi M.F. Al-Zu'bi, Jordanian academic leader and economic advisor
- Haneen Zoabi (born 1969), Israeli politician, member of the Knesset 2009–2019

== Sources ==
- Batatu, Hanna (1999). Syria's Peasantry, the Descendants of Its Lesser Rural Notables, and Their Politics. Princeton University Press. ISBN 0691002541.
- Cohen, Hillel (2008). Army of Shadows: Palestinian Collaboration with Zionism, 1917–1948. Translated by Haim Watzman. Berkely and Los Angeles: University of California Press. ISBN 978-0-520-25221-9.
- Dukhan, Haian (2019). State and Tribes in Syria: Informal Alliances and Conflict Patterns. Abingdon, UK and New York: Routledge. ISBN 978-1-351-02542-3.
- Fischbach, Michael (2000). State, Society and Land in Jordan. Leiden: Brill. ISBN 90-04-11912-4.
- Heras, Nicholas A. (June 2014). "A Profile of Syria's Strategic Dar'a Province". CTC Sentinel. 7 (6). Combating Terrorism Center: 20–23.
- Peake, Frederick Gerard (1934). A History of Trans-Jordan and its Tribes, Vol. 2. Amman.
- Raglan, Lord (1925). "Lord Balfour in Palestine". The English Review. 40: 581–.
- Srouji, Elias S. (2003). Cyclamens from Galilee: Memoirs of a Physician from Nazareth. ISBN 978-0-595-30304-5.
- Vial-Benamra, Gaspard (2024). "Questing for Land: Chechen Villages in the Shaping of Transjordan, an Overview". In Al Husseini, Jalal; Napolitano, Valentina; Neveu, Norig (eds.). Migrations in Jordan: Reception Policies and Settlement Strategies. I. B. Tauris. ISBN 978-0-7556-0684-9.
