= Al-Ghariyah al-Gharbiyah =

Al Ghariyah al-Gharbiyah الغارية الغربية
- Town
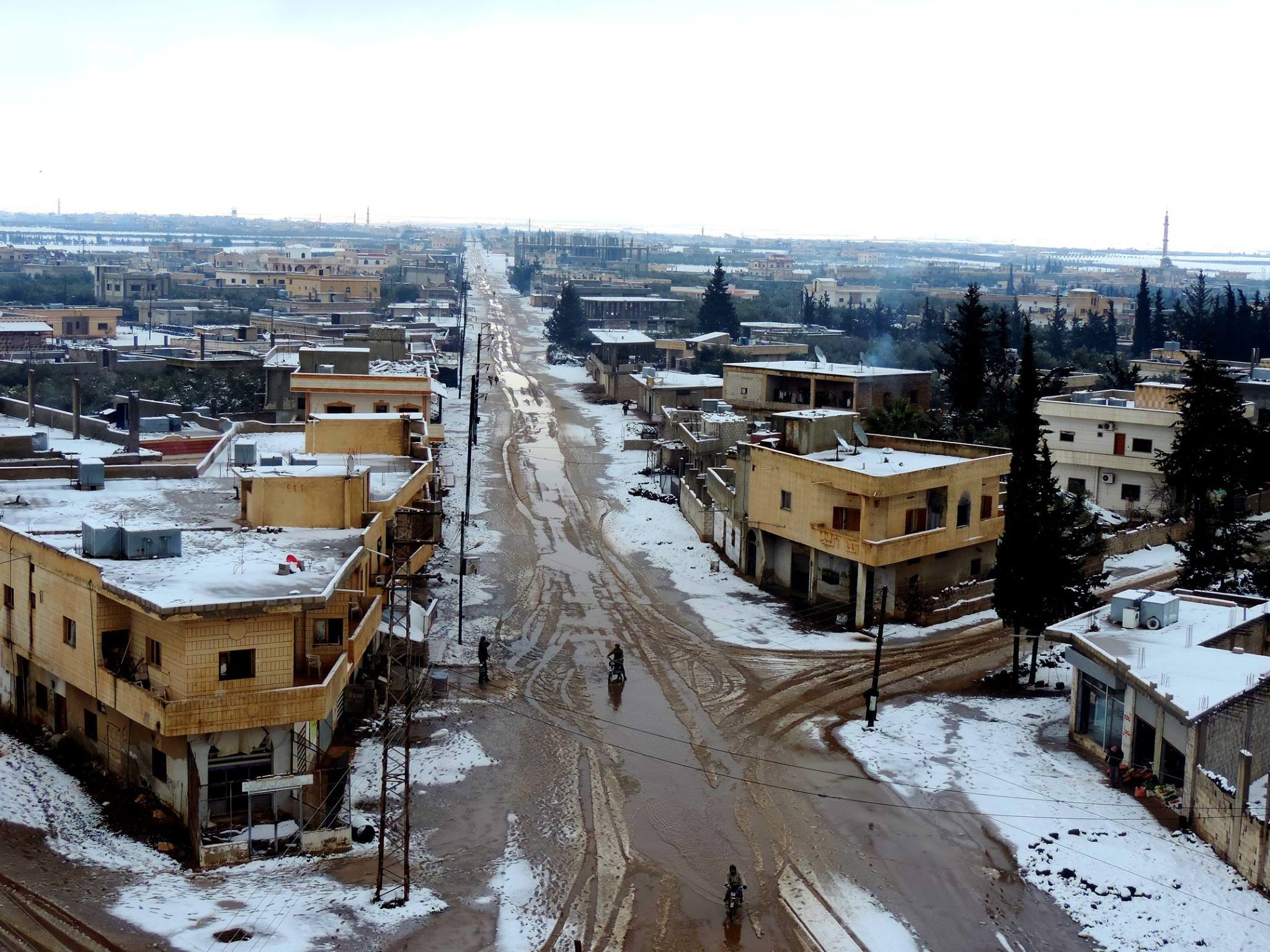
- View of al-Ghariyah al-Gharbiyah, 2015

- Location within Syria
- Coordinates: 32°40′58″N 36°13′24″E
- Grid position: 265/233 PAL
- Country: Syria
- Governorate: Daraa Governorate
- District: Daraa District
- Nahiyah: Khirbet Ghazaleh

Population (2004)
  - Total: 9,784
- Time zone: UTC+3 (AST)

Al-Ghariyah al-Gharbiyah (Arabic: الغارية الغربية, romanized: Al-Gārīyah al-Ghārbīyah) also known as Western Ghariyah is a town in the Daraa District in southern Syria, northeast of Daraa city, on the M5 motorway between Damascus and the Nasib Border Crossing with Jordan. It is a historical town with many Roman-era ruins. The area is surrounded by fertile plains, and a number of its inhabitants depend on the agriculture for income. According to the Syria Central Bureau of Statistics, it had a population of 9,784 in the 2004 census.

The town is well known for the cultivation of olive trees, which cover more than 50% of town's municipal area. The principal families of the town include Al Aalgbit, Al Aweer, Al Moshmosh, Al Zoubi and Al Hariri.

== Geographical location ==
The town is located on the Damascus–Daraa (highway road). It is bounded on the south by the town of Saida, on the north by the city of Khirbet Ghazaleh and on the east by al-Ghariyah al-Sharqiyah. On the western side, their lands adjoin the towns of Ataman and al-Naimeh, close to Daraa city, so the western side of the town has the largest percentage of land owned by the people of the town; these lands are called Mashwar.

== History ==
Al-Ghariyah al-Gharbiyah was the site of a Roman-era town.

In the Ottoman tax registers of 1596, it was a village located the nahiya of Butayna, Qada Hauran, under the name of Gariyya as-Sugra. It had a population of 51 households and 21 bachelors, all Muslims. They paid a fixed tax-rate of 40% on agricultural products, including wheat, barley, summer crops, goats and beehives, in addition to occasional revenues; a total of 15,000 Ottoman silver coins.

In 1838, it was recorded as being deserted, unlike nearby al-Ghariyah al-Sharqiyah ("Eastern Al-Ghariyah"), which was inhabited at the time, and whose inhabitants were predominantly Muslim. Later in the mid-19th century, al-Ghariyah al-Gharbiyah contained several huts.

== Economy ==
Like other towns in the Hauran plain, al-Ghariyah al-Gharbiyah is known for the diversity and density of their crops with the increase in the cultivation of olive. A large number of al-Ghariyah al-Gharbiyah people are expatriates living in many Arab countries, especially the Persian Gulf states.

== Mosques ==
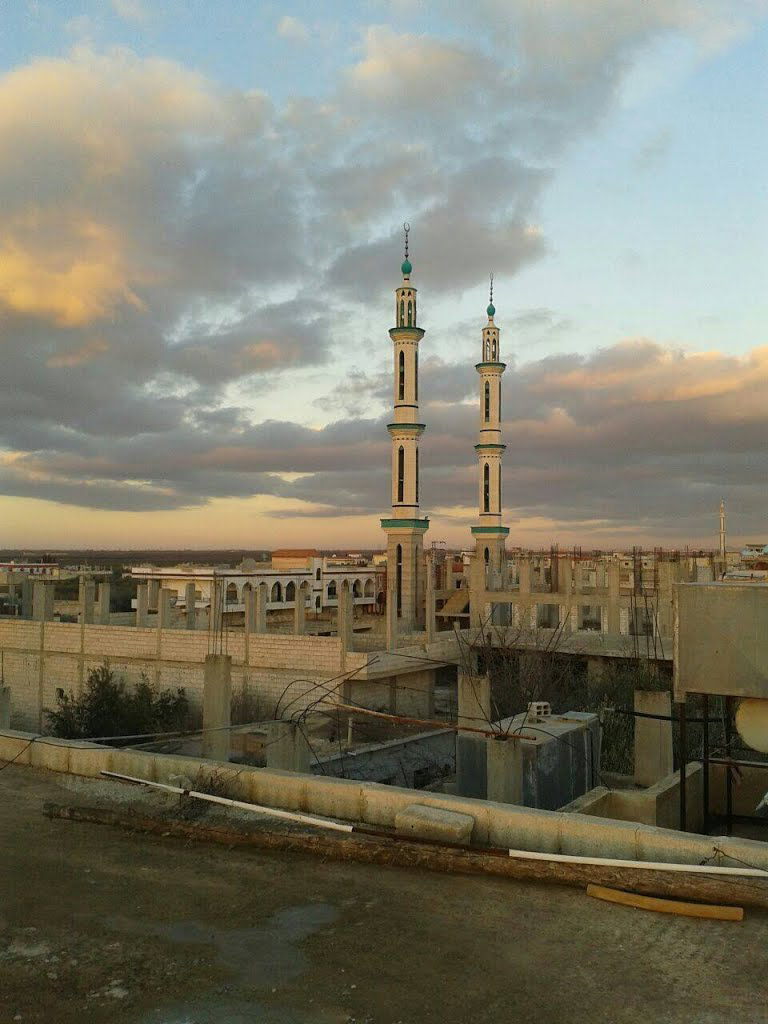
Omar Bin al Khattab Mosque

The entire population is Sunni Muslim. There are six mosques in the town: Great Mosque (East District), Northern Mosque (Omar Bin al Khattab Mosque, under construction, which was halted because of the 2011 Syrian protests), East Mosque, the Western Mosque, Southern Mosque, and a mosque next to Wadi al-Dahab.

== Services ==
The town has basic services such as water, electricity and gas, but does not have many official facilities, only a municipal clinic to treat patients free of charge and give vaccines to children. The town has many medical clinics and pharmacies in which all types of drugs are available cheaply.

== Education ==
Al-Ghariyah al-Gharbiyah has many schools for the area and population, and there is interest from people in terms of science and education. There are secondary schools such as: Shahid Hassan Alfruan secondary - East school and primary schools such as: Sadiq School - Hamdi School - Madrshabdallalh.

== Bibliography ==
- Hütteroth, W.-D.; Abdulfattah, K. (1977). Historical Geography of Palestine, Transjordan and Southern Syria in the Late 16th Century. Erlanger Geographische Arbeiten, Sonderband 5. Erlangen, Germany: Vorstand der Fränkischen Geographischen Gesellschaft. ISBN 3-920405-41-2.
- Robinson, E.; Smith, E. (1841). Biblical Researches in Palestine, Mount Sinai and Arabia Petraea: A Journal of Travels in the year 1838. Vol. 3. Boston: Crocker & Brewster.
- This article was started with material translated from the article in the Arabic language Wikipedia.
