= Al-Musayfirah =

Al-Musayfirah المسيفرة
- Town
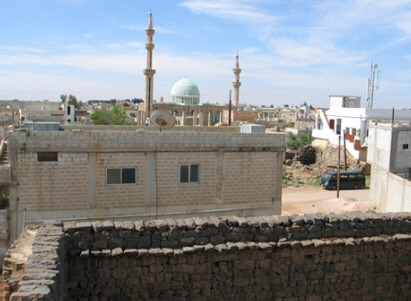
- Al-Musayfirah

- Location within Syria
- Coordinates: 32°37′56″N 36°20′19″E
- Grid position: 276/227 PAL
- Country: Syria
- Governorate: Daraa
- District: Daraa
- Subdistrict: Al-Musayfirah
- Elevation: 550 m (1,800 ft)

Population (2004)
  - Total: 10,466
- Time zone: UTC+3 (AST)

Al-Musayfirah (Arabic: المسيفرة, also spelled Mseifreh or Musayfra) is a town in southern Syria, administratively part of the Daraa Governorate, located east of Daraa and 37 kilometers southeast of Damascus.

Nearby localities include Kahil to the southwest, al-Jiza to the south, al-Sahwah to the southeast, 'Ara to the east, Umm Walad to the northeast, al-Karak to the north, al-Ghariyah al-Sharqiyah to the northwest and Saida to the west. Al-Musayfirah has an area of 705 hectares.

It is the administrative center of the al-Musayfirah nahiyah ("subdistrict") which consisted of four localities with a collective population of 32,473 in 2004. According to the Syria Central Bureau of Statistics, al-Musayfirah itself had a population of 10,466 in the 2004 census. In recent times its population was estimated to be about 13,600 in 2009. Its largest family is the al-Zu'bi (al-Zoubi) clan.

Al-Musayfirah served as the center of the al-Qadiriyyah Sufi order during the Ottoman and French eras. The town is well known for being the site of a major battle between the French Army and Druze rebels during the Great Syrian Revolt in September 1925. Most of its inhabitants had been forced out or killed by French forces before and during that battle.

The town is largely dependent on money sent from expatriate residents working in the Persian Gulf States. Expatriate funds have largely been responsible for the establishment of several public places in the town, namely the Civil Affairs Center, the Finance Division office, the Red Crescent building, the Real Estate Registration office, the Agricultural Bank, the Health School, the Magistrate's Court, the Insurance Office and the Pharmacy. Agriculture is the major domestic income-producing activity, with olives being the principal crop. Wheat, barley and various vegetables are also cultivated. The climate is generally moderate, with mild winters and hot summers. There are five elementary schools, three primary schools, one technical secondary school and a high school in al-Musayfirah, totaling about 3,800 students in 2010. The town's residents have experienced casualties, arrests and displacement throughout the ongoing Syrian civil war.

== History ==
Al-Musayfirah was mentioned in pre-Islamic Syriac texts.

=== Ottoman and French periods ===
The modern town was founded during the Ottoman era (1517–1917). In 1596 Musayfira appeared in the Ottoman tax registers as being part of the nahiya (subdistrict) of Butayna in the Qada Hauran. It had an entirely Muslim population consisting of 22 households and 18 bachelors. They paid a fixed tax-rate of 40% on agricultural products, including wheat, barley, summer crops, goats and/or beehives; a total of 6,300 akçe.

In 1838, during late Ottoman rule, al-Musayfirah was found to be located south of al-Shaykh Maskin, and was classified as a khirba (abandoned village) by biblical scholar Eli Smith. Throughout this era and during French rule (1918–46), 16 villages in the region were controlled by the al-Zu'bi clan which also provided many of the religious sheikhs of the Sufi order, Qadiriyyah, founded by Abd al-Qadir al-Jilani. While Khirbet al-Ghazaleh and Deir al-Bukht served as the clan's chief political seats, al-Musayfirah served as the religious center of the al-Zu'bi. In September 1910 al-Musayfirah served as a destination of Ottoman troops before launching a punitive expedition against Druze rebels in Jabal Hauran, just to the east. The leader of the rebels, Yahya al-Atrash, was arrested by the authorities during the operation.

During the Great Syrian Revolt against the French Mandate, the Muslim sheikh (chieftain) of al-Musayfirah, Muhammad al-Zu'bi, and his horsemen joined the Druze rebels of Sultan Pasha al-Atrash in the Jabal in August 1925. Al-Musayfirah was the site of a major battle between French forces and Druze rebels on 17 September. The battle ended in a French victory and rebel fatalities between 300 and 400. It consequently paved the way for the French capture of al-Suwayda on 24 September, although they withdrew from the city two months after. Several of al-Musayfirah's inhabitants had been either killed or expelled before and during the battle. A monument was later erected in al-Musayfirah to honor the rebels' efforts during the battle.

=== Civil war ===
On 29 July 2011, during the ongoing Syrian civil war which began in March 2011, an anti-government demonstration in al-Musayfirah was dispersed by security forces who opened fire on protesters, killing a civilian. In early September hundreds to thousands of protesters participated in anti-government demonstrations in the town. On 11 September, Reuters reported that 40 people from al-Musayfirah were forcibly detained by security forces, among dozens of others from nearby towns, namely al-Jiza and Busra al-Harir. On 27 April 2012, the Financial Times reporter Michael Peele reported that during the brief ceasefire between government forces and rebels, he witnessed "hundreds-strong rally chanting "God bless the Free Syrian Army" in al-Musayfirah. The Free Syrian Army is one of the principal armed umbrella-organizations revolting against the government of Bashar al-Assad. At the time, some residents claimed that one-third of the town's population of 15,000 had fled and dozens had been killed since the start of the war.

== Bibliography ==
- Batatu, H. (1999). Syria's peasantry, the descendants of its lesser rural notables, and their politics (Illustrated ed.). Princeton University Press. ISBN 0691002541.
- Betts, Robert Brenton (2010). The Druze. Yale University Press. ISBN 978-0300048100.
- Honigman, E. (1995). "Al-Nukra". The Encyclopedia of Islam, New Edition, Volume VIII: Ned–Sam. Leiden and New York: BRILL. p. 114. ISBN 90-04-09834-8.
- Hütteroth, W.-D.; Abdulfattah, K. (1977). Historical Geography of Palestine, Transjordan and Southern Syria in the Late 16th Century. Erlanger Geographische Arbeiten, Sonderband 5. Erlangen, Germany: Vorstand der Fränkischen Geographischen Gesellschaft. ISBN 3-920405-41-2.
- Murphy, C. C. R. (1921). Soldiers of the Prophet. John Hogg.
- Provence, Michael (2005). The Great Syrian Revolt and the Rise of Arab Nationalism. University of Texas Press. ISBN 9780292706804.
- Robinson, E.; Smith, E. (1841). Biblical Researches in Palestine, Mount Sinai and Arabia Petraea: A Journal of Travels in the year 1838. Vol. 3. Boston: Crocker & Brewster.
