= Al-Sahwah =

Al-Sahwah السهوة
- Village
- Location within Syria
- Coordinates: 32°35′46″N 36°22′4″E
- Grid position: 278/222
- Country: Syria
- Governorate: Daraa
- District: Daraa
- Subdistrict: Al-Musayfirah

Population (2004)
  - Total: 3,950
- Time zone: UTC+3 (AST)

Al-Sahwah (Arabic: السهوة, also spelled el-Sahoa or Sahweh); also known as Sahwat al-Qamh or Sehwet el-Kamh is a village in southern Syria, administratively part of the Daraa Governorate, located east of Daraa. Nearby localities include al-Jiza to the southwest, Ghasm to the south, Maaraba, Daraa to the southeast, Umm Walad to the northeast, al-Musayfirah to the north and Kahil to the west. According to the Syria Central Bureau of Statistics, al-Sahwah had a population of 3,950 in the 2004 census, making it the least populous locality in the al-Musayfirah nahiyah ("subdistrict").

== History ==
In 1596 al-Sahwah appeared in the Ottoman tax registers under the name of Sahwat al-Qamh, as being part of the nahiya (subdistrict) of Butayna in the Qada Hauran. It had a Muslim population consisting of 9 households and 4 bachelors. They paid a fixed tax-rate of 40% on agricultural products, including wheat, barley, summer crops, goats and/or beehives; a total of 3,300 akçe.

There are ruins of an ancient tower and a church in al-Sahwah. Although the buildings are of some significance, they do not differ much from the ancient Roman and Byzantine architecture found throughout the Hauran. The village did not have any Christian residents in the 19th century.

In 1838 the village was classified as a khirba (abandoned village) by English biblical scholar Eli Smith. In the late 19th-century al-Sahwah had a population of about 350 people living in about 70 households. The village was vulnerable to incursions by Druze raiders, and also had a shortage of water sources. The villagers had to pay a certain sum to the Druze sheikhs (chiefs), in order to connect to a water-canal south of the village and fill the village reservoir. If, in the event of a bad harvest, they could not pay this sum, the village would face mass hunger and cattle had to be taken to Bosra for water.

== Bibliography ==
- Hütteroth, W.-D.; Abdulfattah, K. (1977). Historical Geography of Palestine, Transjordan and Southern Syria in the Late 16th Century. Erlanger Geographische Arbeiten, Sonderband 5. Erlangen, Germany: Vorstand der Fränkischen Geographischen Gesellschaft. ISBN 3-920405-41-2.
- Robinson, E.; Smith, E. (1841). Biblical Researches in Palestine, Mount Sinai and Arabia Petraea: A Journal of Travels in the year 1838. Vol. 3. Boston: Crocker & Brewster.
- Schumacher, G. (1897). "Der Südliche Basan". Zeitschrift des Deutschen Palästina-Vereins. 19–20: 65–227.
