= Al-Mataaiya =

Al-Mataaiyah المتاعية
- Village
- Location within Syria
- Coordinates: 32°29′46″N 36°17′34″E
- Country: Syria
- Governorate: Daraa Governorate
- District: Daraa District
- Nahiyah: Al-Jiza

Population (2004 census)
  - Total: 2,734
- Time zone: UTC+3 (AST)

Al-Mataaiyah, also spelled al-Muta'iya or Mataeiyeh (Arabic: المتاعية), is a village in southern Syria, administratively part of the Daraa Governorate, located southeast of Daraa and west of Bosra. Nearby localities include Nasib to the east, al-Taybeh to the northwest, al-Jiza to the north, Ghasm to the northeast, and the Jordanian village of Sama al-Sirhan to the southwest. According to the Syria Central Bureau of Statistics (CBS), al-Mataaiyah had a population of 2,734 in the 2004 census.

== History ==
Al-Mataaiyah was a khirba (ruined village) by the 19th century during Ottoman rule. However, the second half of that century saw a resurgence in grain cultivation and security in the Hauran region, of which al-Mataaiyah was part. In 1892, a certain entrepreneurial local chieftain, Sheikh Khuntush, purchased the then-abandoned village for 1,000 Turkish gold liras. Afterward, he moved farmers into al-Mataaiyah and built cisterns inside the dry village to collect rainwater. In 1895, there were about 150 inhabitants and Sheikh Khuntush resolved to bring in more peasants. By 1905, the population grew to 200. During the 1890s, some people from al-Mataaiyah also reestablished the then-khirba of Sama, 7 kilometers to the southwest.
