= Ghasm =

Ghasm غصم
- Village
- Location within Syria
- Coordinates: 32°32′44″N 36°22′33″E
- Grid position: 279/217
- Country: Syria
- Governorate: Daraa
- District: Daraa
- Subdistrict: Al-Jiza
- Elevation: 531 m (1,742 ft)

Population (2004 census)
  - Total: 3,666
- Time zone: UTC+3 (AST)

Ghasm (Arabic: غصم, also spelled Ghasam) is a village in southwest Syria, administratively part of the Daraa Governorate, located northeast of Daraa and west of Bosra. Other nearby localities include Maaraba to the east, al-Sahwah to the north, al-Jiza to west and al-Mataaiya to the south. According to the Syria Central Bureau of Statistics (CBS), Ghasm had a population of 3,666 in the 2004 census.

== History ==
A Roman road, still in use in the late 19th century, leads to Ghasm. The village contains a ruined Byzantine-era church. It was dedicated to the honor of Saints Sergius and Bacchus in 593 CE.

=== Ottoman era ===
Ghasm's inhabitants were originally settled Bedouin. The Sunni Muslim al-Miqdad clan has been the predominant family in Ghasm and a number of nearby towns since the Ottoman Empire era.

In 1596 Ghasm appeared in the Ottoman tax registers as Gasim and was part of the nahiya of Butayna in the Hauran Sanjak. It had an entirely Muslim population consisting of 25 households and 12 bachelors. The villagers paid a fixed tax rate of 40% on various agricultural products, including wheat, barley, summer crops, goats and/or beehives, and a water-mill; a total of 6,500 akçe.

In 1838, Ghusam was noted as a ruin, situated "In the Nukrah, west of Busrah".

In 1895 travellers passing through the village were told of how the Druze had raided the village in 1893. The region of Hauran had become plagued by the Druze-Muslim conflict. The villagers had to rely on the Druze for the water-course to be led by the village, and in 1894 they had paid the Druze 200 medjidies. Late 19th century, the village had 106 houses and a population of 450, including six Christian families.

== Notable people ==
- Faisal Mekdad

== Bibliography ==
- Batatu, H. (1999). Syria's Peasantry, the Descendants of Its Lesser Rural Notables, and Their Politics. Princeton University Press. ISBN 0691002541.
- Hütteroth, W.-D.; Abdulfattah, K. (1977). Historical Geography of Palestine, Transjordan and Southern Syria in the Late 16th Century. Erlanger Geographische Arbeiten, Sonderband 5. Erlangen, Germany: Vorstand der Fränkischen Geographischen Gesellschaft. ISBN 3-920405-41-2.
- Morison, T; et al. (1911). The life of Sir Edward FitzGerald Law, K.C.S.I., K.C.M.G. Edinburgh, London: W. Blackwood and sons.
- Robinson, E.; Smith, E. (1841). Biblical Researches in Palestine, Mount Sinai and Arabia Petraea: A Journal of Travels in the year 1838. Vol. 3. Boston: Crocker & Brewster.
- Schumacher, G. (1897). "Der Südliche Basan". Zeitschrift des Deutschen Palästina-Vereins. 19–20: 65–227.
