= Maaraba, Daraa =

Maaraba معربة Maʿrabah Moraba
- Village
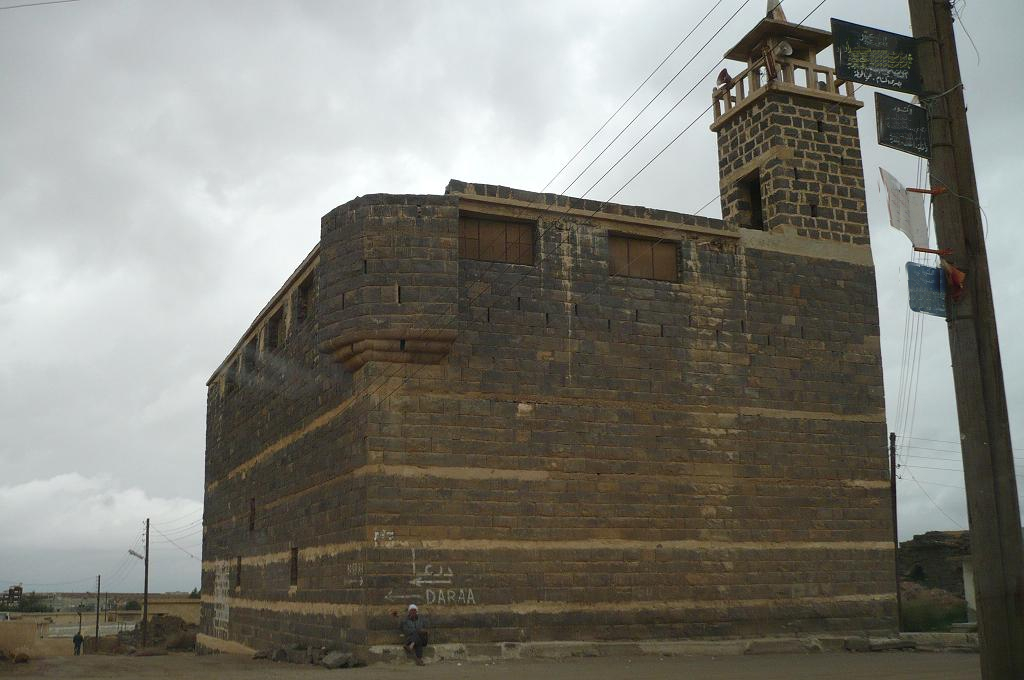
- Old mosque of Maaraba, 2009

- Location within Syria
- Coordinates: 32°32′45″N 36°25′42″E
- Grid position: 284/217
- Country: Syria
- Governorate: Daraa
- District: Daraa
- Subdistrict: Bosra

Population (2004)
  - Total: 8,988
- Time zone: UTC+3 (AST)

Maaraba (Arabic: معربة, romanized: Maʿraba) or Moraba is a village in southern Syria, administratively part of the Daraa Governorate, located east of Daraa. Nearby localities include Bosra to the east, Umm Walad to the north and Ghasm to the west. According to the Syria Central Bureau of Statistics, Maaraba had a population of 8,988 in the 2004 census.

== History ==
In 1596 the village appeared in the Ottoman tax registers named Ma'raba, part of the nahiya (Subdistrict) of Bani Nasiyya in the Hauran Sanjak. It had an entirely Muslim population consisting of 29 households and 18 bachelors. They paid a fixed tax-rate of 40% on agricultural products, including wheat, barley, summer crops, goats and beehives, and a water mill; a total of 13,000 akçe.

== Religious buildings ==
- Our Lady’s Nativity Greek Orthodox Church

== See also ==
- Christians in Syria

== Bibliography ==
- Hütteroth, W.-D.; Abdulfattah, K. (1977). Historical Geography of Palestine, Transjordan and Southern Syria in the Late 16th Century. Erlanger Geographische Arbeiten, Sonderband 5. Erlangen, Germany: Vorstand der Fränkischen Geographischen Gesellschaft. ISBN 3-920405-41-2.
