= Beit Ara =

Beit Ara بيت أرة Beit Irah, Beit Arrah
- Village
- Location within Syria
- Coordinates: 32°46′46″N 35°49′27″E
- Grid position: 229/240 PAL
- Country: Syria
- Governorate: Daraa
- District: Daraa
- Subdistrict: Shajara

Population (2004 census)
  - Total: 1,878
- Time zone: UTC+3 (AST)

Beit Ara (Arabic: بيت أرة, also transliterated Beit Irah or Beit Arra) is a village in southern Syria, administratively part of the Daraa Governorate, located west of Daraa. According to the Syria Central Bureau of Statistics, Beit Ara had a population of 1,878 in the 2004 census. It is situated 5 kilometers (3.1 mi) north of the Yarmuk River (border of Syria and Jordan) and 22 kilometers (14 mi) south of Tafas.

== History ==
=== Ottoman period ===
In 1596 the village was listed under the name of Bayt Irr in the Ottoman tax registers, as part of the nahiya (subdistrict) of Jawlan Sharqi in the Qada of Hauran. It had an all Muslim population consisting of 39 households and 25 bachelors. They paid taxes on various agricultural products, including wheat (2,250 akçe), barley (900 a.), summer crops (550 a.), goats and/or beehives (150), in addition to occasional revenues (150 a.); a total of 4,000 akçe.

The German explorer Ulrich Jasper Seetzen passed through the region in 1808–1809 and found ruins in the Hauran at a site called 'Bethirra', which German geographer Carl Ritter suggested was the 'Bethura' fortress constructed by Herod the Great when he ruled Batanea (ancient Hauran) (c. 37–4 BCE. The fortress town later served as a garrison at one point during Byzantine rule (4th–early 7th centuries CE). While Seetzen placed Bethirra southeast of the village of Tasil, American archaeologist Gottlieb Schumacher noted this was an error and identified the site with Beit Ara (southwest of Tasil).

In the 1880s, Beit Ara was described by Schumacher as "a small village on the upper part of the western slopes" of Wadi al-Zayyatin. It had a population of 90 Muslims living in twenty-five houses built of stone and mud. Its immediate vicinity was characterized by extensive ruins of ancient dwellings and some fertile lands.

== Bibliography ==
- Hütteroth, W.-D.; Abdulfattah, K. (1977). Historical Geography of Palestine, Transjordan and Southern Syria in the Late 16th Century. Erlanger Geographische Arbeiten, Sonderband 5. Erlangen, Germany: Vorstand der Fränkischen Geographischen Gesellschaft. ISBN 3-920405-41-2.
- Schumacher, G. (1886). Across the Jordan: Being an Exploration and Survey of part of Hauran and Jaulan. London: Richard Bentley and Son.
- Ma'oz, Zvi Uri (2008). The Ghassānids and the Fall of the Golan Synagogues. Archaostyle.
