= Tisiyah =

Tisiyah طيسيا
- Village
- Location in Syria
- Coordinates: 32.4143921°N 36.4540203°E,
- PAL: 287/202
- Country: Syria
- Governorate: Daraa
- District: Daraa
- Subdistrict: Bosra
- Elevation: 810 m (2,660 ft)

Population (2004 census)
  - Total: 26
- Time zone: UTC+3 (AST)

Tisiyah or Tisiya (طيسيا) is a village in southern Syria, administratively belonging to the Daraa Governorate, in the Hauran. According to the Syria Central Bureau of Statistics (CBS) Tisiyah had a population of 26 in the 2004 census.

== History ==
The village was founded by local Haurani Arab Christians after being expelled by the Druze from the nearby mountains. In 1933 the village was attacked by the Druze.

== Demographics ==
The inhabitants of the village are predominantly Christian Arabs of the Greek Orthodox Church of Antioch. The main families of the village are the Dahdal, Al-Eid, Al-Hanat, Al-Awabdeh, Al-Hana, Al-Jawabrh and Ouais. Most of the villagers emigrated during the 20th century and their descendants live mainly in Damascus, Daraa and Aleppo in Syria, and in Amman in Jordan. In 2010 the population of the village was around 500 people.

== Buildings ==
Near the village center there are remains of a small ancient church built with irregular stones. The local church is dedicated to Saint George and includes various mosaics.

== See also ==
- Christianity in Syria
