= Al-Jiza =

Al-Jiza or Al-Jizah may refer to:

- Giza, third largest city in Egypt and capital of the Giza Governorate
- Giza Governorate, administrative division of Egypt
- Al-Jizah, Jordan, a town in Jordan
- Al-Jiza, Syria, a village in Syria
