= Da'el =

Town in Syria

Da'el داعل
- Town
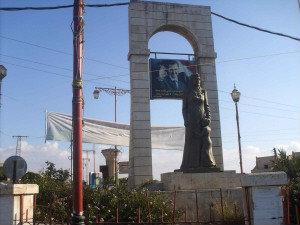
- Town Square of Da'el

- Location in Syria
- Coordinates: 32°45′14″N 36°07′48″E
- Grid position: 255/240
- Country: Syria
- Governorate: Daraa
- District: Daraa
- Subdistrict: Da'el
- Control: Syrian Opposition
- Elevation: 600 m (2,000 ft)

Population (2004 census)
  - Total: 29,408
- Time zone: UTC+3 (AST)

Da'el (Arabic: داعل, also spelled Da'il) is a town in southern Syria located on the old road between Daraa and Damascus, located approximately 14 kilometers north of Daraa. Administratively, it belongs to the Daraa District of the Daraa Governorate and is the center of the Da'el nahiyah ("subdistrict") which also includes one other town, Abtaa, to the immediate north. Other nearby localities include Tafas to the west, Ataman to the south, Khirbet al-Ghazaleh to the east, Namir and Qarfa to the northeast, al-Shaykh Maskin to the north and al-Shaykh Saad to the northwest.

As of the 2004 census by the Central Bureau of Statistics (CBS), the population of Da'el town was 29,408, while the Da'el subdistrict was 43,691. Its inhabitants are predominantly Sunni Muslim. The inhabitants are mainly involved in agriculture of grains (wheat, beans, olives, grapes, etc.) and expertise manpower in some Persian Gulf countries (UAE, KSA, Kuwait and Qatar).

The city was recently modernized with a new wave of services such as high-speed internet, full cell-phone coverage, new land line phones with a boom in construction field. Government employees do not exceed 5% of the town's population while the rest operate their own businesses.

== History ==
=== Antiquity ===
Two inscriptions in ancient Greek are known from Da'el, then part of the Roman Hauran, although neither has a documented recovery location. One, found on a lintel, records the establishment of a cultic centre dedicated to the deity Akeiras in 274/275 AD. Another commemorates the commissioning of a pavement and columns by individuals named Azizos and Zabdas, probably for the same sanctuary.

=== Ottoman period ===
In 1596 Da'el appeared in the Ottoman tax registers as Da'il and was part of the nahiya of Bani Malik al-Asraf in the Qada Hawran. It had an entirely Muslim population consisting of 42 households and 20 bachelors. They paid a fixed tax-rate of 40% on agricultural products, including on wheat, barley, summer crops, goats and/or beehives, in addition to on a water mill; a total of 16,000 akçe.

In 1838 Da'el was classified as a Muslim village, located south of al-Shaykh Maskin. At the end of the 19th century, the village had 300 inhabitants and 65 houses. Throughout the later Ottoman era and up until the dominance of the Ba'ath Party during the 1960s, the al-Hariri clan, which had its principal seat in Da'el, was the most powerful clan in the Hauran region of southern Syria, controlling about 18 villages. The al-Hariri family had also been the chief patrons of the Rifa'i order of Sufi mystics in the Hauran. The Rifa'i were the most prominent Sufi order in the area.

=== Modern period ===
During the French occupation (1918–1946), the al-Hariri clan entered into a rivalry with the Zu'bi clan which was based in nearby Khirbet al-Ghazaleh and controlled 16 villages. The al-Hariri were largely aligned with nationalist movement, while the Zu'bi leadership was identified with the French Mandatory authorities.

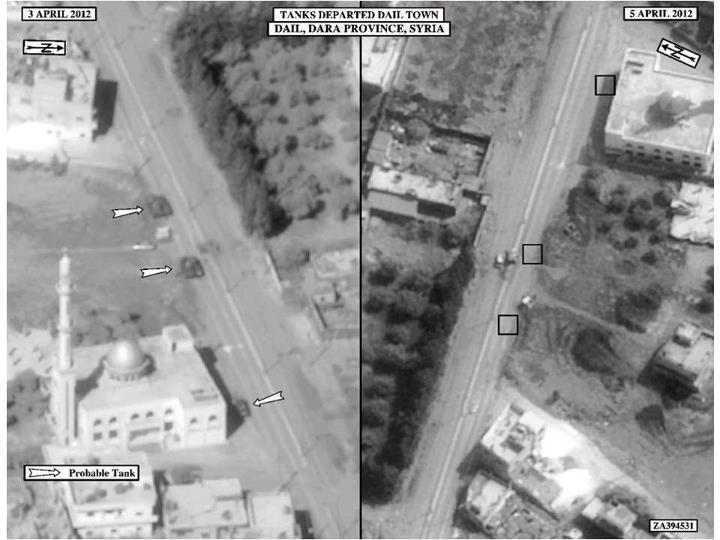
April, 2012; satellite pictures showing Syrian tanks leaving Da'el

While the al-Hariri naturally benefited from Syrian independence and also received backing from Saudi Arabia, the Zu'bi managed to gain more influence during Baathist governance, but more so on the individual and lower-stratum level rather than as a tribal unit. The influence of both the tribes and their leaders considerably dwindled during the Baathist era, nonetheless.

=== Civil war ===
In March 2011 Da'el was among the first towns in the area of Daraa where residents participated in demonstrations against the government of Bashar al-Assad, which would eventually culminate into the ongoing Syrian civil war. On 29 March 2013 the town was reportedly captured by anti-government rebels. Da'el is strategically located on one of two main north-south highways that connect Damascus to Daraa. The rebels initially engaged in clashes with Syrian Army troops manning checkpoints outside the town, leaving 12 government soldiers and 16 rebels, according to the activist group Syrian Observatory for Human Rights (SOHR).

== Bibliography ==
- Batatu, H. (1999). Syria's peasantry, the descendants of its lesser rural notables, and their politics (Illustrated ed.). Princeton University Press. ISBN 0691002541.
- Hütteroth, W.-D.; Abdulfattah, K. (1977). Historical Geography of Palestine, Transjordan and Southern Syria in the Late 16th Century. Erlanger Geographische Arbeiten, Sonderband 5. Erlangen, Germany: Vorstand der Fränkischen Geographischen Gesellschaft. ISBN 3-920405-41-2.
- Mazzilli, Francesca (2018). Rural Cult Centres in the Hauran: Part of the broader network of the Near East (100 BC–AD 300). Archaeopress. pp. 164–165. doi:10.2307/j.ctvndv916. ISBN 978-1-78491-954-2.
- Schumacher, G. (1897). "Der Südliche Basan". Zeitschrift des Deutschen Palästina-Vereins. 19–20: 65–227.
- Robinson, E.; Smith, E. (1841). Biblical Researches in Palestine, Mount Sinai and Arabia Petraea: A Journal of Travels in the year 1838. Vol. 3. Boston: Crocker & Brewster.
