= Saida, Syria =

Saida صَيْدَا
- Village
- Location within Syria
- Coordinates: 32°37′42″N 36°13′34″E
- Grid position: 265/226 PAL
- Country: Syria
- Governorate: Daraa
- District: Daraa
- Subdistrict: Daraa

Population (2004 census)
  - Total: 11,215
- Time zone: UTC+3 (AST)

Saida, also spelled Seida or Sayda (Arabic: صَيْدَا, romanized: Ṣaydā or Seida), is a village in southern Syria, administratively part of the Daraa Governorate, located east of Daraa. Nearby localities include al-Naimah to the west, Al-Ghariyah al-Gharbiyah to the north, Kahil and al-Musayfirah to the east and al-Taybah and Umm al-Mayazen to the south. According to the Syria Central Bureau of Statistics (CBS), Saida had a population of 11,215 in the 2004 census.

== History ==
In the Ottoman tax registers of 1596, Sayda was a village located the nahiya of Butayna, Qada of Hauran. It had a population of 41 households and 13 bachelors, all Muslims. They paid a fixed tax-rate of 40% on agricultural products, including wheat, barley, summer crops, goats and beehives, in addition to occasional revenues; a total of 8,188 akçe. 1/6 of the revenue went to a waqf. In 1838 Eli Smith noted that the place was located west of the Hajj road, and that it was in ruins.

Saida was also noted as a khirba (ruined village) by 1858 during Ottoman rule. However, the second half of that century saw a resurgence in grain cultivation and security in the Hauran region, of which Saida was part. During that period, it was settled and by 1895 had 250 inhabitants.

== Bibliography ==
- Hütteroth, W.-D.; Abdulfattah, K. (1977). Historical Geography of Palestine, Transjordan and Southern Syria in the Late 16th Century. Erlanger Geographische Arbeiten, Sonderband 5. Erlangen, Germany: Vorstand der Fränkischen Geographischen Gesellschaft. ISBN 3-920405-41-2.
- Robinson, E.; Smith, E. (1841). Biblical Researches in Palestine, Mount Sinai and Arabia Petraea: A Journal of Travels in the year 1838. Vol. 3. Boston: Crocker & Brewster.
