= Umm Walad =

Umm Walad أم ولد
- Town
- Location within Syria
- Coordinates: 32°39′28″N 36°25′55″E
- PAL: 284/229
- Country: Syria
- Governorate: Daraa Governorate
- District: Daraa District
- Nahiyah: al-Musayfirah

Population (2004 census)
  - Total: 7,547
- Time zone: UTC+3 (AST)

Umm Walad (Arabic: أم ولد, also spelled Om Walad) is a town in southern Syria, administratively part of the Daraa Governorate, located east of Daraa in the Hauran region. Nearby localities include Ira to the southeast, Jabab to the south, al-Musayfirah to the southwest, al-Karak to the northwest, al-Thaalah to the north and al-Suwayda to the northeast. According to the Syria Central Bureau of Statistics (CBS), Umm Walad had a population of 7,547 in the 2004 census. Its inhabitants are predominantly Sunni Muslim Bedouins.

== History ==
In 1838, Um Wulad was noted as a Muslim village, situated "the Nukra, east of Al-Shaykh Maskin".

Sometime between 1862 and 1867, Druze migrants from Mount Lebanon settled in Umm Walad. However, by 1883 there was no longer a Druze presence. On 26 January 1881, as part of a Druze rebellion against Ottoman authorities, Umm Walad was attacked by Druze fighters. The attacks on Umm Walad and the massacre of Muslims at nearby al-Karak sparked popular anger among the Muslims of Hauran and the al-Midan neighborhood of Damascus, which was involved in the conflict. The Ottoman authorities in Damascus were ordered by the government in Istanbul to peacefully resolve the situation. As a result, an Ottoman commission reached an agreement with the Druze that stipulated the abandonment of arrest warrants against wanted Druze individuals, the collective Druze payment of blood money to the Muslim victims of Hauran, and a warning to the Muslims of the area to refrain from provoking the Druze.

In August 1925, following the French defeat at the Battle of al-Mazraa, part of the Great Syrian Revolt against French Mandate rule, negotiations between the Druze and the French Mandate authorities took place at Umm Walad. At the conclusion of the talks, an exchange of prisoners also took place in the village amid Druze celebrations.

On 29 June 2018, the Syrian army occupied the town.

== Bibliography ==
- Firro, Kais (1992). A History of the Druzes. Vol. 1. BRILL. ISBN 9004094377.
- Provence, Michael (2005). The Great Syrian Revolt and the Rise of Arab Nationalism. University of Texas Press. ISBN 9780292706804.
- Robinson, E.; Smith, E. (1841). Biblical Researches in Palestine, Mount Sinai and Arabia Petraea: A Journal of Travels in the year 1838. Vol. 3. Boston: Crocker & Brewster.
