= Ataman, Syria =

Ataman عتمان Athman Othman
- Village
- Location within Syria
- Coordinates: 32°39′44″N 36°6′53″E
- Grid position: 254/230 PAL
- Country: Syria
- Governorate: Daraa
- District: Daraa
- Subdistrict: Daraa

Population (2004)
  - Total: 8,929
- Time zone: UTC+3 (AST)

′Ataman (Arabic: عتمان), also spelled ′Atman, Athman, Osmane or Othman, is a village in southern Syria, administratively part of the Daraa Governorate, located 4 kilometers north of Daraa. Other nearby localities include al-Yadudah to the west, Tafas to the northwest, Da'el to the north, Khirbet Ghazaleh to the northeast, al-Ghariyah al-Gharbiyah to the east and al-Naimah to the southeast. According to the Syria Central Bureau of Statistics, Ataman had a population of 8,929 in the 2004 census.

== History ==
In the Ottoman tax registers of 1596, it was a village located the nahiya of Butayna, Qada of Hawran, under the name of Atman. It had a population of 29 households and 15 bachelors, all Muslims. They paid a fixed tax-rate of 40% on agricultural products, including wheat, barley, summer crops, goats and beehives; a total of 8,000 akçe.

In 1838, during Ottoman rule, Ataman was listed as a khirba (ruined or deserted village) in the Nukrah region by scholar Eli Smith.

== Archaeology ==
Ataman contains a few ancient ruins that were occupied by residents in the early 20th century. According to orientalists Enno Littmann and Howard Crosby Butler, Ataman was likely not an ancient town, but rather "a group of fine residences, or villas, with a common monumental tomb". Among the more notable ruins are an ancient bridge and a large mausoleum. The mausoleum consists of a large stone building topped by a square structure built in the Corinthian architectural form. The mausoleum is the most preserved of Ataman's ancient remains. Just north of the building are ruined structures consisting of parts of ancient columns, large windows and doorways.

== Bibliography ==
- Boulanger, Robert (1966). The Middle East, Lebanon, Syria, Jordan, Iraq, Iran. Hachette.
- Hütteroth, W.-D.; Abdulfattah, K. (1977). Historical Geography of Palestine, Transjordan and Southern Syria in the Late 16th Century. Erlanger Geographische Arbeiten, Sonderband 5. Erlangen, Germany: Vorstand der Fränkischen Geographischen Gesellschaft. ISBN 3-920405-41-2.
- Robinson, E.; Smith, E. (1841). Biblical Researches in Palestine, Mount Sinai and Arabia Petraea: A Journal of Travels in the year 1838. Vol. 3. Boston: Crocker & Brewster.
