= Al-Naimah =

Al-Naimah النعيمة
- Village
- Location within Syria
- Coordinates: 32°38′2″N 36°9′26″E
- Grid position: 259/227 PAL
- Country: Syria
- Governorate: Daraa
- District: Daraa
- Subdistrict: Daraa

Population (2004)
  - Total: 7,472
- Time zone: UTC+3 (AST)

Al-Naimah (Arabic: النعيمة), also al-Naima, al-Naimeh or Elnaymah, is a village in southern Syria, administratively part of the Daraa Governorate, located east of Daraa. Nearby localities include Ataman to the northwest and Saida to the east.

== History ==
In the Ottoman tax registers of 1596, it was a village located the nahiya of Butayna, Qada of Hauran, under the name of Nu'ayma. It had a population of 35 households and 12 bachelors, all Muslims. They paid a fixed tax-rate of 40% on agricultural products, including wheat, barley, summer crops, goats and beehives, in addition to occasional revenues; a total of 15,600 akçe. By the beginning of the 19th century, the village had been abandoned, and in 1838 Eli Smith noted that the place was located west of the Hajj road, and that it was in ruins.

In the 1850s, the village was reestablished by the townspeople of Daraa during a resurgence in grain cultivation to meet growing demand in the Damascene and European markets.

According to the Syria Central Bureau of Statistics, al-Naimah had a population of 7,472 in the 2004 census.

== Bibliography ==
- Hütteroth, W.-D.; Abdulfattah, K. (1977). Historical Geography of Palestine, Transjordan and Southern Syria in the Late 16th Century. Erlanger Geographische Arbeiten, Sonderband 5. Erlangen, Germany: Vorstand der Fränkischen Geographischen Gesellschaft. ISBN 3-920405-41-2.
- Lewis, Norman (2000). "The Syrian Steppe during the Last Century of Ottoman Rule: Hawran and the Palmyrena". In Mundy, Martha; Musallam, Basim (eds.). The Transformation of Nomadic Society in the Arab East. Cambridge: Cambridge University Press. p. 39. ISBN 0521770572.
- Robinson, E.; Smith, E. (1841). Biblical Researches in Palestine, Mount Sinai and Arabia Petraea: A Journal of Travels in the year 1838. Vol. 3. Boston: Crocker & Brewster.
- Wetzstein, J.G. (1860). Reisebericht über Hauran und die Trachonen nebst einem Anhange über die sabaïschen Denkmäler in (in German). Berlin: Dietrich Reimer.
