= Cradle of the Revolution =

Location where a historic political revolution first began

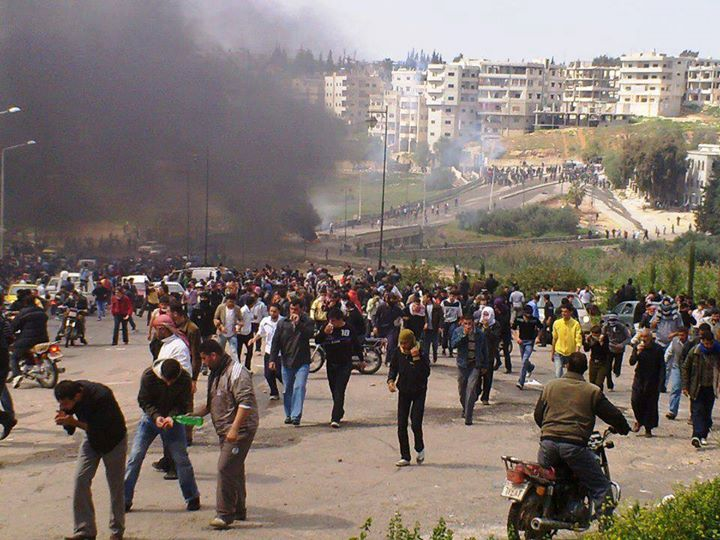
Daraa was the cradle of the Syrian revolution

The term Cradle of the Revolution refers to a historically significant location (typically a city or town or an area within one) where a political revolution began. Such cities often bear outsized importance in the national and/or historical narrative of a country, and may be home to a number of national museums and monuments.

The term derives from infant cradles, referring to a revolution being gradually "nursed" from a young age (e.g. small uprising) until it becomes mature (e.g. full-scale revolt and/or civil war).

== Examples ==
- Bastille, Paris, France - Cradle of the French Revolution (see Storming of the Bastille)
- Boston, Massachusetts and Philadelphia, Pennsylvania - Cradles of the American Revolution (see Faneuil Hall, AKA the "Cradle of Liberty")
- Daraa, Syria - Cradle of the Syrian revolution
- Petrograd, Russian Empire - Cradle of the Russian Revolution
- Sidi Bouzid, Tunisia - Cradle of the Tunisian revolution
- Timișoara, Romania - Cradle of the Romanian revolution
