= Al-Ghariyah ash-Sharqiyah =

Al-Ghariyah ash-Sharqiyah الغارية الشرقية
- Town
- Location within Syria
- Coordinates: 32°40′42″N 36°15′29″E
- PAL: 232/268
- Country: Syria
- Governorate: Daraa Governorate
- District: Daraa District
- Nahiyah: Khirbet Ghazaleh

Population (2004)
  - Total: 11,945
- Time zone: UTC+3 (AST)

Al-Ghariyah ash-Sharqiyah (Arabic: الغارية الشرقية, romanized: Al-Gārīyah ash-Shārqīyah) also known as Eastern Ghariyah is a town in the Daraa District in southern Syria. According to the Syria Central Bureau of Statistics, it had a population of 11,945 in the 2004 census.

== Geography ==
Al-Ghariyah ash-Sharqiyah is located at latitude 32.6782 (32° 40' 42N), longitude 36.2581 (36° 15' 29E). It has an altitude of 1994ft (607m).

== History ==
In 1838, Eli Smith noted it as el-Ghureiyeh, the east, a Muslim village located "In the Nukrah, South of Eshmiskin", the Nukrah being the southern Hauran plain.

== Bibliography ==
- Robinson, E.; Smith, E. (1841). Biblical Researches in Palestine, Mount Sinai and Arabia Petraea: A Journal of Travels in the year 1838. Vol. 3. Boston: Crocker & Brewster.
