= Daraa camp =

Palestinian refugee camp in Daraa, Syria

Daraa camp is a Palestinian refugee camp in Syria, located in the city of Daraa near the Jordanian border. The camp was established on an area of 39,000 square meters in 1950–1951 in order to house Palestinian refugees from the northern and eastern parts of Palestine following the 1948 Arab-Israeli war.

Before 2011, the camp housed 10,500 refugees. Most of the population are refugees from the towns of Ijzm, Jabaa, Ain Ghazal, Samkh, Al-Shajra, Taran, Balad Al-Sheikh and Arabs Suwaitat.

The camp is located in a fertile area, and many of its residents work in agricultural fields. Others are in wage jobs.
