= Al-Yadudah, Syria =

Al-Yadudah اليادودة
- Village
- Location within Syria
- Coordinates: 32°39′55″N 36°3′40″E
- Grid position: 249/231 PAL
- Country: Syria
- Governorate: Daraa
- District: Daraa
- Subdistrict: Muzayrib

Population (2004)
  - Total: 8,967
- Time zone: UTC+3 (AST)

Al-Yadudah (Arabic: اليادودة) is a village in southern Syria, administratively part of the Daraa Governorate, located north-west of Daraa. Nearby localities include Tell Shihab to the west, Muzayrib to the northwest, Tafas to the west and Ataman to the east.

== History ==
In the Ottoman tax registers of 1596, it was a village located the nahiya (subdistrict) of Butayna, Qada of Hawran. It had a population of 29 households and 21 bachelors, all Muslims. They paid a fixed tax-rate of 25% on agricultural products, including wheat, barley, summer crops, goats and beehives, in addition to occasional revenues; a total of 4,500 akçe.

According to the Syria Central Bureau of Statistics, al-Yadudah had a population of 8,967 in the 2004 census.

== Syrian Civil War ==
On 13 September 2021, residents of the village struck a reconciliation deal with the Syrian Military, allowing Syrian army and Russian forces to enter the village.

On 11 May 2022, a Syrian soldier of the 4th Armoured Division was shot dead by insurgents in the village.

== Bibliography ==
- Hütteroth, W.-D.; Abdulfattah, K. (1977). Historical Geography of Palestine, Transjordan and Southern Syria in the Late 16th Century. Erlanger Geographische Arbeiten, Sonderband 5. Erlangen, Germany: Vorstand der Fränkischen Geographischen Gesellschaft. ISBN 3-920405-41-2.
