= Muzayrib =

Muzayrib مُزَيْرِيب
- Town
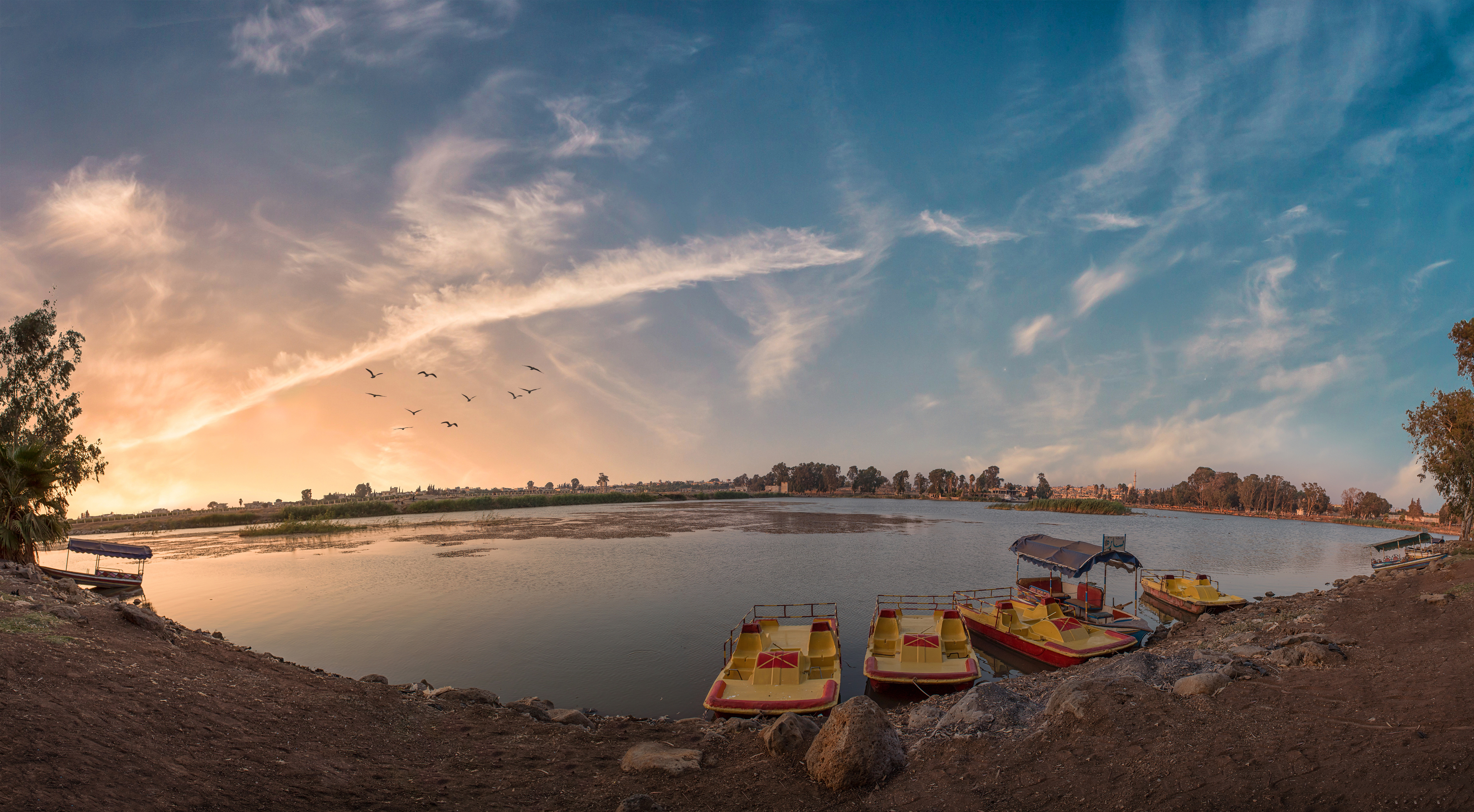
- Muzayrib Lake

- Location within Syria
- Coordinates: 32°42′39.2″N 36°1′35.8″E
- PAL: 246/235
- Country: Syria
- Governorate: Daraa
- District: Daraa
- Subdistrict: Muzayrib

Population (2004 census)
  - Total: 12,640
- Time zone: UTC+3 (AST)

Muzayrib (Arabic: مُزَيْرِيب, also spelled Mzerib, Mzeireb, Mzereeb, Mezereeb or al-Mezereeb) is a town in southern Syria, administratively part of the Daraa Governorate, located northwest of Daraa on the Jordan–Syria border. Nearby localities include al-Shaykh Saad and Nawa to the north, Da'el, Tafas and al-Shaykh Maskin to the northeast, and al-Yadudah to the southeast. According to the Syria Central Bureau of Statistics, Muzayrib had a population of 12,640 in the 2004 census. The town is also the administrative center of the Muzayrib nahiyah (subdistrict) consisting of nine villages with a combined population of 72,625. Muzayrib also has a community of Palestinian refugees.

== History ==
Under the Ottomans, the town, well known for its springs and bazaars, served as the first major resting place along the Hajj caravan route from Damascus to Mecca. Along with al-Shaykh Saad, Muzayrib served as the main administrative center for the region of Hauran. In the 16th century, a fort was built in the town on the orders of Ottoman Sultan, Selim I. Its builder was a certain Hatim Tay. The fort had a bent gateway, unlike other Hajj forts which had straight entrances, and was built from locally quarried basaltic rock. Strategically located in the hinterland of Damascus, the fort at Muzayrib was the most solid demonstration of Ottoman power over Damascus, which experienced several revolts, including by the inhabitants or the local Janissary corps. Thus, the provincial leadership of Damascus stringently controlled Muzayrib. Because of its important role in the Hajj route, large quantities of dry cakes were stored in the fort to provide for pilgrims who were dependent on the cakes for sustenance during their traversal of the desert or to supply the inhabitants of Damascus in case of a shortage. The fort also served as a place where the Damascus authorities collected taxes from pilgrims and where the amir al-hajj (Hajj caravan commander) distributed money to Bedouin tribal chiefs to dissuade them from attacking the Hajj pilgrims.

Instead of local Janissaries, imperial Ottoman troops were stationed at the fort of Muzayrib. By 1672, the fort had an 80-man imperial garrison, a 300-man force of irregulars commanded by a local military official. It was also the residence of the qadi (Islamic head judge) of Hauran. At the time, the fort contained a mosque, small bathhouse and storage rooms containing government and merchant goods. Between 1517 and 1757, the Hajj caravan at Muzayrib was attacked five times by nomadic Bedouins. In 1770, the rebel Egyptian army of Ali Bey al-Kabir led by Ismail Bey and an allied force led by Zahir al-Umar, the Arab ruler of the Galilee, stopped at Muzayrib on their way to capture Damascus. When they reached Muzayrib to face off with Governor Uthman Pasha, Ismail Bey decided to retreat because the encounter coincided with the arrival of the Hajj caravan in the town. Zahir al-Umar unsuccessfully protested the move and the rebel armies withdrew.

In 1838 Eli Smith noted that the place was located west of the Hajj road, and that it was populated with Sunni Muslims. In the 19th century, the fort at Muzayrib contained large warehouses, minor dwellings and a small mosque. A spring located to the northeast emptied into a pond containing abundant fish. Ruins were situated along the western banks of the spring. Hajj pilgrims who came to Muzayrib, which was still the main resting place of the caravan route, remained in the town for several days, and during each Hajj a large open market was held. An observer remarked at the end of the century that the place would have been blossoming, had it not been for its marshy and fever-producing surroundings.

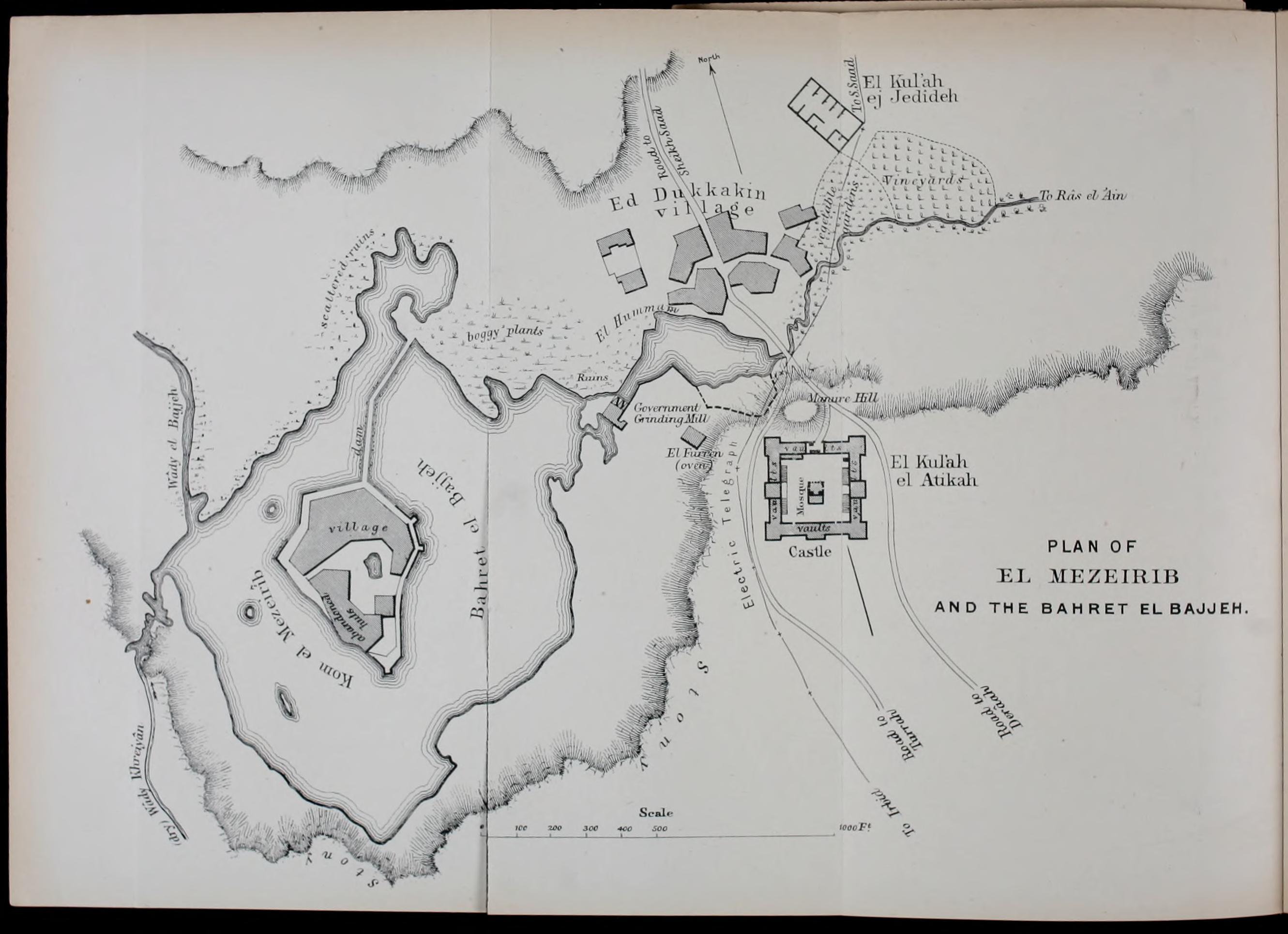
Muzayrib with fortress in an 1888 map, drawn by Gottlieb Schumacher

The city was connected to the Ottoman telegraph network based in Damascus by 1875. In the late 1880s, the fortress was in a decaying state. A narrow gauge 103 kilometres (64 mi) long railway line connecting Muzayrib with Damascus was inaugurated on 14 July 1894; the line was extended to the port city of Beirut in 1895. The railway, owing to its construction along an undeveloped trade route, was a financial failure. However, it helped to open up Lebanon and develop the agricultural industry in the fertile volcanic plains of the Golan and the Hauran, making them the leading producers of wheat crops in the Middle East. By 1898, the fort at Muzayrib was largely ruined and within ten years, about two-thirds of its masonry had been reused by the local inhabitants for modern buildings in Muzayrib and villages in the vicinity.

== Bibliography ==
- Douwes, Dick (2000). The Ottomans in Syria: a history of justice and oppression. I.B. Tauris. ISBN 1860640311.
- Hogarth, D.G. (2011). The Nearer East. Cambridge University Press. ISBN 9781108042079.
- Newbold, Captain (1846). "On the Site of Ashtaroth". Journal of the Royal Geographical Society of London. 16. Wiley-Blackwell: 331–338. doi:10.2307/1798240. JSTOR 1798240.
- Nicolle, D. (2010). Ottoman Fortifications 1300-1710. Osprey Publishing. ISBN 9781846035036.
- Peters, F. E. (1995). The Hajj: The Muslim Pilgrimage to Mecca and the Holy Places. Princeton University Press. ISBN 069102619X. "Muzayrib."
- Petersen, Andrew (2012). "8: The Hajj Route in Syria". The Medieval and Ottoman Hajj Route in Jordan: An Archaeological and Historical Study. Council for British Research in the Levant. ISBN 978-1842175026.
- Philipp, T.; Schäbler, B. (1998). The Syrian Land: Processes of Integration and Fragmentation. Franz Steiner Verlag. ISBN 9783515073097.
- Robinson, E.; Smith, E. (1841). Biblical Researches in Palestine, Mount Sinai and Arabia Petraea: A Journal of Travels in the year 1838. Vol. 3. Boston: Crocker & Brewster.
- Rogan, E. (2009). The Arabs. Basic Books. ISBN 978-0465020065.
- Socin, A. (1876). Palestine and Syria: Handbook for travellers. Karl Baedeker.
- Schumacher, G. (1897). "Der Südliche Basan". Zeitschrift des Deutschen Palästina-Vereins. 19–20: 65–227.
