= Al-Karak, Syria =

Village in Syria

Al-Karak الكرك
- Village
- Location in Syria
- Coordinates: 32°41′14″N 36°21′3″E
- Grid position: 276/232 PAL
- Country: Syria
- Governorate: Daraa
- District: Daraa
- Subdistrict: Musayfira

Population (2004)
  - Total: 10,510
- Time zone: UTC+3 (AST)
- City Qrya Pcode: C6047

Al-Karak (Arabic: الكرك) is a Syrian village in Daraa District in Daraa Governorate. According to the Syria Central Bureau of Statistics (CBS), al-Karak had a population of 10,510 in the 2004 census.

== History ==
In 1596, Al-Karak appeared in the Ottoman tax registers as 'Karak al-Bathaniyya'; part of the nahiya (subdistrict) of Bani Malik al-Ashraf in the Hauran Sanjak. It had an entirely Muslim population consisting of 45 households and 71 bachelors. The villagers paid a fixed tax rate of 40% on various agricultural products, including wheat (10800 akçe), barley (1800), summer crops (4200), goats and beehives (1700), in addition to "occasional revenues"(1500); a total of 20,000 akçe. 5/24 of the revenue went to a waqf.

In 1838, it was noted as a Sunni Muslim village, situated "In the Nukrah, South of Eshmiskin", the Nukrah being the southern Hauran plain.

== Bibliography ==
- Hütteroth, W.-D.; Abdulfattah, K. (1977). Historical Geography of Palestine, Transjordan and Southern Syria in the Late 16th Century. Erlanger Geographische Arbeiten, Sonderband 5. Erlangen, Germany: Vorstand der Fränkischen Geographischen Gesellschaft. ISBN 3-920405-41-2.
- Robinson, E.; Smith, E. (1841). Biblical Researches in Palestine, Mount Sinai and Arabia Petraea: A Journal of Travels in the year 1838. Vol. 3. Boston: Crocker & Brewster.
