= Johann Gottfried Wetzstein =

Prussian diplomat (1815–1905)

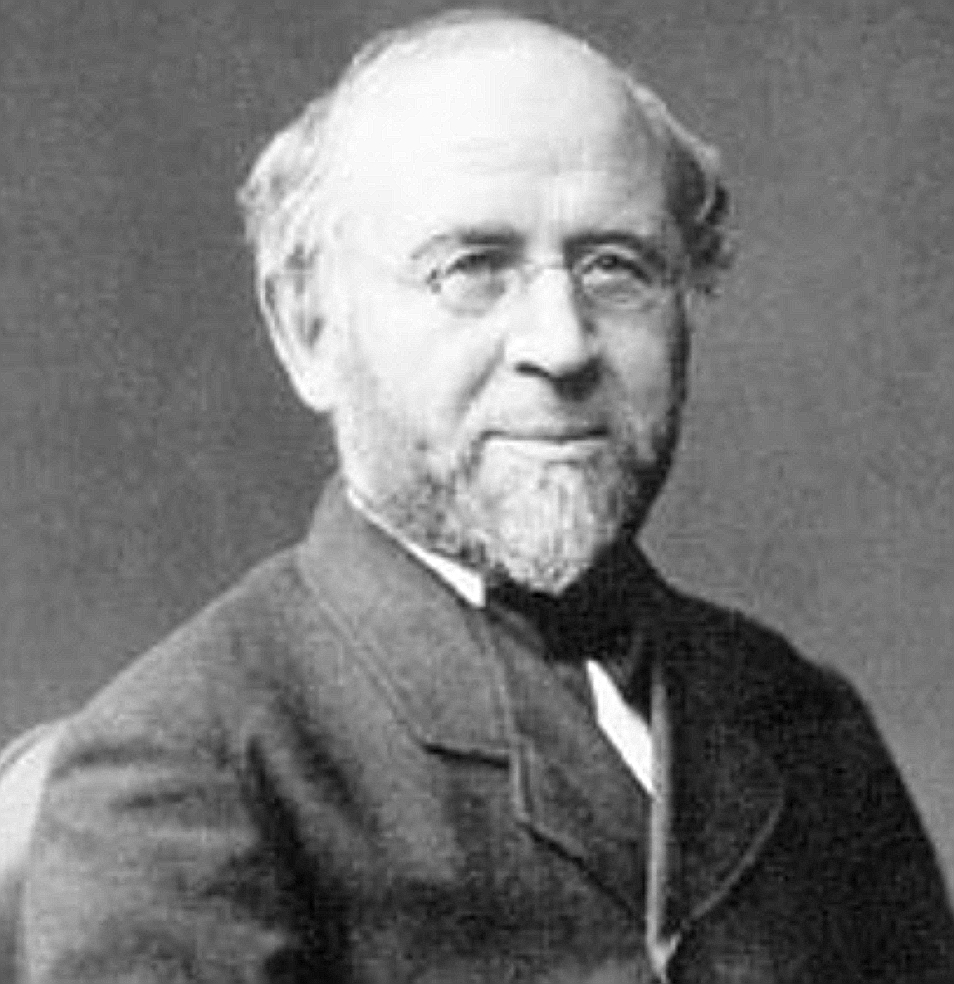
Johann Gottfried Wetzstein in 1884

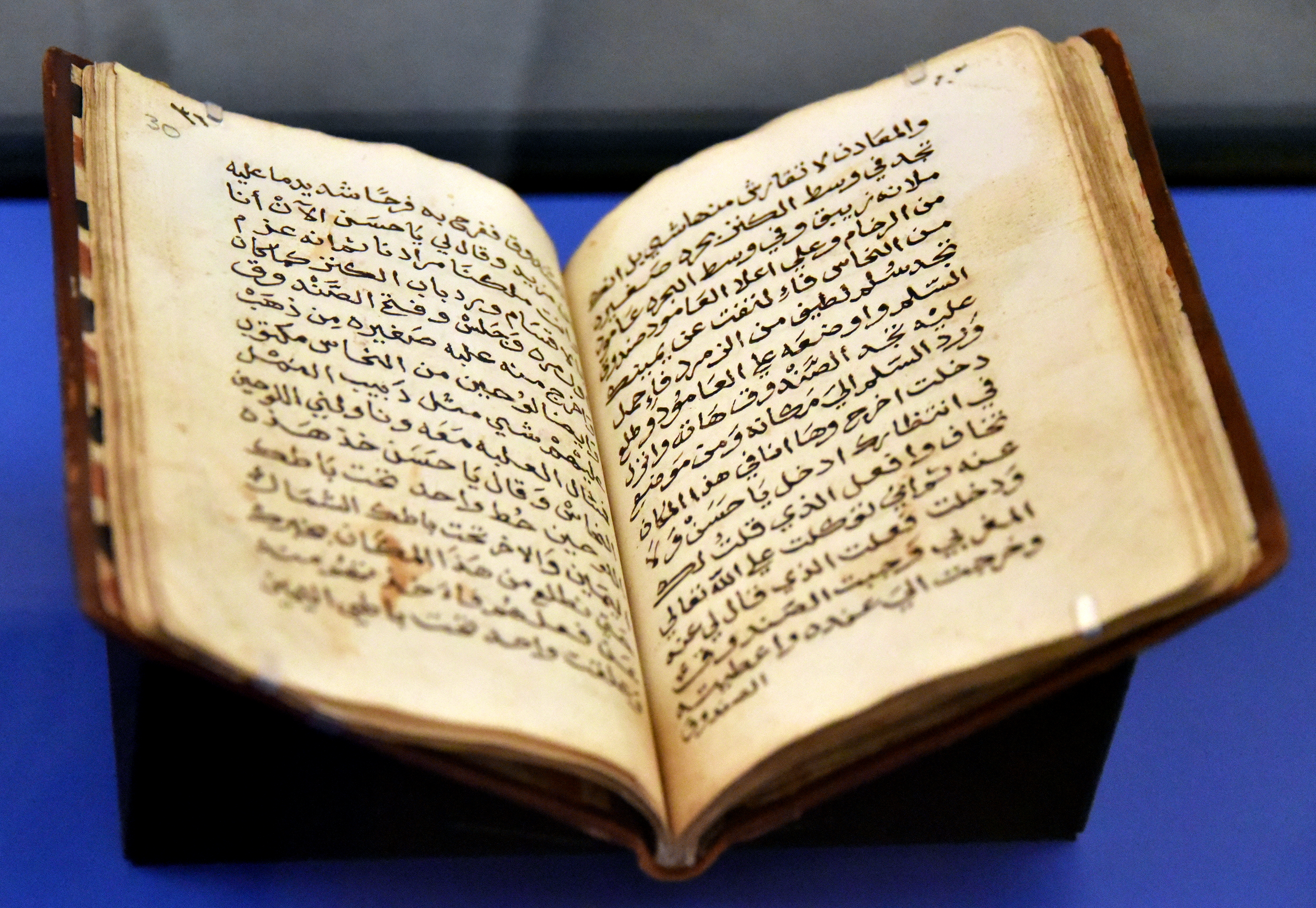
Tales of Arabian Nights from the collection of Johann Gottfried Wetzstein, Syrian, 18th century CE

Dr. Johann Gottfried Wetzstein (19 February 1815 – 18 January 1905) was an Orientalist and a Prussian diplomat. He was the Prussian consul in Damascus, Syria, Ottoman Empire, and he was an Orientalist academic. He was consul from 1848 to 1862.

He interceded on behalf of the Syrian Christians in 1860.

== Works ==
- Wetzstein, J.G. (1860). Reisebericht über Hauran und die Trachonen nebst einem Anhange über die sabaïschen Denkmäler in (in German). Berlin: Dietrich Reimer.
- Wetzstein, J.G. (1863). Catalog arabischer Manuscripte in Damaskus gesammelt (in German). Berlin.
- Wetzstein, J.G. (1864). Ausgewählte griechische und lateinische Inschriften gesammelt auf Reisen in den Trachonen und um das Haurângebirge (in German). Berlin.

== Bibliography ==
- Schwanitz, Wolfgang (Ed.): Germany and the Middle East, 1871–1945. 2002.
- Ingeborg Huhn: Der Orientalist Johann Gottfried Wetzstein als preußischer Konsul in Damaskus (1849–1861): dargestellt nach seinen hinterlassenen Papieren. Islamkundliche Untersuchungen Bd. 136. Berlin: Schwarz, 1989. ISBN 3-922968-89-9
- Ingeborg Huhn: Der Nachlass des Orientalisten Johann Gottfried Wetzstein in der Handschriftenabteilung der Staatsbibliothek zu Berlin - Preussischer Kulturbesitz. Kataloge der Handschriftenabteilung: Reihe 2, Nachlässe Bd. 9. Harrassowitz Verlag, Wiesbaden 2006.
- Gerhard Küchler: "Johann Gottfried Wetzstein. Königlich Preußischer Konsul in Damaskus 1848–1862, Orientalist und Freund Alexander von Humboldts." in: Jahrbuch für Brandenburgische Landesgeschichte 29 (1978), S. 7-24.
- Baron, Salo: "The Jews and the Syrian Massacres of 1860", In: Proceedings of the American Academy for Jewish Research, Vol. 4 (1932–1933), pp. 3–31.
