= Zu'bi M.F. Al-Zu'bi =

Jordanian academic (born 1977)

Zu'bi M. F. Al-Zu'bi
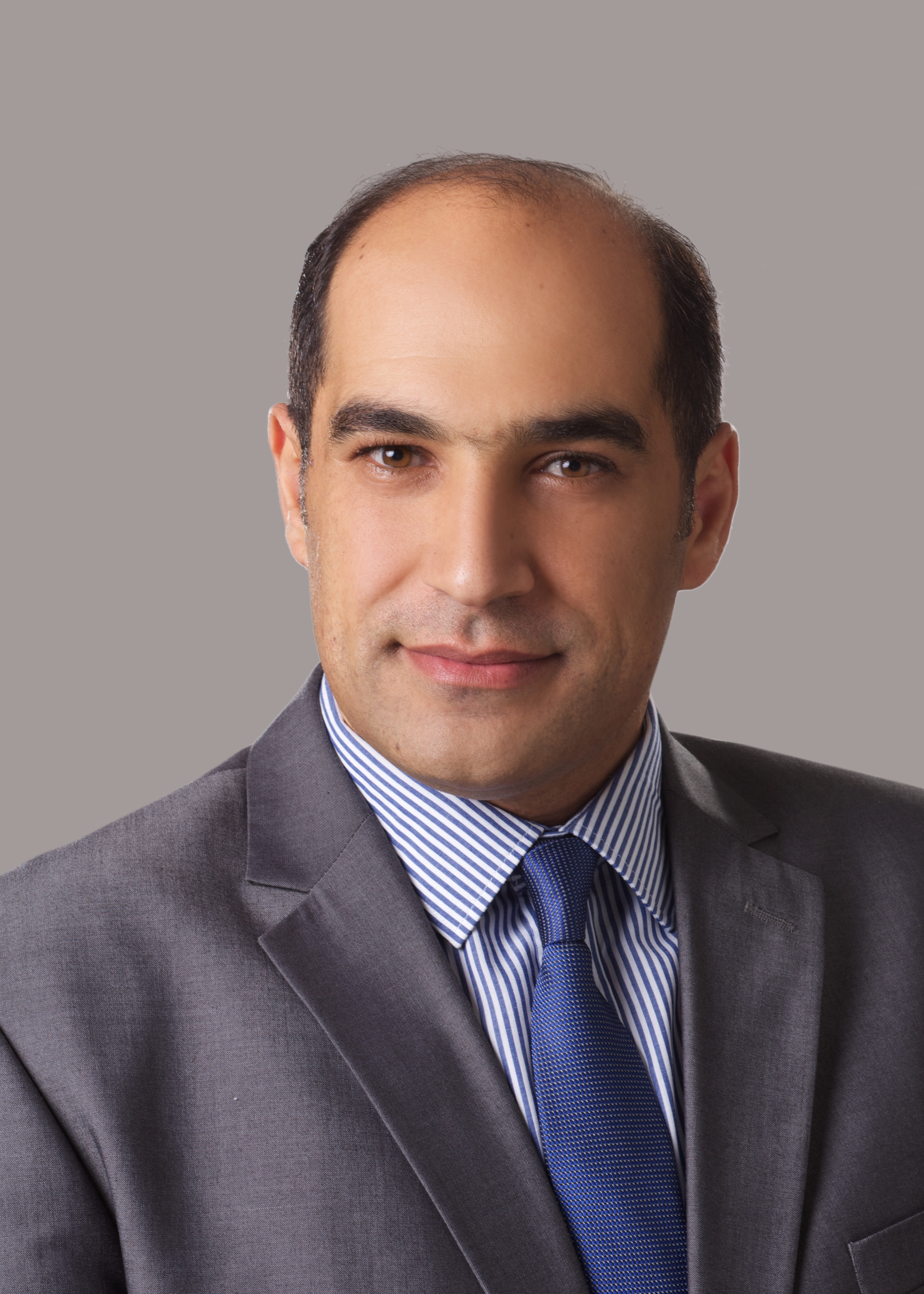
- Born: 5 May 1977 (age 49); Amman, Jordan

Academic background
- Education: Durham University; University of Jordan

Academic work
- Discipline: Business Management
- Institutions: University of Jordan

Zu'bi M.F. Al-Zu'bi was born in Amman, Jordan, as the second youngest of ten children. He received his B.Sc. in Business Administration from Mu'tah University in Amman, graduating first in his class with distinction. Afterwards, he taught at the New English School (Jordan) as a Business Studies teacher in the IGSCE program. Zu'bi received his M.B.A. from the University of Jordan in 2002 and accepted a position there as a professor in the Business Management department immediately following his graduation.

In 2003, he was awarded a scholarship from the University of Jordan to pursue doctoral studies in the United Kingdom, at Durham University. At Durham, Zu'bi continued to teach undergraduate and Masters level courses, and also served two consecutive terms as president of his college, Ustinov College, where he coined the college's first motto, "Diversitate Valemus". Other notable accomplishments while at Durham University include his nomination by Durham University students as the best college president and becoming the first Jordanian to hold the fellowship of the Higher Education Academy. He received his Ph.D. in 2008.

== Career ==
Upon his return to Jordan, Zu'bi was immediately appointed to the position of Assistant Dean of the Faculty of Business at the University of Jordan. Soon after, in 2010, he published his first book, on mass customization, inspired by his PhD thesis. In 2011, he became the chairman the Business Management department, and headed numerous committees on quality of higher education, private sector development, and diplomatic training programs.

Zu'bi has also worked with the Columbia University Middle East Research Center (CUMERC) on a series of events and seminars to discuss the economic reforms in Jordan midst the Arab Spring. He has published several articles on the Jordanian economy, innovation, mass customization, and political and economic reform in the Middle East.

In 2013, Zu'bi became the Dean of the business school of the University of Jordan. In the same year he published his second book (Operations Management) with Render and Heizer by Pearsons Publishing; which generated a lot of interest in the operations of businesses in the Middle East due to the lack of insight back then into the organizational culture that dominated firms from Morocco to United Arab Emirates. later that year he won the best researcher award in Jordan for the success this publication achieved. In 2016, he became the President Pro Vice Chancellor for Development and International Relations where he has advised the President of the University of Jordan on sustainability, fundraising, development and Alumni relations. He also formulated and executed the new development plan for the University of Jordan for 2025.

== Publications ==
Books:

- Al-Zu'bi, Zu'bi M. F. (2010). Collaboration in mass customisation: Exploring the impacts of suppliers and lead users. VDM Publishing. ISBN 978-3-63-924528-8.
- Heizer, Jay H.; Render, Barry; Al-Zu'bi, Zu'bi M. F. (2013). Operations Management. Pearson. ISBN 978-1-44-790303-1. Archived from the original on 2023-11-05.
- Asutay, Mehmet; Al-Zu'bi, Zu'bi M. F. (2021). The Role of Islamic Finance in Supporting Microenterprises and SMEs Against COVID-19 (PDF). COMCEC. ISBN 978-625-7621-02-1.

Notable Referenced Journal Articles :

- An outsourcing model for lead users: an empirical investigation (Production Planning & Control, 2012) with Christos Tsinopoulos
- Suppliers versus lead users: examining their relative impact on product variety (Journal of Product Innovation Management, 2012) with Christos Tsinopoulos
- Clockspeed effectiveness of lead users and product experts (International Journal of Operations and Production Management, 2011) with Christos Tsinopoulos
