= Nasib Border Crossing =

- Coordinates: 32°31′43″N 36°12′03″E
- Carries: Commercial goods, vehicles
- Crosses: Border between Jordan and Syria
- Locale: Jabir as-Sirhan, Jordan; Nasib, Syria
- Official name: Nasib Border Crossing مركز نصيب الحدودي

Location
- Interactive map of Nasib Border Crossing

The Nasib Border Crossing (Arabic: مركز نصيب الحدودي, romanized: Markaz Naṣīb al-Ḥudūdī), also known as Jaber Border Crossing, is an international border crossing between Syria and Jordan. It is one of the busiest border crossings in Syria and is situated on the Damascus-Amman international highway near Nasib, Syria. It is the main crossing for Syrian exports to Jordan and the GCC countries.

== History ==
=== Syrian civil war ===
In April 2015, the crossing fell to control of Free Syrian Army and al-Nusra Front during the Battle of Nasib Border Crossing. On 6 July 2018, the Ba'athist Syrian army recaptured the Nasib Border Crossing in the 2018 Southern Syria offensive.

The Nasib Border Crossing was officially reopened on 15 October 2018.

After closing again due to the COVID pandemic in 2020, as well as the 2021 Daraa clashes, the Nasib Border Crossing reopened on 29 September 2021.

On 6 December 2024 Jordan again closed its border with Syria after the Syrian opposition seized this crossing in a renewed offensive.

=== Renovation ===
Renovation works on the border crossing began at the beginning of 2026 and were completed on 25 March 2026.

The project included the restoration of infrastructure, the refurbishment of arrival and departure halls, and the construction of a new hall dedicated to tourist vehicles. The upgrades significantly increased the crossing's daily capacity from 10,000 travellers to approximately 40,000.
