= Al-Jiza, Syria =

Al-Jiza الجيزة
- Town
- Location within Syria
- Coordinates: 32°34′12″N 36°18′59″E
- Grid position: 273/219
- Country: Syria
- Governorate: Daraa
- District: Daraa
- Subdistrict: Al-Jiza

Population (2004)
  - Total: 14,700
- Time zone: UTC+3 (AST)

Al-Jiza (Arabic: الجيزة) is a town in southern Syria, administratively part of the Daraa Governorate, located east of Daraa. Nearby localities include al-Mataaiya to the south, Ghasm to the southeast, al-Sahwah to the northeast, al-Musayfirah to the north, Kahil to the northwest and al-Taybeh to the west.

== History ==
In the Ottoman tax registers of 1596, it was a village located the nahiya of Butayna, part of Qada Hawran, under the name of Jiza. It had a population of 19 households and 7 bachelors, all Muslims. They paid a fixed tax-rate of 40% on agricultural products, including wheat, barley, summer crops, goats and beehives, in addition to occasional revenues; a total of 7,215 akçe. All of the revenue went to a waqf.

In 1838, el-Jizeh was noted as a ruin, situated "In the Nukrah, west of Busrah".

According to the Syria Central Bureau of Statistics, al-Jiza had a population of 14,700 in the 2004 census. It is the administrative center of the al-Jiza nahiyah ("subdistrict") which consisted of three localities with a collective population of 21,100 in 2004.

== Notable residents ==
- Hamza Ali al-Khateeb (1997-2011), 13-year-old boy who died while in government custody

== Bibliography ==
- Deutscher Verein zur Erforschung Palästinas; Robinson, Edward (1896). Zeitschrift des Deutschen Palästina-Vereins. Vol. 19–20. O. Harrassowitz.
- Hütteroth, W.-D.; Abdulfattah, K. (1977). Historical Geography of Palestine, Transjordan and Southern Syria in the Late 16th Century. Erlanger Geographische Arbeiten, Sonderband 5. Erlangen, Germany: Vorstand der Fränkischen Geographischen Gesellschaft. ISBN 3-920405-41-2.
- Robinson, E.; Smith, E. (1841). Biblical Researches in Palestine, Mount Sinai and Arabia Petraea: A Journal of Travels in the year 1838. Vol. 3. Boston: Crocker & Brewster.
