= Nasib, Syria =

Nasib نصيب
- Village
- Location in Syria
- Coordinates: 32°33′19″N 36°11′4″E
- Grid position: 261/217 PAL
- Country: Syria
- Governorate: Daraa
- District: Daraa
- Subdistrict: Daraa

Government
  - Mayor: Munir al-Ghuthani
- Elevation: 576 m (1,890 ft)

Population (2004)
  - Total: 5,780
- Time zone: UTC+3 (AST)
- City Qrya Pcode: C5999

Nasib (Arabic: نصيب) is a Syrian village located in Daraa District, Daraa. According to the Syria Central Bureau of Statistics (CBS), Nasib had a population of 5,780 in the 2004 census. The Nasib Border Crossing between Syria and Jordan is located near the village.

== History ==
In 1897, Gottlieb Schumacher noted that it had 50 houses and 200 inhabitants. The villagers possessed good arable land, but suffered from lack of water.

== Bibliography ==
- Schumacher; et al. (1897). "Der Südliche Basan". Zeitschrift des Deutschen Palästina-Vereins. 19–20: 65–227.
