= Khirbet Ghazaleh =

Khirbet Ghazaleh خربة غزالة Khirbet Ghazalah
- Town
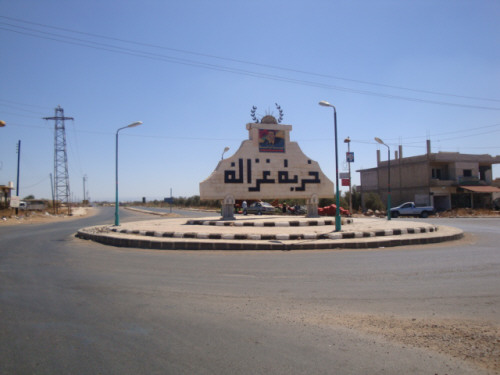
- Entrance to Khirbet Ghazaleh

- Location within Syria
- Coordinates: 32°44′N 36°12′E
- Grid position: 262/239
- Country: Syria
- Governorate: Daraa
- District: Daraa
- Subdistrict: Khirbet Ghazaleh

Population (2004)
  - Total: 16,240
- Time zone: UTC+3 (AST)

Khirbet Ghazaleh (Arabic: خربة غزالة also spelled Khirbet Ghazalah) is a town in the Daraa Governorate, roughly 17 kilometers northeast of Daraa adjacent to Da'el in the west and near Izra' to the north. It is situated on the main highway between Damascus and Amman. In the 2004 census by the Central Bureau of Statistics Khirbet Ghazaleh had a population of 16,240. Its inhabitants are predominantly Muslims.

== History ==
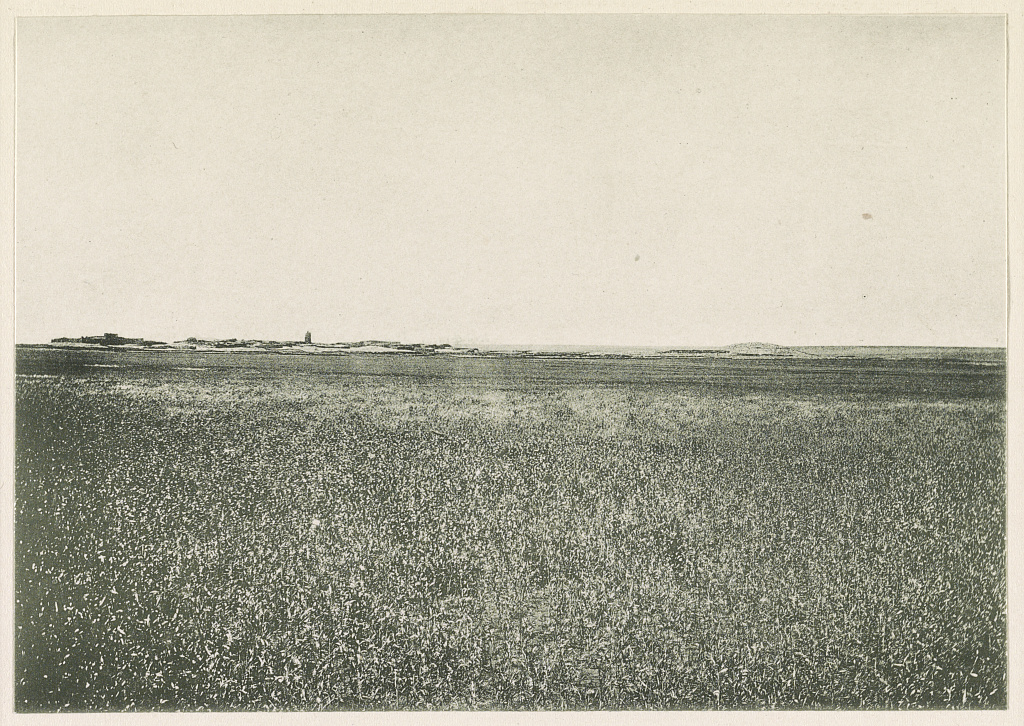
Khirbet Ghazaleh in 1916

In 1596 it appeared in the Ottoman tax registers under the name of Kutaybit Tamir, being part of the nahiya of Bani Malik al-Asraf, in the Hauran Sanjak. It had an entirely Muslim population consisting of 29 households and 12 bachelors. They paid a fixed tax-rate of 40% on agricultural products, including wheat, barley, summer crops, goats and bee-hives; a total of 12,700 akçe. Two-thirds of the income went to a Waqf.

In 1805, Ulrich Jasper Seetzen found it to be "a bad, ruined village where 100 Muhammadan and 15 Greek Christian families lived". According to the Christian priest of the time, Chirhet el-Ghazale was formerly the seat of Syrian kings and was called "Soria", "even the apartment of the former ruler could still be seen". By Burckhardt's time, the place had crumbled.

In 1838, its inhabitants were again noted as being Muslim.

In 1897, Gottlieb Schumacher noted that this "very large village consists of [] over 200 houses and 1000 to 1200 inhabitants. Three large water reservoirs with old sarcophagi as troughs and many old buildings can be found, but no inscriptions. The madaf (guesthouse) is spacious and well built and surrounded by a paved courtyard."

=== Civil war ===
Khirbet Ghazaleh's residents have participated in protests against the Syrian government and have hosted opposition Free Syrian Army (FSA) during the Syrian uprising. On 14 November 2011, following an FSA attack on a security police bus traveling on a nearby intersection, the Syrian Army launched an armor-backed assault against the town, resulting in the deaths of 20 FSA members, local opposition fighters and civilians. According to an opposition activist in Khirbet Ghazaleh, the FSA clashed with the Syrian Army troops while Bedouins from surrounding villages arrived to aid the town's residents.

On 18 March 2012 opposition armed groups destroyed an overpass on the main highway with the stated purpose of blocking the arrival of army tanks to the area. The state-owned Syrian Arab News Agency (SANA) confirmed the bombing of the bridge and estimated the costs of damage to be over $5 million.

On 8 May 2013, the Syrian army captured the town after a ferocious two-month bombardment, regaining control of an international transit route, according to opposition sources. Khirbet Ghazaleh acted as a vital logistical town for Syrian Armed Forces during the Daraa offensive (February–May 2014).

== Bibliography ==
- Schumacher; et al. (1897). "Der Südliche Basan". Zeitschrift des Deutschen Palästina-Vereins. 19–20: 65–227.
- Hütteroth, W.-D.; Abdulfattah, K. (1977). Historical Geography of Palestine, Transjordan and Southern Syria in the Late 16th Century. Erlanger Geographische Arbeiten, Sonderband 5. Erlangen, Germany: Vorstand der Fränkischen Geographischen Gesellschaft. ISBN 3-920405-41-2.
- Robinson, E.; Smith, E. (1841). Biblical Researches in Palestine, Mount Sinai and Arabia Petraea: A Journal of Travels in the year 1838. Vol. 3. Boston: Crocker & Brewster.
- Seetzen, U.J. (1810). A Brief Account of the Countries Adjoining the Lake of Tiberias, the Jordan, and the Dead Sea. London: Palestine Association of London.
