= Hanna Batatu =

Palestinian-American historian (1926–2000)

- حنّا بطاطو
- Born: 1926; Jerusalem, Mandatory Palestine
- Died: 24 June 2000 (aged 73–74); Winsted, Connecticut, U.S.

Academic background
- Education: Walsh School of Foreign Service Harvard University

Academic work
- Discipline: Historian
- Institutions: American University of Beirut Georgetown University

Hanna Batatu (Arabic: حنّا بطاطو, Ḥannā Baṭāṭu; 1926 in Jerusalem – 24 June 2000 in Winsted, Connecticut, U.S.) was a Palestinian Marxist historian specialising in the history of Iraq and the modern Arab east. His work on Iraq is widely considered the preeminent study of modern Iraqi history.

Born in Jerusalem in 1926 to a Palestinian Arab Christian family, Hanna Batatu emigrated to the United States in 1948, the year of the Nakba. From 1951 to 1953, he studied at Georgetown University's Edmund A. Walsh School of Foreign Service. He gained his doctorate at political science in Harvard University in 1960, with a dissertation titled The Shaykh and the Peasant in Iraq, 1917-1958. From 1962 to 1982 he taught at the American University of Beirut, then from 1982 until his retirement in 1994 at Georgetown University in the United States.

Batatu started studying Iraqi history in the 1950s, taking a particular interest in the revolutionary movements that were active at the time and especially the Iraqi Communist Party. From the late 1950s on he traveled to Iraq several times, and succeeded in gaining access to communist political prisoners and secret police files before the revolution of 1958. He was allowed access to security service archives from various periods of Iraqi history, up until the 1970s, and used this and his personal contacts from different political movements to write a book on political change in Iraq, The Old Social Classes and New Revolutionary Movements of Iraq (published in 1978). This work, although largely focusing on the Iraqi Communist Party, also provides a wealth of information about the other revolutionary movements in the country as well as the ruling classes prior to 1958, and is considered one of the fundamental works on modern Iraqi history. Batatu's methodology is grounded in political sociology and considers in detail the social factors for the developments he covers, and even more so the social composition of the movements in question.

Batatu also undertook a similar study of Syria, Syria's Peasantry, the Descendants of Its Lesser Rural Notables, and Their Politics (published in 1999).
