= Daraa =

City in southwestern Syria

Daraa دَرْعَا
- City
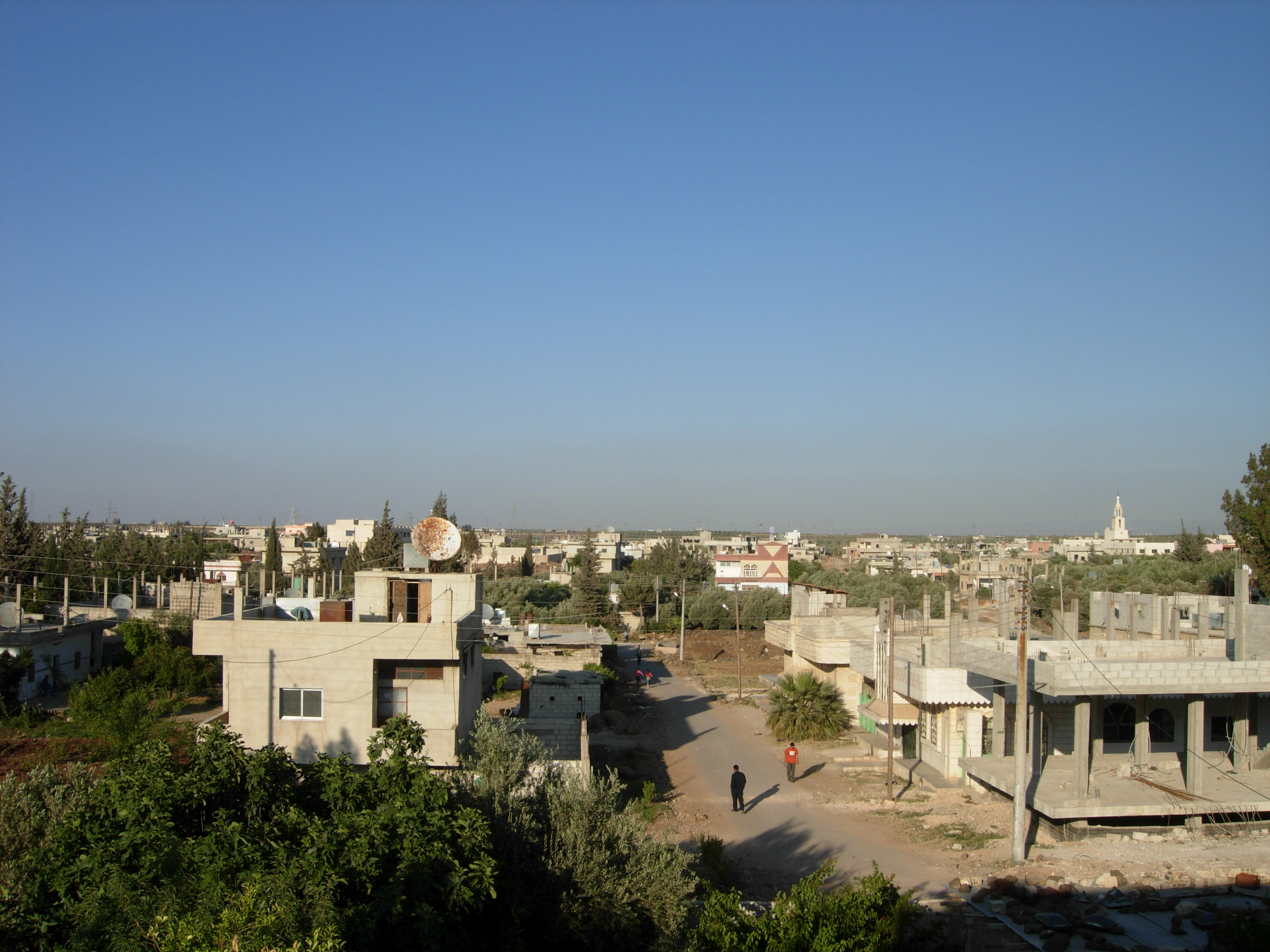
- Daraa in 2008
- Interactive map of Daraa
- Location within Syria
- Coordinates: 32°37′N 36°6′E
- Grid position: 253/224 PAL
- Country: Syria
- Governorate: Daraa
- District: Daraa
- Subdistrict: Daraa
- Elevation: 435 m (1,427 ft)

Population (2004 census)
  - Total: 97,969
- Demonym(s): Arabic: درعاوي, romanized: Darʿāwi
- Time zone: UTC+3 (AST)
- Area code: 15
- Geocode: C5993
- Website: http://www.esyria.sy/edaraa/

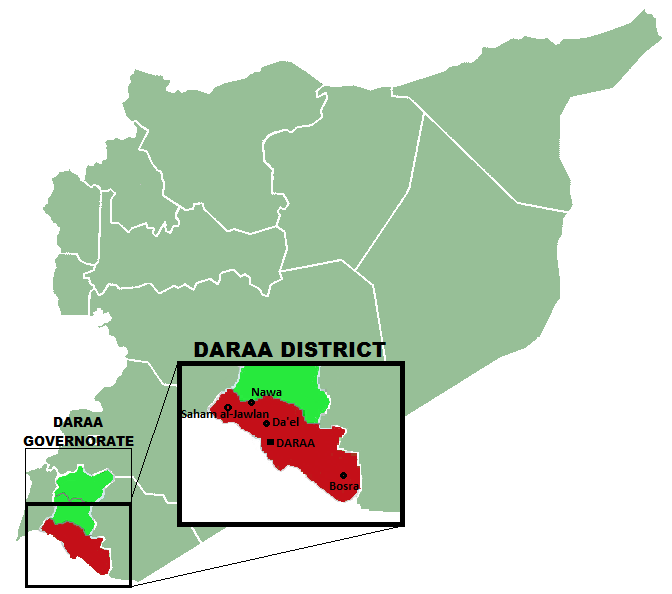
Location of Daraa city in the namesake district and governorate.

Daraa (Arabic: دَرْعَا, romanized: Darʿā, Levantine Arabic: [ˈdarʕa]) is a city in southwestern Syria 13 kilometres (8.1 mi) north of the Jordan–Syria border. It is the capital of Daraa Governorate in the Hauran region. Located 90 kilometres (56 mi) south of Damascus on the Damascus–Amman highway, it serves as a waystation for travelers. Nearby localities include Umm al-Mayazen and Nasib to the southeast, al-Naimah to the east, Ataman to the north, al-Yaduda to the northwest, and ar-Ramtha in Jordan to the southwest.

According to the Syrian Central Bureau of Statistics, Daraa had a population of 97,969 in the 2004 census. It is the administrative center of a nāhiya (subdistrict) which contained eight localities with a collective population of 146,481 in 2004. Its inhabitants are predominantly Sunni Muslims.

Daraa became known as the "Cradle of the Revolution" after the arrest of 15 boys from prominent families for painting graffiti with anti-government slogans which sparked the beginning of the 2011 Syrian revolution.

== History ==
=== Ancient history ===
Daraa is an ancient city dating to the Late Bronze Age. It was mentioned in texts from the New Kingdom of Egypt of the reign of Thutmose III (1490-1436 BCE) as the city of Atharaa. The Hebrew Bible refers to it as Edrei (Biblical Hebrew: אֶדְרֶעִי, romanized: Eḏreʿi), the capital of Bashan, site of a battle where the Israelites defeated Og. According to Jewish tradition, Eldad and Medad were buried in Edrei.

=== Classical era ===
During the Seleucid Empire, and the Roman Empire after 106, the city was known as Adraa (Koine Greek: Ἀδράα), and appears on its coinage. It was incorporated into the province of Arabia Petraea.

By the 3rd century, it had gained the status of polis or self-governed city. The Roman historian Eusebius referred to it. The area east of Adraa was a centre of the Ebionites. Adraa itself was a Christian bishopric. Arabio, the first bishop of Adraa whose name is known, participated in the Council of Seleucia of 359. Uranius was at the First Council of Constantinople in 381; Proclus at the anti-Eutyches synod of Constantinople in 448 and the Council of Chalcedon in 451; and Dorimenius at the Second Council of Constantinople in 553. No longer a residential bishopric, Adraa is today listed by the Catholic Church as a titular see. It was also a centre of monastic and missionary activity in the Syrian Desert.

In 614, the Sasanian Empire sacked Adraa during the Byzantine–Sasanian War of 602–628, but spared the inhabitants.

=== Islamic era ===
According to ibn Hisham and al-Waqidi, 9th-century biographers of the Islamic prophet Muhammad, the Jewish tribes of Arabia of the Banu Nadir and Banu Qaynuqa migrated to Adhri'at, as it was known during the early Islamic conquests, following their expulsion from Medina. However, historian Moshe Sharon says this does not appear in Jewish or earlier Muslim sources. Situated between the major Jewish centres of Syria Palaestina and Lower Mesopotamia, Adhri'at had a large Jewish population in the early 7th century and served as a place of Jewish learning. Its residents lit an annual bonfire before Rosh Hashanah to alert the Jewish communities of Mesopotamia to the start of the New Year.

Early Muslim historian al-Baladhuri lists Adhri'at as one of the towns conquered by the Muslim army following the Battle of Mu'tah in 629 and forced to pay the jizya. However, contemporary sources maintain that Adhri'at was conquered by the Rashidun army during the caliphate of Abu Bakr in 634. Adhri'at's residents reportedly celebrated the arrival of the second caliph, Umar, when he visited the city, "dancing with swords and sweet basil." Throughout Rashidun and Umayyad caliphates, the city served as the capital of the al-Bathaniyya subdistrict, part of the larger Jund Dimashq ("military district of Damascus").

In 906, the population was massacred in a raid by the rebellious Qarmatians. The late 10th-century geographer al-Muqaddasi noted that during the Abbasid Caliphate, Adhri'at was a major administrative center on the edge of the desert. He claimed the city was part of the Jund al-Urdunn district and that its territory was "full of villages" and included the region of Jerash to the south of the Yarmouk River.

Throughout the early Islamic period, it served as a strategic station on the Hajj caravan route between Damascus and Medina and as the gate to central Syria. The Crusaders temporarily conquered Adhri'at, then known as Adratum, during the reign of Baldwin II of Jerusalem in 1118.

According to Yaqut al-Hamawi, in the early 13th century during Ayyubid dynasty, Adhri'at was "celebrated for the many learned men who were natives of the place." Under the Mamluk Sultanate and the Ottoman Empire, the city maintained its importance. In 1596 Daraa appeared in the Ottoman tax registers as madinat Idra'a and was part of the nahiya of Butayna (Bathaniyya) in the Hauran Sanjak of Ottoman Syria. It had a Muslim population of 120 households and 45 bachelors. A 40% tax−rate was levied on wheat, barley, summer crops, goats and/or beehives; a total of 26,500 akçe.

In 1838, Eli Smith listed Daraa as a Muslim, Catholic, and Greek Orthodox village in the Nuqrah (southern Hauran plain) south of al-Shaykh Maskin.

=== Modern era ===
Following the construction of the Hejaz Railway, Daraa became a chief junction of the railroad. In his book Seven Pillars and a letter to a military colleague, T. E. Lawrence says he was captured by the Ottoman military in Daraa, where he was beaten and sexually abused by the local Bey and his guardsmen. During the Battle of Megiddo, Lawrence led the Arab Revolt in cutting the southern rail line at Mafraq, the northern at Tell Arar, and the western by Mezerib. On 27 September 1918, the Arab Northern Army captured Daraa from the retreating Ottoman forces.

Daraa is the southernmost city of Syria near the border with Jordan and a major midpoint between Damascus and Amman.

After the Syrian Ba'ath Party gained power following the 1963 coup, the new interior minister Amin al-Hafiz appointed Abd al-Rahman al-Khlayfawi as governor of Daraa until 1965. Daraa had recently, before the Syrian Civil War, suffered from reduced water supply in the region and had been straining under the influx of internal refugees who were forced to leave their northeastern lands due to a drought exacerbated by the government's lack of provision.

==== Syrian civil war ====
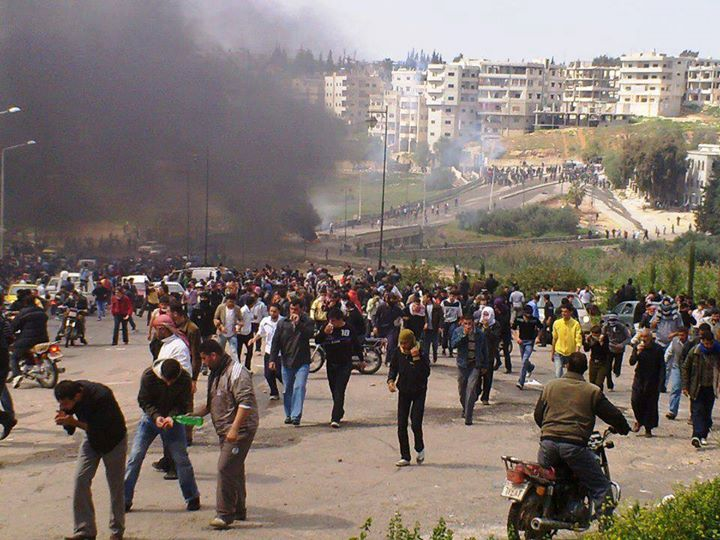
Protests in 2013

Daraa played an important role by the start of the Syrian revolution against the government led by President Bashar al-Assad as part of the Arab Spring protests with hundreds of thousands of people protesting in the city. The uprising was sparked on 6 March 2011, when at least 15 youths were arrested and tortured for scrawling graffiti on their school wall denouncing the Assad government. The family and friends of the detained youths and tens of thousands of locals marched on the streets on 18 March, demanding their release. According to activists, this protest was faced with Syrian security forces opening fire on the protesters, killing four people. Protests continued daily.

During this time the local courthouse, the Ba'ath party headquarters in the city, and the Syriatel building owned by Rami Makhlouf, a cousin of President Assad, were set on fire. What followed was a government assault on the city as violence continued and intensified all across Syria. On 25 April 2011, the Syrian Armed Forces launched the Siege of Daraa in a crackdown on protesters. The operation lasted until 5 May 2011, killing and arresting tens of thousands of locals in the process.

On 16 February 2012, the Syrian Army reportedly attacked Daraa, shelling the city heavily. This was apparently because, "Daraa has been regaining its role in the uprising. Demonstrations resumed and the Free Syrian Army provided security for protests in some parts of the city." The attack was part of a security force push "to regain control of areas they lost in recent weeks", indicating that the FSA in Daraa had taken control of parts of the city. Security forces attacked at least three districts, but FSA fighters fought back, firing at Syrian Army roadblocks and buildings housing security police and militiamen. On 14 March 2012, the Free Syrian Army controlled at least one main district in the city of Daraa (al-Balad district) prompting the Syrian army to attack it with anti-aircraft guns.

In early June 2017, much of Daraa was reported to have been destroyed by protracted fighting. On 12 July 2018, the battle for Daraa ended after several days of intense clashes between the Syrian Army and rebel forces, some of which agreed to terms of reconciliation. The Syrian Army retook the city fully.

The March 2020 Daraa clashes and 2021 Daraa offensive ended with Syrian Army victory. After that, the Syrian government fully recaptured the city, reestablished state institutions there, and restarted the reconciliation process.

On 6 December 2024, local rebels began an offensive to take the city. 90% of the governorate, including the city itself, fell under their control.

== Geography ==
The city also contains a Palestinian refugee camp, known as Daraa camp.

The city is divided into two sections; Daraa al-Mahatta, which is the northern portion, and Daraa al-Balad, which is the southern part of the city.

=== Climate ===
Daraa has a cold semi-arid climate (Köppen climate classification BSk).

Climate data for Dara'a (1972–2004)
Month	Jan	Feb	Mar	Apr	May	Jun	Jul	Aug	Sep	Oct	Nov	Dec	Year
Mean daily maximum °C (°F)	13.3 (55.9)	14.7 (58.5)	18.0 (64.4)	23.6 (74.5)	28.5 (83.3)	31.3 (88.3)	32.6 (90.7)	32.6 (90.7)	31.3 (88.3)	27.8 (82.0)	21.0 (69.8)	15.2 (59.4)	24.2 (75.5)
Daily mean °C (°F)	8.3 (46.9)	9.4 (48.9)	12.0 (53.6)	16.5 (61.7)	20.5 (68.9)	23.6 (74.5)	25.5 (77.9)	25.6 (78.1)	23.9 (75.0)	20.3 (68.5)	14.4 (57.9)	9.9 (49.8)	17.5 (63.5)
Mean daily minimum °C (°F)	3.2 (37.8)	4.0 (39.2)	6.0 (42.8)	9.3 (48.7)	12.5 (54.5)	15.8 (60.4)	18.3 (64.9)	18.6 (65.5)	16.5 (61.7)	12.8 (55.0)	7.8 (46.0)	4.6 (40.3)	10.8 (51.4)
Average precipitation mm (inches)	60.9 (2.40)	49.4 (1.94)	42.3 (1.67)	15.2 (0.60)	3.4 (0.13)	1.0 (0.04)	0.0 (0.0)	0.0 (0.0)	0.4 (0.02)	9.4 (0.37)	22.9 (0.90)	45.9 (1.81)	250.8 (9.88)
Average precipitation days	10	11	7	4	1	0	0	0	0	2	5	8	48
Source: WMO

== Demographics ==
Before the outbreak of the conflict, more than 500 Christian families resided in the city of Daraa.

In 2011, the Melkite Greek Catholic Church had approximately 800-1000 believers.

== Religious buildings ==
- Our Lady of the Annunciation Greek Orthodox Church
- St. John of Damascus Melkite Greek Catholic Church
- Jesus the Light of the World Evangelical National Christian Union Church
- Al-Farooq Omar Mosque (formerly known as the Mosque of the Greatest Prophet)

== See also ==
- Christians in Syria

== Bibliography ==
- Houtsma, M.Th. (1993). E.J. Brill's First Encyclopaedia of Islam. Vol. 1. BRILL. ISBN 9004097961.
- Hütteroth, W.-D.; Abdulfattah, K. (1977). Historical Geography of Palestine, Transjordan and Southern Syria in the Late 16th Century. Erlanger Geographische Arbeiten, Sonderband 5. Erlangen, Germany: Vorstand der Fränkischen Geographischen Gesellschaft. ISBN 3-920405-41-2.
- Le Strange, G. (1890). Palestine Under the Moslems: A Description of Syria and the Holy Land from A.D. 650 to 1500. Committee of the Palestine Exploration Fund.
- Moubayed, S.M. (2006). Steel and Silk. Cune Press. ISBN 9781885942401.
- Robinson, E.; Smith, E. (1841). Biblical Researches in Palestine, Mount Sinai and Arabia Petraea: A Journal of Travels in the year 1838. Vol. 3. Boston: Crocker & Brewster.
- Runciman, Steven (1989). A History of the Crusades, Volume II: The Kingdom of Jerusalem and the Frankish East, 1100-1187. Cambridge University Press. ISBN 978-0-521-06162-9.
- Schumacher, G. (1888). Across the Jordan: being an exploration and survey of part of Hauran and Jaulan. Bentley.
- Sharon, M. (2007). Corpus Inscriptionum Arabicarum Palaestinae, Addendum. Brill. ISBN 978-9004157804.
