= Daraa District =

District of Syria

Daraa District منطقة درعا
- District
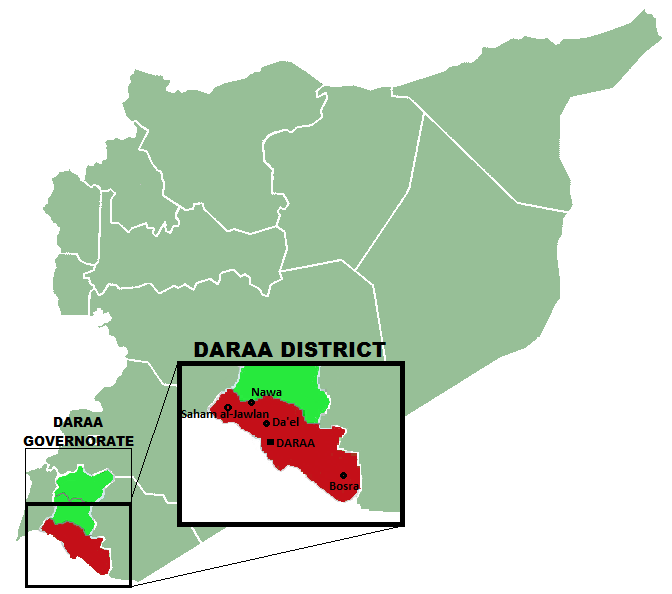
- A map showing the districts of Daraa Governorate, figuring the Daraa District and the most important 5 cities of the district
- Interactive map of Daraa District
- Location of Daraa District in Syria
- Coordinates: 32°40′N 36°10′E
- Country: Syria
- Governorate: Daraa Governorate
- Administrative center: Daraa

Population (2004)
  - Total: 428,681
- Time zone: UTC+2 (EET)
  - Summer (DST): UTC+3 (EEST)

Daraa District (Arabic: منطقة درعا) is a district (mantiqah) administratively belonging to Daraa Governorate, Syria. At the 2004 Census it had a population of 428,681. Its administrative centre is the city of Daraa.

== Sub-districts ==
The district of Daraa is divided into eight sub-districts or Nāḥiyas (population according to 2004 official census):

- Daara Subdistrict (ناحية درعا): population 146,481.
- Bosra Subdistrict (ناحية بصرى): population 33,839.
- Khirbet Ghazaleh Subdistrict (ناحية خربة غزالة): population 44,266.
- Al-Shajara Subdistrict (ناحية الشجرة): population 34,206.
- Da'el Subdistrict (ناحية داعل): population 43,691.
- Muzayrib Subdistrict (ناحية مزيريب): population 72,625.
- Al-Jiza Subdistrict (ناحية الجيزة): population 21,100.
- Al-Musayfirah Subdistrict (ناحية المسيفرة): population 32,473.
